= R482 road (Ireland) =

Road in Ireland

R482 road
- Bóthar R482
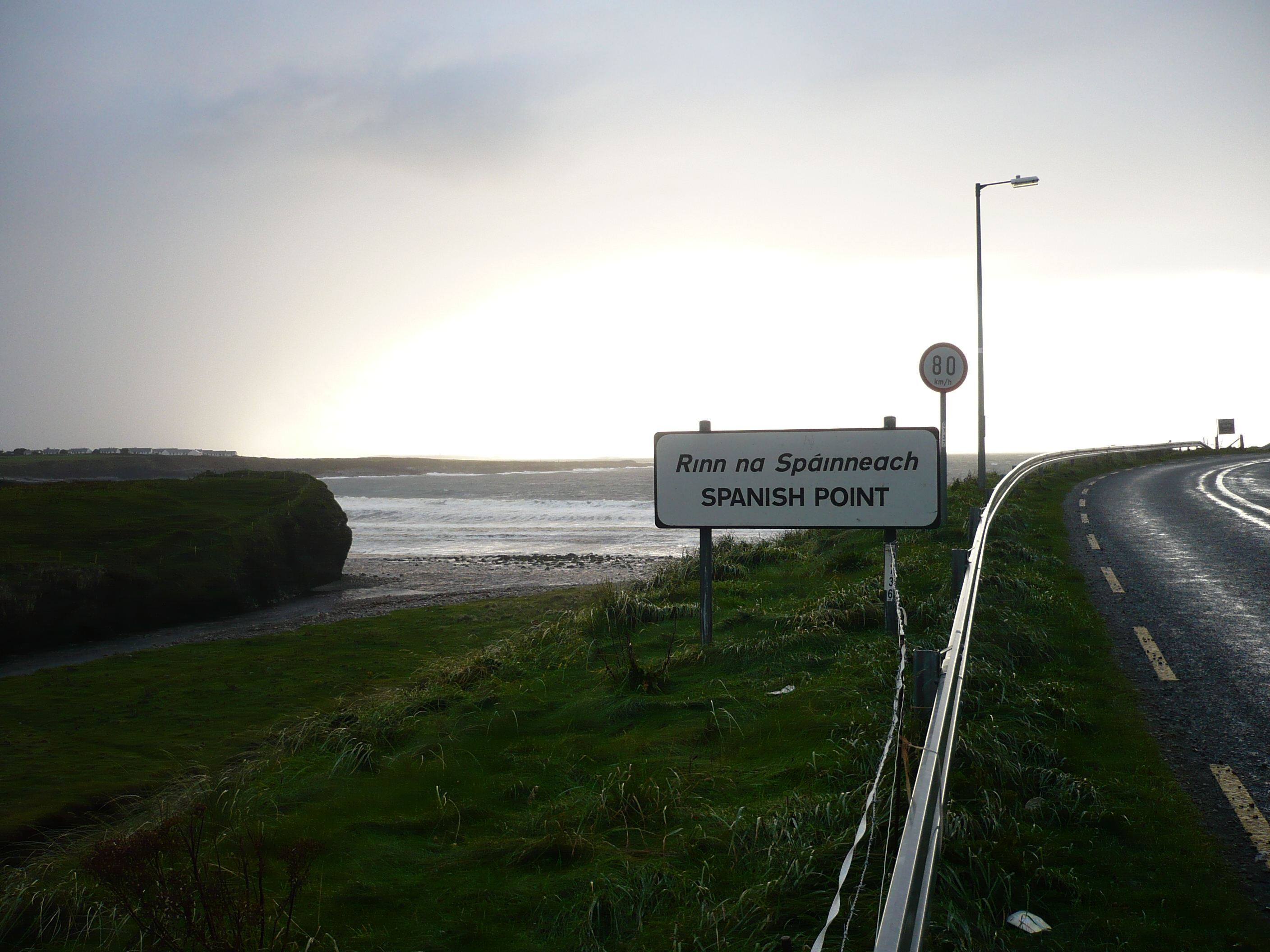
- Spanish Point on the R482

Route information
- Length: 4.4 km (2.7 mi)

Major junctions
- From: N67 at Victoria Cross, County Clare
- To: N67 at Dough

Location
- Country: Ireland

Highway system
- Roads in Ireland; Motorways; Primary; Secondary; Regional
← R481	→ R483

The R482 road is a regional road in Ireland. It is a loop road from the N67 in County Clare. The road is part of the Wild Atlantic Way.

The R482 travels southwest from the N67 to Spanish Point. After Spanish Point, the road turns south before rejoining the N67. The R482 is 4.4 km (2.7 mi) long.
