= R349 road =

R349 road may refer to:

- R349 road (Ireland)
- R349 road (South Africa)
