= R476 road (Ireland) =

Road in Ireland

R476 road
- Bóthar R476
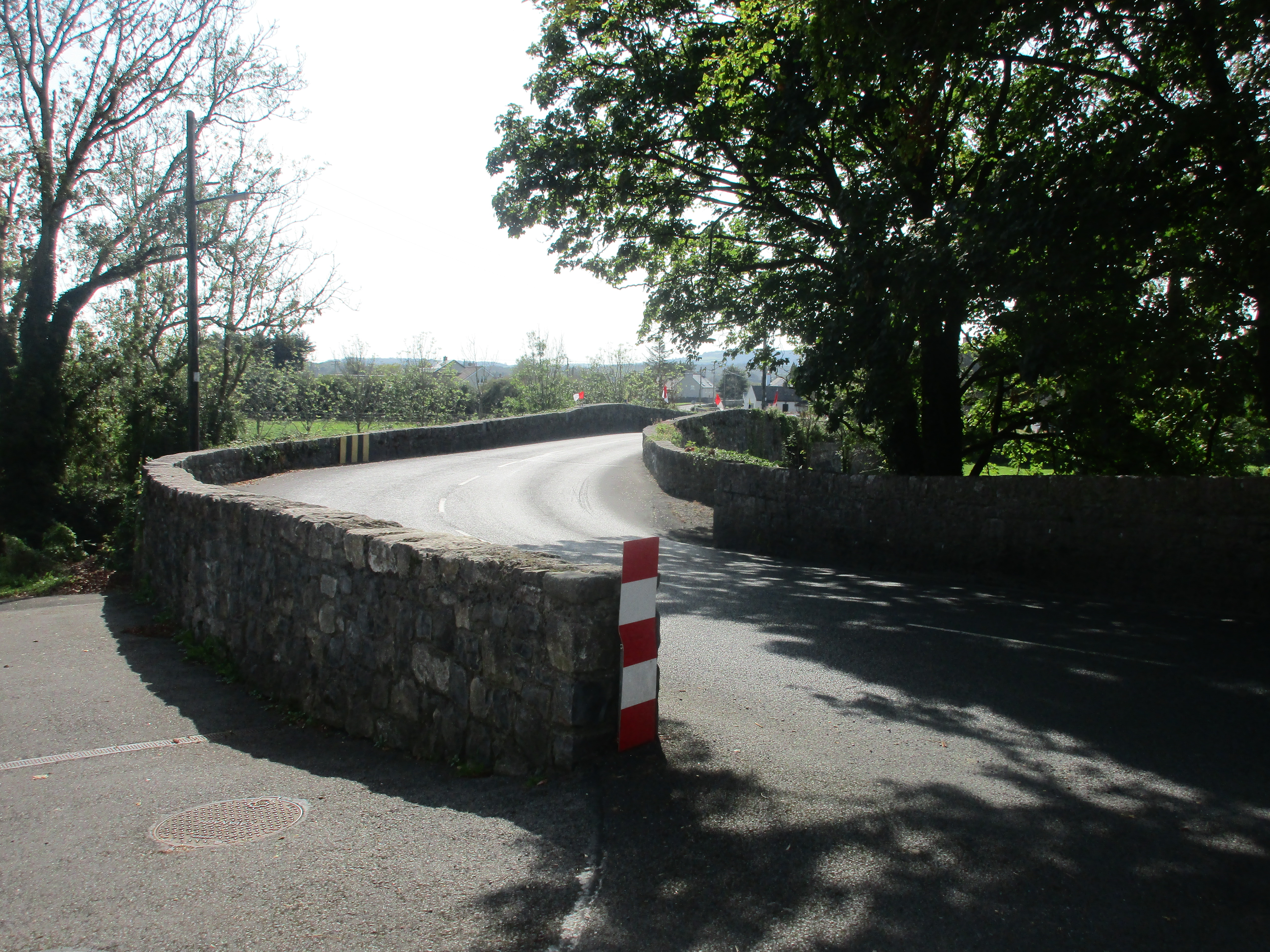
- Corofin Bridge carries the R476 over the River Fergus

Route information
- Length: 31 km (19 mi)

Location
- Country: Ireland
- Primary destinations: County Clare; Ennis (N85 road); Corofin (R460 road); Crosses the River Fergus; Inchiquin; Leamaneh (R480 road); Kilfenora (R481 road); Crosses the Aille River; Lisdoonvarna (R478, N67)

Highway system
- Roads in Ireland; Motorways; Primary; Secondary; Regional

The R476 road is a regional road in central County Clare in Ireland. The route connects the N85 road at Ennis to the N67 road at Lisdoonvarna, 31 kilometres (19 mi) away (map).

The government legislation that defines the R476, the Roads Act 1993 (Classification of Regional Roads) Order 2012 (Statutory Instrument 54 of 2012), provides the following official description:

R476: Ennis - Lisdoonvarna, County Clare

Between its junction with N85 at Fountain Cross and its junction with N67 at Lisdoonvarna via Ballycullinan Bridge, Ballykinnacorra, Corrofin, Killinaboy, Leamaneh Cross, Kilfenora, Ballykeel and Gowlaun Bridge all in the county of Clare.

== See also ==
- Roads in Ireland
- National primary road
- National secondary road
- Regional road
- O'Dea Castle
- Battle of Dysert O'Dea
