= R814 road (Ireland) =

Road in Ireland

R814 road
- Bóthar R814

Route information
- Length: 0.3 km (0.19 mi; 980 ft)

Location
- Country: Ireland
- Primary destinations: Dublin; R813 (City Quay); Lombard Street East; R118 (Pearse Street)

Highway system
- Roads in Ireland; Motorways; Primary; Secondary; Regional

The R814 road, or Lombard Street East, is a regional road in Dublin, Ireland.

The official definition of the R814 from the Roads Act 1993 (Classification of Regional Roads) Order 2006 states:

R814: Lombard Street East, Dublin

Between its junction with R813 at City Quay and its junction with R118 at Pearse Street via Lombard Street East all in the city of Dublin.

The street is 300 metres long.

== See also ==
- Roads in Ireland
- National primary road
- National secondary road
- Regional road
