= R460 road (Ireland) =

Road in Ireland

Coordinates: 53.007407°N 8.949928°W

R460 road
- Bóthar R460
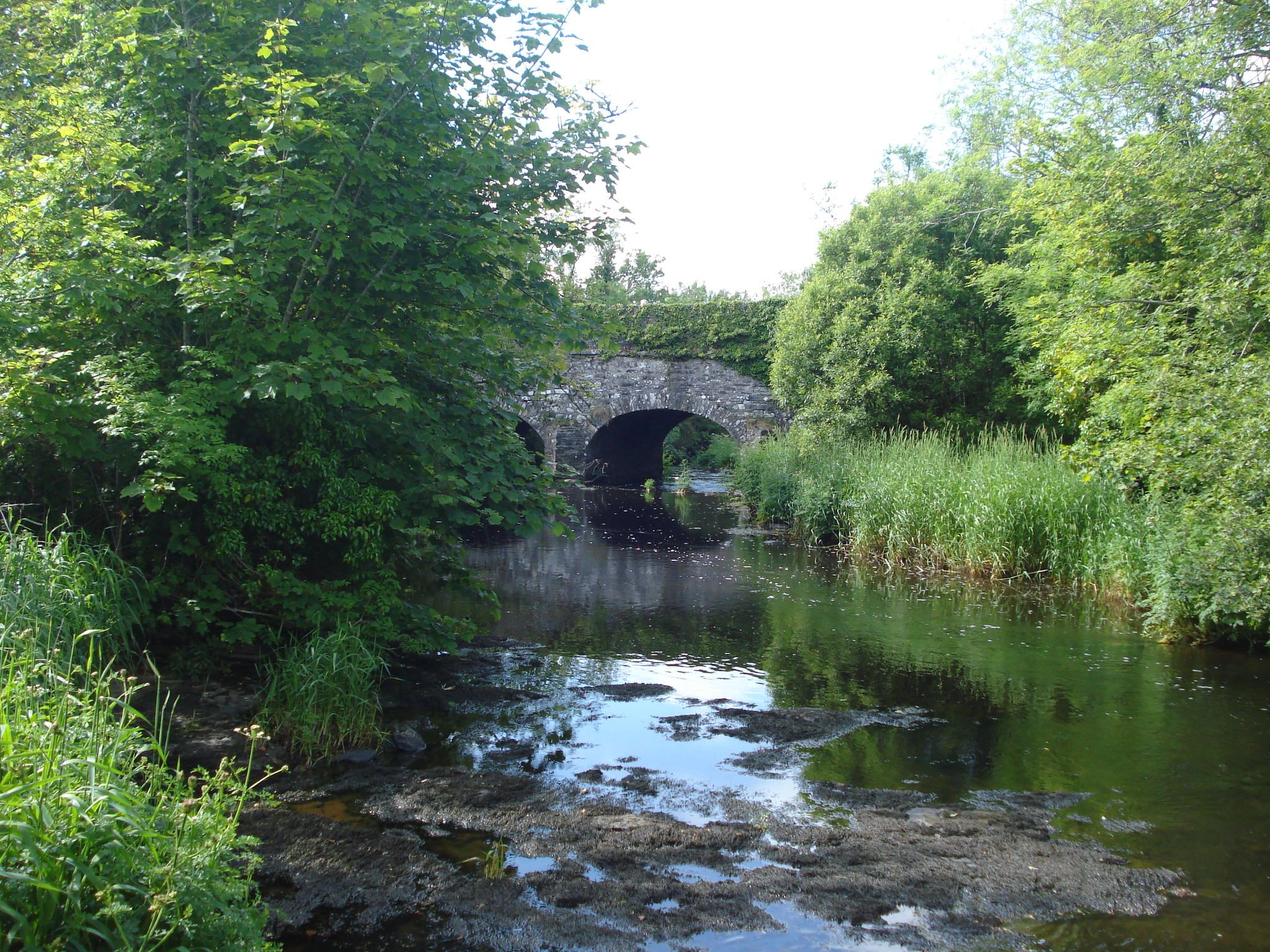
- R460 crossing the Inagh River

Route information
- Length: 49.7 km (30.9 mi)

Major junctions
- From: R474 Knockloskeraun
- N85 Inagh; R476 Corofin, County Clare; Passes Lough Bunny; Enters County Galway; Passes over M18
- To: N66 Gort (Bridge Street)

Location
- Country: Ireland

Highway system
- Roads in Ireland; Motorways; Primary; Secondary; Regional

The R460 road is a regional road in Ireland, located in County Clare and County Galway.
