= R696 road (Ireland) =

Regional road in Ireland

R696 road
- Bóthar R696
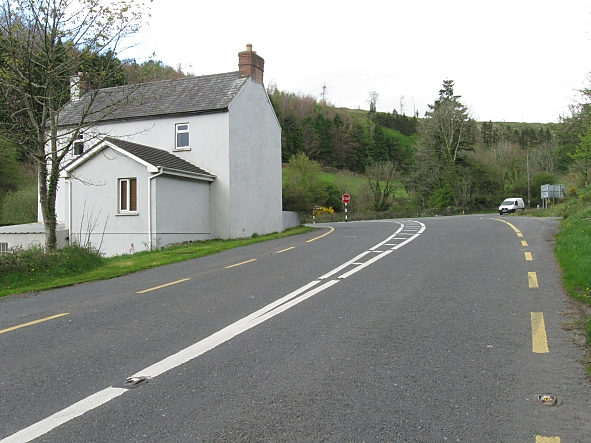
- The R696 near its terminus at the N76 in Glenbower, County Tipperary

Route information
- Length: 8.3 km (5.2 mi)

Major junctions
- From: N24 at John Street, Carrick-on-Suir, County Tipperary
- To: N76 at Glenbower

Location
- Country: Ireland

Highway system
- Roads in Ireland; Motorways; Primary; Secondary; Regional
← R695	→ R697

The R696 road is a regional road in County Tipperary, Ireland. It travels from the N24 road in Carrick-on-Suir to the N76. The R696 is 8.3 kilometres (5.2 mi) long.
