= R598 road (Ireland) =

Road in Ireland

R598 road
- Bóthar R598

Route information
- Length: 7.5 km (4.7 mi)

Location
- Country: Ireland
- Primary destinations: County Cork; leaves the N71 road at Tulligee; Rathbarry; Owenahincha; Terminates at the junction with the N71 road at Owenahincha

Highway system
- Roads in Ireland; Motorways; Primary; Secondary; Regional

The R598 road is a regional road in Ireland which links various villages, including Rathbarry and Owenahincha with the N71 road in County Cork.

The road is 7.5 km (4.7 mi) long.

== See also ==
- Roads in Ireland
- National primary road
- National secondary road
