= Regional road (Ireland) =

Class of road in Ireland

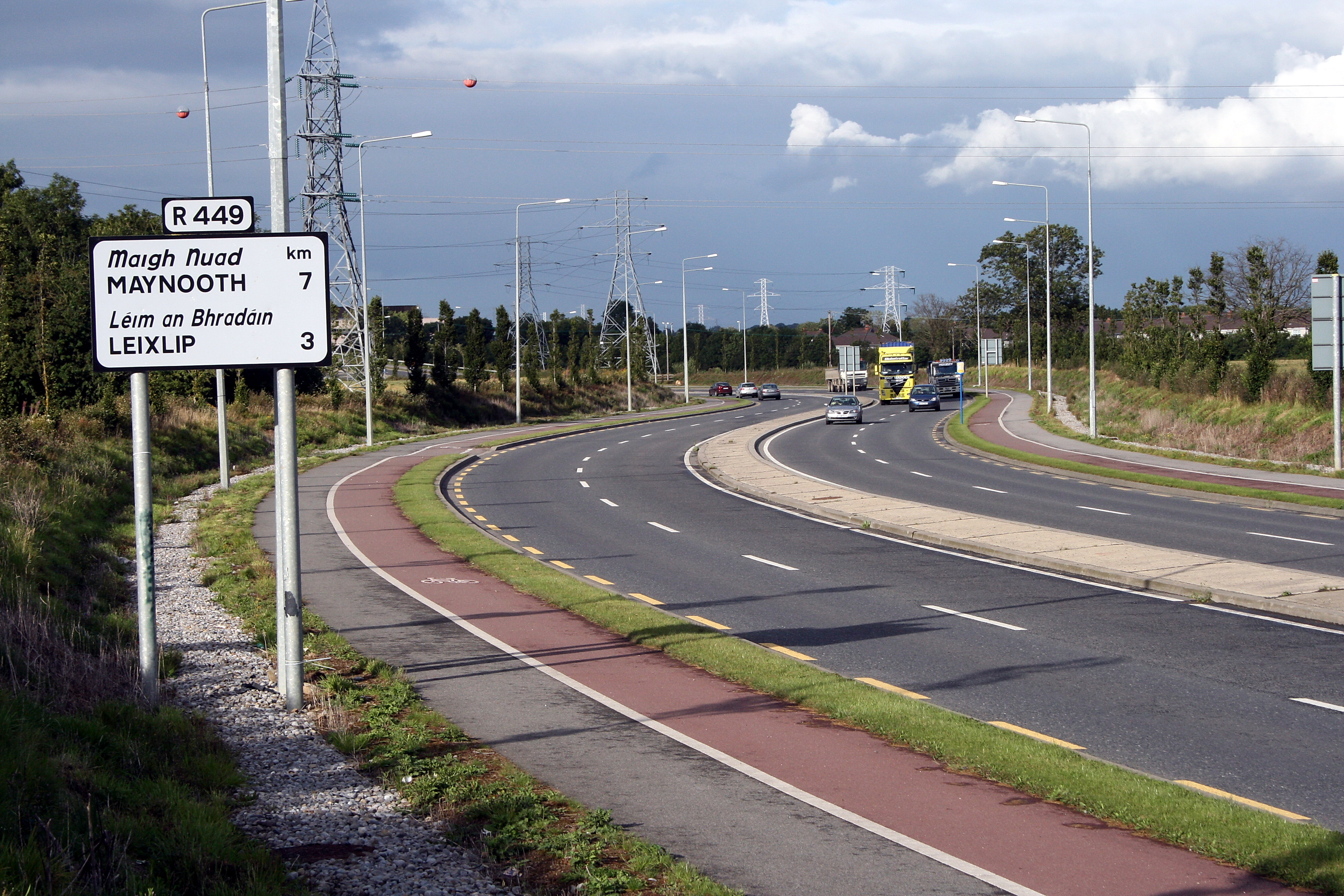
The R449 west of Leixlip

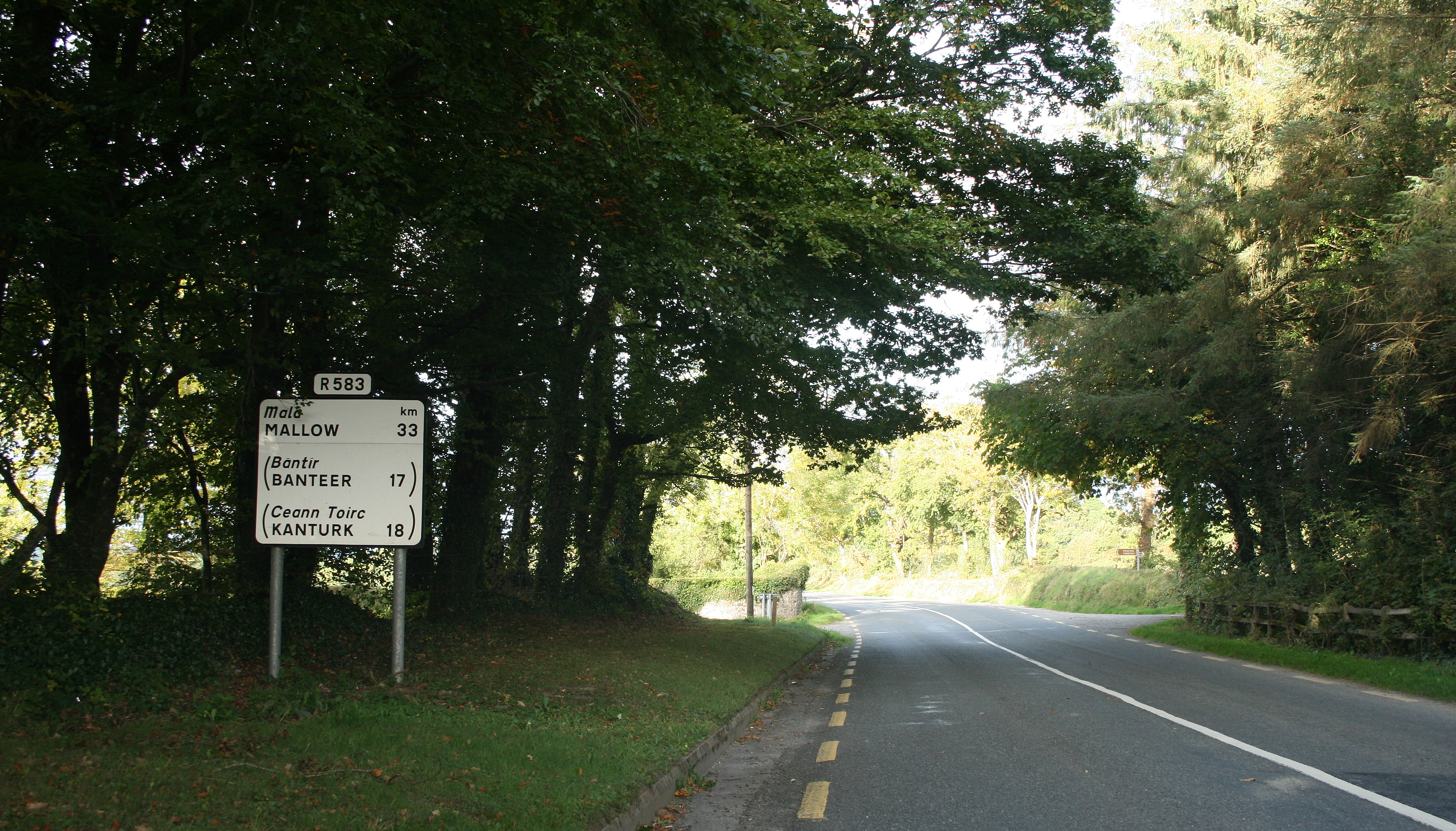
The R583 leaving Millstreet

A regional road (Irish: bóthar réigiúnach) in the Republic of Ireland is a class of road not forming a major route (such as a national primary road or national secondary road), but nevertheless forming a link in the national route network. There are over 11,600 kilometres (7,200 miles) of regional roads. Regional roads are numbered with three-digit route numbers, prefixed by "R" (e.g. R105). The equivalent road category in Northern Ireland are B roads.

== History ==
Until 1977, classified roads in the Republic of Ireland were designated with one of two prefixes: "T" for trunk roads and "L" for link roads. The Local Government (Roads and Motorways) Act, 1974 authorised the designation of roads as national roads: in 1977, twenty-five national primary roads (N1-N25) and thirty-three national secondary roads (N51-N83) were initially designated under the Local Government (Roads and Motorways) Act, 1974 (Declaration of National Roads) Order, 1977.

Many of the remaining classified roads became regional roads, formally authorised under the Roads Act, 1993 (having been indicated as such on road signs on a non-statutory basis for some years previously) and their routes were designated under Roads Act, 1993 (Declaration of Regional Roads) Order, 1994. The latest statutory instrument designating the routes of regional roads was published in 2012.

Other roads once classified as trunk or link roads eventually became local roads.

Older signs showing the former trunk and link road designations are still to be seen in some locations. The L (for link road) prefix on these signs is not connected to the network of local roads currently in place.

== Features ==
Unlike national roads, regional roads are maintained by local county or city councils rather than Transport Infrastructure Ireland. The vast majority of the regional road network is made up of single-carriageway roads although some roads are dual-carriageway. Until the late 1990s, such roads were often in a very poor condition, although increased road maintenance funding to local councils has resulted in more frequent resurfacing of regional roads, as well as relaying and realignment on some routes.

Regional roads are generally subject to a speed limit of 80 km/h (imperial equivalent 50 mph), rather than the 100 km/h (imperial equivalent 62.5 mph) for national roads. Prior to 20 January 2005, when Ireland adopted metric speed limits, national and regional roads had identical speed limits of 60 mph. Regional roads, however, pass through towns, villages and built-up areas frequently, so even lower local speed restrictions are often in place. However, certain regional roads, often sections of former national roads which have been bypassed by motorways or other road improvements, have speed limits of 100 km/h. The R132 (former N1) is an example of a Regional road with a 100 km/h speed limit. (One exception out of a few: R586 road (Ireland)

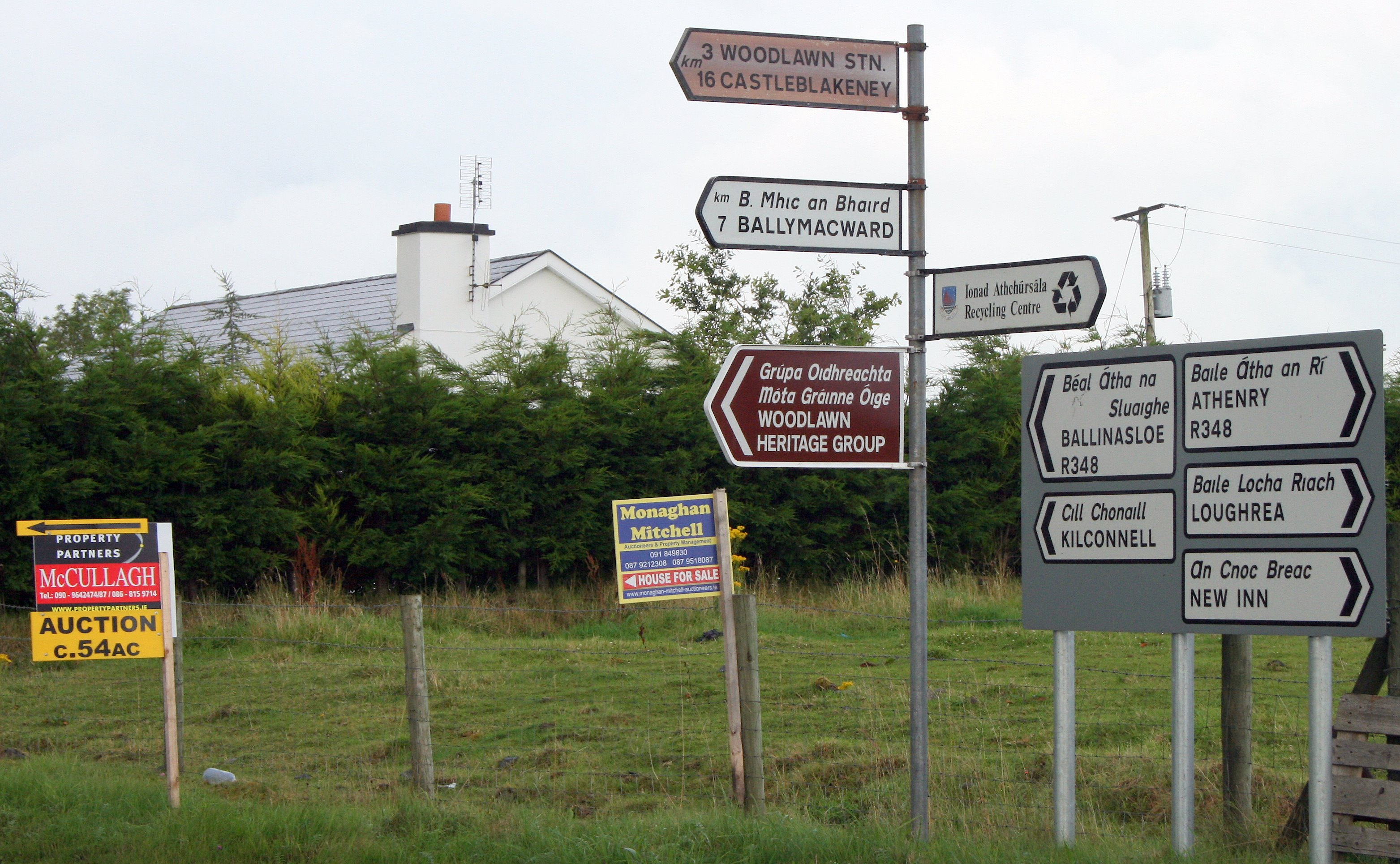
The R348 near Woodlawn, County Galway, with a mixture of fingerpost and improved signposts

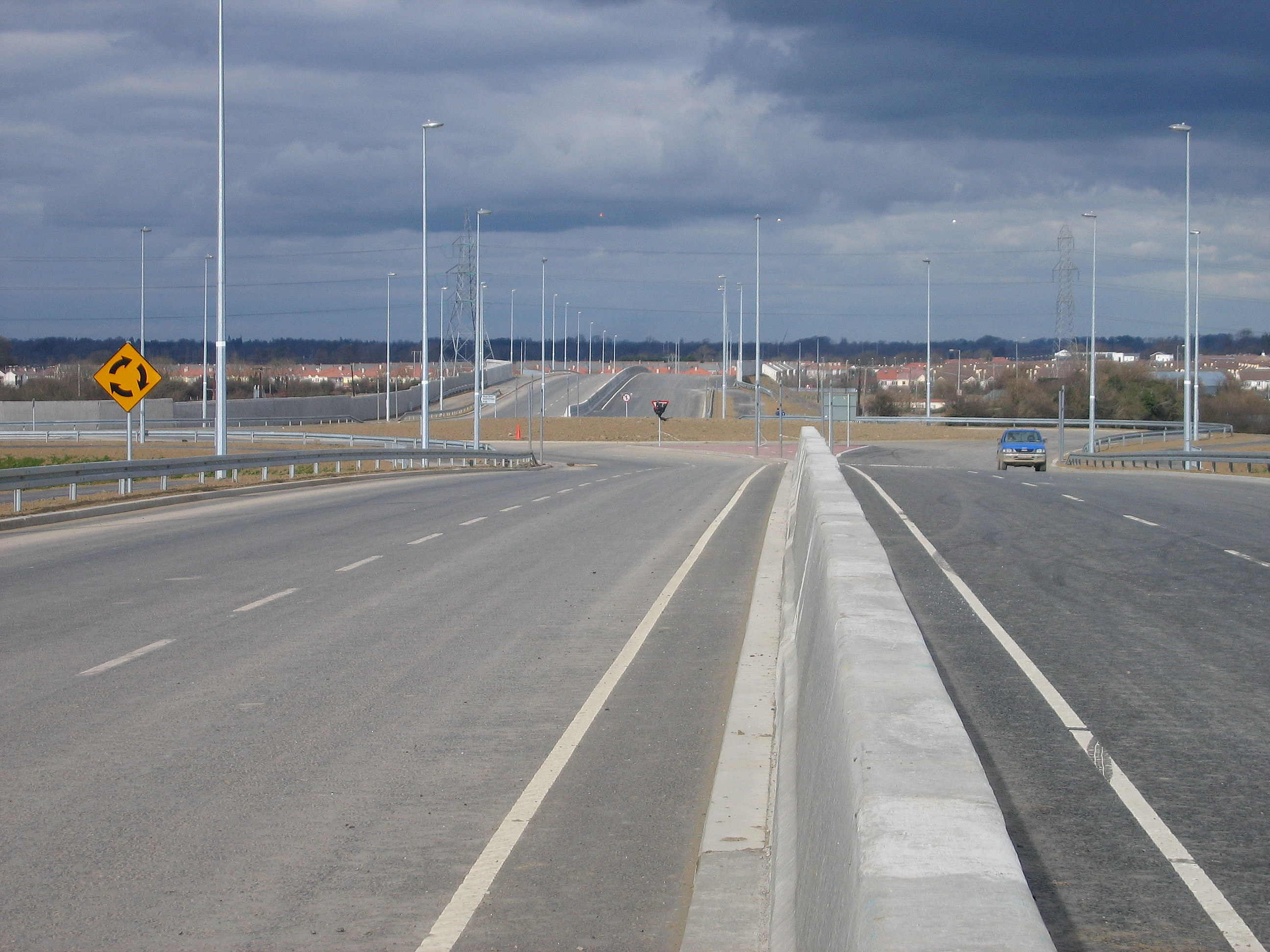
The R136 Outer Ring Road in southwest Dublin

As of 2009, directional signposting on some regional roads in Ireland remains poor, with even modern signage usually relying on fingerpost signposts located directly at junctions. However, work on improving signposting on regional roads has been continuing since 2003; routes which previously had the most deficient signposting were selected for upgrading first. In 2007, a total of "€7 million to continue progress on the regional roads signposting programme, which commenced in 2003" was granted to local authorities.

=== High-capacity regional roads ===
There are some higher-capacity (i.e. not just single-carriageway) sections of regional road, most notably the R113 (Belgard Road) and R445 (Old Naas Road), the R132 Swords Inner By-pass, and R136 Dublin Outer Ring Road which have sections of dual carriageway.

In some cases, important high-capacity urban routes are built or designated as regional roads, such as the mostly dual-carriageway R710 Waterford Outer Ring Road, or the R774 Greystones to the N11 link, which is dual-carriageway for its full length.

In many other cases, upgraded regional roads (for example, wide two-lane roads) were previously part of a national primary road, prior to the construction of a motorway or other bypass. In most cases, when a national primary road is changed by the creation of a bypass (motorway or other), the road previously forming part of the route is reclassified as a regional road rather than as a local road.

== Route definitions ==
The current routes of all regional roads in Ireland – as defined by the Roads Act 1993 (Classification of Regional Roads) Order 2012 – are listed below. The statutory instrument specifies the start and end points of each route and the names of those townlands, villages, towns, and other settlements through which the route passes, as well as individual road names, where necessary, to establish the exact routing.

=== R101–R199 ===
- R101 – North Circular Road, Dublin
- R102 – Blanchardstown – Malahide Road, Dublin
- R103 – Finglas – Killester, Dublin
- R104 – Finglas – Kilbarrack, Dublin
- R105 – Dublin – Howth, County Dublin
- R106 – Sutton – Malahide – Swords, County Dublin
- R107 – Dublin – Malahide, County Dublin
- R108 – Dublin – Naul, County Dublin – Drogheda. County Louth
- R109 – Chapelizod – Wolf Tone Quay, Dublin
- R110 – St Stephen's Green – Red Cow, Dublin
- R111 – Conyngham Road – Beach Road, Sandymount, Dublin
- R112 – Chapelizod – Churchtown – Mount Merrion, County Dublin
- R113 – Fonthill – Blackrock, County Dublin
- R114 – Dublin – Rathfarnham – Brittas, County Dublin
- R115 – Rathfarnham, County Dublin – Laragh, County Wicklow
- R116 – Ballyboden – Loughlinstown, County Dublin
- R117 – Dublin – Enniskerry – Kilcroney, County Wicklow
- R118 – Dublin – Blackrock, County Dublin and Dún Laoghaire – Lahaunstown, County Dublin
- R119 – Blackrock – Dún Laoghaire, County Dublin – Bray, County Wicklow
- R120 – Lucan – Rathcoole – Corbally, County Dublin
- R121 – Lucan – Blanchardstown – Skephubble, County Dublin
- R122 – Finglas – Balbriggan, County Dublin
- R123 – Maynetown – Balgriffin, County Dublin
- R124 – Snugborough – Malahide, County Dublin
- R125 – Swords, County Dublin – Dunshaughlin, County Meath – Kilcock, County Kildare
- R126 – Lissenhall – Portrane, County Dublin
- R127 – Blakes Cross – Skerries – Balbriggan, County Dublin
- R128 – Lusk – Rush – Skerries, County Dublin
- R129 – Coldwinters – Wyanstown, County Dublin
- R130 – Coolquoy Common – Grallagh, County Dublin
- R131 – Drumcondra Road – East Link Bridge – Merrion Gates, Dublin
- R132 – Dublin – Dundalk, County Louth (part of old National Route 1)
- R133 – Drummartin Link Road, Sandyford, County Dublin
- R134 – Nangor Road, Clondalkin, County Dublin
- R135 – Dublin – Ashbourne, County Meath (part of old National Route 2)
- R136 – Lucan – Tallaght, County Dublin (Outer Ring Road)
- R137 – Dame Street – Tallaght, County Dublin (part of old National Route 81)
- R138 – O'Connell Bridge – Mount Merrion Avenue, County Dublin (part of old National Route 11)
- R139 – Clonshaugh – Baldoyle, Dublin (part of old National Route 32)
- R147 – Dublin – Clonee – Kells – Navan – Derver, County Meath (part of old National Route 3)
- R148 – Dublin – Kinnegad, County Westmeath (part of old National Route 4)
- R149 – Leixlip, County Kildare – Clonee, County Meath
- R150 – Drogheda, County Louth – Bettystown – Julianstown – Kentstown, County Meath
- R151 – Bettystown – Mornington, County Meath
- R152 – Drogheda, County Louth – Cushinstown, County Meath
- R153 – Navan – Balrath, County Meath
- R154 – Black Bull – Trim – Athboy, County Meath – Crossdoney, County Cavan
- R155 – Piercetown – Primatestown, County Meath
- R156 – Dunboyne – Summerhill, County Meath – The Downs, County Westmeath
- R157 – Dunboyne, County Meath – Maynooth, County Kildare
- R158 – Trim – Summerhill, County Meath – Kilcock, County Kildare
- R159 – Innfield – Laracor, County Meath
- R160 – Ballynadrumny, County Kildare – Trim, County Meath
- R161 – Navan, County Meath – Kinnegad, County Westmeath
- R162 – Navan, County Meath – Kingscourt, County Cavan – Monaghan
- R163 – Ballinlough Big – Kells – Slane, County Meath
- R164 – Ballyboy – Kells – Moynalty, County Meath – Kingscourt, County Cavan
- R165 – Blakestown, County Louth – Kingscourt – Knockanoark – Rakenny, County Cavan
- R166 – Mell, Louth – Drogheda – Clogherhead – Castlebellingham – Tallanstown, County Louth
- R167 – Drogheda – Termonfeckin, County Louth
- R168 – Drogheda – Collon, County Louth
- R169 – Dunleer – Collon, County Louth
- R170 – Ardee – Dunleer – Murrays Cross, County Louth
- R171 – Ardee – Louth – Dundalk, County Louth
- R172 – Green Gates – Blackrock – Dundalk, County Louth
- R173 – Dundalk – Carlingford – County Bridge, County Louth
- R174 – Feede – Rockmarshall, County Louth
- R175 – The Bush – Greenore, County Louth
- R176 – Carlingford – Saint James Well, County Louth
- R177 – Dundalk – Drumbilla, County Louth
- R178 – Dundalk, County Louth – Carrickmacross, County Monaghan – Bailieborough – Virginia, County Cavan
- R179 – Kingscourt, County Cavan – Carrickmacross – Corcullioncrew, County Monaghan
- R180 – Carrickmacross – Ballybay, County Monaghan
- R181 – Shercock, County Cavan – Castleblayney – Tullynagrow, County Monaghan
- R182 – Castleblayney – Lurganearly, County Monaghan
- R183 – Castleblayney – Ballybay – Clones, County Monaghan
- R184 – Clontibret – Ballybay, County Monaghan
- R185 – Cavanreagh – Glasslough – Kiltybeggs, County Monaghan
- R186 – Monaghan – Drumfurrer, County Monaghan
- R187 – Annaghervy – Inishammon, County Monaghan
- R188 – Monaghan – Cootehill, County Cavan – Cavan
- R189 – Monaghan – Newbliss – Dyan, County Monaghan
- R190 – Ballybay, County Monaghan – Cootehill, County Cavan
- R191 – Mullagh – Bailieborough – Cootehill, County Cavan
- R192 – Shercock – Cootehill, County Cavan
- R193 – Rockcorry – Anny, County Monaghan
- R194 – Moynalty, County Meath – Virginia, County Cavan – Longford
- R195 – Virginia, County Cavan – Castlepollard, County Westmeath
- R196 – New Inn – Ballyjamesduff, County Cavan
- R197 – Belturbet – Corrarod, County Cavan
- R198 – Cavan – Arvagh, County Cavan – Longford
- R199 – Crossdoney, County Cavan – Ballinamore, County Leitrim

=== R200–R299 ===
- R200 – Derrynacreeve, County Cavan – Drumkeeran, County Leitrim
- R201 – Belturbet – Killeshandra, County Cavan – Drumsna, County Leitrim
- R202 – Dromod, County Leitrim – Derrynacreeve, County Cavan
- R203 – Arvagh, County Cavan – Carrigallen, County Leitrim
- R204 – Carigallen – Ballinamore, County Leitrim
- R205 – Garadice, County Leitrim – Gortawee, County Cavan
- R206 – Glangevlin – Blacklion, County Cavan
- R207 – Drumshanbo, County Leitrim – Dowra, Mullaghahy, County Cavan
- R208 – Drumshanbo – Ballinamore, County Leitrim
- R209 – Drumheckil – Fenagh, County Leitrim
- R210 – Drumaleague – Drumcong, County Leitrim
- R211 – Cappoge – Mooremount, County Louth
- R212 – Clones, County Monaghan – Ballyhaise, County Cavan – Cavan
- R213 – Tyholland – Castleshane, County Monaghan
- R214 – Castleshane – Drumbeo, County Monaghan
- R229 – De Valera Road and Port Road, Letterkenny, County Donegal
- R230 – Glencolmbkille – Ardara. County Donegal
- R231 – Ballyshannon – Ballintra, County Donegal
- R232 – Eaghy – Pettigoe, County Donegal
- R233 – Pettigoe – Lough Derg, County Donegal
- R234 – Pettigoe – Letter Bridge, County Donegal
- R235 – Castlefinn – Alt Upper, County Donegal
- R236 – Stranorlar – Dunmore, County Donegal
- R237 – Newtowncunningham – Athaghaderry, County Donegal
- R238 – Ring of Inishowen, County Donegal
- R239 – Muff – Burnfoot – Carrownamaddy, County Donegal
- R240 – Quigleys Point – Carndonagh, County Donegal
- R241 – Moville – Portsallagh, County Donegal
- R242 – Doon Bridge – Malin – Slievebane, County Donegal
- R243 – Malin – Templemoyle Cross, County Donegal
- R244 – Drumfree – Gleneely, County Donegal
- R245 – Letterkenny – Rathmelton – Creeslough, County Donegal
- R246 – Kilmacrennan – Millford – Portsalon, County Donegal
- R247 – Rathmelton – Carrowkeel – Cionn Fhanáda, County Donegal
- R248 – Carrigart – Na Dúnaibh, County Donegal
- R249 – Kilmacrenan – Rathmelton, County Donegal
- R250 – Letterkenny – Glenties, County Donegal
- R251 – Doon Glebe – Gaoth Dobhair, County Donegal
- R252 – Ballybofey – An Clochán Liath, County Donegal
- R253 – Ballybofey – Glenties, County Donegal
- R254 – Carrickyscanlan – An Dúchoraidh, County Donegal
- R255 – An Tearmann – Drumfin, County Donegal
- R256 – Glenveagh – An Fál Carrach, County Donegal
- R257 – Gort an Choirce – Doirí Beaga – Croithlí, County Donegal
- R258 – Acomhal Ghaoth Dobhair – Cé an Bhuna Bhig, County Donegal
- R259 – Croithlí – Ailt an Choráin – An Clochán Liath, County Donegal
- R260 – Ailt an Choráin – Cé Ailt an Choráin, County Donegal
- R261 – Maas – Ardara, County Donegal
- R262 – Glenties – Mountcharles, County Donegal
- R263 – Aghayeevoge – Killybegs – Málainn Bhig, County Donegal
- R264 – Raphoe – Lifford, County Donegal
- R265 – Rossgeir – St Johnstown – Newtowncunningham, County Donegal
- R266 – Mín Doire Abhainn – Aerfort na Carraige Finne, County Donegal
- R267 – The Diamond, Donegal and Ballyshannon – Bundoran, County Donegal (part of old National Route 15)
- R268 – Portsalon Coast Road, County Donegal
- R277 – Sligo Airport Road, Strandhill, County Donegal
- R278 – Sligo – Cornalaghta, County Leitrim
- R279 – Cliffoney – Mullaghmore, County Sligo
- R280 – Bundoran, County Donegal Manorhamilton – Carrick-on-Shannon, County Leitrim
- R281 – Kinlough – Conray – Glenfarne, County Leitrim
- R282 – Manorhamilton – Dooard, County Leitrim
- R283 – Manorhamilton – Kiltyclogher, County Leitrim
- R284 – Carrowroe, County Sligo – Leitrim
- R285 – Ardcarn – Keadew – Mountallen, County Roscommon
- R286 – Sligo – Pollboy, County Leitrim
- R287 – Sligo – Killarga, County Leitrim
- R288 – Dromahair – Sriff, County Leitrim
- R289 – Dromahair – Corderry, County Leitrim
- R290 – Gortlownan – Ballisadare, County Sligo
- R291 – Sligo – Rosses Point, County Sligo
- R292 – Sligo – Strandhill – Ballisadare, County Sligo
- R293 – Ballynaboll, County Sligo – Ballaghaderreen, County Roscommon – Ballyhaunis, County Mayo
- R294 – Boyle, County Roscommon – Tobercurry, County Sligo – Ballina, County Mayo
- R295 – Ballymote, County Sligo – Boyle, County Roscommon
- R296 – Ballymote – Quarryfield, County Sligo
- R297 – Dromore West, County Sligo – Dooyeaghvy, County Mayo
- R298 – Inishcrone – Carrownurlar, County Sligo
- R299 – Drumsna – Drumheckil, County Leitrim

=== R300–R399 ===
- R300 – Partry, County Mayo – An Fhairche, County Galway
- R310 – Castlebar – Rahans, County Mayo
- R311 – Castlebar – Newport, County Mayo
- R312 – Castlebar – Bellacorick, County Mayo
- R313 – Bangor – An Fod Dubh, County Mayo
- R314 – Béal an Mhuirthead – Ballycastle – Ballina, County Mayo
- R315 – Pontoon – Crossmolina – Ballycastle, County Mayo
- R316 – Bogadoon – Crossmolina, County Mayo
- R317 – Newport – Boggy, County Mayo
- R318 – Foxford – Pontoon, County Mayo
- R319 – Mallaranny – Keem, County Mayo
- R320 – Swinford – Claremorris, County Mayo
- R321 – Ballylahan – Bohola – Kiltimagh, County Mayo
- R322 – Kiltimagh – Kilkelly, County Mayo
- R323 – Kiltimagh – Knock – Ballyhaunis, County Mayo
- R324 – Balla – Kiltimagh, County Mayo
- R325 – Glentavraun, County Mayo – Cloonarragh, County Roscommon
- R326 – Loughglinn – Meelick, County Roscommon
- R327 – Cuilmore, County Mayo – Pollremon, County Galway
- R328 – Ballindine, County Mayo – Moylough, County Galway
- R329 – Knock, County Mayo (part of old National Route 17)
- R330 – Westport – Partry, County Mayo
- R331 – Claremorris – Ballinrobe, County Mayo
- R332 – Moylough – Tuam, County Galway – Kilmaine, County Mayo
- R333 – Tuam – Headford, County Galway
- R334 – Ballinrobe – Neale, County Mayo – Headford, County Galway
- R335 – Westport – Louisburgh – Leenane, County Mayo
- R336 – Leenaun – An Teach Dóite – An Spidéal, County Galway – Galway
- R337 – Taylors Hill, Galway
- R338 – Salthill – Newcastle – Oranmore, County Galway
- R339 – Galway – Caltra, County Galway
- R340 – Scrib – Sraith Salach, County Galway
- R341 – Ballinafad – Roundstone – Clifden, County Galway
- R342 – Lettershinna – Doire Fhada Thiar, County Galway
- R343 – Casla – An Cheathrú Rua, County Galway
- R344 – Sraith Salach – Kylemore, County Galway
- R345 – An Mám, County Galway – Neale, County Mayo
- R346 – Cong – Cross, County Mayo
- R347 – Kinvarra – Craughwell – Tuam, County Galway
- R348 – Derrydonnell – Athenry – Ballinasloe, County Galway
- R349 – Loughrea – Tallyho Cross, County Galway
- R350 – Loughrea – Bellafa, County Galway
- R351 – Loughrea – Woodford, County Galway
- R352 – Portumna, County Galway – Ennis, County Clare
- R353 – Portumna – Ballinasloe, County Galway
- R355 – Portumna – Ballinasloe, County Galway
- R356 – Killimor, County Galway – Cloghan, County Offaly
- R357 – Athleague, County Roscommon – Ballinasloe, County Galway – Blue Ball, County Offaly
- R358 – Ballinasloe – Mount Bellew Bridge, County Galway
- R359 – Mount Bellew Bridge – New Inn, County Galway
- R360 – Dunmore – Ballymoe, County Galway
- R361 – Williamstown, County Galway – Castlerea, County Roscommon – Boyle, County Roscommon
- R362 – Dunmore, County Galway – Athleague, County Roscommon – Athlone, County Westmeath
- R363 – Newsbridge, County Galway – Bellanamullia, County Roscommon
- R364 – Moylough – Ballymoe, County Galway
- R365 – Marlay – Ballynahowna, County Galway
- R366 – Roscommon – Aghagower, County Roscommon
- R367 – Ballymoe, County Galway – Tulsk, County Roscommon
- R368 – Four Mile House – Strokestown, County Roscommon – Carrick-on-Shannon, County Leitrim
- R369 – Elphin – Gortnagoyne, County Roscommon
- R370 – Frenchpark, County Roscommon – Carrick-on-Shannon, County Leitrim
- R371 – Roosky, County Leitrim – Ballyleague, County Roscommon
- R372 – Na Doiriú Theas – Cé Nua Ros an Mhíl, County Galway
- R373 – Breaffy – Castlebar, County Mayo
- R374 – Casla – Leitir Mealláin, County Galway
- R375 – Swinford – Kilkelly, County Mayo
- R376 – Lurga Upper – Ireland West Airport
- R377 – Castleplunket – Castlerea, County Roscommon
- R378 – Louisburgh – Roonagh Pier, County Mayo
- R379 – Streamstown – Cleggan, County Galway
- R389 – Kilbeggan – Skeagh, County Westmeath
- R390 – Mullingar – Ballymore – Athlone, County Westmeath
- R391 – Mullingar – Horseleap, County Westmeath – Clara, County Offaly
- R392 – Mullingar, County Westmeath – Ballymahon – Lanesborough, County Longford
- R393 – Mullingar – Ballinacarrigy, County Westmeath – Longford
- R394 – Tullanisky, County Westmeath – Kilcogy, County Cavan
- R395 – Delvin – Castlepollard, County Westmeath – Edgeworthstown, County Longford
- R396 – Coole, County Westmeath – Granard, County Longford
- R397 – Longford – Ballymahon, County Longford
- R398 – Derraghan More – Brickeens, County Longford
- R399 – Kilcurry – Ratharney, County Longford

=== R400–R499 ===
- R400 – Mullingar, County Westmeath – Cushina, County Offaly
- R401 – Kinnegad, County Westmeath – Edenderry, County Offaly – Kildare
- R402 – Innfield, County Meath – Ballina Cross, County Offaly
- R403 – Lucan, County Dublin – Clane – Carbury, County Kildare
- R404 – Leixlip – Saint Wolstans, County Kildare
- R405 – Maynooth, County Kildare – Newcastle, County Dublin
- R406 – Maynooth – Barberstown Cross, County Kildare
- R407 – Kilcock – Naas, County Kildare
- R408 – Maynooth – Prosperous, County Kildare
- R409 – Blackwood Cross – Naas, County Kildare
- R410 – Naas, County Kildare – Blessington, County Wicklow
- R411 – Naas, County Kildare – Hollywood, County Wicklow
- R412 – Stephenstown South, County Kildare – Whitestown, County Wicklow
- R413 – Kildare – Kilcullen – Ballymore Eustace, County Kildare
- R414 – Shee Bridge – Monasterevin, County Kildare
- R415 – Allenwood Cross – Kildare – Crookstown Upper, County Kildare
- R416 – Milltown – Droichead Nua – Kinnegad Cross, County Kildare
- R417 – Monasterevin, County Kildare – Carlow
- R418 – Athy – Castledermot, County Kildare – Tullow, County Carlow
- R419 – Greatheath – Portarlington, County Laois – Bracknagh, County Offaly – Rathangan, County Kildare
- R420 – Killinure, County Laois – Bawnoges, County Westmeath
- R421 – Tullamore, County Offaly – Roscrea, County Tipperary
- R422 – Cappakeel – New Inn – Mountmellick – Coolagh Cross, County Laois
- R423 – Portarlington, County Offaly – Mountmellick – Mountrath, County Laois
- R424 – Lea Cross, County Laois – Monasterevin, County Kildare
- R425 – Rathbrennan – Abbeyleix, County Laois
- R426 – Portlaoise – Castlecomer, County Kilkenny
- R427 – Cashel – Stradbally, County Laois – Cloney, County Kildare
- R428 – Stradbally, County Laois – Athy, County Kildare
- R429 – Ballickmoyler, County Laois – Maganey Cross, County Kildare
- R430 – Carlow – Mountrath, County Laois
- R431 – Crettyard – Molloys Cross, County Laois
- R432 – Abbeyleix, County Laois – Ballyragget, County Kilkenny
- R433 – Abbeyleix, County Laois – Templemore, County Tipperary
- R434 – Borris-in-Ossory – Durrow, County Laois
- R435 – Borris-in-Ossory – Rathdowney, County Laois – Balief Cross, County Kilkenny
- R436 – Kilbeggan, County Westmeath – Ferbane, County Offaly
- R437 – Ferbane – Kilcormac, County Offaly
- R438 – Borrisokane, County Tipperary – Cloghan, County Offaly
- R439 – Birr – Banagher, County Offaly
- R440 – Birr – Kinnity, County Offaly – Mountrath, County Laois
- R441 – Rhode – Edenderry, County Offaly
- R442 – Clonbullogue – Bracknagh, County Offaly
- R443 – Ring Road, Tullamore, County Offaly
- R444 – Shannonbridge – Clonmacnoise, County Offaly – Farnagh, County Westmeath
- R445 – Naas, County Kildare – Portlaoise, County Laois – Roscrea – Nenagh, County Tipperary – Limerick – Crathloemoyle, County Clare (part of old National Routes 7 and 18)
- R446 – Kinnegad, County Westmeath – Galway (old National Route 6)
- R448 – Naas, County Kildare – Waterford (old National Route 9)
- R449 – Collinstown – Celbridge, County Kildare
- R458 – Gort, County Galway – Smithstown, County Clare (part of old National Route 18)
- R459 – Doolin – Doolin Pier, County Clare
- R460 – Gort, County Galway – Corofin – Milltown Malbay, County Clare
- R461 – Gort, County Galway – Scarriff, County Clare
- R462 – Gort, County Galway – Cratloe, County Clare
- R463 – Limerick – Killaloe – Scarriff, County Clare
- R464 – Limerick – Parteen, County Clare
- R465 – Parkroe – Bodyke, County Clare
- R466 – Cloughan – Broadford, County Clare – Birdhill, County Tipperary
- R467 – Clogher – Rosneillan, County Clare
- R468 – Ballynahinch – Feakle, County Clare
- R469 – Kilmurry – Ennis, County Clare
- R470 – Newmarket-on-Fergus – Sixmilebridge, County Clare
- R471 – Shannon Town – Cloonlara, County Clare
- R472 – Newmarket-on-Fergus – Shannon, County Clare
- R473 – Ennis – Killadysert – Kilrush Pier, County Clare
- R474 – Ennis – Milltown Malbay, County Clare
- R475 – College Green, Ennis, County Clare
- R476 – Ennis – Lisdoonvarna, County Clare
- R477 – Ballyvaughan – Black Head – Lisdoonvarna, County Clare
- R478 – Lisdoonvarna – Cliffs of Moher – Lehinch, County Clare
- R479 – Ballynalackan – Coogyulla, County Clare
- R480 – Ballyvaughan – Leamaneh Cross, County Clare
- R481 – Kilfenora – Ennistimon, County Clare
- R482 – Spanish Point Road, County Clare
- R483 – Cloonadrum – Kilrush, County Clare
- R484 – Doonbegh – Creegh – Knockalough, County Clare
- R485 – Derrycrossaun Cross – Corrowniska, County Clare
- R486 – Carrowbane – Killimer Ferry, County Clare
- R487 – Kilkee – Loop Head, County Clare
- R488 – Breaghva – Carrigaholt, County Clare
- R489 – Portumna, County Galway – Birr, County Offaly
- R490 – Borrisokane, County Tipperary – Moneygall, County Offaly
- R491 – Nenagh – Cloughjordan, County Tipperary – Shinrone, County Offaly – Roscrea, County Tipperary
- R492 – Sharavogue – Shinrone, County Offaly
- R493 – Nenagh – Coolbaun – Carrigahorrig, County Tipperary
- R494 – Nenagh – Ballina – Birdhill, County Tipperary
- R495 – Nenagh – Dromineer, County Tipperary
- R496 – Kilmastulla, County Tipperary – Killaloe, County Clare
- R497 – Nenagh – Dolla – Tipperary, County Tipperary
- R498 – Nenagh – Thurles, County Tipperary
- R499 – Toomyvara – Dolla – Boher, County Tipperary

=== R500–R599 ===
- R500 – Nenagh – Silvermines, County Tipperary
- R501 – Templemore – Borrisoleigh, County Tipperary
- R502 – Templemore, County Tipperary – Johnstown, County Kilkenny
- R503 – Limerick – Milestone – Thurles, County Tipperary
- R504 – Birdhill – Newport, County Tipperary
- R505 – Grange East, County Limerick – Dundrum – Cashel, County Tipperary
- R506 – Annacotty – Cappamore, County Limerick
- R507 – Cluggin Cross – Doon, County Limerick
- R508 – Limerick – Clonmacken; much of route became part of the N7 in 1994. Now R445 and L8570.
- R509 – Childers Road, Limerick
- R510 – Dock Road – Ballycummin, Limerick
- R511 – Limerick – Crean, County Limerick
- R512 – Limerick – Kilmallock, County Limerick – Fermoy, County Cork
- R513 – Bearys Cross, County Limerick – Mitchelstown, County Cork
- R514 – Rockstown – Herbertstown, County Limerick
- R515 – Tipperary – Charleville, County Cork – Abbeyfeale, County Limerick
- R516 – Emly, County Tipperary – Bruff – Croom, County Limerick
- R517 – Kilmallock, County Limerick – Mitchelstown, County Cork
- R518 – Kilmallock – Rathkeale – Askeaton, County Limerick (part of old National Route 69)
- R519 – Adare – Drumcolliher, County Limerick
- R520 – Ballynaskig – Ballykevan – Newcastle West, County Limerick
- R521 – Newcastle West – Foynes, County Limerick
- R522 – Newcastle West, County Limerick – Kildorrery, County Cork
- R523 – Rathkeale, County Limerick – Listowel, County Kerry (part of old National Route 21)
- R524 – Glin – Athea – Abbeyfeale, County Limerick
- R525 – Dalys Cross – Montpelier, County Limerick
- R526 – Patrickswell, County Limerick – Limerick (part of old National Route 20)
- R527 – Caherdavin – Ballysimon Road, Limerick (part of old National Routes 18 and 24)
- R548 – Doirín Dún Aodha – Guagán Barra, County Cork
- R549 – An Mhuiríoch – Feothanach – Dingle, County Kerry
- R550 – Crosaire na Coille Móire – Srón Bhroin, County Kerry
- R551 – Tarbert – Ballybunion – Tralee, County Kerry
- R552 – Ballylongford – Listowel, County Kerry
- R553 – Listowel – Ballybunion, County Kerry
- R554 – Ballyconry – Lisselton, County Kerry
- R555 – Listowel, County Kerry – Abbeyfeale, County Limerick
- R556 – Ballyduff – Tralee, County Kerry
- R557 – Abbeydorney – Listowel, County Kerry
- R558 – Tralee – Fenit, County Kerry
- R559 – Dingle – Ceann Sléibhe – Baile an Fheirtéaraigh, County Kerry
- R560 – Camp – An Conair, Dingle, County Kerry
- R561 – Farranfore – Castlemaine – Anascaul, County Kerry
- R562 – Killorglin – Killarney; upgraded to a western extension of the N72.
- R563 – Milltown – Fossa, County Kerry
- R564 – Glenbeigh – Rossbeigh, County Kerry
- R565 – Caherciveen – Portmagee – Knightstown, County Kerry
- R566 – Kilcoman – Baile an Sceilg – Portmagee, County Kerry
- R567 – Kineigh Cross – Emlaghmore, County Kerry
- R568 – Sneem – Molls Gap, County Kerry
- R569 – Kenmare – Poulgorm, County Kerry
- R570 – Glenflesk – Barraduff, County Kerry
- R571 – Kenmare, County Kerry – Castletownbere, County Cork
- R572 – Glengarriff – Dursey Sound, County Cork
- R573 – Tuosist – Lauragh, County Kerry
- R574 – Derreen, County Kerry – Healy Pass – Adrigole, County Cork
- R575 – Barnes Gap – Eyeries, County Cork
- R576 – Wellesley Bridge, County Kerry – Kippagh Junction, County Cork
- R577 – Castleisland, County Kerry – Clonbannin, County Cork
- R578 – Ballydesmond – Newmarket – Charleville, County Cork
- R579 – Broadford, County Limerick – Kanturk, County Cork – Cork
- R580 – Kanturk – Buttevant, County Cork
- R581 – Twopothouse – Doneraile, County Cork
- R582 – Ballydesmond, County Cork – Rathmore, County Kerry – Macroom, County Cork
- R583 – Millstreet – Sandpit Cross, County Cork
- R584 – Macroom – Ballylickey, County Cork
- R585 – Crookstown – Kealkill, County Cork
- R586 – Bandon – Bantry, County Cork
- R587 – Macroom – Dunmanway, County Cork
- R588 – Capeen – Clonakilty, County Cork
- R589 – Bandon – Ballyheedy, County Cork
- R590 – Crookstown – Bandon, County Cork
- R591 – Bantry – Crookhaven, County Cork
- R592 – Ballydehob – Toormore, County Cork
- R593 – Skibereen – Drimoleague, County Cork
- R594 – Aghaville – Derreeny, County Cork
- R595 – Skibbereen – Baltimore, County Cork
- R596 – Skibbereen – Castletownshend, County Cork
- R597 – Leap – Glandore – Rosscarbery, County Cork
- R598 – Burgatia Cross – Owenahincha – Tulligee, County Cork
- R599 – Dunmanway – Clonakilty, County Cork

=== R600–R699 ===
- R600 – Cork Airport – Kinsale – Clonakilty, County Cork
- R601 – Timoleague – Courtmacsherry, County Cork
- R602 – Bandon – Timoleague, County Cork
- R603 – Bandon – Garranereagh, County Cork
- R604 – Ballinspittle – Old Head of Kinsale – Barrell Cross, County Cork
- R605 – Innishannon – Kinsale, County Cork
- R606 – Ballythomas Cross – Archdeacon Duggan Bridge, County Cork
- R607 – Halfway – Kinsale, County Cork
- R608 – Washington Street – Ballincollig, Cork
- R609 – Douglas, Cork — Carr's Hill (N28), Cork
- R610 – Cork – Passage West – Raffeen, County Cork
- R611 – Shannonpark – Belgooly, County Cork
- R612 – Carrigaline – Crosshaven, County Cork
- R613 – Ringaskiddy – Ballinhassig, County Cork
- R614 – Cork – Rathcormack, County Cork
- R615 – Cork – Riverstown, County Cork
- R616 – White's Cross – Annacarton Bridge, County Cork
- R617 – Blarney – Cloghroe, County Cork
- R618 – Cork – Coachford – Macroom, County Cork
- R619 – Farnanes – Mallow, County Cork
- R620 – Dromahane – Mallow, County Cork
- R621 – Gortnagross – Newberry Cross, County Cork
- R622 – Cloghroe – Cannon's Cross, County Cork
- R623 – Little Island Loop Road, County Cork
- R624 – Tullagreen – Cobh, County Cork
- R625 – Slatty Water – Carrigtohill; declassified after the N25 split the route in two.
- R626 – Midleton – Rathcormack, County Cork
- R627 – Midleton, County Cork – Tallow, County Waterford
- R628 – Rathcormack, County Cork – Tallow, County Waterford
- R629 – Midleton – Ballycotton, County Cork
- R630 – Ballynacorra – Whitegate, County Cork
- R631 – Cloyne – Rostellan, County Cork
- R632 – Castlemartyr – Shangarry, County Cork
- R633 – Kelly – Ladysbridge, County Cork
- R634 – Youghal, County Cork – Tallow Bridge, County Waterford
- R635 – North Ring Road, Cork
- R637 – Manch West – Drinagh – Skibbereen, County Cork
- R638 – Robb's Bridge – Clyda Bridge Lower, Mallow, County Cork
- R639 – Durrow, County Laois – Cashel – Caher, County Tipperary – Mitchelstown – Fermoy – Dunkettle, County Cork (part of old National Route 8)
- R640 – Knockagh – Caher. County Tipperary
- R641 – Victoria Cross – Doughcloyne, Cork
- R659 – Thurles – Suir Bridge, County Tipperary
- R660 – Thurles – Holycross – Cashel, County Tipperary
- R661 – Holycross – Tipperary, County Tipperary
- R662 – Tipperary – Ballyfauskeen Cross, County Limerick
- R663 – Bansha, County Tipperary – Galbally – Newtown, County Limerick
- R664 – Tipperary – Newtown, County Limerick
- R665 – Mitchelstown, County Cork – Clonmel, County Tipperary
- R666 – Fermoy, County Cork – Lismore, County Waterford
- R667 – Molly Barrys Cross – Ballyderown Cross, County Cork
- R668 – Caher – Clogheen, County Tipperary – Lismore, County Waterford
- R669 – Glentanagree Bridge – Cappoquin, County Waterford
- R670 – Caher – Ardfinnan, County Tipperary
- R670 – Clonmel, County Tipperary – Kilcloher – Piltown Cross, County Waterford
- R670 – Knockaraha Bridge – Ballymacmague – Dungarvan, County Waterford
- R670 – Kielys Cross – Ardmore – Clearys Cross, County Waterford
- R670 – Killongford – Ceann Heilbhic, County Waterford
- R675 – Dungarvan – Tramore – Waterford, County Waterford
- R676 – Lemybrien, County Waterford – Carrick-on-Suir, County Tipperary
- R677 – Carrick-on-Suir, County Tipperary – Seafield, County Waterford
- R678 – Clonmel, County Tipperary – Lowrys Bridge, County Waterford
- R679 – Kilmacthomas, County Waterford
- R680 – Clonmel Carrick-on-Suir, County Tipperary – Ballyduff, County Waterford – Waterford
- R681 – The Sweep – Knockmahon, County Waterford
- R682 – Bawnfune – Tramore, County Waterford
- R683 – Waterford – Passage East, County Waterford
- R684 – Blenheim Cross, Waterford – Dunmore East, County Waterford
- R685 – Kilmacomb – Tramore, County Waterford
- R686 – Morissons Road, Waterford
- R687 – New Inn – Clonmel, County Tipperary
- R688 – Cashel – Clonmel, County Tipperary
- R689 – Urlingford, County Kilkenny – Clonmel, County Tipperary
- R690 – Tranagh – Ninemilehouse, County Tipperary
- R691 – Cashel – Killenaule, County Tipperary – Ballymack, County Kilkenny
- R692 – Cashel – Fethard, County Tipperary – Mullinahone – Callan, County Kilkenny
- R693 – Urlingford, County Kilkenny – Kilkenny
- R694 – Freshford – Ballyragget – Castlecomer, County Kilkenny
- R695 – Kilkenny – Kilmanagh – Callan, County Kilkenny
- R696 – Carrick-on-Suir – Glenbower, County Kilkenny
- R697 – Carrick-on-Suir, County Tipperary – Kilkenny
- R698 – Callan – Baunreagh – Pilltown, County Kilkenny – Mountbelton, County Waterford
- R699 – Callan – Knocktopher, County Kilkenny

=== R700–R774 ===
- R700 – Kilkenny – Thomastown, County Kilkenny – New Ross, County Wexford
- R701 – Kilmaganny – Sheepstown, County Kilkenny
- R702 – Coolgrange – Gowran, County Kilkenny – Enniscorthy, County Wexford
- R703 – Thomastown, County Kilkenny – Ballymurphy County Carlow
- R704 – Mullinavat, County Kilkenny – New Ross, County Wexford
- R705 – Leighlinbridge – Borris, County Carlow – Stripes, County Kilkenny
- R706 – Fethard – Kilsheelan, County Tipperary
- R707 – Ballingarrane – Moangarriff – Clonmel, County Tipperary
- R708 – Waterford – Waterford Airport – Kilmacleague, County Waterford
- R709 – Inner Ring Road, Waterford
- R710 – Outer Ring Road, Waterford
- R711 – Waterford – Slieveroe, County Kilkenny
- R712 – Kilkenny – Paulstown, County Kilkenny (part of old National Route 10)
- R713 – Danesfort – Ballyhale, County Kilkenny (part of old National Route 10)
- R714 – Corcoran's Cross Roundabout (N30) – Mountelliott (part of old National Route 30)
- R724 – Royaloak – Bagenalstown – Kildavin, County Carlow
- R725 – Carlow – Tullow, County Carlow – Gorey, County Wexford
- R726 – Rathvilly – Carlow, County Carlow
- R727 – Straboe – Hacketstown, County Carlow
- R728 – Carlow ring road; decommissioned in April 2006.
- R729 – Borris, County Carlow – New Ross, County Wexford
- R730 – Kiltealy, County Wexford – Wexford
- R731 – Ballynabanoge – Ballinlug East, County Wexford
- R732 – Coolnaveagh – Raheenagurren East, County Wexford
- R733 – New Ross – Arthurstown – Wellingtonbridge, County Wexford – Wexford
- R734 – Slaght – Hook Head, County Wexford
- R735 – Dunmain – Ballymackesy, County Wexford
- R736 – Ballynabola – Wellingtonbridge – Rosslare, County Wexford
- R737 – Haggard – Duncannon, County Wexford
- R738 – Ballyhit – Waddingtown – Baldwinstown, County Wexford
- R739 – Ballykilliane – Kilmore Quay, County Wexford
- R740 – Ballybrennan Big – Rosslare, County Wexford
- R741 – Wexford – Castlebridge – Gorey, County Wexford
- R742 – Faheys Cross – Courtown – Gorey, County Wexford
- R743 – Curracloe – White Gap, County Wexford
- R744 – Enniscorthy – Blackwater, County Wexford
- R745 – Wheelagower – Ferns, County Wexford
- R746 – Wheelagower – Bunclody, County Wexford – Croneyhorn, County Wicklow
- R747 – Mullmast, County Kildare – Hacketstown, County Carlow – Arklow, County Wicklow
- R748 – Carnew – Tinahely, County Wicklow
- R749 – Shillelagh – Tinahely, County Wicklow
- R750 – Arklow – Wicklow – Rathnew, County Wicklow
- R751 – Wicklow – The Beehive, County Wicklow
- R752 – Rathnew – Woodenbridge, County Wicklow
- R753 – Aughrim – Ballinacarrig, County Wicklow
- R754 – Avoca – Ballinacor, County Wicklow
- R755 – Rathdrum – Laragh – Kilmacanogue, County Wicklow
- R756 – Laragh – Wicklow Gap – Dunlavin, County Wicklow
- R757 – Laragh – Glendalough, County Wicklow
- R758 – Lockstown – Burgage Moyle, County Wicklow
- R759 – Tinode – Sally Gap – Draghmore, County Wicklow
- R760 – Enniskerry – Killough, County Wicklow
- R761 – Rathnew – Kilcoole – Bray, County Wicklow
- R762 – Greystones – Glen of the Downs, County Wicklow
- R763 – Ashford – Annamoe, County Wicklow
- R764 – Ashford – Roundwood, County Wicklow
- R765 – Newtownmountkennedy – Roundwood, County Wicklow
- R766 – The Strand, Bray, County Wicklow
- R767 – Bray – Hollybrook, County Wicklow
- R768 – Southern Ring Road, Bray, County Wicklow
- R769 – Ballindinas, County Wexford – Wexford
- R770 – Arthurstown – Ballyhack, County Wexford
- R772 – Newtownmountkennedy – Ashford – Rathnew – Arklow, County Wicklow – Gorey, County Wexford (part of old National Route 11)
- R773 – Jack White's Cross – Brittas, County Wicklow
- R774 – Willow Grove – Charlesland, County Wicklow

=== R801–R899 ===
- R801 – North Wall, Dublin
- R802 – Dorset Street – Bath Road, Dublin
- R803 – Summerhill – Parnell Street, Dublin
- R804 – Granvy Row – Cork Street, Dublin
- R805 – Ellis Quay – Finglas, Dublin
- R806 – Blanchardstown – Manor Street, Dublin
- R807 – Clontarf Road, Dublin
- R808 – Artane – Clontarf, Dublin
- R809 – Raheny – Baldoyle, County Dublin
- R810 – Cornmarket – Inchicore, Dublin
- R811 – South Circular Road, Dublin
- R812 – Davitt Road, Dublin
- R813 – City Quay, Dublin
- R814 – Lombard Street East, Dublin
- R815 – Westland Row – Donnybrook, Dublin
- R815 – Baggot Street, Dublin
- R817 – Harolds Cross – Ballyboden, County Dublin
- R818 – Terenure – Walkinstown Roundabout, County Dublin
- R819 – Long Mile Road – Tallaght Village, County Dublin
- R820 – Rathmines – Milltown, Dublin
- R821 – Rathfarnham – Churchtown, Dublin
- R822 – Grange Road, Rathfarnham, County Dublin
- R823 – Ballyboden – Grange Road; now part of the R113.
- R824 – Ailesbury Road, Dublin
- R825 – Milltown – Blackrock, County Dublin
- R826 – Wyckham Way, Dundrum, County Dublin
- R827 – Blackrock – Cornelscourt, County Dublin
- R828 – Stradbrook Road, Killiney, County Dublin
- R829 – Monkstown – Dalkey, County Dublin
- R830 – Foxrock – Dún Laoghaire, County Dublin
- R831 – Sandycove Seafront, County Dublin
- R832 – Glasthule – Ballybrack
- R833 – Ballyfermot Road, Dublin
- R834 – Embankment Road, Clontarf, Dublin
- R835 – Woodville – Cooldrinagh, County Dublin
- R836 – Miltonsfields – Newtown
- R837 – Loughlinstown – Shankill, County Dublin
- R838 – Walkinstown Embankment Road, County Dublin
- R839 – Inchicore – Kilmainham, Dublin
- R840 – Earlsfort Terrace, Dublin
- R841 – Darndale – Clongriffen; became a portion of the new R139 in 2012.
- R842 – Golden Ball – Cornellscourt, County Dublin
- R843 – Snugborough Road, Blanchardstown, County Dublin
- R846 – Sundays Well Road, Cork
- R847 – Christy Ring Bridge – Washington Street, Cork
- R848 – Grand Parade, Cork
- R849 – Glasheen Road and Bishopstown Road, Cork
- R851 – South Douglas Road and Grange Road, Cork
- R852 – Boreenmanagh Road and Skehard Road, Cork
- R853 – Well Road and Blackroad Road, Cork
- R854 – Saint Patricks Quay, Cork
- R857 – Ennis Road, Limerick
- R858 – Lord Edward Street and New Road, Limerick
- R859 – Mungret – Quinns Cross, Limerick
- R860 – Saint Johns Street, Waterford
- R861 – Grannagh – Newrath, County Kilkenny
- R863 – Eglinton Street and University Road, Galway
- R864 – Salthill Road and Newcastle Road, Galway
- R865 – Ballybane Road, Galway
- R866 – Headford Road, Galway
- R867 – Church Square, Monaghan
- R868 – Fermanagh Street, Clones, County Monaghan
- R869 – Letterkenny – Letterkenny Hospital
- R870 – Pearse Road and Markievicz Road, Sligo
- R871 – Clon Road and Gort Road, Ennis, County Clare
- R872 – Market Square – James Fintan Lalor Avenue
- R873 – Mitchell Street, Nenagh, County Tipperary
- R874 – North Circular Road, Tralee, County Kerry
- R875 – Castle Street, Tralee, County Kerry
- R876 – Park Road and High Street, Killarney, County Kerry
- R877 – Port Road, Killarney, County Kerry
- R878 – Oakpark Road Tralee County Kerry replacing portion of N69 in Tralee
- R880 – Facksbridge – Miles, Clonakilty, County Cork
- R883 – Main Street, Mallow, County Cork
- R884 – Irishtown, Clonmel, County Tipperary
- R885 – Main Street, Carrick-on-Suir, County Tipperary
- R886 – New Road, Kilkenny
- R887 – Wolfe Tone Street and John Street, Kilkenny
- R888 – Dublin Road, Carlow
- R889 – John Street, Wexford
- R890 – Blackstoops – Saint Johns Road, Enniscorthy, County Wexford
- R891 – Market Square – Chapel Street, Athenry, County Galway
- R895 – Cannon Row, Navan, County Meath
- R896 – Ludlow Street, Navan, County Meath
- R898 – Castle Street, Trim, County Meath; became a portion of the R933 in 2012.
- R899 – Greenhills Road, Drogheda, County Louth

=== R900–R999 ===
- R900 – West Street, Drogheda, County Louth
- R901 – Main Street, Cavan
- R902 – Bridge Street, Boyle, County Roscommon
- R903 – Main Street, Carrick-on-Shannon, County Leitrim
- R904 – Dunloe Street, Ballinasloe, County Galway
- R907 – Main Street, Midleton, County Cork
- R908 – The Front Strand, Youghal, County Cork
- R909 – College Road, Kilkenny
- R910 – Waterford Road, Kilkenny
- R911 – Clogherane – Abbeyside, Dungarvan, County Waterford
- R912 – Jordanstown – Paulstown, County Kilkenny
- R913 – Mitchelstown Road – The Square, Caher, County Tipperary
- R914 – Roscommon Road, Athlone, County Westmeath
- R915 – Ballymahon Road, Athlone, County Westmeath
- R916 – Waterhouse Road, Athlone, County Westmeath
- R917 – Spencer Street, Castlebar, County Mayo
- R918 – Little Bray – Fassaroe, Bray, County Wicklow
- R919 – Killerisk Road, Tralee, County Kerry
- R920 – Cloghore – Belleek Bridge, County Donegal
- R921 – Merlin Park – Droughiska, Galway
- R922 – Abbeyleix Road, Portlaoise, County Laois; became a portion of the N77 in February 2012.
- R923 – Bishop Street, Tuam, County Galway (old N83), downgraded in October 2018.
- R924 – Church Street, Carlow, County Carlow
- R925 – Killybegs Road, Donegal, County Donegal
- R926 – Dooradoyle, County Limerick
- R927 – Main Street, Carrickmacross, County Monaghan
- R928 – Pearse Street, Ballina, County Mayo
- R929 – Main Street, Ballyhaunis, County Mayo
- R930 – Shortcastle Street, Mallow, County Cork
- R931 – Bridge Street, Skibbereen, County Cork
- R932 – Golden Road, Cashel, County Tipperary
- R933 – Castle Street and Haggard Street, Trim, County Meath
- R934 – Castletown Road, Dundalk, County Louth
- R935 – Bellananagh Road, Cavan
- R936 – Allingham Road, Ballyshannon, County Donegal
- R937 – Dublin Road, Monaghan
- R938 – Dublin Road, Castleblaney, County Monaghan
- R940 – Ramelton Road, Letterkenny, County Donegal
- R941 – Kells, County Meath
- R942 – Tuam, County Galway (old N17)
- R999 – Wicklow Port Access Road, County Wicklow; number may be a mistake as is normally used as a placeholder on sample road signs.

== See also ==
- Roads in Ireland
- History of roads in Ireland
