= R365 road =

R365 road may refer to:

- R365 road (Ireland)
- R365 road (South Africa)
