= R211 road (Ireland) =

Road in Ireland

Coordinates: 53.847389°N 6.409546°W

R211 road
- Bóthar R211

Route information
- Length: 1.8 km (1.1 mi)

Major junctions
- From: R132 Cappoge
- M1 Junction 13
- To: R170 Mooremount

Location
- Country: Ireland

Highway system
- Roads in Ireland; Motorways; Primary; Secondary; Regional

The R211 road is a regional road in Ireland, located in County Louth, located north of Dunleer.
