= R641 road (Ireland) =

Regional road in Ireland

R641 road
- Bóthar R641
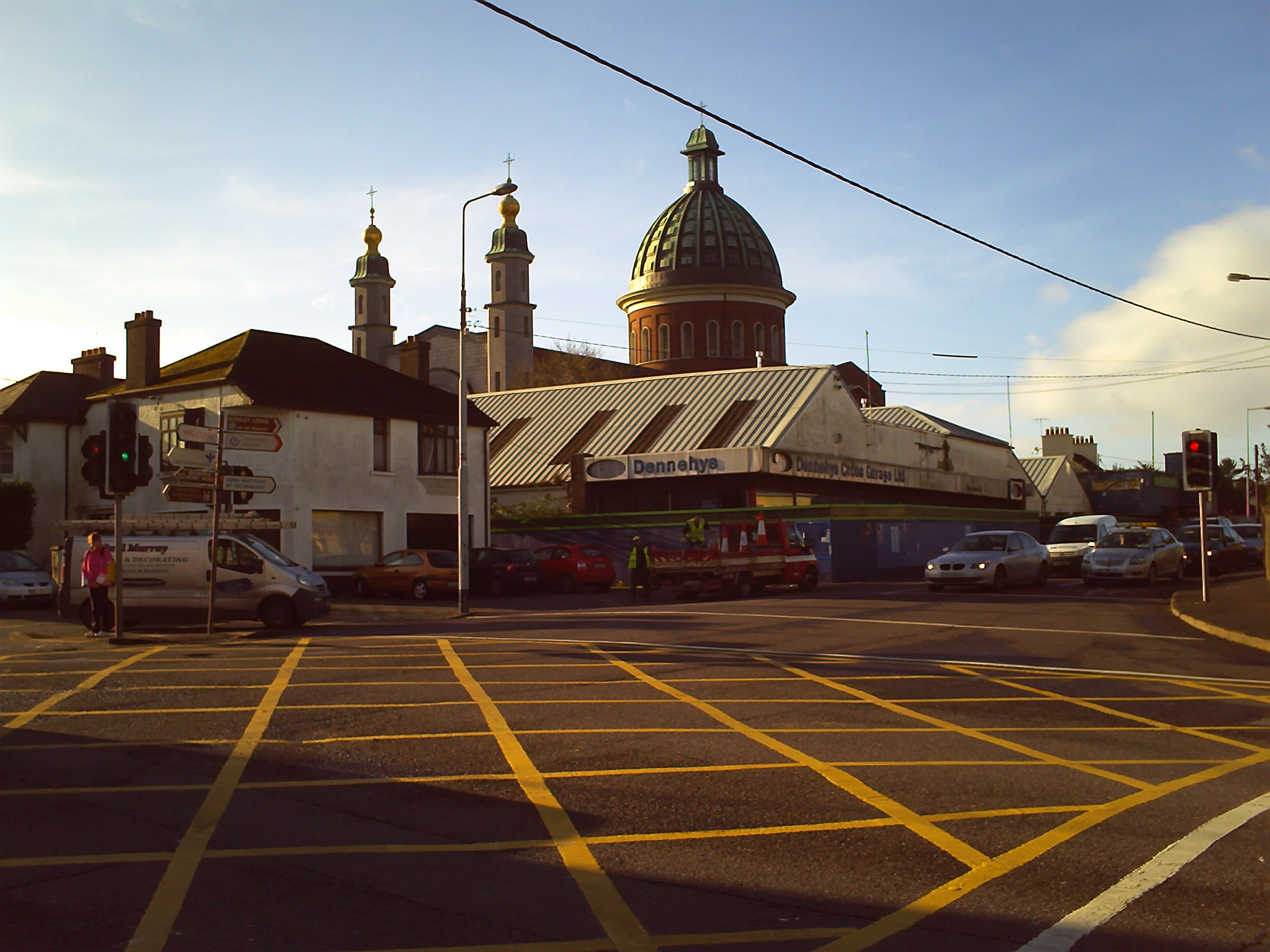
- Church of the Descent of the Holy Spirit, Dennehys Cross, at the junction of the R641 and R608 roads

Route information
- Length: 1.9 km (1.2 mi)

Major junctions
- From: N22 at Victoria Cross
- R608 at Dennehys Cross; R849 at Wilton Roundabout
- To: N40 at Doughcloyne

Location
- Country: Ireland

Highway system
- Roads in Ireland; Motorways; Primary; Secondary; Regional
← R640	→ R659

The R641 road is a regional road in Cork, Ireland. It connects the N22 road to the N40 (Cork South Ring Road), via Wilton. The road is 1.9 kilometres (1.2 mi) long. The road was formerly part and known as the N71.
