= R229 road (Ireland) =

Road in Ireland

Coordinates: 53.483133°N 8.507359°W

R229 road
- Bóthar R229
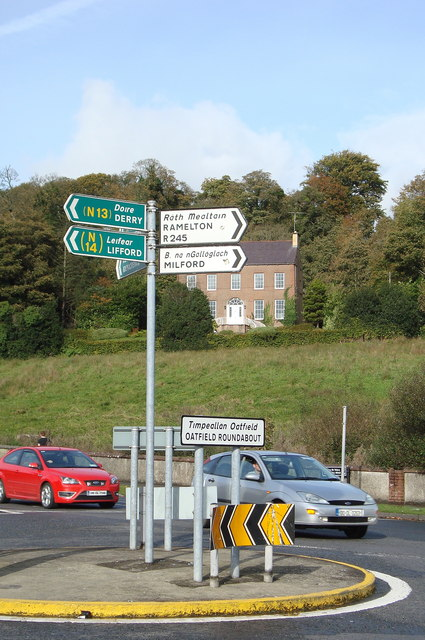
- The Oatfield Roundabout, where the R229 and R940 meet.

Route information
- Length: 2.5 km (1.6 mi)

Major junctions
- From: N56 Letterkenny (Knocknamona Roundabout)
- R940 Letterkenny (Oatfield Roundabout); R250 Letterkenny (Station Roundabout)
- To: N56 Letterkenny (Polestar Roundabout)

Location
- Country: Ireland

Highway system
- Roads in Ireland; Motorways; Primary; Secondary; Regional

The R229 road is a short regional road in Ireland, located in Letterkenny, County Donegal.
