= R670 road (Ireland) =

Regional road in Ireland

R670 road
- Bóthar R670
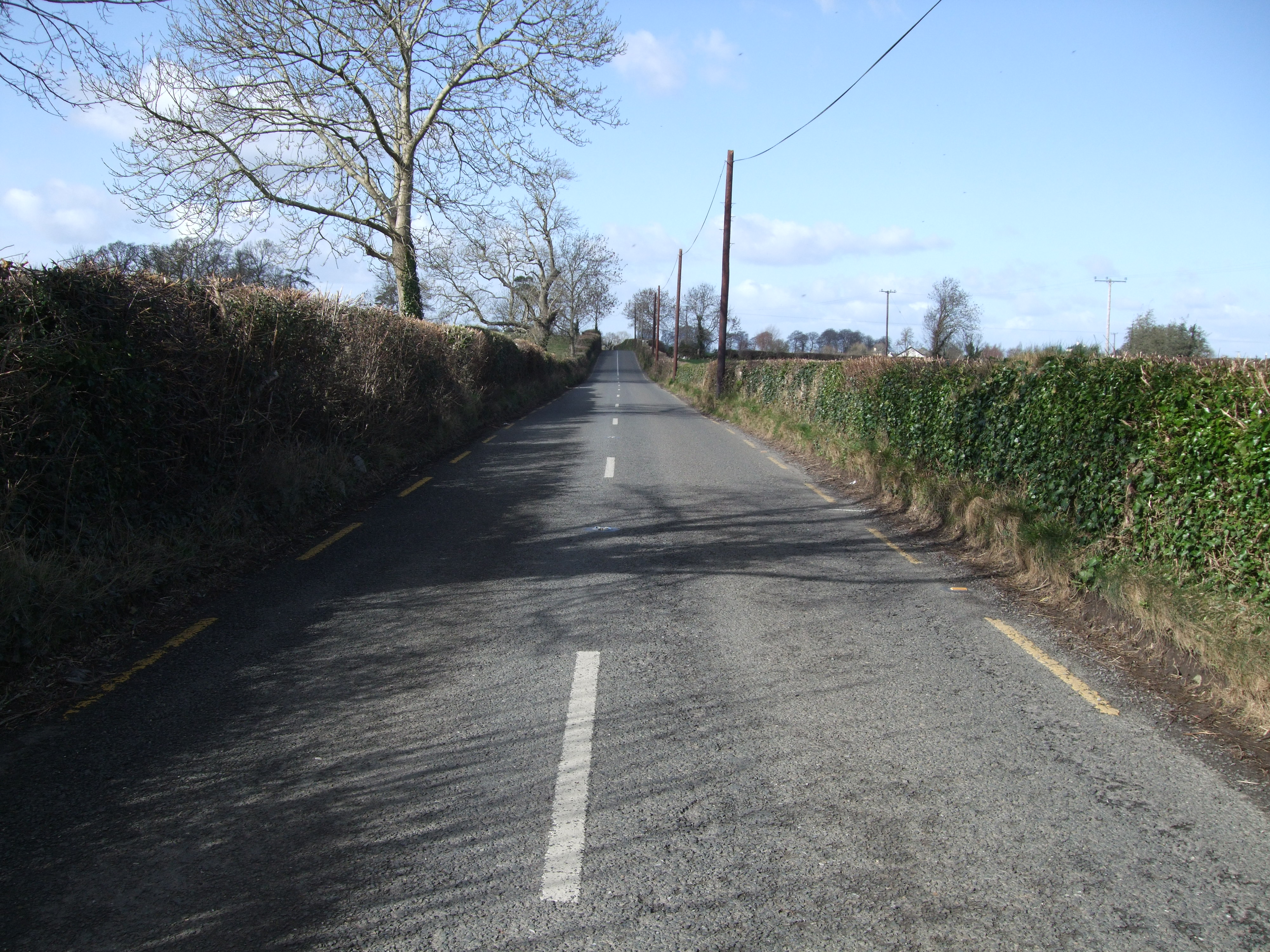
- The R670 between Cahir and Ardfinnan

Major junctions
- From: R639 at Cloghabreedy, County Tipperary

- R640 at The Square, Cahir; R913 at The Square, Cahir

- To: R665 at Main Street, Ardfinnan

Location
- Country: Ireland

Highway system
- Roads in Ireland; Motorways; Primary; Secondary; Regional
← R669	→ R671

The R670 road is a regional road in Ireland. The route runs from its junction with the R639 and N24 at Cloughabreeda 2 km north of Cahir through Cahir town and onwards for a further 8 km to Ardfinnan, where it joins the R665 road. The R670 is located entirely in County Tipperary.

The section of the R670 from Cloughabreeda to Cahir town centre was the main road connecting Cahir with Cashel in 1714 and was part of the T9 prior to 1974, when it was renumbered as part of the Dublin-Cork N8 national primary route. When the N8 was realigned to run southwest of Cahir in 1990, the old section of the road was reclassified as a regional road, and incorporated into the existing R670.

== See also ==
- Roads in Ireland
- National primary road
- History of roads in Ireland
- Trunk roads in Ireland
