= R166 road (Ireland) =

Road in County Louth, Ireland

Coordinates: 53.744649°N 6.296101°W

R166 road
- Bóthar R166
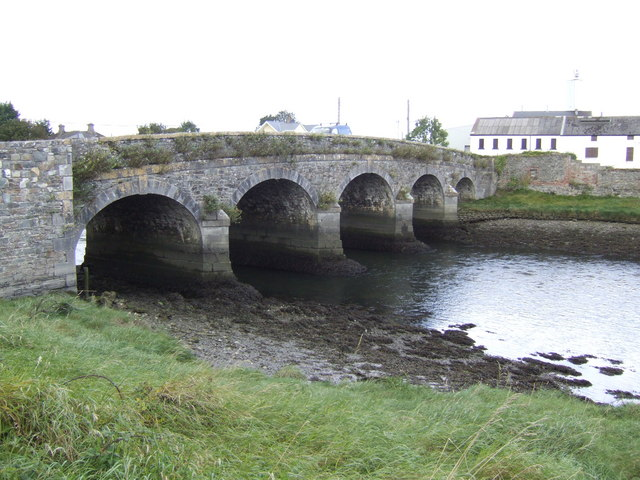
- The Annagassan Bridge carries the R166 over the River Dee

Route information
- Length: 41.8 km (26.0 mi)

Major junctions
- From: R246 Tallanstown
- N52 Gilbertstown; M1 Junction 15; R132 Castlebellingham; Crosses River Dee; Passes through Annagassan; R170 Murray's Cross; Passes through Clogherhead; R167 Termonfeckin; R899 Drogheda (Newfoundwell Road)
- To: R132 Drogheda (Patrick Street)

Location
- Country: Ireland

Highway system
- Roads in Ireland; Motorways; Primary; Secondary; Regional

The R166 road is a regional road in Ireland, located in County Louth.
