= R197 road (Ireland) =

Road in Ireland

Coordinates: 54.239507°N 7.084083°W

R197 road
- Bóthar R197
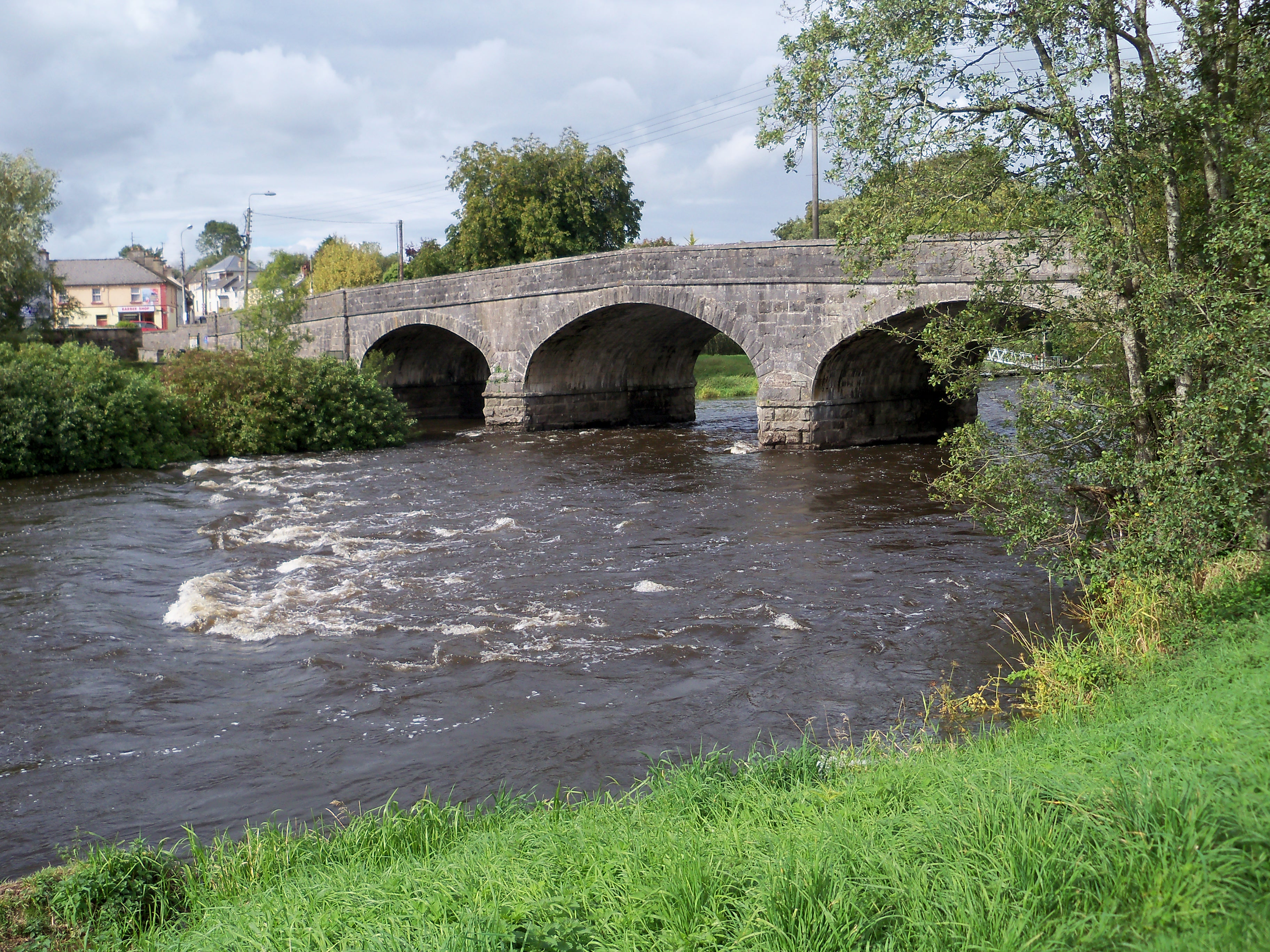
- The R197 crosses the Erne at Kilconny Bridge

Route information
- Length: 4.3 km (2.7 mi)

Major junctions
- From: N3 / N87 Staghall Roundabout
- To: N54 Corrarod (Gannon's Cross)

Location
- Country: Ireland

Highway system
- Roads in Ireland; Motorways; Primary; Secondary; Regional

The R197 road is a regional road in Ireland, located in County Cavan.
