= R665 road (Ireland) =

Road in Ireland

R665 road
- Bóthar R665
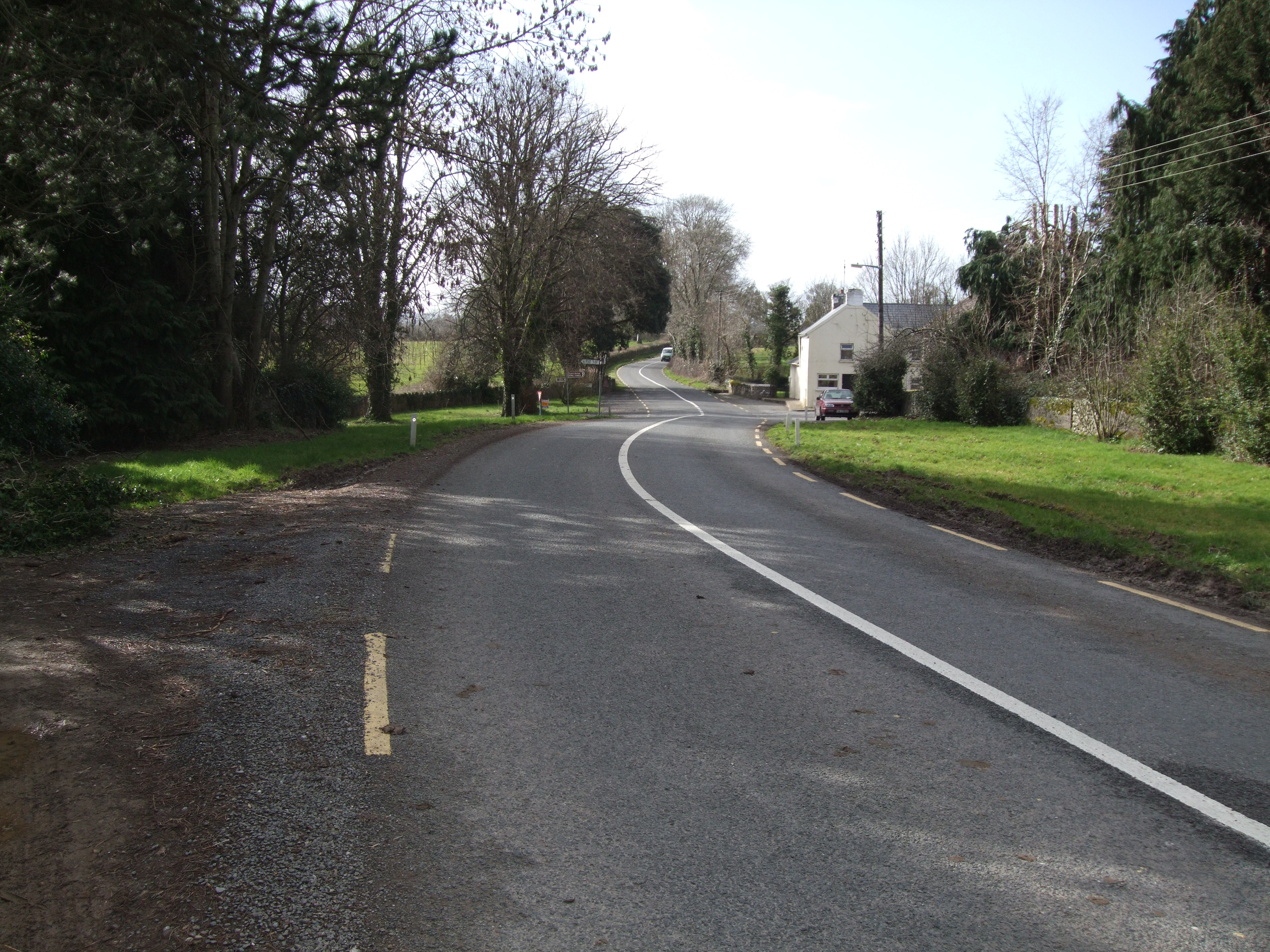
- The R665 road between Ardfinnan and Clogheen

Major junctions
- From: N73 at Stag Park, County Cork
- R513 at Upper Cork Street, Mitchelstown; M8 at Kilshanny; Enter County Tipperary; R668 at Clogheen; Cross River Suir at Ardfinnan; R670 at Ardfinnan; Cross River Suir, enter County Waterford; R671 at Kilmacomma; Cross River Suir, enter County Tipperary

- To: R884 at Irishtown Upper, Clonmel, County Tipperary

Location
- Country: Ireland

Highway system
- Roads in Ireland; Motorways; Primary; Secondary; Regional
← R664	→ R666

The R665 road is a regional road in Ireland. The route runs from Mitchelstown to Clonmel via Ballyporeen, Clogheen and Ardfinnan, passing through parts of counties Cork, Tipperary and Waterford. The R665 was once a key part of the historic route from Dublin to Cork and was mapped as such as late as 1778. A turnpike road, it was also a key part of the route linking Mallow with Dublin, via today's N73.

== See also ==
- Roads in Ireland
- Motorways in the Republic of Ireland
- National secondary road
- Trunk roads in Ireland
- History of roads in Ireland
