= R124 road (Ireland) =

Road in Ireland

R124 road
- Bóthar R124
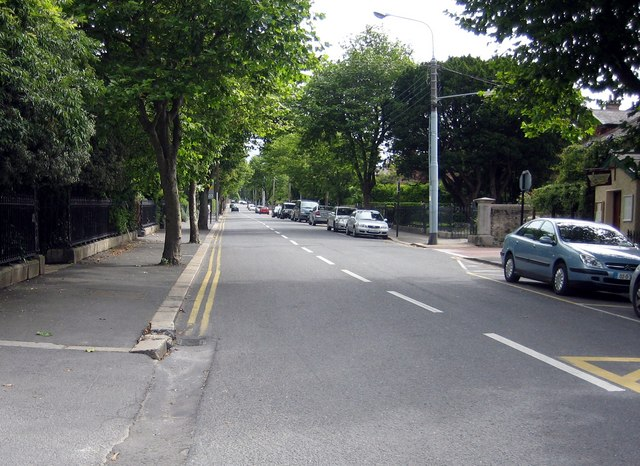
- Church Road, Malahide, on the R124 (in 2007)

Location
- Country: Ireland

Highway system
- Roads in Ireland; Motorways; Primary; Secondary; Regional

The R124 road is a regional road in Fingal, Ireland.

The official description of the R124 from the Roads Act 1993 (Classification of Regional Roads) Order 2012 reads:

R124: Snugborough - Malahide, County Dublin

Between its junction with R123 at Snugborough and its junction with R106 at The Mall Malahide via Hazelbrook; and Church Road at Malahide all in the county of Fingal.

== See also ==
- Roads in Ireland
- National primary road
- National secondary road
- Regional road
