= R123 road (Ireland) =

Road in Ireland

R123 road
- Bóthar R123

Location
- Country: Ireland

Highway system
- Roads in Ireland; Motorways; Primary; Secondary; Regional

The R123 road is a regional road in Fingal, Ireland.

The official description of the R123 from the Roads Act 1993 (Classification of Regional Roads) Order 2012 reads:

R123: Maynetown - Balgriffin, County Dublin

Between its junction with R106 at Maynetown and its junction with R107 at Balgriffin via Snugborough and Balgriffin Park all in the county of Fingal.

== See also ==
- Roads in Ireland
- National primary road
- National secondary road
- Regional road
