= R940 road (Ireland) =

Regional road in Ireland

Coordinates: 54.953447°N 7.720742°W

R940 road
- Bóthar R940

Route information
- Length: 1.2 km (0.75 mi)

Major junctions
- From: R229 Letterkenny (Port Road)
- To: N56 Letterkenny (Ramelton Road)

Location
- Country: Ireland

Highway system
- Roads in Ireland; Motorways; Primary; Secondary; Regional

The R940 road is a short regional road in Ireland, located in Letterkenny, County Donegal.
