= R691 road (Ireland) =

Road in Ireland

R691 road
- Bóthar R691
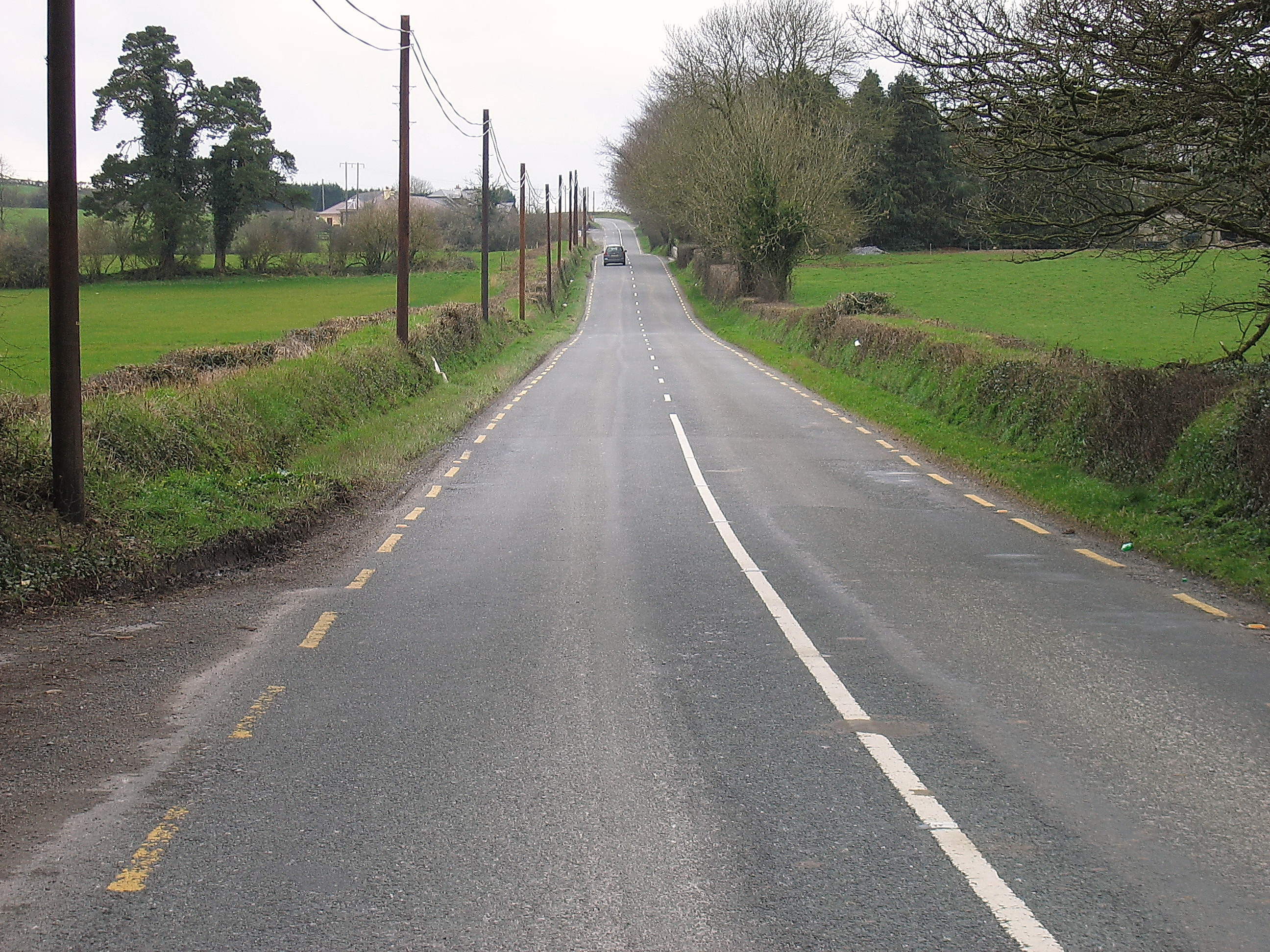
- R691 west of Dualla, looking towards Cashel

Route information
- Length: 46 km (29 mi)

Location
- Country: Ireland
- Primary destinations: County Tipperary; Cashel leave Town Centre cross over the N8; Dualla; Ballinure; Join R689; Killenaule leave R689; R690; Ballingarry; County Kilkenny; Ballyline R695; N76

Highway system
- Roads in Ireland; Motorways; Primary; Secondary; Regional

The R691 road is a regional road in Ireland which runs west-east from the centre of Cashel in County Tipperary to the N76 near Callan in County Kilkenny. The route is 46 km (29 mi) long.

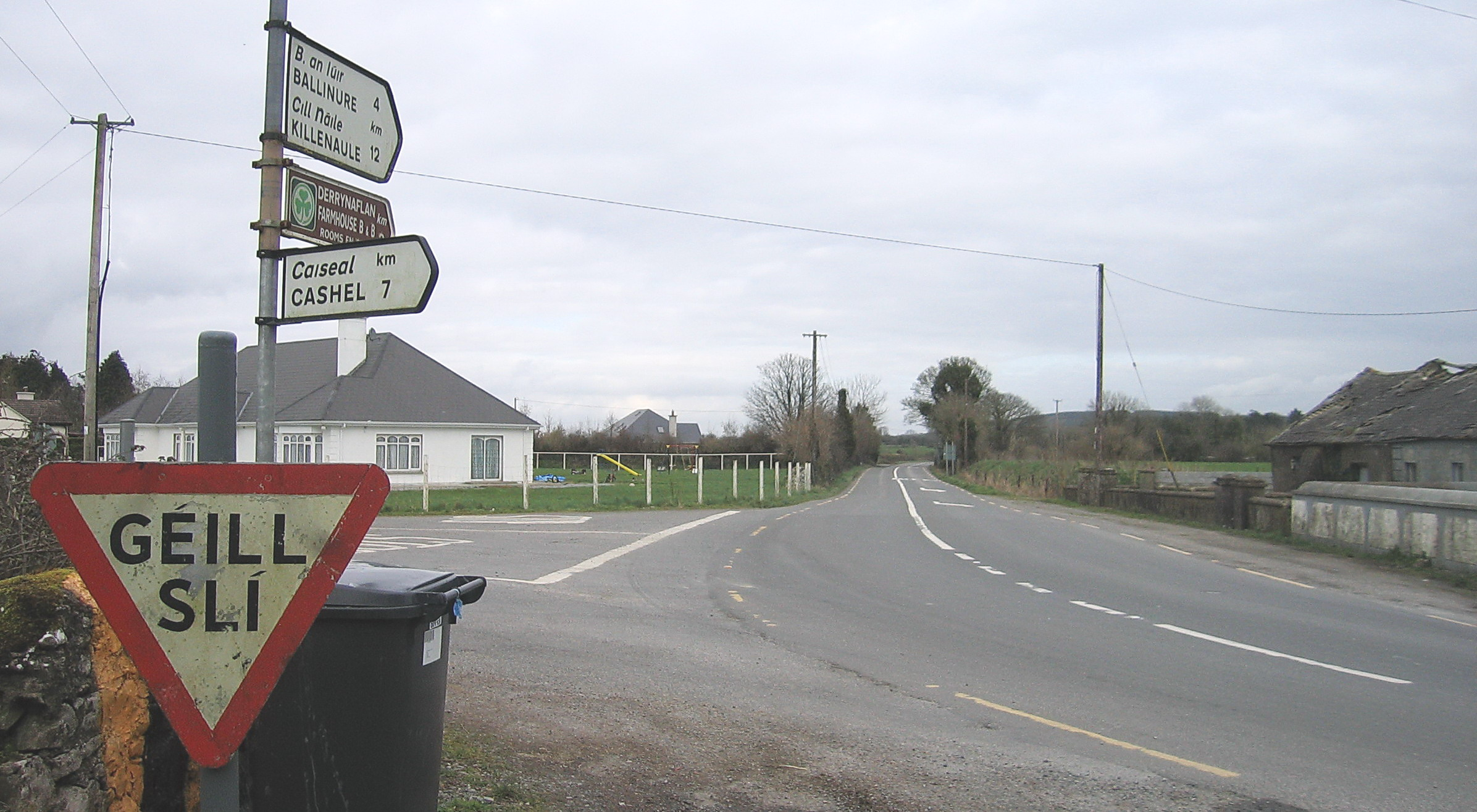
R691 north of Dualla with Irish-language Yield sign on a connecting local road

== See also ==
- Roads in Ireland
- National primary road
- National secondary road
