= R167 road (Ireland) =

Regional road in County Louth, Ireland

Coordinates: 53.751390°N 6.274250°W

R167 road
- Bóthar R167
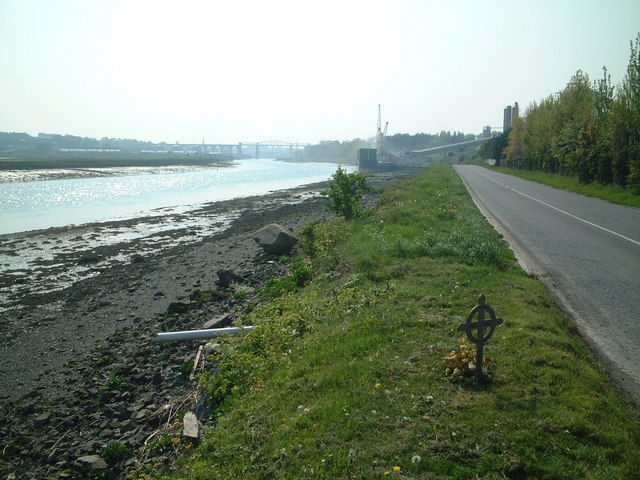
- Strand Road east of Drogheda, part of the R167

Route information
- Length: 8.7 km (5.4 mi)

Major junctions
- From: R166 Termonfeckin
- R899 Drogheda (Strand Road); R900 Drogheda (North Quay); R150 Drogheda (Bull Ring)
- To: R132 Drogheda (Bull Ring)

Location
- Country: Ireland

Highway system
- Roads in Ireland; Motorways; Primary; Secondary; Regional

The R167 road is a regional road in Ireland, located in County Louth.
