= R808 road (Ireland) =

Road in Ireland

R808 road
- Bóthar R808
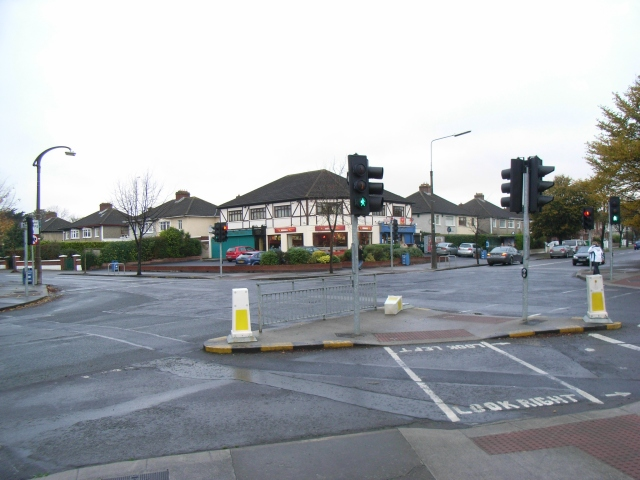
- Vernon Avenue, Clontarf, on the R808

Location
- Country: Ireland
- Primary destinations: Dublin

Highway system
- Roads in Ireland; Motorways; Primary; Secondary; Regional

The R808 road is a regional road in Dublin, Ireland.

The official definition of the R808 from the Roads Act 1993 (Classification of Regional Roads) Order 2006 states:

R808: Artane - Clontarf, Dublin

Between its junction with R107 at Malahide Road and its junction with R807 at Clontarf Road via Gracefield Road, Brookwood Avenue, Sybil Hill and Vernon Avenue all in the city of Dublin.

== See also ==
- Roads in Ireland
- Regional road
