= R256 road (Ireland) =

Road in Ireland

Coordinates: 55.119061°N 8.070878°W

R256 road
- Bóthar R256
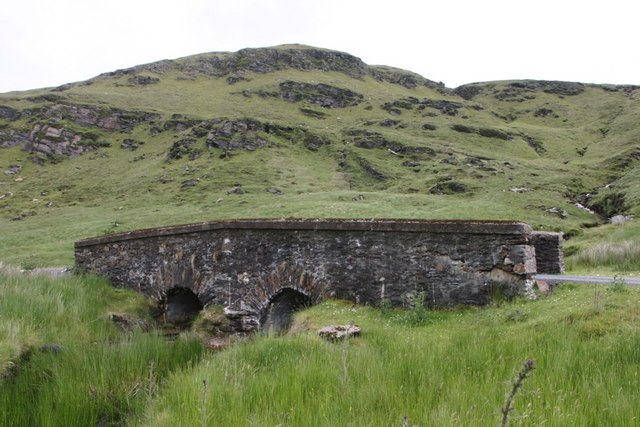
- Meennasarudda Bridge (Mín Easa Roda), part of the R256

Route information
- Length: 12.8 km (8.0 mi)

Major junctions
- From: Ballyness Beach
- N56 Falcarragh
- To: R251 Delvin

Location
- Country: Ireland

Highway system
- Roads in Ireland; Motorways; Primary; Secondary; Regional

The R256 road is a regional road in Ireland, located in northwest County Donegal.
