= R379 road (Ireland) =

Road in Ireland

Coordinates: 53.554338°N 10.103946°W

R379 road
- Bóthar R379
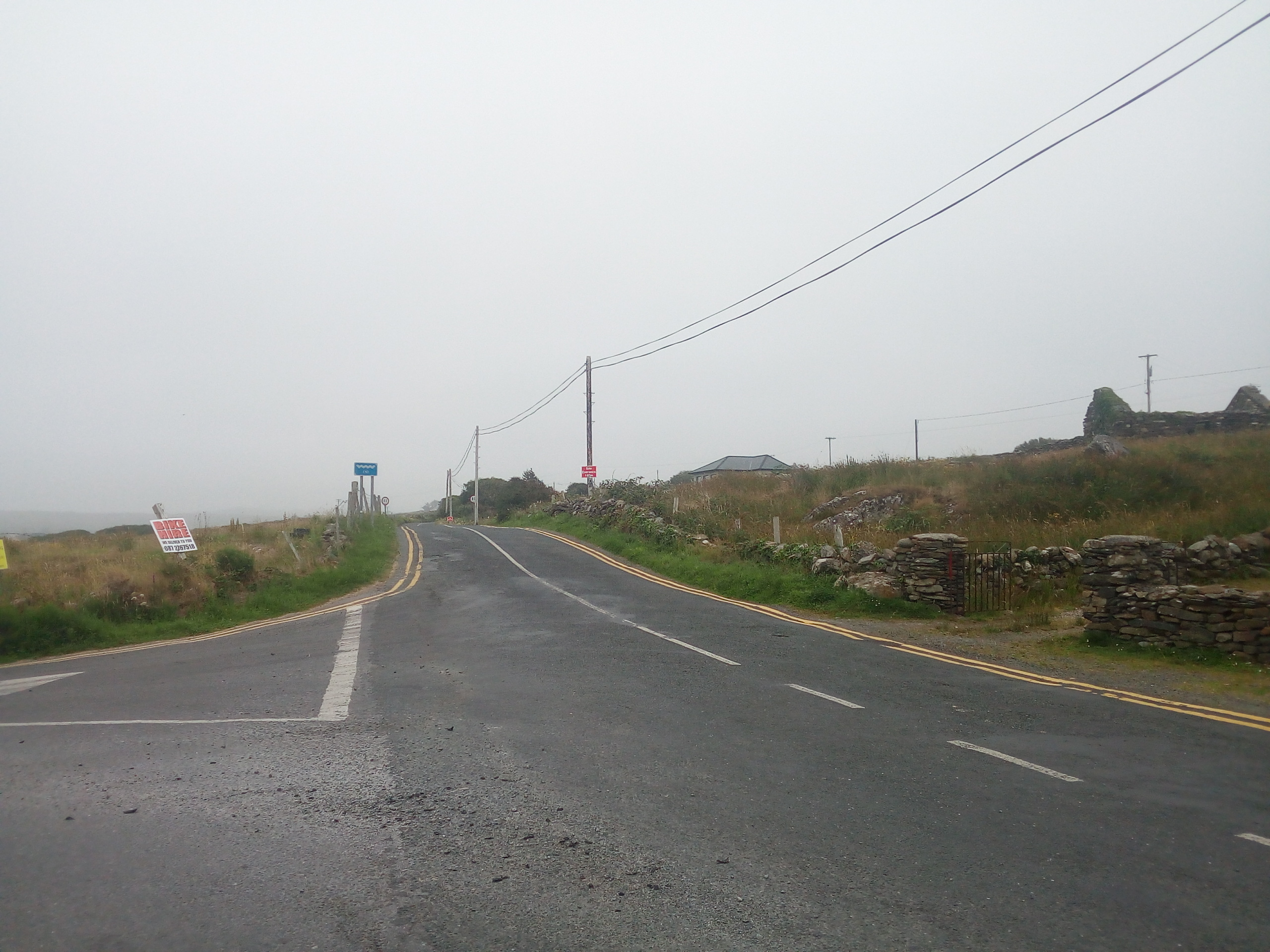
- Near Cleggan

Route information
- Length: 7.3 km (4.5 mi)

Major junctions
- From: Cleggan
- To: N59 Streamstown

Location
- Country: Ireland

Highway system
- Roads in Ireland; Motorways; Primary; Secondary; Regional

The R379 road is a regional road in Ireland, located in County Galway.
