= R255 road (Ireland) =

Road in Ireland

Coordinates: 55.046643°N 7.857481°W

R255 road
- Bóthar R255
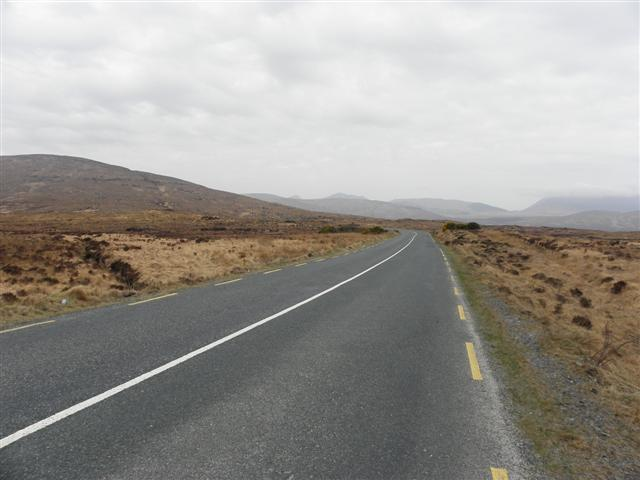
- R255 at Ballybuninabber

Route information
- Length: 5.8 km (3.6 mi)

Major junctions
- From: R251 Ballybuninabber
- To: N56 Termon

Location
- Country: Ireland

Highway system
- Roads in Ireland; Motorways; Primary; Secondary; Regional

The R255 road is a regional road in Ireland, located in County Donegal.
