= R488 road (Ireland) =

Road in Ireland

Coordinates: 52.616098°N 9.714400°W

R488 road
- Bóthar R488
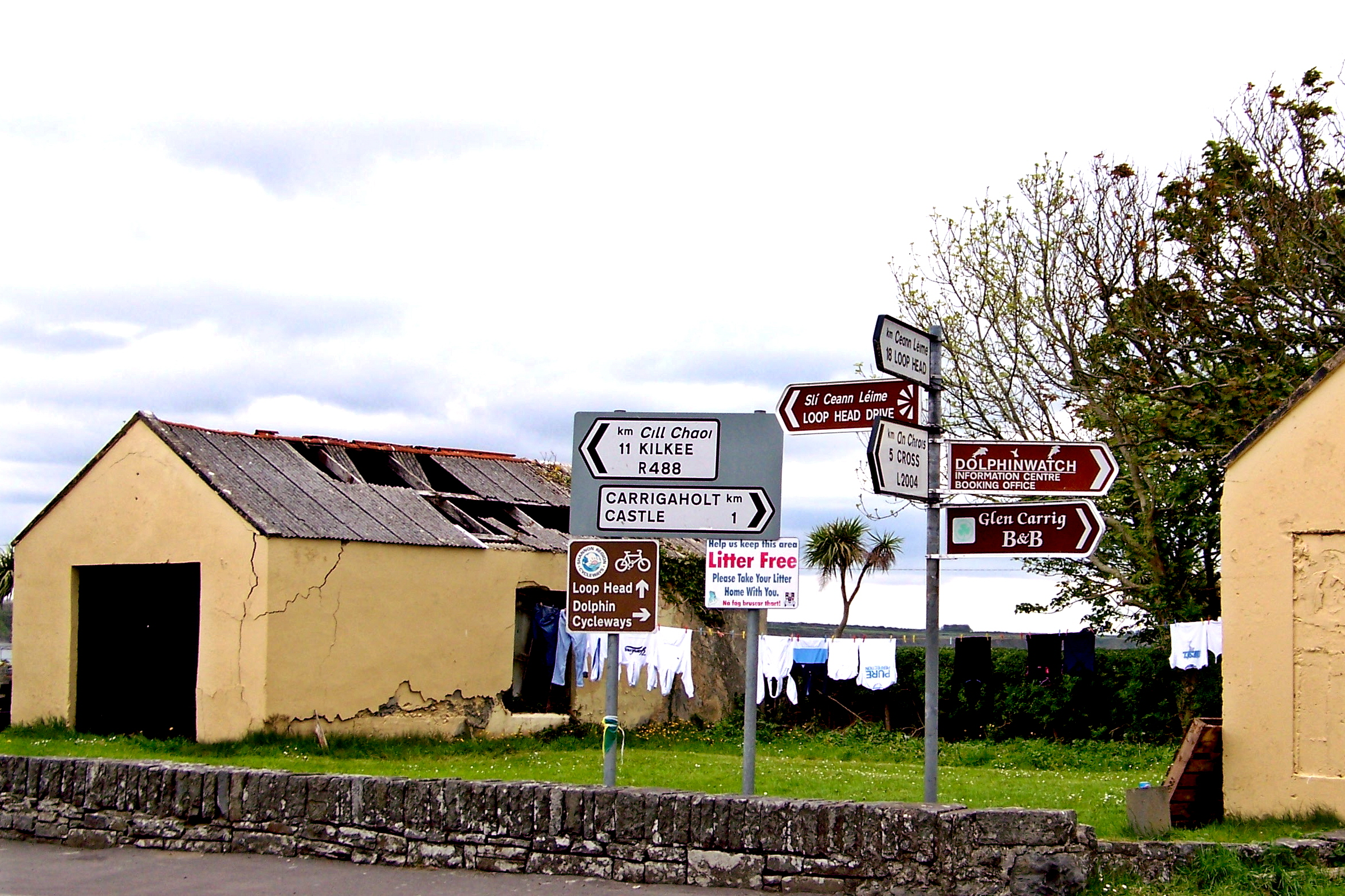
- At the start of the R488 in Carrigaholt

Route information
- Length: 4.1 km (2.5 mi)

Major junctions
- From: R487 Breaghva
- Crosses Moyarta River
- To: Carrigaholt

Location
- Country: Ireland

Highway system
- Roads in Ireland; Motorways; Primary; Secondary; Regional

The R488 road is a regional road in Ireland, located in County Clare.
