= Dualla, County Tipperary =

Dualla Dumha Aille
- Village
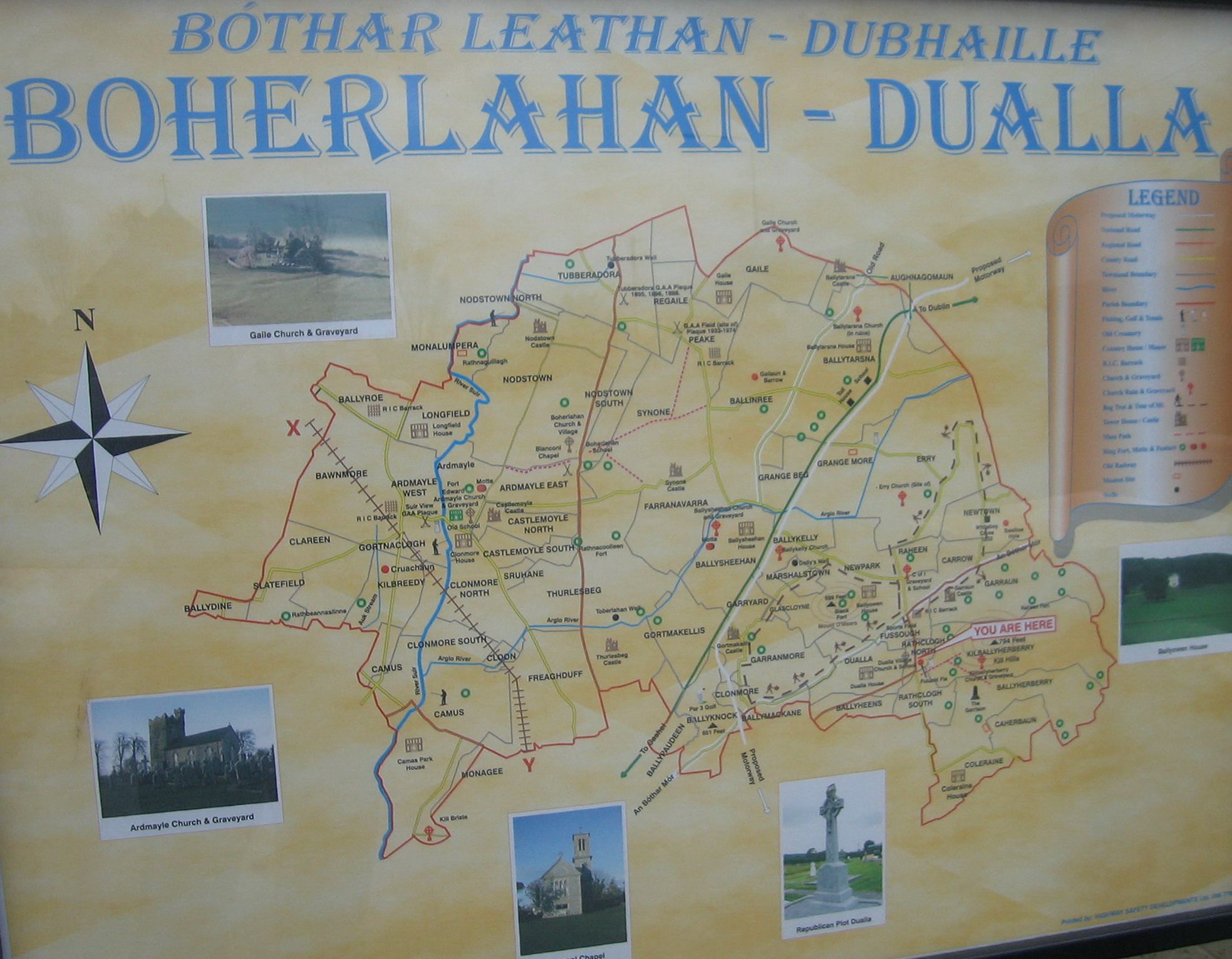
- Boherlahan-Dualla tourist sign in Dualla village

- Location in Ireland
- Coordinates: 52°32′28″N 7°48′57″W
- Country: Ireland
- Province: Munster
- County: County Tipperary
- Time zone: UTC+0 (WET)
  - Summer (DST): UTC-1 (IST (WEST))

Dualla (Irish: Dumha Aille) is a village in County Tipperary, Ireland. It is located near Cashel on the R691 road. Its modern name derives from the Irish Dumha Aille, meaning 'mound of the cliff'. Dualla National School began educating pupils in May 1861 and officially opened a new school in June 2012.

(There is a local 'Big House' known as Dually and the settlement is marked as Dually on roadmaps. However all local signage refers to the place as Dualla; as do the local council and residents).

== Sport ==
The local GAA team is Boherlahan–Dualla GAA.

== Events ==
The village hosts an annual agricultural event, the Dualla Show, every August. The show attracts thousands of visitors and includes a tractor-pulling contest. Another show held locally is the Dualla Thrashing.

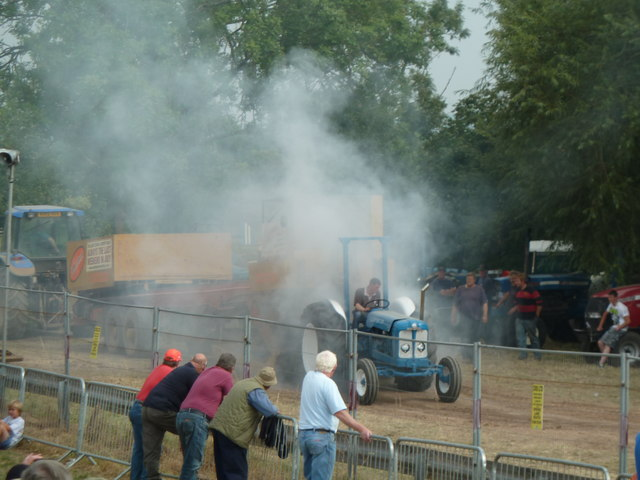
Dualla tractor pulling

== People ==
- Charles Bianconi (1786–1875) died at Longfield House in nearby Boherlahan.

== See also ==
- List of towns and villages in Ireland
