= R481 road (Ireland) =

Road in Ireland

Coordinates: 52.970595°N 9.269064°W

R481 road
- Bóthar R481
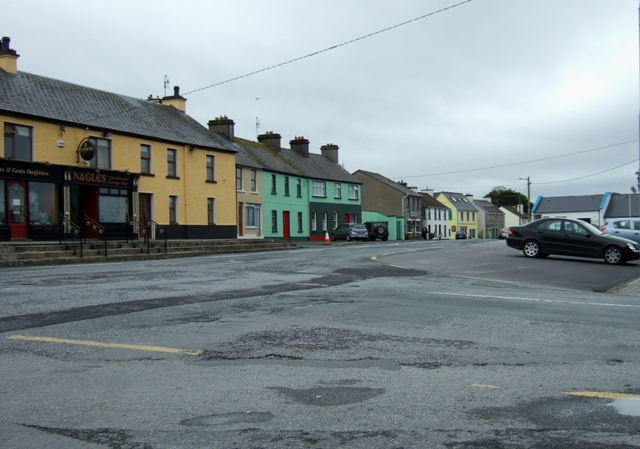
- R481 in Kilfenora

Route information
- Length: 7.0 km (4.3 mi)

Major junctions
- From: R476 Kilfenora
- Crosses Ballydeely River
- To: N67 Calluragh (north of Ennistymon)

Location
- Country: Ireland

Highway system
- Roads in Ireland; Motorways; Primary; Secondary; Regional

The R481 road is a regional road in Ireland, located in County Clare.
