= R695 road (Ireland) =

Road in Ireland

R695 road
- Bóthar R695
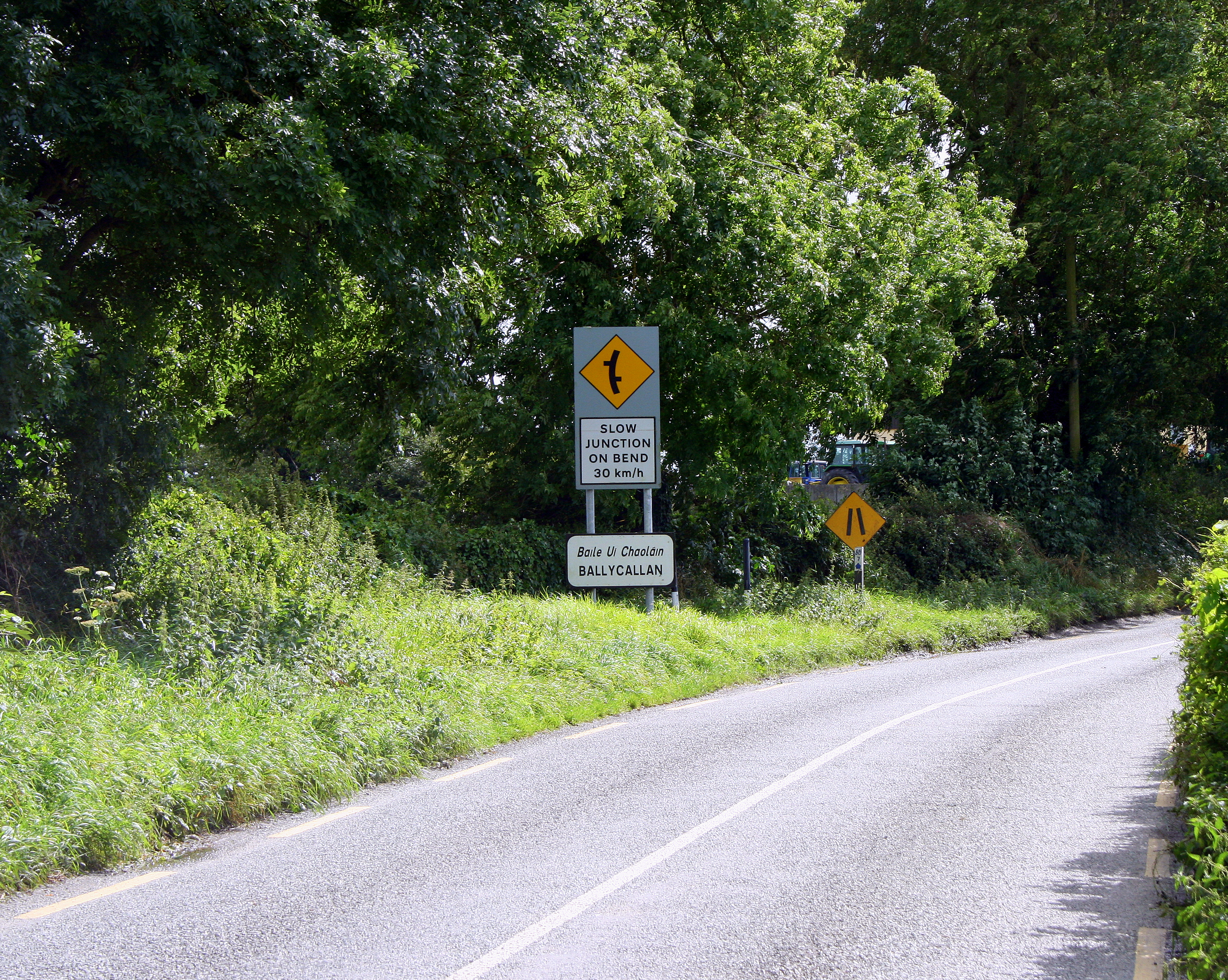
- The R695 approaching Ballycallan

Location
- Country: Ireland
- Primary destinations: County Kilkenny; Callan leave town centre cross the N76; Ballyline R691; Kilmanagh; Ballycallan; Kilkenny City terminates at the R693

Highway system
- Roads in Ireland; Motorways; Primary; Secondary; Regional

The R695 road is a regional road in Ireland which runs west–east from the centre of Callan in County Kilkenny to the R693 near Kilkenny City. The route is 1 km (0.62 mi) long.

== See also ==
- Roads in Ireland
- National primary road
- National secondary road
