= R170 road (Ireland) =

Road in Ireland

R170 road
- Bóthar R170
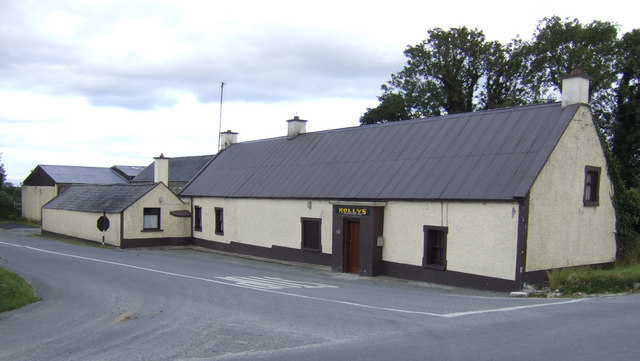
- Molly's Pub in Murray's Cross, at the junction of the R170 and R166 roads

Route information
- Length: 28 km (17 mi)

Location
- Country: Ireland
- Primary destinations: County Louth; leaves the N2 at Ardee; crosses the M1 at Dunleer; Terminates at junction with the R166 at Murray's Cross

Highway system
- Roads in Ireland; Motorways; Primary; Secondary; Regional

The R170 road is a regional road in Ireland linking Ardee and Murray's Cross in County Louth. The road passes through the town of Dunleer and the village of Grangebellew.

The road is 28 km (17 mi) long.

== See also ==
- Roads in Ireland
- National primary road
- National secondary road
