= R349 road (Ireland) =

Road in Ireland

Coordinates: 53.224894°N 8.629571°W

R349 road
- Bóthar R349

Route information
- Length: 11.2 km (7.0 mi)

Major junctions
- From: R348 Tallyho Cross
- To: N66 / R446 Loughrea (Caherlavine Roundabout)

Location
- Country: Ireland

Highway system
- Roads in Ireland; Motorways; Primary; Secondary; Regional

The R349 road, commonly called the Loughrea–Athenry Road, is a regional road in Ireland, located in County Galway.
