= R640 road (Ireland) =

Road in Ireland

Coordinates: 52.378360°N 7.893276°W

R640 road
- Bóthar R640

Route information
- Length: 5.2 km (3.2 mi)

Major junctions
- From: N24 / R639 Cahir (Tipperary Road Roundabout)
- R913 Cahir (Mitchelstown Road); R670 Cahir (The Square); Passes over Limerick–Rosslare railway line
- To: N24 Knockagh Roundabout

Location
- Country: Ireland

Highway system
- Roads in Ireland; Motorways; Primary; Secondary; Regional

The R640 road is a regional road in Ireland, located near Cahir, County Tipperary.
