= Tallanstown =

Village in County Louth, Ireland

Tallanstown Baile an Tallúnaigh (Irish)
- Village
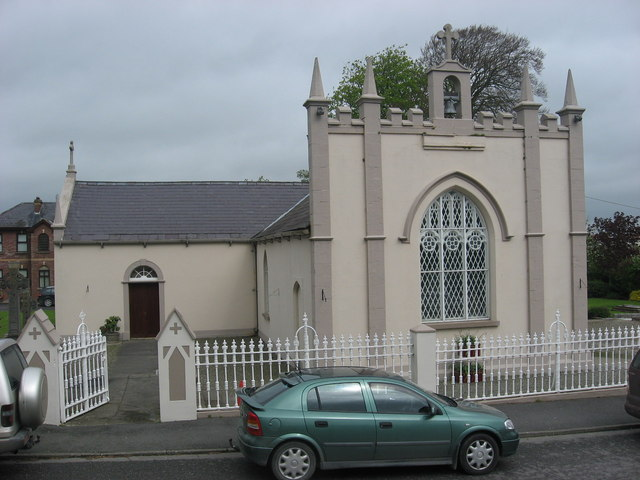
- Tallanstown's 18th-century church was extended and a Gothic frontispiece added c. 1830

- Location in Ireland
- Coordinates: 53°55′11″N 6°32′52″W
- Country: Ireland
- Province: Leinster
- County: County Louth

Government
  - Dáil constituency: Louth
  - EP constituency: Midlands–North-West

Population (2016)
  - Total: 674
- Time zone: UTC+0 (WET)
  - Summer (DST): UTC-1 (IST (WEST))
- Area codes: 042, +353 42

Tallanstown (Irish: Baile an Tallúnaigh) is a village in County Louth, Ireland. It is on the banks of the River Glyde, 13 km southwest of Dundalk. The village is on the R171 road, at the junction with the R166 road. It was the winner of the 2010 Tidy Towns competition. The village is in a townland and civil parish of the same name.

== History ==
Evidence of ancient settlement in the area includes a number of standing stone, enclosure and hut sites in the townlands of Louth Hall and Rathbrist. The Record of Monuments and Places also records the ruins of a motte-and-bailey castle in Louth Hall townland. The eponymous Louth Hall, a ruined three-storey Georgian house, built c. 1760, was built on the site (and incorporating part of) an earlier 14th century tower house.

The Catholic church within Tallanstown, which is dedicated to Saint Peter and Saint Paul and also within Louth Hall townland, was built c. 1780. The nearby national school building, now used as a community hall, was built in 1840.

In September 2025, three members of a local family were killed in a suspected triple murder at their home in Drumgowna townland, to the northwest of Tallanstown.
