= N85 road (Ireland) =

National secondary road connecting Ennis and Ennistymon

Coordinates: 52°51′43″N 9°07′56″W

N85 road
- Bóthar N85

Route information
- Length: 31.858 km (19.796 mi)

Location
- Country: Ireland
- Primary destinations: County Clare; Ennistymon; Inagh; Kilnamona; Ennis

Highway system
- Roads in Ireland; Motorways; Primary; Secondary; Regional

The N85 road is a national secondary road in Ireland connecting Ennis and Ennistymon. The route connects to the M18 Ennis bypass and forms part of the Ennis outer ring road as the "N85 Western Relief Road". From Ennis the route continues in a north - west direction and terminates at the junction with the N67 at Ennistymon. It is located entirely in County Clare.

== See also ==
- Roads in Ireland
- Motorways in Ireland
- National primary road
- Regional road
