= R365 road (Ireland) =

Road in Ireland

Coordinates: 53.483133°N 8.507359°W

R365 road
- Bóthar R365

Route information
- Length: 4.0 km (2.5 mi)

Major junctions
- From: N63 Marlay
- To: N63 Ballynahowna

Location
- Country: Ireland

Highway system
- Roads in Ireland; Motorways; Primary; Secondary; Regional

The R365 road, also called the Mountbellew Bypass, is a regional road in Ireland, located in County Galway.
