= R813 road (Ireland) =

Road in Ireland

R813 road
- Bóthar R813
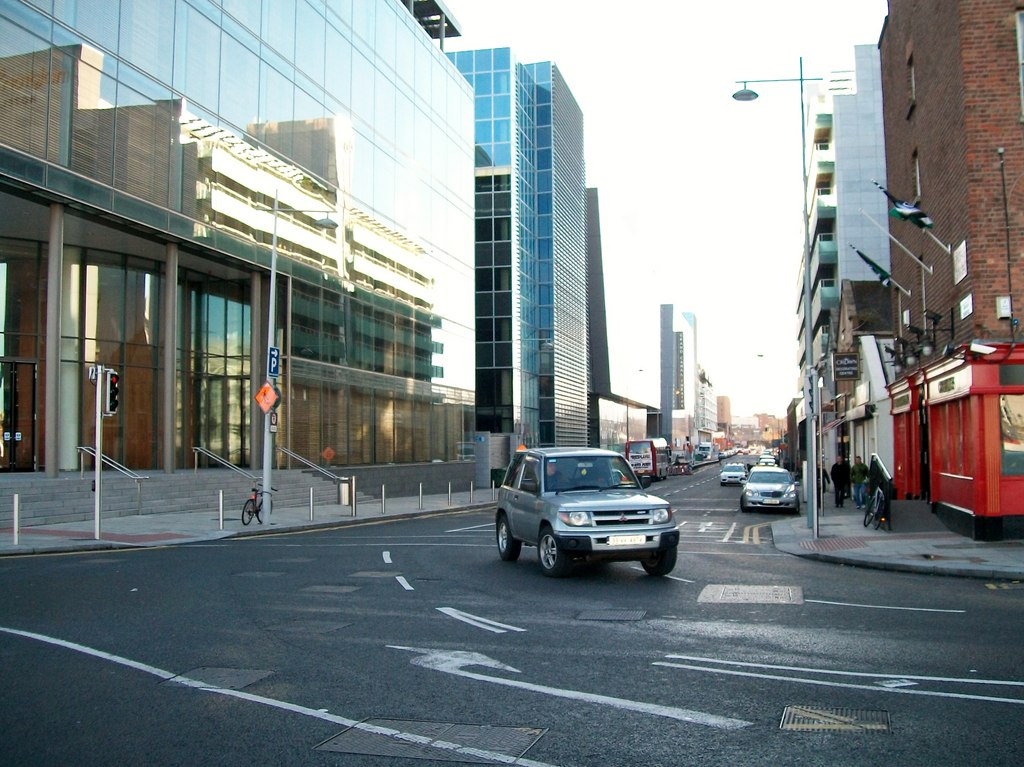
- Cardiff Lane at Sir John Rogerson's Quay, on the R813

Route information
- Length: 1.2 km (0.75 mi)

Location
- Country: Ireland
- Primary destinations: Dublin; R105 (Matt Talbot Memorial Bridge); City Quay; Sir John Rogerson's Quay; Cardiff Lane; Macken Street; R802 (Pearse Street)

Highway system
- Roads in Ireland; Motorways; Primary; Secondary; Regional

The R813 road is a regional road in Dublin, Ireland.

The official definition of the R813 from the Roads Act 1993 (Classification of Regional Roads) Order 2006 states:

R813: City Quay, Dublin

Between its junction with R105 at Matt Talbot Memorial Bridge and its junction with R802 at Pearse Street via City Quay, Sir John Rogerson's Quay, Cardiff Lane and Macken Street all in the city of Dublin.

The road is 1.2 kilometres (0.75 mi) long.

== See also ==
- Roads in Ireland
- Regional road
