= Owenahincha =

Beach in County Cork, Ireland

Coordinates: 51.5666°N 8.999°W

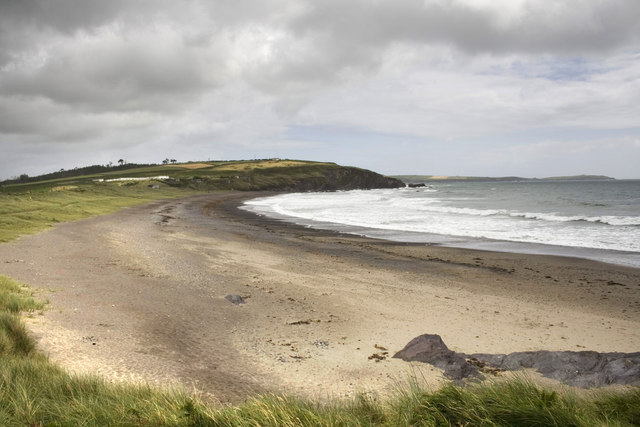
Owenahincha beach

Owenahincha (Irish: Abha na hInse) is a beach located near Rosscarbery in County Cork. It is, as of 2022, a Blue Flag beach. There are a number of camping and caravan parks in the area.
