= Lough Marrave =

Lake in County Leitrim, Ireland

- Loch Marbh (Irish)
- Location in Ireland
- Location: County Leitrim
- Coordinates: 54°02′N 7°56′W
- Lake type: Freshwater
- Primary inflows: Shannon–Erne Waterway
- Primary outflows: Shannon–Erne Waterway
- Basin countries: Ireland
- Surface area: 0.1 km^{2} (0.039 sq mi) est.
- Max. depth: 4 m (13 ft) est.
- Surface elevation: 62 m (203 ft) est.

Lough Marrave (Irish: Loch Marbh, meaning 'dead lake') is a small freshwater lake in County Leitrim in the northwest of Ireland.

== Etymology ==
(Irish: Loch Marbh) translates to "the dead lake, or lake of death". It is plausible Lough Marrave served a pagan sacrificial purpose, and the Keshcarrigan Bowl was deposited there as a ritual offering. There is a reference in the "Book of Fenagh" to an unidentified and "Irish: Inbher, meaning 'cursed estuary, pool, or lake'" on the "road to Fenagh", with a marginal note attributed to Tadhg O'Roddy (fl. 1700) adding: "no fish was afterwards caught in it; for they (the fishes) cannot even live in that lake". Nevertheless, the origin of the "Dead lake" etymology remains speculative and unknown.

== Geography ==
Lough Marrave lies 1 kilometre (0.6 mi) north east of Keshcarrigan village, and 500 metres (1,640.4 ft) east of Lough Scur. The lake is very small and shallow, covering a surface-area of about 0.1 square kilometres (0.0 sq mi), and might be considered a continuation of Lough Scur, as they share the same level and connected by a half-mile channel. Lough Marrave is connected to St. John's Lough and Lough Scur by the Shannon–Erne Waterway.

== Ecology ==
The presence and type of fish found in Lough Marrave is not recorded. The ecology of County Leitrim waterways, such as Lough Marrave, is threatened by zebra mussel and other invasive species.

== Human settlement ==
The primary human settlements at Lough Marrave are Keshcarrigan and Fenagh villages. Lough Marrave is bounded by the townlands of Gubroe to the south and east, Killmacsherwell to the north, and Rossy to the west.

== Heritage ==
The Keshcarrigan Bowl was discovered in the canal between Lough Scur and Lough Marrave in the 19th century, c. 1843 – c. 1852, and is today preserved at the National Museum of Ireland.

== See also ==
- List of loughs in Ireland
- Keshcarrigan
- Castlefore Lough
- Keshcarrigan Lough

== References and notes ==
=== Primary references ===
- MacMahon, John (1845). Correspondance relative to the navigation between Lough Erne and the River Shannon (Report). Vol. Parliamentary Papers, House of Commons and Command, Volume 45 (Digitized 2006 from original in Harvard University ed.). H.M. Stationery Office.
- logainm.ie. "Loch Marbh/Lough Marrave".
- Haug, Per Ivar (2013). Gazetteer of Ireland. Vol. Til Opplysning, A series of papers from the University Library in Trondheim, Nummer 16 (Third ed.). Hommelvik: UBiT, Universitetsbiblioteket i Trondheim.

=== Secondary references ===
- Ó Donnabháin, Sean (1828). Book of Fenagh, Translation and Copious Notes (PDF). Fenagh, Leitrim, Ireland: Maolmhordha Mac Dubhghoill Uí Raghailligh.
- Pedreschi, D.; Kelly-Quinn, M.; Caffrey, J; O'Grady, M.; Mariani, S.; Phillimore, A. (2014), "Genetic structure of pike (Esox lucius) reveals a complex and previously unrecognized colonization history of Ireland", Journal of Biogeography, 41 (3), Journal of Biogeography, 41(3), 548–560.: 548–560, doi:10.1111/jbi.12220, PMC 4238397, PMID 25435649, S2CID 13486116
- Mulvany, W. T.; Fraser, William; Roberts, Samuel; Mulvany, Thomas J.; O'Flaherty, John (1852). Appendix No. V: Notices of Antiquities Presented to the Royal Irish Academy by W. T. Mulvany, Esq., M. R. I. A., on the Part of the Commissioners of Public Works. Proceedings of the Royal Irish Academy (Report). Vol. 5 (1850 - 1853). Royal Irish Academy. pp. xxxi–lxvi. JSTOR 20489812.
