= Drumaleague Lough =

Lake in County Leitrim, Ireland

- Droim Dhá Liag Loch (Irish)
- Location in Ireland
- Coordinates: 54°0′59″N 7°59′7″W
- Lake type: Freshwater
- Primary inflows: Shannon–Erne Waterway
- Primary outflows: Shannon–Erne Waterway
- Basin countries: Ireland
- Surface area: 0.05 km^{2} (0.019 sq mi) est.
- Max. depth: 6 m (20 ft) est.

Drumaleague Lough (Irish: Droim Dhá Liag Loch, meaning 'lake of the ridge of the two stones') is a very small freshwater lake in County Leitrim, Ireland. The ecology of Drumaleague Lough, and other county waterways, remains threatened by zebra mussel and other invasive species.

== Etymology ==
The origin of the lake name is unknown, but (Irish: Droim Dhá Liag Loch) means the "Lake of the Ridge of two Stones, or Pillar-Stones".

== Geography ==
Drumaleague Lough lies 1 kilometre (0.6 mi) south of both Drumcong village and Carrickaport Lough, and 1 kilometre (0.6 mi) southwest of Lough Scur. This elliptical shaped lake is very small, covering a surface-area of about 0.05 square kilometres (0.0 sq mi), measuring 300 metres (984.3 ft) in length from west to east, and 170 metres (557.7 ft) north to south, with depths of up to 6 metres (19.7 ft) and a very soft mud bottom. Drumaleague Lough is connected to Lough Conway to the west, and Lough Scur to the east by the Shannon–Erne Waterway.

== Ecology ==
The presence, and type, of fish found in Drumaleague Lough is not recorded.

== Human settlement ==
The primary human settlement near Drumaleague Lough is Drumcong village. The lake is bounded by the townlands of Letterfine to the north and east, Drumaleague to the west, and Seltan (McDonald) to the south and east.

== Heritage ==
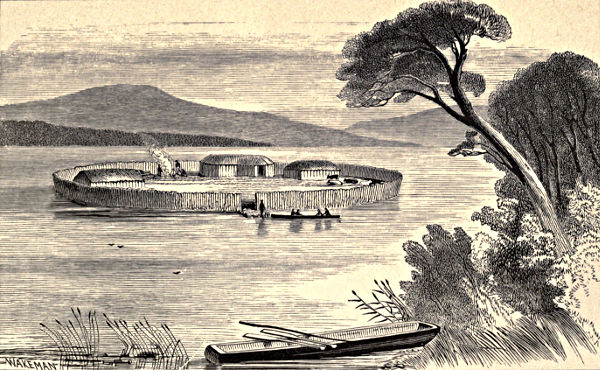
Illustration of (crannog)

=== Ancient lake dwellers ===
Two ancient crannogs existed at Drumaleague Lough during the Middle Ages at least. The crannogs were discovered during the 19th century, c. 1843 – c. 1852.

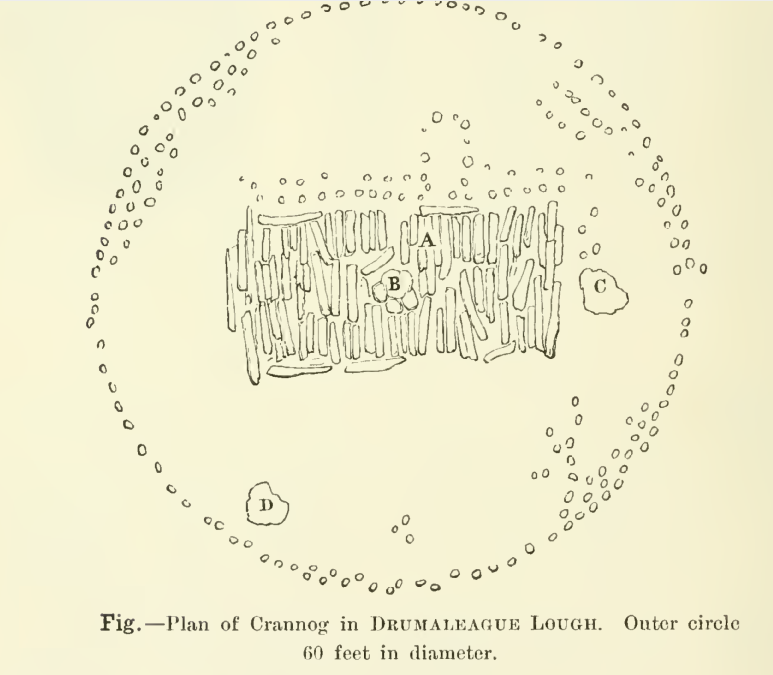
Illustrated plan of Drumaleague Crannog one.

Drumaleague crannog number one a good example of lacustrine dwelling, and with the exception of the hearth-stones, was composed entirely of wood, mainly Alder. The annexed plan conveys a good example of the general arrangement of a crannog, with an outer line of stakes enclosing a circle 18.3 metres (60.0 ft) in diameter. Stakes driven into the ground were positioned in a single row in some parts of the island, and in double or treble rows, or clusters, in other parts, seemingly for purposes related to some internal arrangement. Because the foundation is very soft, the layers of timber are very deep. A, the central oblong portion, consists of a platform of round logs cut in lengths of 1.2m to 1.8m, possibly the floor of the hut; B, a collection of stones with marks of fire on them; C, a heap of stiff clay; D, the root of a large tree nearly buried in the peat, the surface of the wood bevelled off, so as to form a sort of table, under which was found a considerable quantity of bones, apparently those of deer and swine.

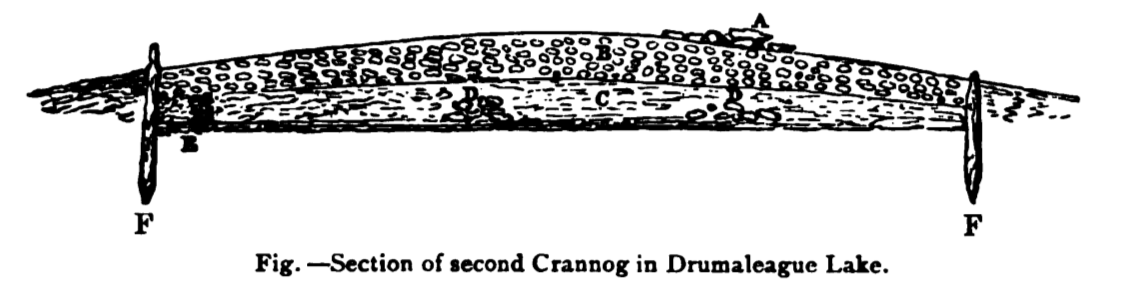
Illustrated section of Drumaleague Crannog two.

Drumaleague crannog number two measured 6.7 metres (22.0 ft) in diameter. The annexed section conveys a good example of the flooring of an oblong house for this type of crannog, surrounded by a regular circular enclosure formed of a single row of oak stakes F, F; and being 22 metres (72.2 ft) in diameter. The upper stratum B, consisted of horizontal logs of alder, reposing upon a black peaty surface; the logs were c. 7cm – c. 20cm in diameter, completely water soaked and rotten: this stratum of timber was 1 metre (3 ft 3.4 in) deep. A, a heap of stones with marks of fire on them, and two other hearths were found in different parts of the island. G, the lower stratum of decayed and blackened sticks and branches of all descriptions lying in every direction : this layer extended as far as it was pierced in the examination, viz., about 1.2 cm, but was evidently of greater depth. D, D, two heaps of stones found in the lower stratum. E, the kitchen midden, in which was a large quantity of bones of deer, swine, oxen, &c., that lay 1.2 cm below the surface.

=== Canoe ===
An ancient canoe created from a single trunk of oak, 5.5m long, 55 cm broad, not formed for speed being square at stem and stern, and having apertures or rowlocks cut in the side, was found embedded in the mud on the shore opposite one of the islands, and about as deep below the level of the surface of the lake as the island itself. The canoe was in tolerable preservation when found, but fell to pieces after being some time exposed to the air. (Note: Wilde (1861) complained of the poor preservation of dugout boat discoveries, noting many had been broken up for firewood since their recovery.) The recording of large numbers of ancient dug-out canoes found in County Leitrim remind us that waterways also provided a key means of transport both before and since the Middle Ages.

=== Museum artifacts ===
The following archaeological artefacts were discovered at Drumaleague Lough in the 19th century, c. 1843 – c. 1852, and probably preserved at the Royal Irish Academy museum, or at the National Museum of Ireland-

- The thin topstone of a quern, formed of micaceous quartzite, smooth upon the grinding surface, but otherwise rude and unfinished was found on Drumaleague crannog number two: the hole for the handle passes quite through, and the grain-hole, 6.4 cm in diameter, is not directly in the centre.
- One cask of bones found on the Drumaleague crannog number two.
- A portion of a door-frame, with mortices and cheeks cut into it, from one of the crannogs.

== See also ==
- List of loughs in Ireland
- Lough Conway
- Carrickaport Lough

== References and notes ==
=== Primary references ===
- MacMahon, John (1845). Correspondence relative to the navigation between Lough Erne and the River Shannon (Report). Vol. Parliamentary Papers, House of Commons and Command, Volume 45 (Digitized 2006 from original in Harvard University ed.). H.M. Stationery Office.
- logainm.ie. "Droim Dhá Liag Loch/Drumaleague Lough".

=== Secondary references ===
- Wood-Martin, W. G. (William Gregory) (1886). The lake dwellings of Ireland: or, Ancient lacustrine habitations of Erin, commonly called crannogs (PDF). Dublin : Hodges, Figgis & co.; [etc., etc.]
- Munro, Robert (1890). The lake-dwellings of Europe: being the Rhind lectures in archaeology for 1888 (PDF). London [etc.]: Cassell & company, limited.
- Pedreschi, D.; Kelly-Quinn, M.; Caffrey, J; O'Grady, M.; Mariani, S.; Phillimore, A. (2014), "Genetic structure of pike (Esox lucius) reveals a complex and previously unrecognized colonization history of Ireland", Journal of Biogeography, 41 (3), Journal of Biogeography, 41(3), 548–560.: 548–560, doi:10.1111/jbi.12220, PMC 4238397, PMID 25435649
- Mulvany, W. T.; Fraser, William; Roberts, Samuel; Mulvany, Thomas J.; O'Flaherty, John (1852). Appendix No. V: Notices of Antiquities Presented to the Royal Irish Academy by W. T. Mulvany, Esq., M. R. I. A., on the Part of the Commissioners of Public Works. Proceedings of the Royal Irish Academy (Report). Vol. 5 (1850 - 1853). Royal Irish Academy. pp. xxxi–lxvi. JSTOR 20489812.
- O'Sullivan, Aidan (2004). The social and Ideological role of Crannogs in Early Medieval Ireland (PDF) (Thesis) (PhD. Thesis ed.). Department of Modern History, National University of Ireland, Manooth.
- O'Drisceoil, C; Leenane, M; Davis, S; Fitzgibbon, B; Teehan, M (2014). THE BLACK PIG'S DYKE REGIONAL PROJECT REPORT (PDF) (Report). Vol. 1 of 2. Archived from the original (PDF) on 18 February 2017.
