= Lough Conway =

Lake in County Leitrim, Ireland

- Loch Conbhuí (Irish)
- Location in Ireland
- Location: County Leitrim
- Coordinates: 54°2′25″N 7°53′2″W
- Lake type: Freshwater
- Primary inflows: Shannon–Erne Waterway
- Primary outflows: Shannon–Erne Waterway
- Basin countries: Ireland
- Surface area: 0.05 km^{2} (0.019 sq mi) est.
- Max. depth: 6 m (20 ft) est.

Lough Conway (Irish: Loch Conbhuí, meaning 'Conway’s Lake') is a very small freshwater lake in northwest Ireland.

== Etymology ==
The origin of the lake name is unknown, but (Irish: Loch Conbhuí) has the meaning "Conway’s Lake".

== Geography ==
Lough Conway is located in Kiltubbrid parish in the county Leitrim. It connects with Drumaleague Lough by a 0.8 kilometres (0.5 mi) navigable stretch of the Shannon–Erne Waterway. This elliptical shaped very lake is small, covering a surface-area of about 0.06 square kilometres (0.0 sq mi) and measures 350 metres (1,148.3 ft) from the north-east to south-west shore, with 140 metres (459.3 ft) wide.

== Ecology ==
Fish present in Lough Conway include Pike. The pike population is the "native Irish strain" (Irish: liús meaning 'Irish Pike') not the other European Pike strain (Irish: gailliasc meaning 'strange or foreign fish'). The ecology of Lough Conway, and other county Leitrim waterways, are threatened by zebra mussel and other invasive species.

== History ==
=== Corn mill ===
From at least the 18th century a sluice was used to reserve a water supply from Lough Conway for the nearby Corn Mill situated on Kilclaremore townland. This corn mill was "very useful to the inhabitants of the district", so c. 1845 – c. 1853 the branch drain between "Ulster Canal" and Lough Conway was improved. The corn mill closed in the 20th century.

== Human settlement ==
The primary human settlements near Lough Conway are the surrounding townlands of Kilclaremore and Drumruekill to the west, Loughconway to the north, and Kilclaremore on the south.

== See also ==
- List of loughs in Ireland
- Drumaleague Lough
- Carrickaport Lough

== References and notes ==
=== Primary references ===
- MacMahon, John (1845). Correspondance relative to the navigation between Lough Erne and the River Shannon (Report). Vol. Parliamentary Papers, House of Commons and Command, Volume 45 (Digitized 2006 from original in Harvard University ed.). H.M. Stationery Office.
- logainm.ie. "Loch Conbhuí/Lough Conway".

=== Secondary references ===
==== Miscellaneous ====
- Pedreschi, D.; Kelly-Quinn, M.; Caffrey, J; O'Grady, M.; Mariani, S.; Phillimore, A. (2014), "Genetic structure of pike (Esox lucius) reveals a complex and previously unrecognized colonization history of Ireland", Journal of Biogeography, 41 (3), Journal of Biogeography, 41(3), 548–560.: 548–560, doi:10.1111/jbi.12220, PMC 4238397, PMID 25435649, S2CID 13486116
- townlands.ie. "Loughconway Townland, Co. Leitrim".
- Ireland Board of Public Works (1853). Twenty First Report (Report). Vol. Public Works Ireland. Alexander Thom.

==== Folklore ====
- Seán Ó Céilleachair, ed. (1937). "Flummery" (Online ed.). Corderay School, Shancurry, Co. Leitrim: Duchas. pp. 217–218.
