= R210 road (Ireland) =

Road in Ireland

R210 road
- Bóthar R210

Route information
- Length: 1.9 km (1.2 mi)

Major junctions
- From: R209 at Drumaleague, County Leitrim
- To: R208 at Drumcong

Location
- Country: Ireland

Highway system
- Roads in Ireland; Motorways; Primary; Secondary; Regional

The R210 road is a regional road in Ireland linking the R209 and R208 roads in south county Leitrim. Approximately 1.9 km (1.2 mi) in length, the R210 road runs along the south-east border of Carrickaport Lough and also runs along the north-west border of Lough Scur over Drumcong townland, the placename in Irish: Droim Conga translating to "Ridge of the narrow neck".

== See also ==
- Roads in Ireland
