= Knockadoois =

Townland in County Fermanagh, Northern Ireland

Knockadoois is a townland in the Civil Parish of Tomregan, Barony of Knockninny, County Fermanagh, Northern Ireland.

== Etymology ==
The townland name is an anglicisation of a Gaelic placename, either "Cnoc a Duais" which means 'Hill of the Reward', or "Cnoc Dubhais" meaning 'The Black Peak'.

== Geography ==
It is bounded on the north & west by Gortineddan townland, on the east by Carickaleese townland and on the south by the international border with County Cavan and the Republic of Ireland. Its chief geographical features are the Shannon-Erne Waterway, spring wells and a drumlin hill reaching to 50 metres above sea-level. The townland is traversed by Cloncoohy Lane. Knockadoois covers an area of 155 statute acres.

== History ==
The townland formed part of the ballybethagh of Calvagh in medieval times. As it was a border townland the ownership was contested between the McGovern and Maguire clans. At the time of the 1609 Ulster Plantation the townland was overlooked and does not appear on the Plantation Baronial maps. The map for Knockninny barony stops on the east bank of the stream entering the Woodford river between the townlands of Derryhooly and Corry townlands, while the Tullyhaw barony map stops where the Irish border is now, thus omitting that part of Tomregan parish which lies in County Fermanagh. The mapping of Fermanagh and Cavan only took about 10 days each, which was insufficient time to make a proper survey. A different surveyor was sent into each barony to draw up his own map so the error probably arose because the surveyor who drew the Knockninny map assumed the omitted townlands were in County Cavan and the Tullyhaw surveyor who was probably a different man then assumed the lands were in County Fermanagh. The confusion continued for a few years. Firstly a grant was made to Thomas Monepeny on 15 October 1610 of the Manor of Aghalane, which included one tate of Knoc. On 31 July 1613, Thomas Monepeny sold the Manor of Aghalane to Thomas Creighton. Thomas Creighton then died in 1618, and his widow Katherine married George Adwick. The estate descended to Thomas Creighton's son, David Creighton. He was a minor at his father's death so his mother and George Adwick administered the estate on his behalf. An Inquisition held at Castlecoote on 5 November 1629 stated that David Creighton owned, inter alia, the lands of Knock. However, there seems to have been some dispute with Sir Stephen Butler, who owned the adjoining manor, as an Inquisition held at Netownbutler on 20 January 1630 stated that Sir Stephen Butler owned, inter alia, the lands of Knocke alias Mc.Nock. An Inquisition held in Newtownbutler on 23 March 1639 found that the said James Balfour owned, inter alia, the lands of Nacknocke. A grant dated 8 December 1675 to Charles Balfour of Castle Balfour, included, inter alia, the lands of Knocknocks. A lease dated 28 July 1721 from William Balfour to Hugh Henry includes, inter alia, the lands of Nacknock.

In the 1750s no residents were entitled to vote in the townland.

The Tithe Applotment Books for 1827 (which spell it as Knox or Knockadooes) list the following tithepayers in the townland- Foster, Kells, Hayes, Drum, Ross, Powel, Murphy, Brady, Elliott.

The Knockadoois Valuation Office Field books are available for May 1836.

Griffith's Valuation of 1857 lists nineteen occupiers in the townland. The landlord of Knockadoois in the 1850s was the Enery estate, the proprietors of Ballyconnell Castle.

== Census ==
Year	Population	Males	Females	Total Houses	Uninhabited
1841	96	46	50	17	1
1851	85	39	46	14	0
1861	69	37	32	12	0
1871	57	29	28	10	0
1881	43	22	21	10	0
1891	45	19	26	10	0

In the 1901 census of Ireland, there are ten families listed in the townland.

In the 1911 census of Ireland, there are thirteen families listed in the townland.

== Antiquities ==
The only historic site in the townland is Knockadoois Springs House.
