= R202 road (Ireland) =

Road in Ireland

R202 road
- Bóthar R202
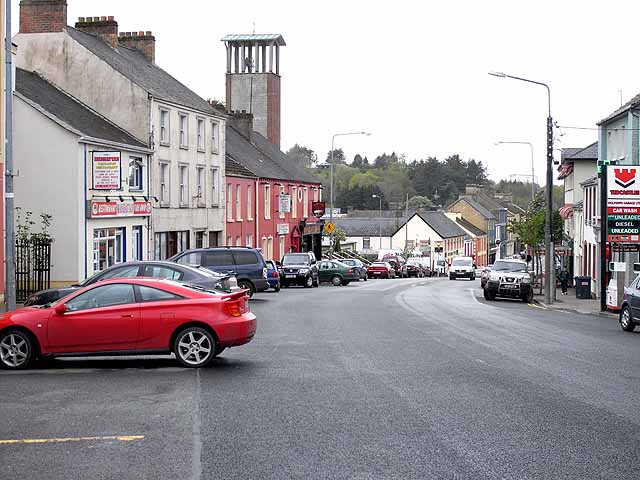
- Main Street, Ballinamore, on the R202

Route information
- Length: 40.0 km (24.9 mi)

Location
- Country: Ireland
- Primary destinations: County Leitrim; Starts in Dromod; Crosses the N4 Dromod bypass at a roundabout junction; Cloonboniagh lake; Mohill - (R201); Keshcarrigan; Garvagh; Fenagh - (R209); (R208); Ballinamore - (R199), (R204); County Cavan; (R200); Terminates at the N87 5 km (3.1 mi) south of Swanlinbar

Highway system
- Roads in Ireland; Motorways; Primary; Secondary; Regional

The R202 road is a regional road in Ireland linking Dromod in County Leitrim to Swanlinbar in County Cavan. En route it passes through Mohill and Ballinamore.

== Connections ==
The R202 road links with the N87 in Swanlinbar and then runs to the border of Northern Ireland becoming the A32 that runs into Enniskillen. At the other end it links with the N4 in Dromod. There are also connections in Dromod with the Dublin-Sligo railway line two-hourly frequency train service to Sligo from Dublin Connolly. The road is 40 km (25 mi) long.

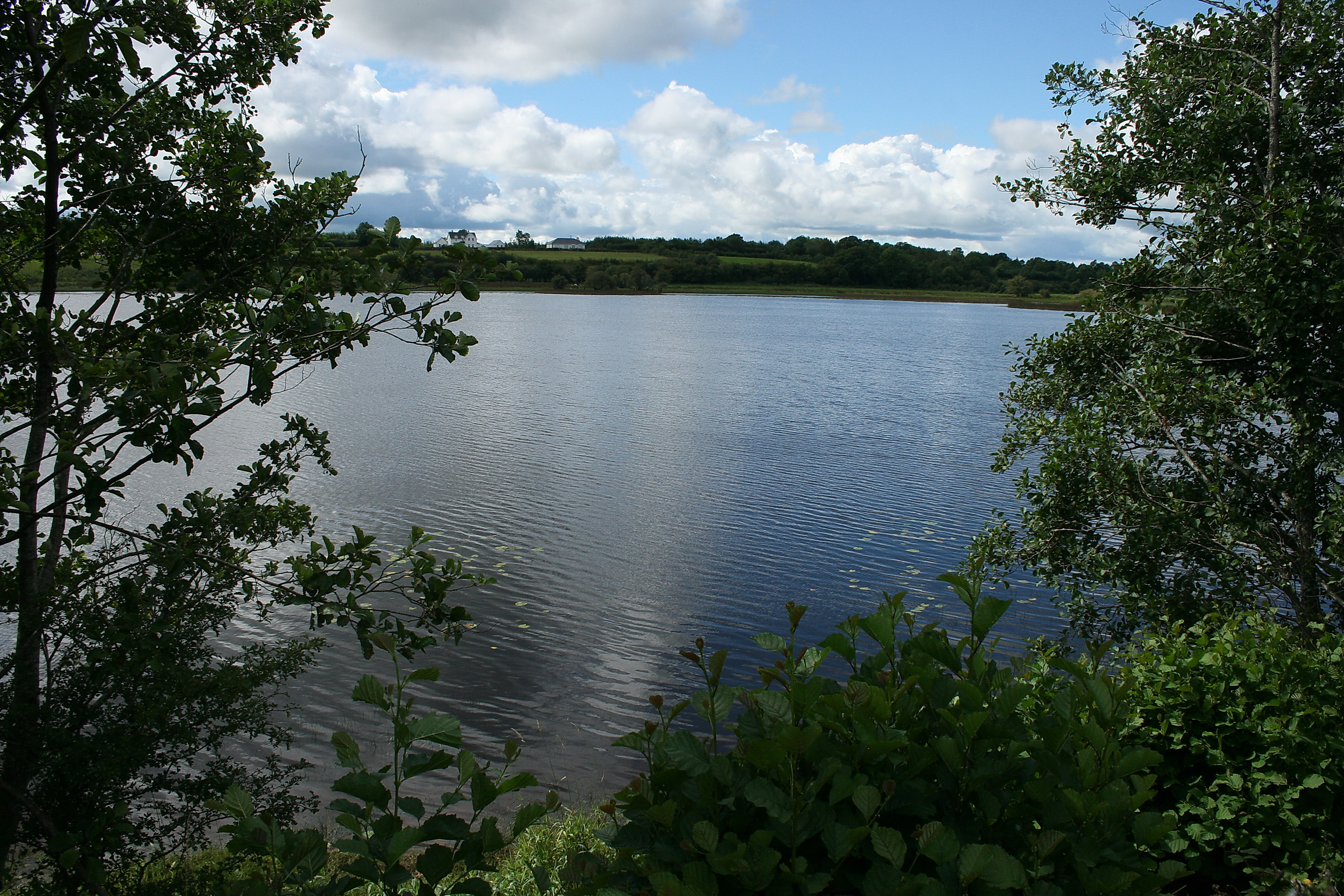
The R202 borders Cloonboniagh lake in Leitrim

== See also ==
- Roads in Ireland
- National primary road
- National secondary road
