= R208 road (Ireland) =

Road in Ireland

R208 road
- Bóthar R208
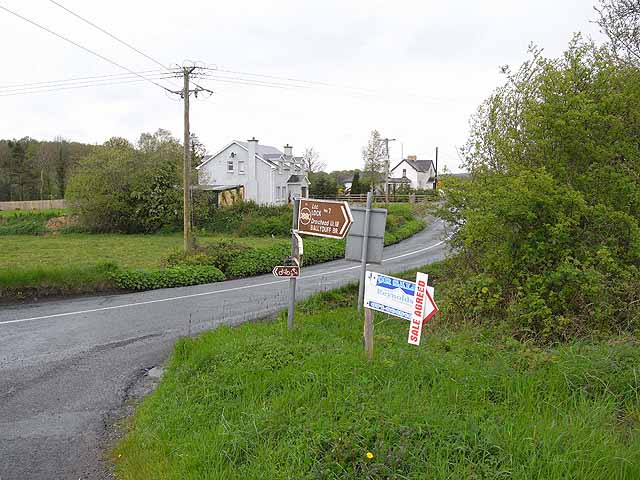
- R208 at Tomloskan, County Leitrim

Route information
- Length: 18.9 km (11.7 mi)

Major junctions
- From: R280 at Mahanagh, County Leitrim
- Cross Lough Allen Canal; R207 at Main Street, Drumshanbo; R210 at Drumcong; Cross Shannon–Erne Waterway
- To: R202 at Killaneen

Location
- Country: Ireland

Highway system
- Roads in Ireland; Motorways; Primary; Secondary; Regional

The R208 road is a regional road in Ireland linking the R280 and R202 roads in County Leitrim.

From the R280, the road goes east to Drumshanbo, crossing the Lough Allen Canal as it leaves Lough Allen. From Drumshanbo, the road passes Lough Scur and St. John's Lough, crossing the Ballinamore canal at Ballyduff Bridge in Tomloskan townland, before ending at the R202. The R208 is 18.9 kilometres (11.7 mi) long eastbound, shorter westbound.

== See also ==
- Roads in Ireland
