= Carickaleese =

Townland in County Fermanagh, Northern Ireland

Carickaleese is a townland in the Civil Parish of Tomregan, Barony of Knockninny, County Fermanagh, Northern Ireland.

== Etymology ==
The townland name is an Anglicization of either the Irish "Carraig a Lios" which means ‘The Rock of the Fort’ or "Carraig Giolla Íosa" which means 'Gilleece's Rock' (the surname Gilleece being still common in the area). The oldest surviving mention of the name is in a grant dated 15 October 1610 where it is spelled ‘Corgelouse’. Spellings in later documents are- Cerglles 1612; Corgelouse 1629; Corgetesse alias Corgeluse 1630; Corrogabees 1659 and Garteegeeleese 1675. Ambrose Leet's 1814 Directory spells the name as Carrickalease. A subdivision of the townland is named "Curraghart" which is an anglicisation of the Gaelic placename "Currech Airt" which means ‘Art’s Marsh’.

== Geography ==
It is bounded on the north by Gortineddan townland, on the east by Kiltycrose and Dernagore townlands, on the south by Cloncoohy townland & on the west by Knockadoois townland. Its chief geographical features are the Shannon-Erne Waterway, the Duvoge River, Cloncoohy Lough and a drumlin hill reaching to 60 metres above sea-level. The townland is traversed by Cloncoohy Lane and some minor lanes. Carickaleese covers an area of 203 statute acres.

== History ==
The townland formed part of the ballybethagh of Calvagh in medieval times. As it was a border townland the ownership was contested between the McGovern and Maguire clans. At the time of the 1609 Ulster Plantation the townland was overlooked and does not appear on the Plantation Baronial maps. The map for Knockninny barony stops on the east bank of the stream entering the Woodford river between the townlands of Derryhooly and Corry townlands, while the Tullyhaw barony map stops where the Irish border is now, thus omitting that part of Tomregan parish which lies in County Fermanagh. The mapping of Fermanagh and Cavan only took about 10 days each, which was insufficient time to make a proper survey. A different surveyor was sent into each barony to draw up his own map so the error probably arose because the surveyor who drew the Knockninny map assumed the omitted townlands were in County Cavan and the Tullyhaw surveyor who was probably a different man then assumed the lands were in County Fermanagh. The confusion continued for a few years. Firstly a grant was made to Thomas Monepeny on 15 October 1610 of the Manor of Aghalane, which included one tate of Corgelouse. Taking advantage of this, Lady Margaret O’Neill, the widow of Hugh Maguire (Lord of Fermanagh) claimed the land. An order of the Lord Deputy dated 14 October 1612 states- Wheras The Lady Margrett ny Neale, wyddowe, late wyfe to Sir Hugh Maguyre knight deceased, hath discovered the parcells of land beinge eight tates, and doe lye betweene Knockneny in the County of Fermanagh and Tollagh in the County of Cavan and not within anie Undertakers portion who have since enjoyed the same as it hath been certified by the Surveyors ... we enact that the said Lady Margrett shall receive the next Hallowtyde rent due out of the said eight tates and thence forth until his Majesty decides otherwise. The eight tates included one tate of Cerglles Natowicke and Portnicke. Lady Margaret then seems to have left the scene because, on 31 July 1613, Thomas Monepeny sold the Manor of Aghalane to Thomas Creighton. Thomas Creighton then died in 1618, and his widow Katherine married George Adwick. The estate descended to Thomas Creighton's son, David Creighton. He was a minor at his father's death so his mother and George Adwick administered the estate on his behalf. An Inquisition held at Castlecoote on 5 November 1629 stated that David Creighton owned, inter alia, the lands of Corgelouse. However there seems to have been some dispute with Sir Stephen Butler, who owned the adjoining manor, as an Inquisition held at Netownbutler on 20 January 1630 stated that Sir Stephen Butler owned, inter alia, the lands of Corgetesse alias Corgeluse. Pender's Census of 1659 spells the name as Corrogabees and states there were 5 people over the age of 15 living in the townland, all Irish, (In general the percentage of the Irish population aged under 15 runs at about 20% so the total population of the townland in 1659 would have been roughly about 6). A grant dated 8 December 1675 to Charles Balfour of Castle Balfour, included, inter alia, the lands of Garteegeeleese. A lease dated 28 July 1721 from William Balfour to Hugh Henry includes, inter alia, the lands of Carrigg alias Carglouse.

In July 1751 no residents were entitled to vote in the townland.

The Tithe Applotment Books for 1827 (which spells it as Carrigalise) list the following tithepayers in the townland- Curry, Reilly, McCaffrey, Clerk, McKenna.

The Carickaleese Valuation Office Field books are available for May 1836.

The Irish Famine had an impact on the district. A letter from Rector John Frith of Tomregan parish dated 5 December 1846 to the Office of Public Works, stated there were 130 destitute people in the Fermanagh part of Tomregan. As a result additional works were ordered including £100 towards repairing 136 perches of bridle road from Clincoohy to the main road leading to Ballyconnell, also 96 perches of new line across Carrickaleese bog & 80 perches of bridle road.

Griffith's Valuation of 1857 lists thirty-three occupiers in the townland. The landlord of Carickaleese in the 1850s was the Enery estate, the proprietors of Ballyconnell Castle.

== Census ==
Year	Population	Males	Females	Total Houses	Uninhabited
1841	100	47	53	18	1
1851	86	36	50	16	0
1861	70	25	45	16	1
1871	57	23	34	13	0
1881	53	22	31	13	0
1891	52	22	30	12	2

In the 1901 census of Ireland, there are nine families listed in the townland.

In the 1911 census of Ireland, there are eight families listed in the townland.

== Antiquities ==
1. Cloncoohy Bridge.
2. Carickaleese AOH banner, Fermanagh County Museum.
