= Castlefore Lough =

Lake in County Leitrim, Ireland

- Loch Bhaile Choille Fóir (Irish)
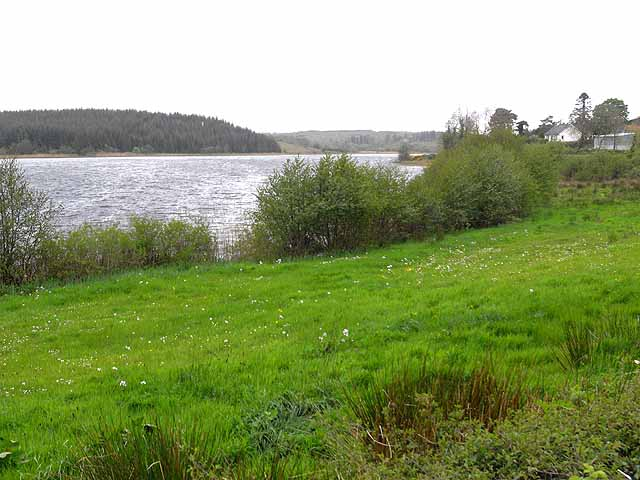

- Location in Ireland
- Location: County Leitrim
- Coordinates: 54°01′23″N 7°54′42″W
- Lake type: Freshwater
- Primary inflows: Shannon–Erne Waterway
- Primary outflows: Shannon–Erne Waterway
- Basin countries: Ireland
- Surface area: 0.3 km^{2} (0.12 sq mi)
- Max. depth: 6 m (20 ft)
- Surface elevation: 66 m (217 ft)
- Islands: 1

Castlefore Lough (Irish: Loch Bhaile Choille Fóir, meaning 'lake of the townland, or homestead, of the wood') is a mesotrophic freshwater lake in County Leitrim, Ireland. Known for good coarse fishing, the lake has limited bank fishing. The ecology of Castlefore Lough, and other county waterways, is threatened by curly waterweed, zebra mussel, and freshwater clam invasive species.

== Etymology ==
The lake takes its name from the district of Castlefore (Irish: Baile Choille Fóir), meaning the 'lake of the townland, or homestead, of the wood'.

== Geography ==
Castlefore Lough lies 3 kilometres (1.9 mi) due east of Keshcarrigan village, and 4 kilometres (2.5 mi) due west of Fenagh in south County Leitrim. The lake has a tilted cone shape, a surface-area of 0.3 square kilometres (0.1 sq mi) and depths to 6 metres (19.7 ft).

== Ecology ==
Fish present in Castlefore Lough include "roach-bream hybrids", roach, perch, bream, tench, and pike. The pike population is the "native Irish strain" (Irish: liús meaning 'Irish pike') not the other European pike strain (Irish: gailliasc meaning 'strange or foreign fish'). The lake has stocks of pike up to 8 pounds (3.6 kg).

== Human settlement ==
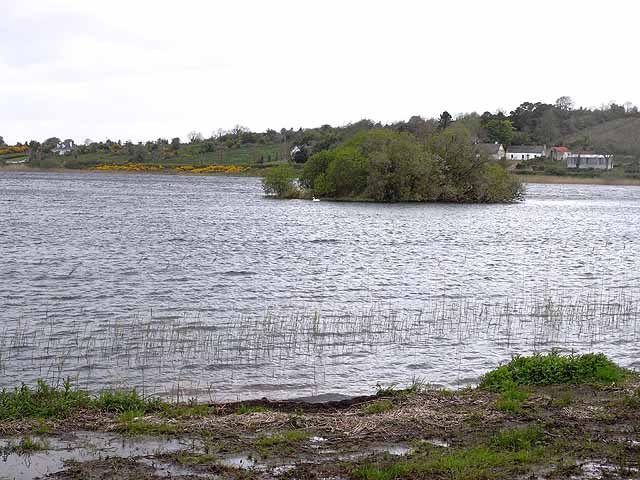
Crannog at eastern end

From Prehistoric Ireland times, lake dwellers settled on a crannog at the eastern end of Castlefore Lough, with possibly two crannogs existing here. The human settlements near Castlefore lough are Keshcarrigan and Fenagh villages, and the townlands of Gubroe to the northwest, Killmacsherwell to the north, Annaghaderg to the south, and Leamanish to the southeast.

== Poem ==
An old published poem titled "An Exile's Dream", praises the scenery around Castlefore Lough.

"I sat down to rest and fell into a slumber,
I thought I was back near my own native place,
And roaming along by the bright crystal waters.
The lovely blue waters of Castlefore Lake.

I stood for a while to admire its beauty
And turned my eyes to that sweet little space.
The Island far out where wild birds go a-nesting
On the lovely blue waters of Castlefore Lake.

Then my gaze wandered up in another direction.
To some beautiful swans, oh, what noise they did make.
They splashed and they fluttered, but seemed quite contented
On the lovely blue waters of Castlefore Lake.

A boat being near me, I took the advantage
To go for a sail to some different place,
I sailed straight across and enjoyed the fresh breezes
On the lovely blue waters of Castlefore Lake.

On the opposite side of the lake I just landed.
When I woke from my slumber in this far foreign place
I felt happy and longed for to dream once again, on
The lovely blue waters of Castlefore Lake".

== See also ==
- List of loughs in Ireland
