= Keshcarrigan Bowl =

Iron Age bronze bowl

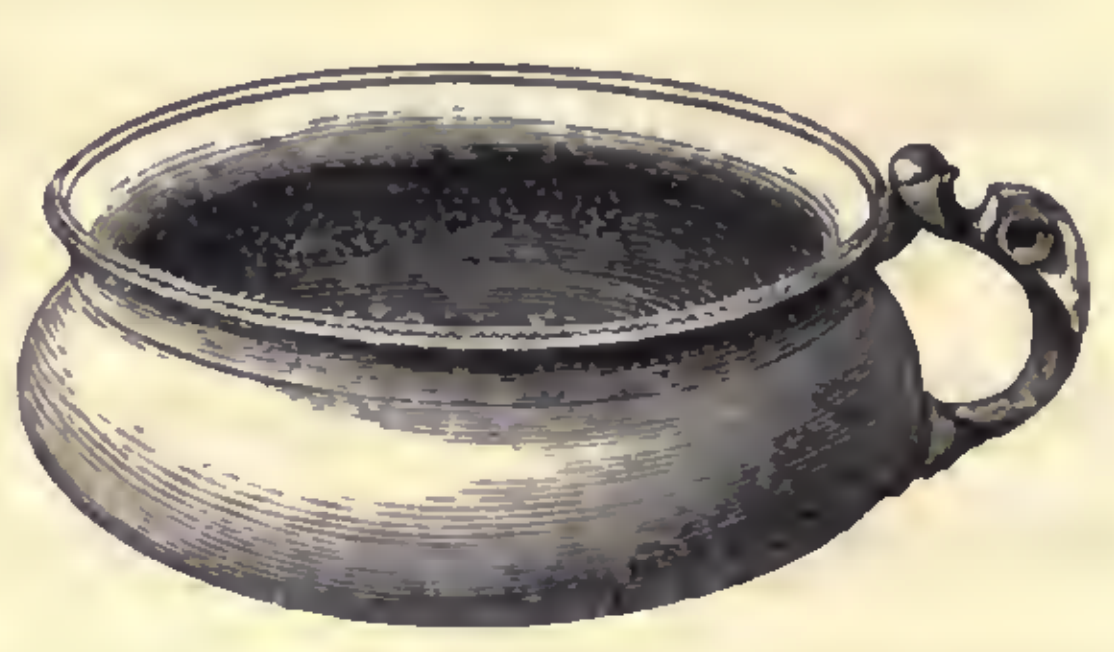
Illustration of the Keshcarrigan Bronze bowl; photos.

The Keshcarrigan Bowl is an Iron Age bronze bowl discovered to the north of Keshcarrigan, County Leitrim, Ireland, in the 19th century. The bowl was found in the waterway between Lough Scur and Lough Marrave ("lake of death"). It was perhaps a ceremonial drinking cup. The bowl would have been a prestigious item in 1st century Ireland, the bird-shaped handle superbly designed and skillfully executed. The Keshcarrigan Bowl is in the archaeology branch of the National Museum of Ireland.

The Keshcarrigan bowl is considered one of the finest classic cast bronze cups, or drinking vessel. Made of bright-yellow metal, it was discovered c. 1842 – c. 1850 during the building of the "Ulster Canal". The bowl is a fine golden bronze only 14 centimetres (5.5 in) wide and 1 millimetre (0.039 in) in thickness. It was cast or beaten into shape before being finished and polished by being spun on a lathe. The neck was finished off against an internal mould. The principal decorative feature of the bowl is its cast bronze zoomorphic handle, following the graceful shape of a bird-beast head of a somewhat undistinguished appearance influenced by the exuberant ornamentation of its time, soldered to the body of the vessel at the base and loosely connected to the vessel neck. The ridge at the front of the bird-head, the 'shield' below, and impression of a beak turning-backward, are all characteristic of the male-Shelduck.

In 2018, it was shown on an Irish postage stamp, after featuring in A History of Ireland in 100 Objects.

== Style ==
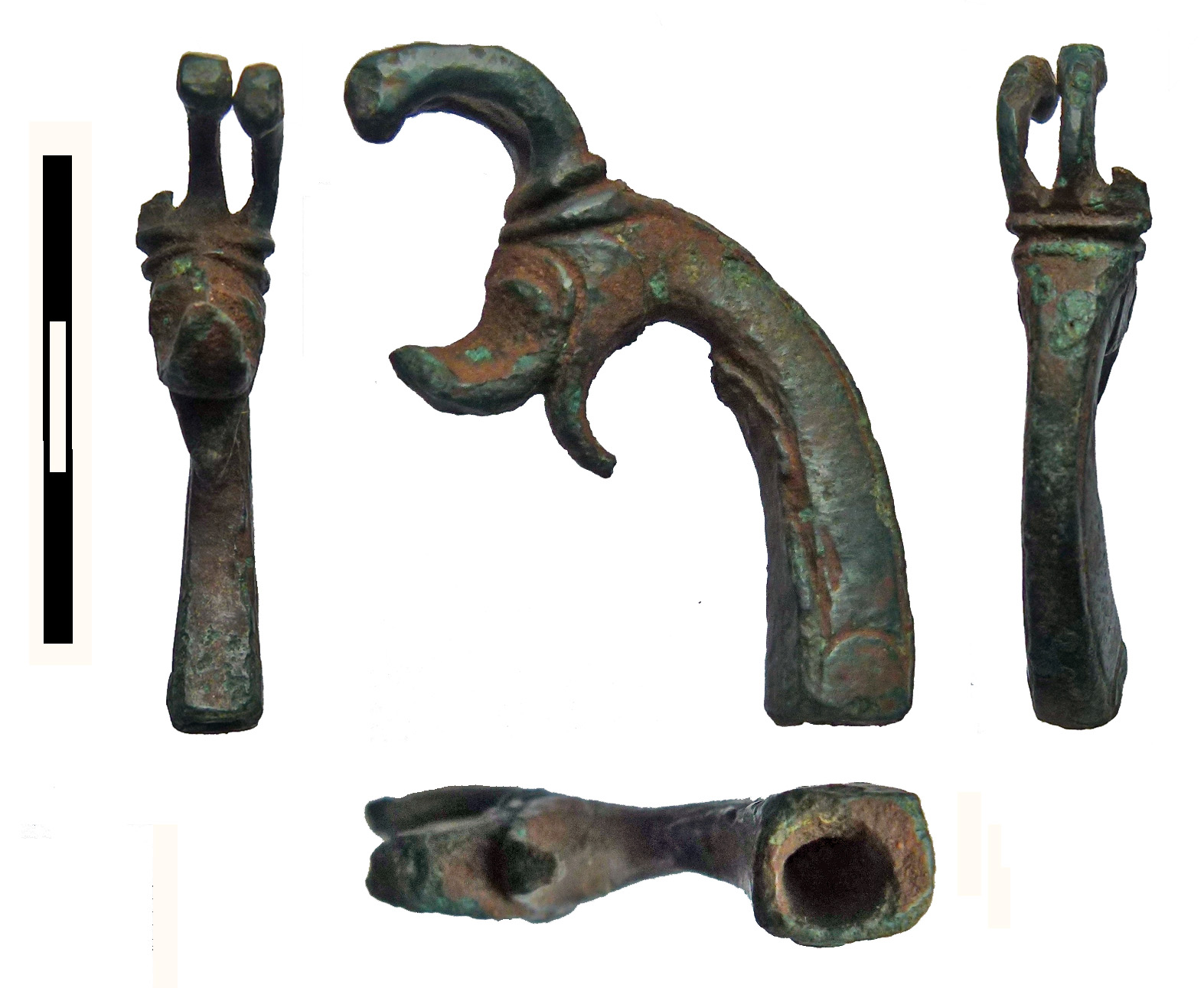
FAKL-8A09C2, Medieval Mount bearing resemblance to 'Keshcarrigan bowl' mount.

The brilliantly modeled ducks-head handle on the Keshcarrigan bowl is an early masterpiece of the style, comparable to the best British work of the time such as the bird-finials on the Torrs Chamfrein horns, the stylistic identity of both heads representing ducks, and both having empty slots for studs in the eyes. The Torrs style originated in Britain in the middle or second half of the third century BC. The Keshcarrigan cup is on stylistic grounds likely to be contemporary with the Torrs pieces. The "crimped" pattern on the rim of the Keshcarrigan bowl is perhaps comparable with similar techniques used on the circular Wandsworth boss and the terminal circular insignias on the Witham Shield. The bowl seems to have close affinities to pottery bowls of identical profile from Brittany, which have a similar "crimped" pattern on their inner rims. Being lathe-spun, the age of the bowl suggests a comparatively late date at variance with the stylistic evidence. The bowl is of importance in showing the Torrs style is recorded in both Britain and Ireland. The cup resembles another found at Fore, County Westmeath, which is slightly earlier and imported from Britain, as this may also be.

== Purpose ==
The bowl was intended for drinking purposes, for eating food out of, as a container, and ceremonial purposes. Metal handled cups are a feature of late La Tène culture, and their production might have been stimulated by the re-appearance of wine-services imported from the Classical world. (Note: The bowl was found in, or beside, Lough Marrave (Irish: Loch Marbh, "dead lake" or "lake of death"), perhaps deposited as a pagan ritual offering.)

== Origin ==
Some sources suggest the bowl was imported across the Irish Sea because the practice of producing bronze bowls using a spinning technique was done in the Belgae workshops of south-east England, and Roman continental workshops, rather than Ireland. However, the evidence for this conclusion is conjecture, and the Keshcarrigan bowl was just as likely made in Ireland. A reasonably close parallel to the Keshcarrigan cup is a handled vessel of willow, presumably Irish origin, in the National Museum of Ireland, and another bronze handle from a similar profile cup was discovered at County Galway. Conversely, though a similar handle was recently discovered in the Somerset hoard, no other vessel of this style was found in southern Britain, so the practice of making bowls with ornamental bird handles must have become established in Ireland sometime in the early 1st century AD.

=== Belgae refugees ===
O'Toole suggested the Keshcarrigan Bowl represents evidence for the movement of people into Ireland following upheavals in Celtic Europe in the century before and after the birth of Christ. Gallic Belgic tribes crossed into Britain as refugees from the Romans and displacing native people some of whom came to Ireland.

== See also ==
- Kiltubrid Shield
