= St. John's Lough =

Lake in south County Leitrim, Ireland

- Loch Eoin (Irish)
- Location in Ireland
- Location: County Leitrim
- Coordinates: 54°2′25″N 7°51′47″W
- Primary inflows: Shannon–Erne Waterway
- Primary outflows: Shannon–Erne Waterway
- Catchment area: 22.56 km^{2} (8.7 sq mi)
- Basin countries: Ireland
- Max. length: 3 km (1.9 mi)
- Surface area: 1.46 km^{2} (0.56 sq mi)
- Max. depth: 5 m (16 ft)
- Surface elevation: 60 m (200 ft)

St. John's Lough (Irish: Loch Eoin), also known as St. John's Lake, is an irregularly shaped freshwater lake located in south County Leitrim, in northwest of Ireland. The lake forms part of the wider Shannon–Erne Waterway tourist attraction. The ecology of John's Lough, and the Shannon-system, is threatened by pollution and invasive species such as curly waterweed, zebra mussel, and freshwater clam.

== Etymology ==
Named after Irish: Eóin Baiste, meaning "John the Baptist", the lake is therefore named "the lake of John".

== Geography ==
St. John's Lough is a shallow freshwater lake 4 kilometres (2.5 mi) west of Ballinamore, covering a surface area somewhere between 1.46 km^{2} (0.6 sq mi) and 1.89 km^{2} (0.7 sq mi). Saint John's Lough extends from Ballyduff Bridge in the north-east, before dividing into three broad reaches separated by narrow passes, or straits. The "Derrymacoffin Pass" connects the Ballinamore canal and northern lake portion to the central John's lough, and the "Muckross Pass" connects the central lough to the southern lough. The catchment area comprises Forestry (2%), pasture (55%), and other agriculture (43%), according to CORINE data. The R208 regional road follows the lakes northern boundary, crossing the Ballinamore canal at Ballyduff Bridge.

== Ecology ==
Fish present in John's Lough include "roach-bream hybrids", Roach, Perch, Bream (1-2lbs), and Pike. The pike population is the "native Irish strain" (Irish: liús meaning 'Irish Pike') not the other European Pike strain (Irish: gailliasc meaning 'strange or foreign fish'). The water quality was reported to be satisfactory c. 2001 – c. 2003 with a mesotrophic rating. (Note: Trophic states of "Oligotrophic" and "Mesotrophic" are desirable, but freshwater lakes rated 'Eutrophic' or 'Hypertrophic' indicates pollution.)

Repeated instances of significant illegal dumping and littering has been reported in recent years.

== Ancient lake dwellers ==
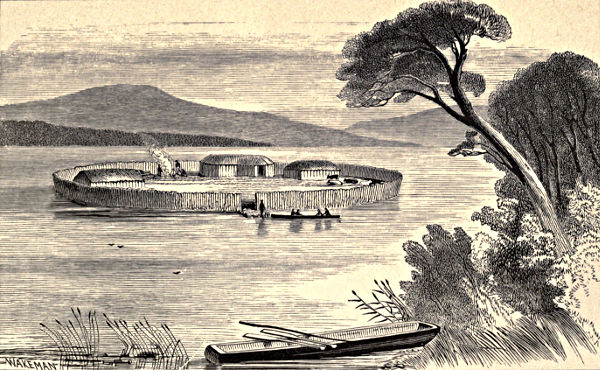
Illustration of (crannog)

Four ancient crannogs were reported at St. John's Lough. (Note: Confused folklore claimed these islands, water levels being sufficiently low, were used for the illicit grinding of corn possibly during penal times.) The crannogs were probably occupied during at least the 13th or the early 14th century, and lands surrounding John's Lough were covered by woodland during the Middle Ages.

== Heritage ==
=== Museum artefacts ===
The following archaeological artefacts were recovered at Saint John's Lough in the 19th century, c. 1843 – c. 1852, and now preserved at the Royal Irish Academy museum, or at the National Museum of Ireland-

- Three silver coins of the reigns of Edward I or Edward II, and Edward III found on a Crannog.
- Bronze pin, and Short bronze sword, found at Ballyduff Bridge near John's Lough.

=== Ancient church ===
According to the Annals of the Four Masters an ancient church standing on the northern shore of Saint John's Lough (nearby where the Yellow River ["An Gheirgthigh"] enters the Lough at Irish: Tuaim Luascáin, meaning 'Tomloskan') was destroyed in 1244AD.

- "M1244.6: They proceeded to Ath-na-Cuirre, on the River Geirctheach, but the flood had then overflowed its banks, and they were not able to cross the ford; so they pulled down the chapel-house of St. John the Baptist, which was on the margin of the ford, that they might place its materials across the river, that the army might pass over it".

== Human settlements ==
The primary human settlements around St John's lough is Fenagh village and Ballinamore town.

== See also ==
- List of loughs in Ireland

== References and notes ==
=== Primary sources ===
- MacMahon, John (1845). Correspondence relative to the navigation between Lough Erne and the River Shannon (Report). Vol. Parliamentary Papers, House of Commons and Command, Volume 45. H.M. Stationery Office.
- EPA (2006). "A Reference Based Typology and Ecological Assessment System for Irish Lakes" (PDF). Environmental Protection Agency (Ireland).
- anglingireland. "St. Johns and Kiltybardan Loughs". Inland Fisheries Ireland.

=== Secondary sources ===
- logainm.ie. "Loch Eoin/Saint John's Lough". Placenames Database of Ireland. Government of Ireland – Department of Arts, Heritage and the Gaeltacht and Dublin City University.
- O'Donovan, John, ed. (1856). Annála Rioghachta Éireann. Annals of the Kingdom of Ireland by the Four Masters ... with a Translation and Copious Notes. 7 vols. Translated by O'Donovan (2nd ed.). Dublin: Royal Irish Academy. CELT editions. Full scans at Internet Archive: Vol. 1; Vol. 2; Vol. 3; Vol. 4; Vol. 5; Vol. 6; Indices.
- Mulvany, W. T.; Fraser, William; Roberts, Samuel; Mulvany, Thomas J.; O'Flaherty, John (1852). Appendix No. V: Notices of Antiquities Presented to the Royal Irish Academy by W. T. Mulvany, Esq., M. R. I. A., on the Part of the Commissioners of Public Works. Proceedings of the Royal Irish Academy (Report). Vol. (1850–1853). Royal Irish Academy. pp. xxxi–lxvi. JSTOR 20489812.
- Haug, Per Ivar (2013). "Gazetteer of Ireland". Til Opplysning, A Series of Papers from the University Library in Trondheim, No. 16 (Third ed.). Hommelvik: UBiT, Universitetsbiblioteket i Trondheim.
- discoverireland.ie (2017). "Coarse Angling Ballinamore".
- Joyce, P. W. (1900). "Leitrim". Atlas and Cyclopedia of Ireland. libraryireland.com 2005–2015.
- Clenaghan, Conor; Clinton, Frank; Crowe, Matthew (2005). Phosphorus Regulations National Implementation Report (PDF) (Report). Environmental Protection Agency, Office of Environmental Enforcement.
- "Illegal Dumping at St. John's Lake". Leitrim Observer (15 December 2014 ed.). 2014.
- "Shameful act of illegal dumping at St. John's Lake, Ballinamore". Leitrim Observer (13 February 2016 ed.). 2016.
- Pedreschi, D.; Kelly-Quinn, M.; Caffrey, J; O'Grady, M.; Mariani, S.; Phillimore, A. (2014), "Genetic structure of pike (Esox lucius) reveals a complex and previously unrecognized colonization history of Ireland", Journal of Biogeography, 41 (3), Journal of Biogeography, 41(3), 548–560.: 548–560, doi:10.1111/jbi.12220, PMC 4238397, PMID 25435649
