= Keshcarrigan Lough =

Lake in County Leitrim, Ireland

- Ceis Charraigín Loch (Irish)
- Location in Ireland
- Location: County Leitrim
- Coordinates: 54°01′50″N 7°57′26″W
- Lake type: Freshwater
- Basin countries: Ireland
- Surface area: 0.39 km^{2} (0.15 sq mi)
- Max. depth: 4 m (13 ft)
- Surface elevation: 62 m (203 ft)
- Islands: 1

Keshcarrigan Lough (Irish: Ceis Charraigín loch, meaning 'Kesh, or causeway, near the little rock, lake') is a mesotrophic freshwater lake near Keshcarrigan in County Leitrim, Ireland. Known for quality coarse fishing, the lake allows bank fishing from concrete stands on the northern shore, two with wheelchair access. The ecology of Keshcarrigan Lough, and other county waterways, is threatened by curly waterweed, zebra mussel, and freshwater clam invasive species.

== Etymology ==
The lake is named from the bordering townland of "Keshcarrigan" (Irish: Ceis Charraigín), meaning the "Kesh, or causeway, near the little rock".

== Geography ==
Keshcarrigan Lough lies due south of Keshcarrigan village and Lough Scur, in Kiltubrid parish in south County Leitrim. The lake forms a tilted oblong shape, with a surface-area of 0.39 square kilometres (0.2 sq mi), with depths of 4 metres (13.1 ft). The level of Keshcarrigan Lough is the same as Lough Scur, and a channel of about 400 metres (1,312.3 ft) connects both lakes. The lake is bounded by the townlands of Keshcarrigan to the north, Clooney to the south, Laheen to the west, Carrick to the north, and Toomans to the east.

== Ecology ==
Fish present in Keshcarrigan Lough include "roach-bream hybrids", Roach, Perch, Bream up to 4lbs, and Pike. The pike population is the "native Irish strain" (Irish: liús meaning 'Irish Pike') not the other European Pike strain (Irish: gailliasc meaning 'strange or foreign fish'). The lake has stocks of Pike up to 8 pounds (3.6 kg).

=== Crayfish ===
A thriving population of white-clawed crayfish was reported here in 2009. Keshcarrigan Lough, with a shallow rocky shore, has some ideal potential white-clawed crayfish habitat, but the ecology is seriously threatened by zebra mussel infestation, and indiscriminate importation of non-indigenous crayfish species.

== Human settlement ==
The primary human settlement at Keshcarrigan Lough is the village of Keshcarrigan.

== See also ==
- List of loughs in Ireland
- Keshcarrigan
