= Garadice Lough =

Lake in County Leitrim, Ireland

- Loch Guth Ard Deas (Irish)
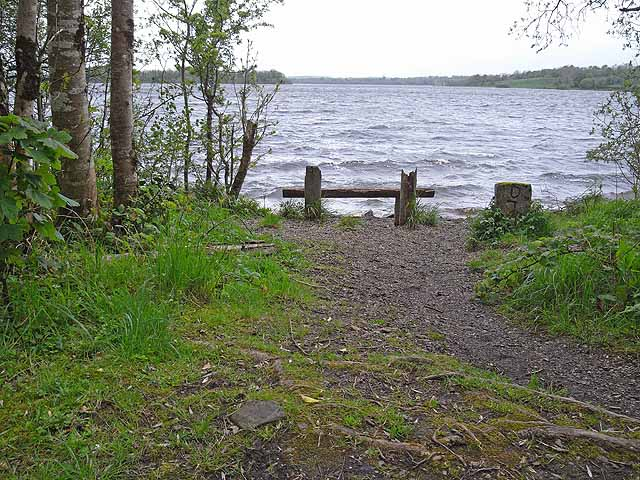

- Location in Ireland
- Location: County Leitrim
- Coordinates: 54°2′52″N 7°43′5″W
- Primary inflows: Shannon–Erne Waterway
- Primary outflows: Shannon–Erne Waterway
- Catchment area: 183.91 km^{2} (71.0 sq mi)
- Basin countries: Northern Ireland, Republic of Ireland
- Max. width: 3 km (2 mi)
- Surface area: 3.89 km^{2} (1.50 sq mi)
- Average depth: 5 m (16 ft)
- Max. depth: 20 m (66 ft)
- Surface elevation: 49 m (161 ft)
- Islands: 3

Garadice Lough (Irish: Loch Guth Ard Deas (meaning The South Lake of the High Voice), also known as Garadice Lake or Lough Garadice, is a freshwater lake in County Leitrim, Ireland. It is located in the south of the county and now forms part of the Shannon–Erne Waterway.

== Geography ==
Garadice Lough is located 8 kilometres (5 mi) east of Ballinamore in south County Leitrim. It is about 3 km (2 mi) wide from west to east and covers an area of 3.89 square kilometres (1.5 sq mi). The lake has three islands, two of which are named: Church Island and Cherry Island (Irish: Cloch-inse-na-dtorc).

== Hydrology ==
Garadice Lough now forms part of the Shannon–Erne Waterway. Its inflow was formerly named the Yellow River and the outflow was the Woodford River (Irish: Sruth Gráinne, meaning 'the Gravelly Stream' or 'the Gravelly River'; also anglicised as the River Gráinne or the Graine River). The Woodford River flows out of Little Garadice Lake, which is on the eastern edge of Garadice Lough, with the river flowing north-eastwards via Ballyconnell, eventually emptying into Upper Lough Erne near Teemore in the south of County Fermanagh.

== Natural history ==
Fish present in Garadice Lough include tench, roach, bream and pike. Large pike have been caught here weighing 10 kg (22 lb) or more.

== Ecology ==
The water quality was reported to be satisfactory c. 2001 – c. 2003 with a mesotrophic rating, improving to oligotrophic status c. 2004 – c. 2006, before dropping back to mesotrophic rating c. 2007 – c. 2009. (Note: Trophic states of "Oligotrophic" and "Mesotrophic" are desirable, but freshwater lakes rated 'Eutrophic' or 'Hypertrophic' indicates pollution.) Zebra mussel infestation is present. The ecology of Garadice Lough, and other Irish waterways, remains threatened by curly waterweed, and freshwater clam invasive species.

== History ==
The earliest surviving mention of the lake is in the 9th century Vita tripartita Sancti Patricii, in connection with the crossing of the lake by Saint Patrick on his way to destroy the idol Crom Cruach. In medieval times Garadice Lough was known as Lough Finvoy (Irish: Loch Finn Mhagh, meaning 'The Lake of the White Plain'). The lake is mentioned several times in the Irish Annals- Annals of the Four Masters 1386 and Annals of Connacht 1257 & 1418. In about 1257 the fortress "Cloch-inse-na-dtorc, in Lough Finvoy, was burned by O'Rourke" (a King of West Breifne).

== See also ==
- List of loughs in Ireland

== References and notes ==
=== Secondary sources ===
- Clenaghan, Conor; Clinton, Frank; Crowe, Matthew (2005). Phosphorus Regulations National Implementation Report (PDF) (Report). Environmental Protection Agency, Office of Environmental Enforcement.
- Pedreschi, D.; Kelly-Quinn, M.; Caffrey, J; O'Grady, M.; Mariani, S.; Phillimore, A. (2014). "Genetic structure of pike (Esox lucius) reveals a complex and previously unrecognized colonization history of Ireland". Journal of Biogeography. 41 (3): 548–560. doi:10.1111/jbi.12220. PMC 4238397. PMID 25435649.
- Aquatic Environment Office of Environmental Assessment (2010). Martin McGarrigle; John Lucey; Micheál Ó Cinnéide (eds.). Water Quality in Ireland 2007-2009 (PDF) (Report). EPA.
