= R209 road (Ireland) =

Road in Ireland

Coordinates: 54.023781°N 7.852849°W

R209 road
- Bóthar R209
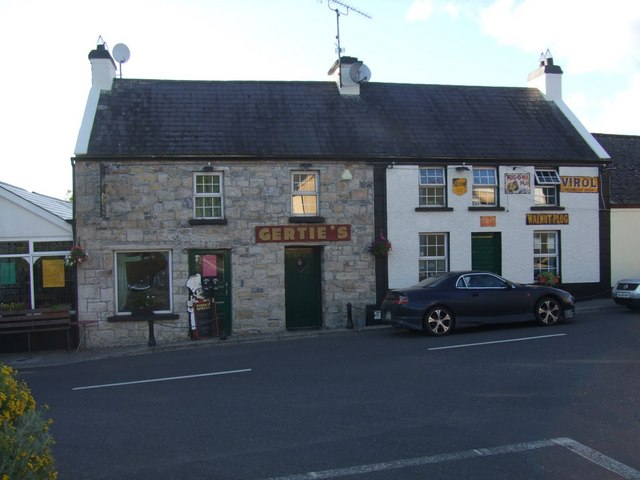
- R209 passing Gertie's Pub, Keshcarrigan

Route information
- Length: 15 km (9.3 mi)

Major junctions
- From: R280 Drumheckil
- Crosses Ballinamore-Ballyconnell canal R210 Letterfine; Passes through Keshcarrigan
- To: R202 Fenagh

Location
- Country: Ireland

Highway system
- Roads in Ireland; Motorways; Primary; Secondary; Regional

The R209 road is a regional road in Ireland, located in County Leitrim.
