= Keshcarrigan =

Keshcarrigan Ceis Charraigín
- Village
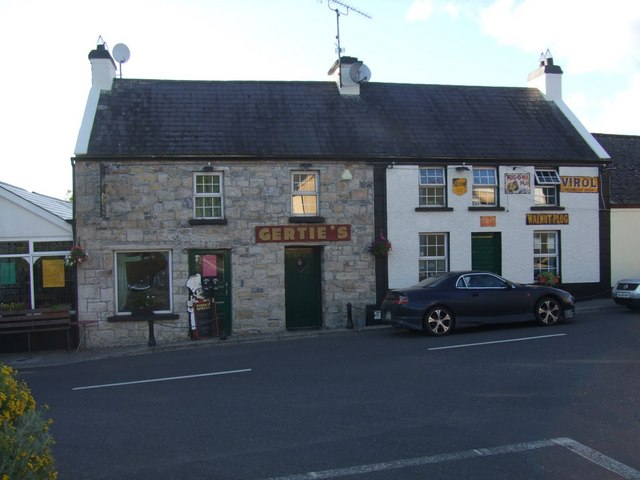
- Pub in Keshcarrigan

- Location in Ireland
- Coordinates: 54°01′04″N 7°56′36″W
- Country: Ireland
- Province: Connacht
- County: County Leitrim
- Elevation: 56 m (184 ft)

Population (2016)
  - Total: 155
- Time zone: UTC+0 (WET)
  - Summer (DST): UTC-1 (IST (WEST))
- Irish Grid Reference: H037076

Keshcarrigan (Irish: Ceis Charraigín, meaning 'Kesh, or causeway, near the little rock') is a village in County Leitrim, Ireland. It is situated on the Shannon-Erne Waterway and R209 road and under Sheebeg (Sí Beag), an ancient pagan burial site which overlooks Lough Scur to the north and Keshcarrigan Lough to the south. Keshcarrigan features in the writing of the novelist John McGahern who lived nearby.

== History ==
The village of Keshcarrigan probably originates from ancient "lake dweller" human settlements of nearby Lough Scur and, in recent centuries, activities associated with Reynolds manor. In 1798, the French Army under General Humbert passed through on the way to eventual defeat at the Battle of Ballinamuck. Through the 19th and much of the 20th century, eleven market fairs were held at Keshcarrigan annually (see notes). These fair days are no longer extant, (Note: Keshcarrigan Fair Days -1 January, 1 February, 17 March, 1 May, 24 or 29 June, 1 or 2 August, 21 September, 8 or 19 October, 1 November and 21 December) although the fair green in the centre of the village has been redeveloped into a small park. More recently, Keshcarrigan has become known for its alternative St. Patrick's Day parades which have included an invisible parade, an indoor parade (in a local pub) and a walking backwards parade.

About 1 km west of Keshcarrigan on the road to Carrick-on-Shannon there is a collapsed dolmen overlooking Lough Scur. Medieval ruins of Castle John and Jail Island are located near the village, at Lough Scur. In 1854 a Bronze Age gold artifact which became known as the 'Keshcarrigan Bowl' was discovered in the waterways between Lough Scur and Lough Marrave, north of the village.

== Demographics ==
In the 2011 census the Electoral Division of Keshcarrigan (an area larger than the village) had 472 residents. This was an increase from the 270 residents recorded in 2001. The village experienced changes in the early 21st century with over 100 new houses being built mainly as a result of a controversial government tax incentive scheme (Section 23).

== Amenities and sport ==
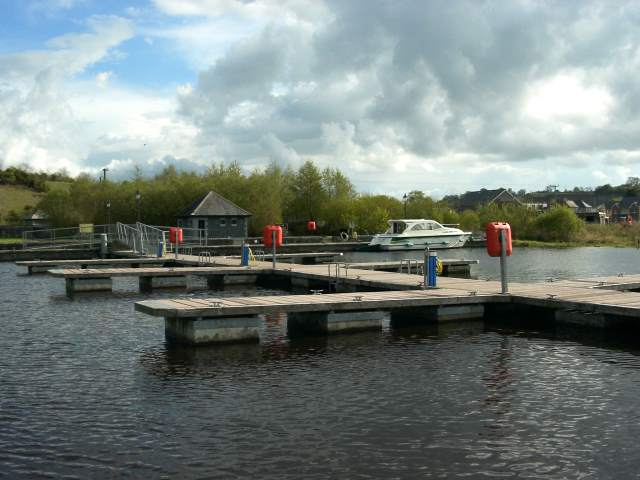
Keshcarrigan marina on Lough Scur

About 1km south of the village on the road to Mohill, a small park on the shores of Keshcarrigan Lough is dedicated to the memory of Mychal Judge, chaplain of the New York Fire Department and the first recorded victim of the 2001 attack on the World Trade Center. Fr Judge's ancestral home was opposite the park.

The main local sports club is Kiltubrid GAA. The senior men's team were Leitrim Senior Football Champions in 2005 and the senior women's team in 2015 and 2016. The latter also went on to contest Connacht finals in both those years.

There are a number of angling centres near Kesh, including Lough Scur, Keshcarrigan Lough, Carrickaport Lough and the Shannon–Erne Waterway.

== Local manor houses and estates ==
Laheen Estate and Letterfine House (built c. 1800) near Keshcarrigan are associated with the Reynolds (Lough Scur) and Peyton families, prominent local landowners who had intermarried in the early 18th century. The original houses associated with the properties no longer exist.

== People ==
- Eleanor Shanley, singer, is a native of the village.
- John McGahern, writer, lived about 3 km away at Laura (Rowan) Lough.

== See also ==
- List of towns and villages in Ireland
- Kiltubrid Shield

== References and notes ==
=== Sources ===
- Longman (1819). Traveller's New Guide Through Ireland, Containing a New and Accurate Description of the Roads (digitized from original in Lyon Public Library [2011] ed.). Longman.
- Watsons (1830). The Gentleman's and citizen's almanack ... for the year (PDF). Dublin, Printed for S. Watson [etc.]
- logainm.ie. "Ceis Charraigín".
