= Kiltubbrid Shield =

Iron Age wooden shield from Ireland

The Kiltubbrid Shield is a Bronze Age wooden shield from Ireland, discovered during the 19th century in the townland of Kiltubbrid, County Leitrim. It is probably the only perfect article of its description found in Europe, and dates from the Bronze Age, although it has been thought to date from the late Celtic (La Tène) period.

== Description ==
The Kiltubbrid shield is a remarkably well-preserved example of an ancient Irish wooden shield. It was discovered in 1863, buried 3 metres (9.8 ft) deep in a turf bog, at Kiltubbrid townland and just north of Lough Scur. The shield is a perfect specimen, oval in shape, with an impeccable central boss 7.6 centimetres (3.0 in) high, and seven slightly raised concentric circles (ribs), plain on the reverse, with a handle, the whole carved out of a single piece of wood. The original measurements were 66 centimetres (26.0 in) in height by 53 centimetres (20.9 in) in width, with a thickness of 1.25 centimetres (0.5 in). Unlike ancient classic shields, through which the forearm was passed, the Irish wooden shield, grasped by the cross-piece underneath the umbo (boss), could be projected to full arm's length during battle. The wood was probably alder.

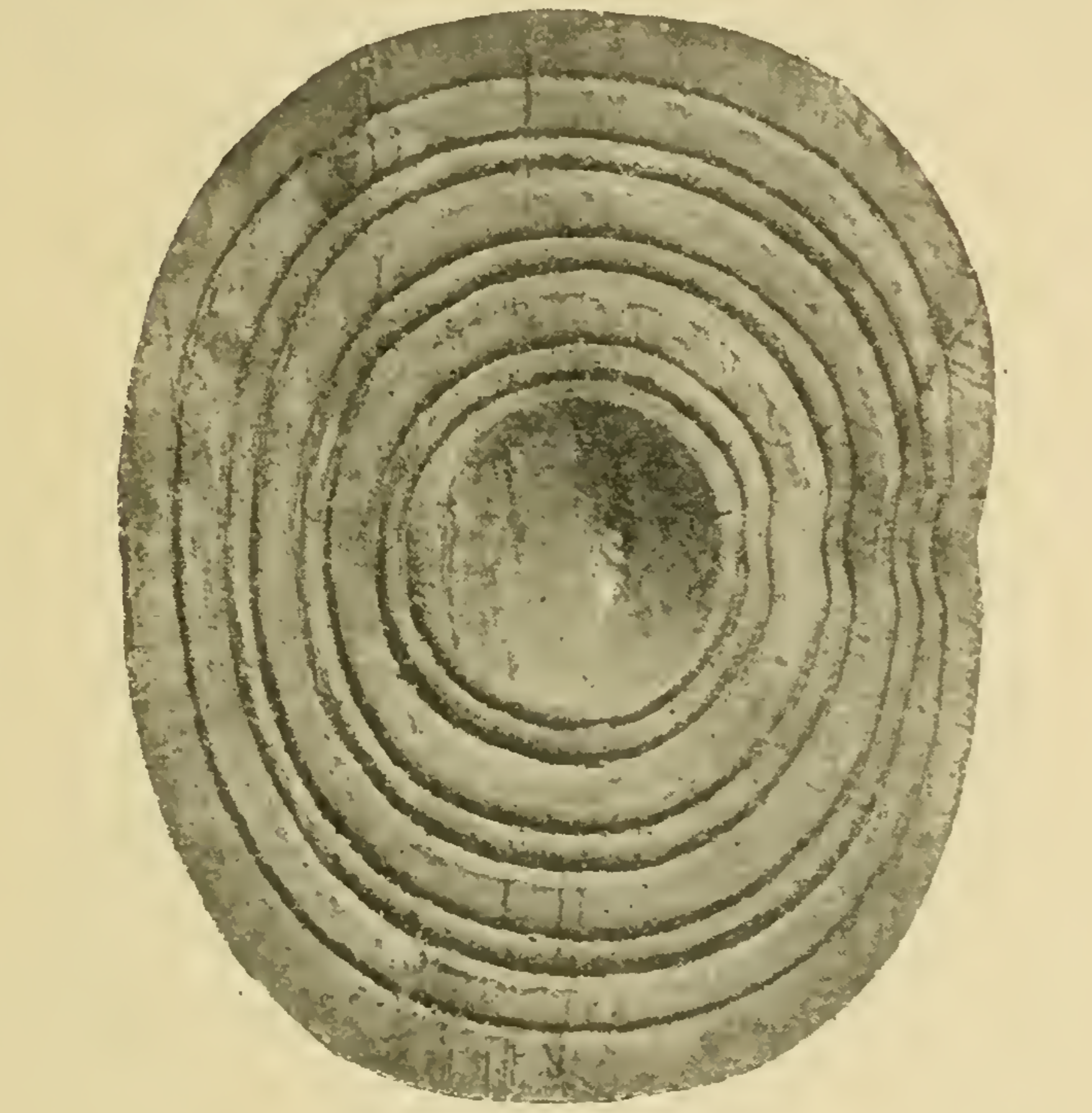
1st Illustration

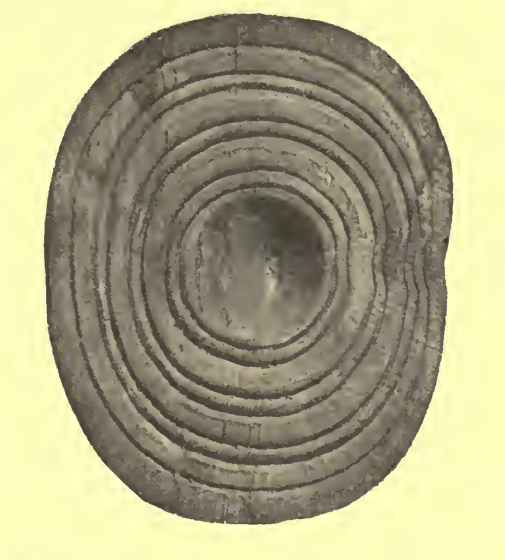
2nd illustration

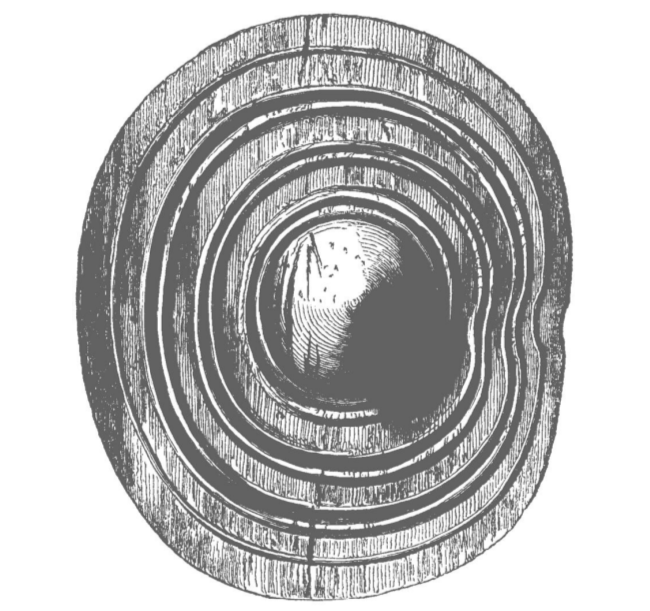
3rd illustration

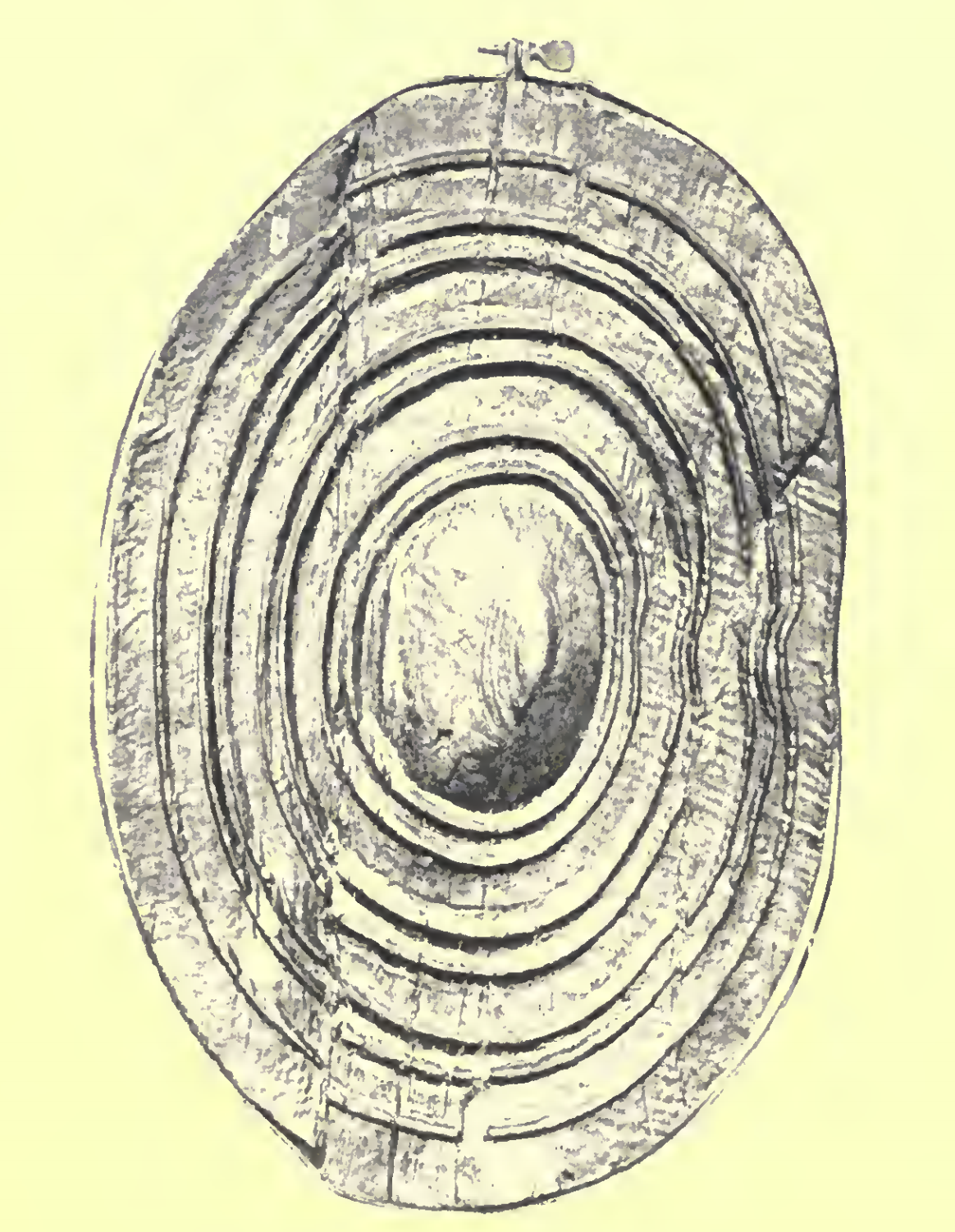
4th illustration

The shield was probably covered with leather, painted and decorated. The ribs show an indentation on one side, presenting an interruption in the symmetry of the ornament. Shrinkage may have caused the indentation. MacAllister wondered if the indentation is a survival of the observation-notch that adorned shield edges during the medieval period, or if this interruption of circular ornament reflected a widespread taboo and superstition against closed rings which prevailed at the time.

== Etymology ==
Ruaidhrí Ó Flaithbheartaigh stated in Ogygia (1685) that the Irish name for alder was Fearn, because "shields are made of it". The Irish word "sciath", i.e. shield, is more recently applied to a shallow wicker basket, of oval shape — sometimes called a skib — used for straining potatoes, and which closely resembles in size and form of the Kiltubbrid wooden shield.

== Purpose ==
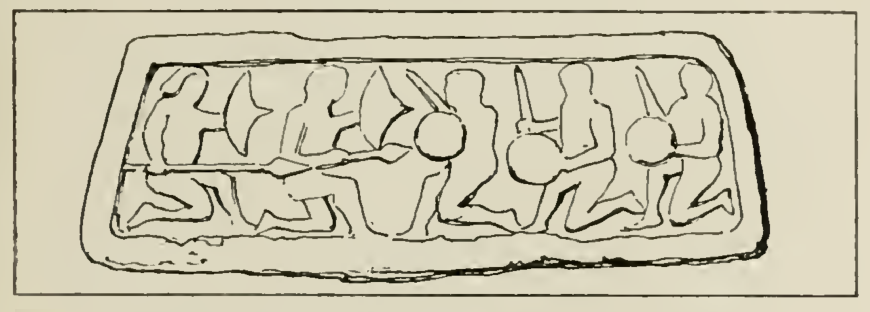
Irish Battle Scene Swords, Spears, and Shields

The toughness and density of the alder would, in itself, be a firm defence against the thrusts of swords, if not spears, but half-inch thick wooden shields would be useless against Roman javelins.

An illustration sculptured on a stone cross at Kells, County Meath evidently depicts a conflict between different tribes or cultures; one armed with long-handled spears and circular bossed-shields, the opposing warrior shields have no boss, and are armed with short swords, of a kind often found on crannogs and first adopted with the introduction of iron as a primary material for weapons of warfare.

== See also ==
- Keshcarrigan Bowl
