= Kiltubbrid =

Kiltubrid Cill Tiobraid
- Civil parish
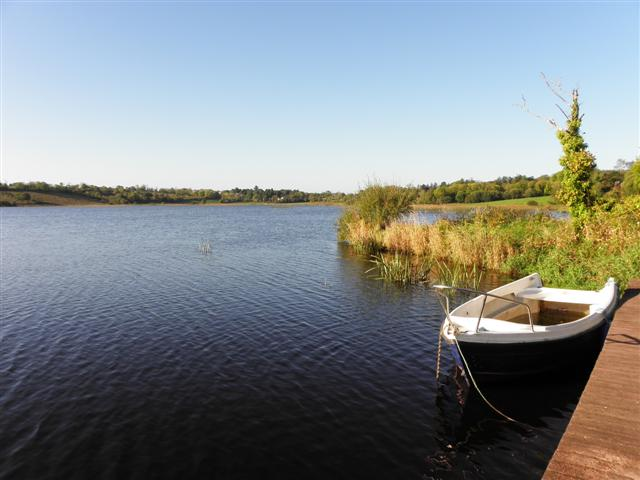
- Lough Scur lies within Kiltubrid civil parish

- Location in Ireland
- Coordinates: 54.0353°N 7.95°W
- Country: Ireland
- Province: Connacht
- County: County Leitrim
- Irish Grid Reference: H033096

Kiltubrid or Kiltubbrid (Irish: Cill Tiobraid) is a civil parish in the barony of Leitrim, County Leitrim, Ireland. The villages of Keshcarrigan and Drumcong lie within the civil parish.

== History ==
The name Kiltubrid derives from the Irish Cill Tiobraid meaning "church of the well". This may be a reference to an ancient church in Muintir Eolais. This building was substantially demolished during Penal times. The remaining ruins are located beside a holy well dedicated to Saint Patrick. Folklore relates that the well was infilled when the church was demolished, but sprang up a short distance away.

On 5 December 1640, the Committee of Irish affairs of the Long Parliament upheld a petition against Frederick Hamilton from a native noble "Tirlagh Mac Raghnaill (Reynolds) of Kiltubrid parish", which complained "hee had been prosecuted uniustlie for lands in the Countie of Leytrim in Ireland" by "Sir Fredericke Hambledon".

The Kiltubrid Shield was discovered in the 19th century in the townland and parish of Kiltubrid. Evidence of human settlement at Lough Scur has been dated to the New Stone Age.

== Sport ==
Kiltubrid GAA is the local Gaelic Athletic Association club. The club won the Leitrim Senior Football Championship in 2005.
