= Drumcong =

Village in County Leitrim, Ireland

Drumcong Droim Conga
- Village
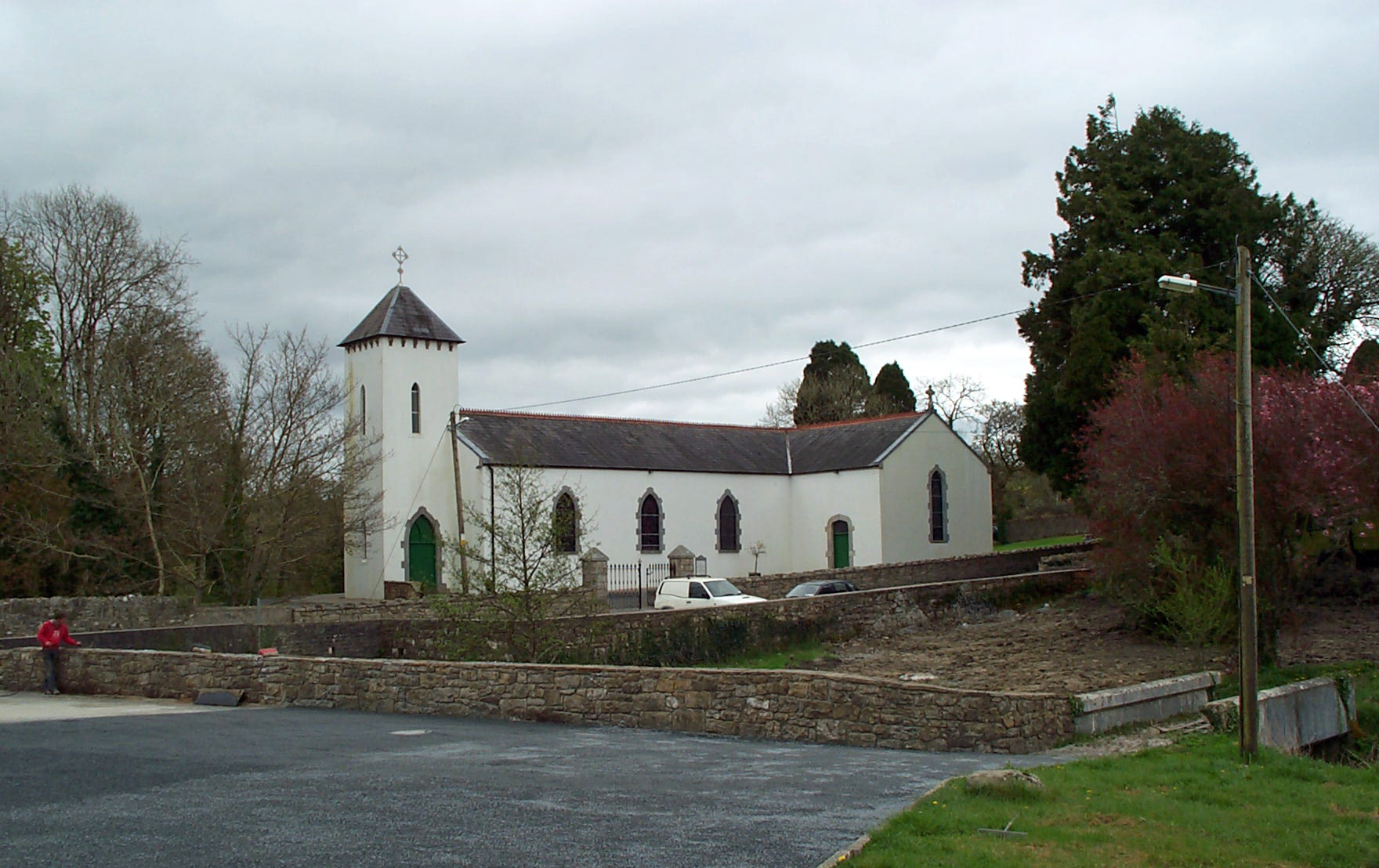
- St. Brigid's R.C. Church in Drumcong

- Location in Ireland
- Coordinates: 54°01′41″N 7°58′20″W
- Country: Ireland
- Province: Connacht
- County: County Leitrim
- Elevation: 69 m (226 ft)
- Time zone: UTC+0 (WET)
  - Summer (DST): UTC-1 (IST (WEST))
- Irish Grid Reference: H018087

Drumcong (Irish: Droim Conga, meaning 'Ridge of the Cong, a narrow neck or strait') is a village in County Leitrim, Ireland, located between Lough Scur and Carrickaport Lough.

== Overview ==
Drumcong is between Ballinamore and Carrick-on-Shannon on the R208 road. The village consists of St. Bridget's National School, also known as Drumcong Central School, St. Brigid's Church, burial grounds, and two businesses. St. Brigid's Church, of Roman Catholic denomination, is a barn church which was restored after falling into disuse for two decades.

The Lakeside Tavern, a pub and shop, is owned and operated by James and Eilis Cardiff. Drumcong is classed as a Tier 4 Village in Leitrim County Council's Development Plan 2009–2015.

The village of Drumcong developed around Kiltubrid Railway Station, which opened on 16 June 1885 and closed on 18 October 1958.

== See also ==
- Kiltubbrid
- List of towns and villages in Ireland

== Notes and references ==
=== Secondary sources ===
- Joyce, P. W. (Patrick Weston) (1913). Irish names of places (PDF). Vol. v.3. Dublin : Phoenix.
