= Carrickaport lough =

Lake in County Leitrim, Ireland

Carrickaport Lough
- Carraig an Phoirt Loch (Irish)
- Location in Ireland
- Location: County Leitrim
- Coordinates: 54°1′48″N 7°58′58″W
- Lake type: Freshwater
- Basin countries: Ireland
- Surface area: 0.46 km^{2} (0.18 sq mi)
- Max. depth: 7 m (23 ft)
- Surface elevation: 63 m (207 ft)
- Islands: 1

Carrickaport lough (Irish: Carraig an Phoirt, meaning 'rocks of the bog [port, a bog here]') is a freshwater lake in Kiltubrid parish, south County Leitrim, Ireland. Drumcong village, and Lough Scur, lie nearby. Carrickaport lough is known for quality bream and pike fishing. The ecology of Carrickaport lough, and other county waterways, is threatened by curly waterweed, zebra mussel, and freshwater clam invasive species.

== Etymology ==
The lake takes its name from the bordering townland of "Carrickaport" (Irish: Carraig an Phoirt), meaning the "rock of the port (or fort, or bank)".

== Geography ==
Carrickaport lough is located due west of Drumcong village and Lough Scur, in County Leitrim. The lake has an hourglass shape with a surface-area of about 0.46 square kilometres (0.2 sq mi), and depths of 7 metres (23.0 ft). The level of Carrickaport lough is about 1 foot (0.3 m) higher than Lough Scur, and a small stream of 500 metres (1,640.4 ft) length running through Drumcong connects both lakes. Carrickaport lough is surrounded by high lands and bounded by the townlands of Drumbullog, Corderry (Morton), Carrickaport, Mullaghycullen, Drumcong, and Roscarban. The substrate consists of rock (15%), cobble (70%), gravel (10%) and sand (5%).

== Ecology ==
Fish present in Carrickaport include "Roach-Bream hybrids", Perch, Bream of 3-4lbs, Roach, and Pike. The pike population is the "native Irish strain" (Irish: liús meaning 'Irish Pike') not the other European Pike strain (Irish: gailliasc meaning 'strange or foreign fish'). The lake has stocks of Pike up to 10 pounds (4.5 kg). The water quality was reported to be satisfactory c. 2001 – c. 2003 with a mesotrophic rating. (Note: Trophic states of "Oligotrophic" and "Mesotrophic" are desirable, but freshwater lakes rated 'Eutrophic' or 'Hypertrophic' indicates pollution.)

=== Pollution ===
Following a survey in 2007 the condition of Carrickaport Lough was reported as "unsatisfactory" with Filamentous algae present, and pollution, along with a serious zebra mussel infestation, being also reported. Carrickaport Lough is reed-fringed, with approximately one fifth of substrate vegetation being common club-rush, while Potamogeton pondweed and the alien species Elodea canadensis are also present.

=== Crayfish extinction ===
Carrickaport lough, with a shallow rocky shore, has some ideal potential White-clawed crayfish habitat, While a population of White-clawed crayfish has previously been reported, no specimens were found when last surveyed in 2007. Indeed, crayfish are never been found with zebra mussel, and Irish stocks are threatened by non-indigenous crayfish species importation.

=== Rare moss ===
In August 2000 the "Weissia rostellata" moss, regarded as a rare species in Ireland, was found growing unshaded to partly-shaded (by grasses and rushes) on the damp clay-mud of a sparsely vegetated ditch beside the lake.

=== Other wildlife ===
The Lister's river snail (Viviparus fasciatus) is abundant, and hog louse is also present.

== Human settlement ==
The primary human settlement at Carrickaport is the village of Drumcong.

== See also ==
- List of loughs in Ireland

== Notes and references ==
=== References ===
- anglingireland. "Satellite Pike Waters in the Ballinamore and Keshcarrigan area". Inland Fisheries Ireland.
- "Carraig an Phoirt". pp. Archival records.
- Joyce, P. W. (Patrick Weston) (1913). Irish names of places (PDF). Vol. v.3. Dublin : Phoenix.
- Haug, Per Ivar (2011). "Gazetteer of Ireland" (Second ed.). Hommelvik: UBiT, Universitetsbiblioteket i Trondheim.
- Holyoak, David Thomas (2006). Weissia rostellata (Brid) Lindb (PDF) (Report). Plantlife.
- Leitrim Observer (1970). "Drumcong jamboree and dancing carnival". Leitrim Observer. Archived from the original on 2 February 2017.
- MacMahon, John (1845). Correspondence relative to the navigation between Lough Erne and the River Shannon (Report). Vol. Parliamentary Papers, House of Commons and Command, Volume 45 (Digitized 2006 from original in Harvard University ed.). H.M. Stationery Office.
- O’Connor, William; Hayes, Gerard; O'Keeffe, Ciaran; Lynn, Deirdre (2007). Monitoring of white-clawed crayfish Austropotamobius pallipes in Irish lakes in 2007 (PDF) (Report). Vol. Irish Wildlife Manuals No. 37. Environment, Heritage and Local government.
- Reynolds, Julian D. (2011). Rees M; Nightingale J; Holdich DM (eds.). White-Clawed Crayfish in Ireland - under increasing threat. Species Survival: Securing white-clawed crayfish in a changing environment. pp. 120–128.
- Pedreschi, D.; Kelly-Quinn, M.; Caffrey, J; O'Grady, M.; Mariani, S.; Phillimore, A. (2014). "Genetic structure of pike (Esox lucius) reveals a complex and previously unrecognized colonization history of Ireland". Journal of Biogeography. 41 (3): 548–560. doi:10.1111/jbi.12220. PMC 4238397. PMID 25435649.
- discoverireland.ie (2017). "Coarse Angling Keshcarrigan". Archived from the original on 4 February 2017.
- Clenaghan, Conor; Clinton, Frank; Crowe, Matthew (2005). Phosphorus Regulations National Implementation Report (PDF) (Report). Environmental Protection Agency, Office of Environmental Enforcement.
