= Lough Scur =

Lake in south County Leitrim, Ireland

- Loch an Scoir (Irish)
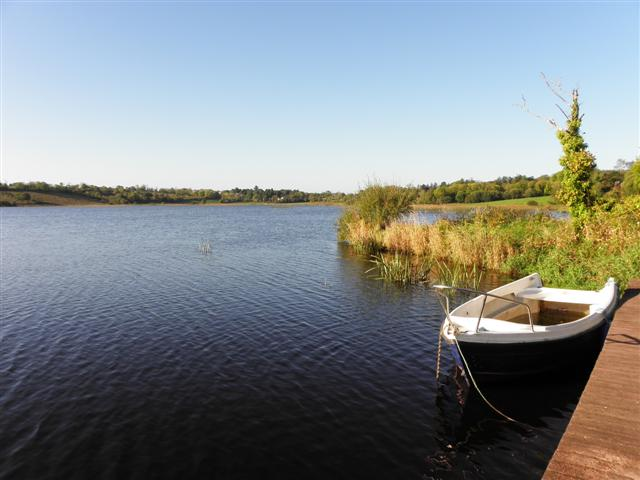
- Lough Scur at Corglass

- Location in Ireland
- Location: County Leitrim
- Coordinates: 54°1′31″N 7°57′21″W
- Lake type: Freshwater
- Primary inflows: Aghacashlaun River, Shannon–Erne Waterway
- Primary outflows: Shannon–Erne Waterway
- Catchment area: 62.87 km^{2} (24.3 sq mi)
- Basin countries: Ireland
- Surface area: 1.14 km^{2} (0.44 sq mi)
- Max. depth: 5 m (16 ft)
- Surface elevation: 62 m (203 ft)
- Islands: 2

Lough Scur (Irish: Loch an Scoir, meaning 'the lake of the horses, pasturage, troop' (Note: Scuir with an implied meaning of "troop" or "camp" might recall the garrison of Aodh O'Connor, whose castle stood here.)) is a freshwater lake in south County Leitrim, northwest Ireland. It is part of the Shannon–Erne Waterway. Human settlements have been present nearby since the New Stone Age. Modern features include quays and moorings. Protected features are Castle John, three Crannogs, and the causeway into Rusheen Island, though "Jail Island" is not protected. The ecology of Lough Scur, and indeed all county Leitrim lakes, is threatened by pollution and invasive species such as curly waterweed, zebra mussel, and freshwater clam.

== Etymology ==
Fanciful folklore of the 19th century claimed Lough Scur was named from Oscar son of Oisín, and his grave lay at Aghascur, "the field of the Scur". However, it is pointed out the word "Scur" (Irish: Scor, genitive scuir) has various meanings, and probably translates to "lake of the horse-stud". O'Donovan suggests Scuir means 'lake of the camp', and the placenames database of Ireland suggests Lough Scuir means 'lake of the horses, pasturage, troop'.

== Geography ==
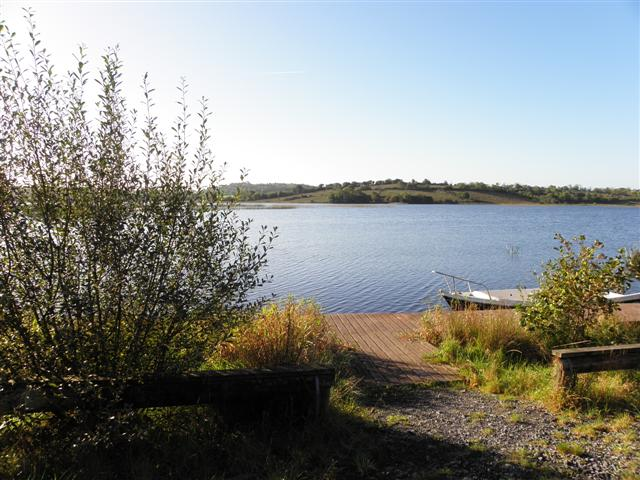
Lough Scur, Corglass (looking south)

Lough Scur is about 1 kilometre (0.6 mi) northwest of Keshcarrigan. It covers an area of 1.14 square kilometres (0.4 sq mi). Lough Scur is deep with generally a soft mud or compact peat bottom, the shallowest portion is the northern reach, between Driny and Drumcong, probably due to the large quantity of detritus carried into it by a mountain stream at Kiltubrid townland. Beyond the roscarbon shoal there is an isolated rock almost level with the summer water surface, nearly circular, measuring c. 10 – c. 15ft across. Lough Marrave might be considered a continuation of Lough Scur, as they share the same level and connected by a half-mile channel. Keshcarrigan lough is connected to Lough scur by a small stream about 250 metres (820.2 ft) in length. Carrickaport Lough drains into Lough Scur by a 450 metres (1,476.4 ft) stream running through Drumcong townland. Drumaleague Lough, lying 1 kilometre (0.6 mi) to the south west, is connected via the Shannon–Erne Waterway. Sub-glacial Rogen moraine landforms are evident in the valley between Slieve Anierin and Lough Scur, caused by ice age glaciers moving northeast to southwest over millions of years, the Morainic drift heaping up thousands of drumlins in the surrounding lowlands.

== Ecology ==
Fish present in Lough Scur include "roach-bream hybrids" (54%), Roach (22%), Perch (9%), Bream (9%, including. Skimmers), Pike (6%), nine-spine stickleback, and Eel. The large proportion of hybrids results from the Pike here preferring Roach (86%), Stickleback (9%), and Perch (4%) in their overall diet. The pike population is the "native Irish strain" (Irish: liús meaning 'Irish Pike') not the other European Pike strain (Irish: gailliasc meaning 'strange or foreign fish'). Large pike have been caught here weighing 10 kg (22 lb) or more. When surveyed in 2002, no zebra mussels were reported at the highest water level, (Note: White-clawed crayfish are typically not present where a zebra mussel infestation is found to exist; Carrickaport Lough nearby at Drumcong has zebra mussel infestation.) and in 2005 the water quality was rated as mesotrophic. (Note: Trophic states of "Oligotrophic" and "Mesotrophic" are desirable, but freshwater lakes rated 'Eutrophic' or 'Hypertrophic' indicates pollution.)

== Demography ==
=== Canal ===
Lough Scur forms part of the Shannon–Erne Waterway, lying at the summit of the canal connecting Lough Scur to the River Shannon, just south of Leitrim village. The original canal was constructed in the 1840s, fell into decline as the rail network prospered, but was reopened in 1994 to develop the region's tourism industry. The levels of Lough Scur are controlled by Waterways Ireland via two Spillways. The recording of large numbers of ancient dug-out canoes from county Leitrim remind us that waterways have always been a key means of transport in Ireland.

=== Villages ===
The primary human settlements at Lough Scur are the villages of Keshcarrigan and Drumcong.

== Historical heritage ==
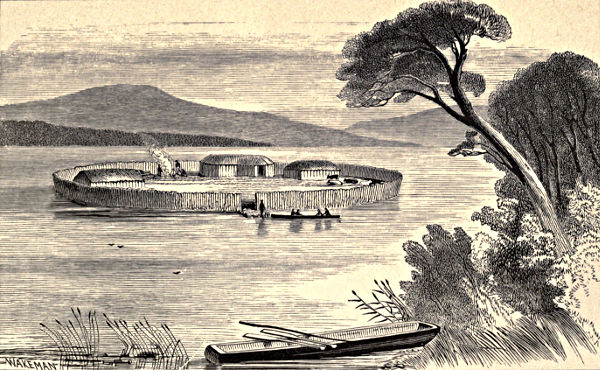
Illustration of (crannog)

=== Stone Age ===
Mesolithic hunter-gatherers may have frequented Lough Scur sometime c. 8,000 – c. 4000BC. (Note: The Mesolithic period began about 11,660 years BP ending with the introduction of farming.) Archaeological finds from Lough Scur include five Lithic flakes, a polished shale axe, a dolerite axe roughout, and a piece of leather under a dugout canoe. (Note: The term "roughout" means a work produced in rough or preliminary form.) The leather and canoe are not dated, but the flakes are probably Mesolithic.

Raftery (1957) claimed small Stone Age crannogs were observed at Lough Scur. The pre-Bronze Age material were described as flat, circular sites of stones, 6-10m in diameter and 400 cm above the lake mud. The interiors often consisted of brushwood, irregularly sized stones and sometimes horizontal timbers, some charred. Charred animal bones were found on the surface, indicating swine (wild boar, domestic pig) and oxen were part of the diet.

=== Bronze Age ===
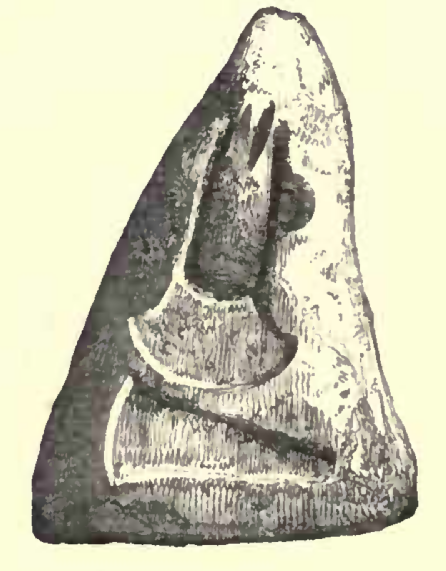
Stone Mould recovered from Lough-Scur Crannog

There was a Bronze Age human settlement at Lough-Scur c. 4,000 – c. 2,500BC. The "Lough-Scur Stone Mould" is a triangular coarse block of white sandstone found on the Lough-Scur crannog, bearing matrices for casting Copper and Bronze flat axes or spear-heads, and containing three moulds, one flat axe and one looped Palstave on obverse, with one flat axe on reverse. These were fashioned before the lake dwellers became familiar with the use of Iron sourced from Sliabh an Iarainn for example. The illustration shows the side with moulds for a plain Celt (tool) 7.5cm long and for a Celt 10cm long with cross strop and ring. The mould is part of the Royal Irish Academy's Collection.

=== Iron Age ===
Lough Scur contains five or six crannogs (artificial lake dwellings). Pre-Celtic archaeological remains from Lough Scur are preserved by the Royal Irish Academy museum and National Museum of Ireland-

- Five Lithic flakes, shale axe, dolerite axe roughout, piece of leather. (Note: The Lough Scur canoe was probably destroyed. Wilde (1861) complained of the poor preservation of dugout boat discoveries, noting many had been broken up for firewood since their recovery.)
- The Lough-Scur Stone Mould.
- The Lough-Scur Quern-stone, perhaps the largest example in Ireland, discovered on the crannog.
- The Kiltubrid Shield discovered on Kiltubrid townland nearby Lough Scur.
- The Keshcarrigan Bowl discovered in the canal between Lough Scur and Lough Marrave.
- Approximately one cask of bones found on Lough Scur crannog.

=== Aghascur Druid's Altar ===
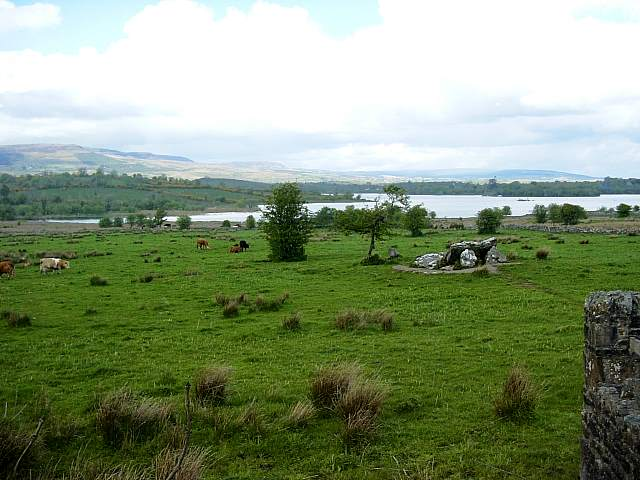
Aghascur, Lough Scur at back.

An ancient stone monument, probably a Druids Altar, is prominently located 400 yards south of the lake in a sloping pasture anciently named Irish: Aghascur, meaning 'field of the Scur'. Set against the spectacular backdrop of Lough Scur and Slieve Anierin, it is marked "Dermot and Grania's Bed" on some maps. Although two erect stones at the south have certainly been artificially set upright, this anomalous monument is extremely doubtful and, on the evidence, cannot be accepted as a megalithic tomb, but rather an attempt to split a rock outcrop from underlying bedrock. (Note: Aghascur ('field of the camp' according to O'Donovan) is marked as Lough Scur ('lake of the camp') on modern maps. It is possible O'Connor of Connacht maintained his regiment at Aghascur ('field of the camp') c. 1265AD to defend the Conmaicne of south Leitrim from Norman conquest.) It may have been a Druids altar before Christianity. There is also a Cist located here.

=== Castle O'Connor ===
In 1265AD, Aedh mac Felim Ó Conchobair constructed a fortified "castle" at Loch Scur. Defending the Conmhaicne of Muintir Eolais from Norman conquest was a military objective, and in 1270AD his Lough Scur regiment and Conmhaicne forces both participated in the decisive Battle of Áth an Chip.

=== Castle of Lough Scur ===
Crannogs occurred at Lough Scur through the Middle Ages, and the Irish Annals allude to a fortified crannog at Lough Scur.

- "1346: Four sons of Cathal, son of Mag Raghnaill the Blind-eye, were taken prisoners on Loch-in-sguir by Concobur Mag Raghnaill. And Tomaltach Mag Raghnaill took them with him to Caisel-Coscraigh and they were killed there, the saddest tale that was done in that time.
- "1390: Manus O'Rourke, who had been imprisoned by O'Reilly in the castle of Lough Oughter, made his escape from it, and went to the castle of Lough-an Scuir; but the Clann-Murtough, being informed of this by his betrayers, they slew him as he was coming ashore out of a cot.

In the 19th century, a portion of a heavy oak-frame, with mortices and cheeks cut into it, was found on a crannog here.

=== Castle Sean ===
In 1570 Sean Reynolds built a 'Castle' at Gowly townland on a peninsula called Castle Island. (Note: The suggestion by Grose Castle Sean was erected by O’Rourke, is unfounded.) Castle John was three stories high and surrounded by good rock land. Between c. 1570 – c. 1729 Castle Sean was residence to Sean Reynolds (d. 1619), Humphrey his son (d. 1661), Sean his grandson (captured and probably executed during the Irish Rebellion of 1641) and another grandson James (d. 1729), (Note: James's son, George Nugent Reynolds Senior, who probably never lived at Castle Sean, was shot and killed by Robert Keon on the morning of October 16, 1786. Keon was tried and executed in 1788 for murder.) who probably abandoned the Castle during his lifetime. Dilapidated ruins of Castle Sean (Irish: Caisleán Seóin) remain today, but are not preserved as national monument, tourist, or heritage site. Some of the building collapsed c. 1908 but was repaired by a heritage preservation society.

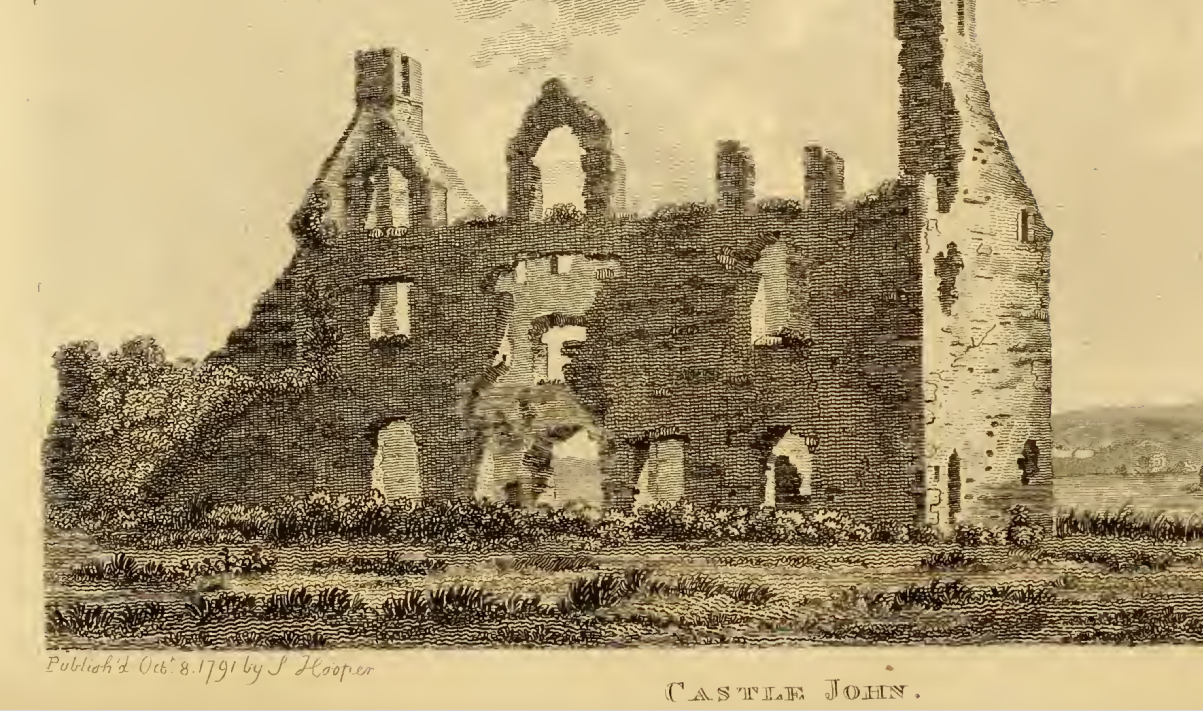
Castle Sean c. 1791

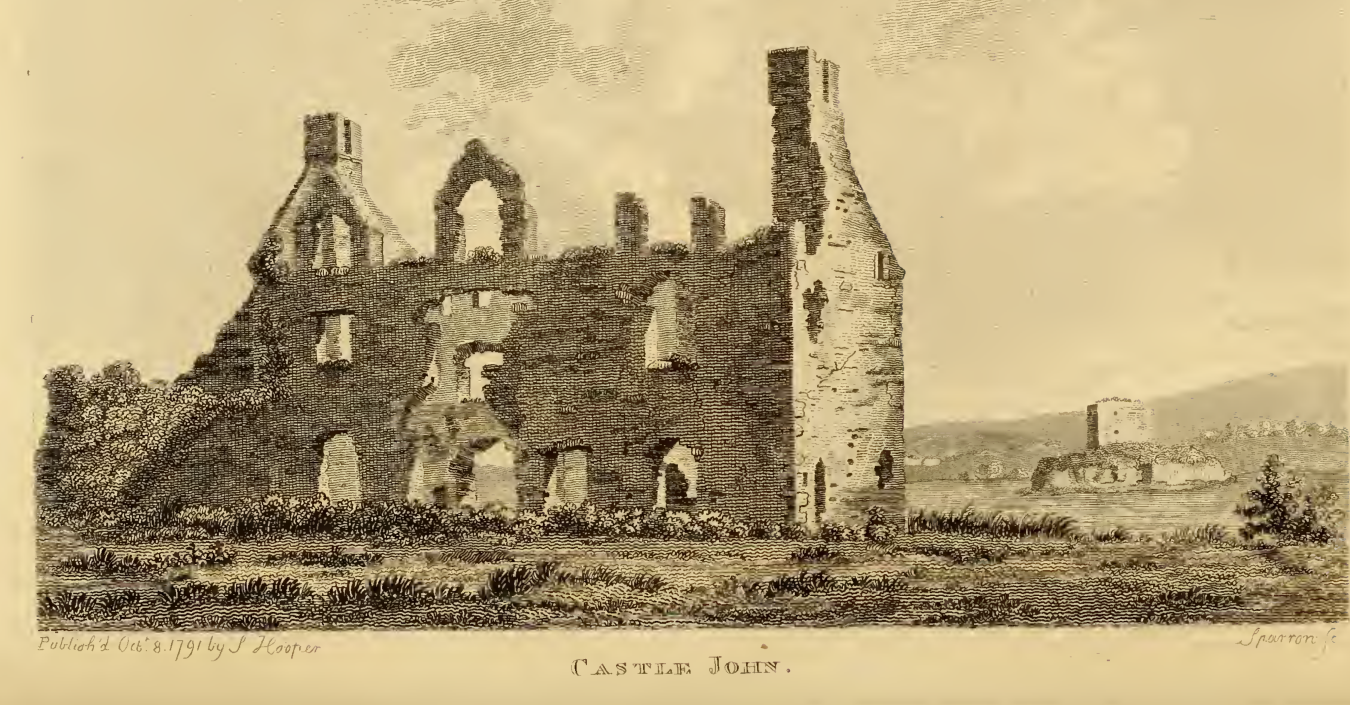
Castle & Jail view

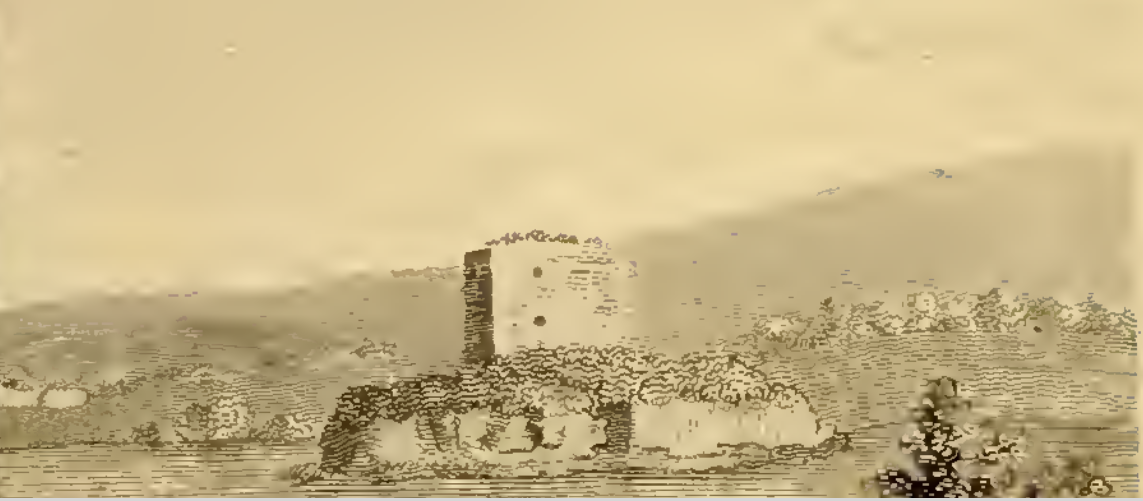
Jail Island c. 1791

=== Prison Island ===
On 6 April 1605, Sean and his son Humphrey were appointed gaoler of county Leitrim. They constructed a 'prison' on 'Jail island' (Irish: Oileán an phríosúin) in Lough Scur. The jail cells were small with holes about six inches in diameter for air. Tradition recalls many people being hanged on the island, and that Sean was killed by a soldier from Longford avenging his sister's death there. Prison Island was abandoned once Carrick-on-Shannon gaol became established. Dilapidated ruins of the prison remain but are not preserved for heritage.

=== Metalworking tradition ===
A tradition of metalworking at Lough Scur is recorded. Five Metalsmiths from "Lougheskure" obtained grants of pardons in the Elizabethan Fiants c. 1583 – c. 1586AD.

- Gilla Gruma O'Flynn.
- Charles O'Flynn.
- Toole O'Fenane.
- Teige oge O'Fonan and Eoin O'Finan, named as Tinker metal workers.

=== Book of Lough Scur ===
In the early 20th century, a book or manuscript titled the "Book of Lough Scur", on the Reynolds family, supposedly existed in the library of an unidentified deceased person living near Keshcarrigan, County Leitrim.

"Book of LoughScur - A book or manuscript bearing this title, on the Reynolds family (ancient name MacRannal or Magrannal), County Leitrim, was heard of about three years ago in the neighbourhood of Keshcarrigan, County Leitrim, as having been seen in the library of a gentleman who had died a little while previously; but his name was not ascertained. Materials are being collected for a history of the Reynolds family, and information regarding this book or the loan of it would be much appreciated. [June 1st 1905]".

[text: query from [Henry F. Reynolds, 93, Denbigh Street, S.W.]

"I have never heard of the 'Book of Lough- scur,' but if it be in existence, it will probably be found either in Trinity College or the Royal Irish Academy, Dublin." [21 Oct 1905]

[text: response from [Baron Seton of Andria]

== See also ==
- List of loughs in Ireland
- The Keshcarrigan Bowl
- Kiltubrid Shield

== References and notes ==
=== Sources ===
- Joyce, Patrick Weston (1883). The Geography of the Counties of Ireland. p. 127.
- anglingireland. "Lough Scur". Inland Fisheries Ireland.
- "Loch an Scoir". pp. Archival records.
- Meehan, Joseph (1906). "Notes on the Mac Rannals of Leitrim and their Country". Journal of the Royal Society of Antiquaries of Ireland: 144–145.
- Golden, Anne (2007). The Shannon-Erne Navigation Architectural, Engineering and Industrial Heritage 2007 (PDF) (Report). Commissioned by Waterways Ireland and carried out by Headland Archaeology Ltd.
- O'Laughlin, Michael C. (2002). The Book of Irish Families, Great & Small. Vol. 1 of Families of Ireland Series. Contributor: Irish Genealogical Foundation (US) (illustrated, digital ed.). Irish Roots Cafe. ISBN 978-0940134096.
- Inland Fisheries Ireland (2014). The Diet of Pike in Irish Watercourses (Report) (Layman's Report, Trophic flexibility and diet of pike (Esox lucius L.) in Ireland ed.).
- National Monuments Service (2009). Leitrim (PDF) (Report). Vol. National Monuments in State Care: Ownership & Guardianship. Environment, Heritage and Local Government.
- iRBD (2008). Environmental Report, North Western iRBD (PDF) (Report). Vol. Strategic Environmental Assessment for the Water Framework Directive River Basin Management Plans and Programmes of Measures. North Western International river basin district (INTERREG).
- Pedreschi, D.; Kelly-Quinn, M.; Caffrey, J; O'Grady, M.; Mariani, S.; Phillimore, A. (2014), "Genetic structure of pike (Esox lucius) reveals a complex and previously unrecognized colonization history of Ireland", Journal of Biogeography, 41 (3), Journal of Biogeography, 41(3), 548–560.: 548–560, doi:10.1111/jbi.12220, PMC 4238397, PMID 25435649
- Haug, Per Ivar (2011). Gazetteer of Ireland. Vol. Til Opplysning, A series of papers from the University Library in Trondheim, Nummer 16 (Second ed.). Hommelvik: UBiT, Universitetsbiblioteket i Trondheim.
- discoverireland.ie (2017). "Coarse Angling Keshcarrigan".
- Clenaghan, Conor; Clinton, Frank; Crowe, Matthew (2005). Phosphorus Regulations National Implementation Report (PDF) (Report). Environmental Protection Agency, Office of Environmental Enforcement.
- Minchin; Lucy; Sullivan (2002). Monitoring of zebra mussels in the Shannon-Boyle navigation, other navigable regions and principal Irish lakes, 2000 & 2001.* (PDF) (Report). Vol. Marine Environment and Health Series, No. 5, 2002. Marine Institute.
- Joyce, P. W. (Patrick Weston) (1913). Irish names of places (PDF). Vol. v.3. Dublin : Phoenix.
- Rodelez, Paul (2014). Ironworking in late medieval Ireland, c. AD. 1200 to 1600 (Thesis). hdl:10468/1944.
- MacMahon, John (1845). Correspondance relative to the navigation between Lough Erne and the River Shannon (Report). Vol. Parliamentary Papers, House of Commons and Command, Volume 45 (Digitized 2006 from original in Harvard University ed.). H.M. Stationery Office.
- Munro, Robert (1890). The lake-dwellings of Europe: being the Rhind lectures in archaeology for 1888 (PDF). London [etc.]: Cassell & company, limited.
- White, William (1907). Notes and Queries. Vol. Tenth series, Vol. VII (Number 158 ed.). Oxford University Press.
- Grose, Francis (1795). The antiquities of Ireland (PDF). Vol. 2. Printed for S. Hooper.
- O'Sullivan, Aidan (2004). The social and Ideological role of Crannogs in Early Medieval Ireland (PDF) (Thesis) (PhD. Thesis ed.). Department of Modern History, National University of Ireland, Manooth.
- Dalton, John P. (1923). "Breifne before the Ui-Bruin" (PDF). The Breifny Antiquarian Society's Journal. II (I). Cavan: The Anglo Celt, Ltd. Printing Works: 57–82.
- Driscoll, Killian (2006). The early prehistory in the west of Ireland: Investigations into the social archaeology of the Mesolithic, west of the Shannon, Ireland (PDF) (Thesis) (M.Litt. Thesis ed.). Department of Archaeology, National University of Ireland, Galway.
- Wood-Martin, W. G. (William Gregory) (1886). The lake dwellings of Ireland: or, Ancient lacustrine habitations of Erin, commonly called crannogs (PDF). Dublin : Hodges, Figgis & co.; [etc., etc.]
- De Valera, Ruaidhri; O'Nuallain, Sean (1972). Survey of the Megalithic Tombs of Ireland (PDF). Vol. III. Dublin: Published by the Stationery office.
- Callander, J. Graham (1904). Stone mould for casting flat bronze axes (PDF). Vol. Proceedings of the Society. pp. 487–505.
- Fredengren, Christina (2013). Crannogs (PDF) (Report). Stockholm University.
- British Museum (1904). A guide to the antiquities of the Bronze Age (PDF). Dept. of British and Mediaeval Antiquities: [Oxford] Trustees of the B.M.
- Coffey, George (1913). The Bronze Age in Ireland (PDF). Dublin, Hodges, Figgis, & co., limited; [etc., etc. ].
- McCabe, A. Marshall (2008). Glacial Geology and Geomorphology: The Landscapes of Ireland (illustrated ed.). Dunedin. ISBN 978-1903765876.
- Wilde, William (March 1854). "The food of the Irish, part II". Dublin University Magazine: A Literary and Philosophic Review. Vol. 43, no. 255. Curry. pp. 317–333.
- Mulvany, W. T.; Fraser, William; Roberts, Samuel; Mulvany, Thomas J.; O'Flaherty, John (1852). Appendix No. V: Notices of Antiquities Presented to the Royal Irish Academy by W. T. Mulvany, Esq., M. R. I. A., on the Part of the Commissioners of Public Works. Proceedings of the Royal Irish Academy (Report). Vol. 5 (1850 - 1853). Royal Irish Academy. pp. xxxi–lxvi. JSTOR 20489812.
- O'Drisceoil, C; Leenane, M; Davis, S; Fitzgibbon, B; Teehan, M (2014). THE BLACK PIG'S DYKE REGIONAL PROJECT REPORT (PDF) (Report). Vol. 1 of 2. Archived from the original (PDF) on 18 February 2017.
- Moody, Theodore William (1976). Theodore William Moody; Francis X. Martin; Francis John Byrne; Art Cosgrove (eds.). A New History of Ireland: Prehistoric and early Ireland. Vol. 1 of A New History of Ireland: Prehistoric and Early Ireland, Ed. by Daibhi O Croinin, W. E. Vaughan (illustrated, reprint ed.). Oxford University Press. ISBN 978-0198217374.
- Rowley, Thomas (1937). "Legend of Lough Scurr" (Online ed.). Drumrane, Co. Leitrim: Duchas. pp. 268–269.
- Whelan, Thomas (1938). "Local ruins" (Online ed.). Rossy, Co. Leitrim: Duchas. pp. 384–5.
- An Clochar, Cara Droma Ruisc (1938). "Lough Scur" (Online ed.). Carrick-on-Shannon, Co. Leitrim: Duchas. p. 312.
- Leitrim Observer (1970). "Drumcong jamboree and dancing carnival". Leitrim Observer. Archived from the original on 2 February 2017.
- O'Donovan, John, ed. (1856). Annála Rioghachta Éireann. Annals of the Kingdom of Ireland by the Four Masters ... with a Translation and Copious Notes. 7 vols. Translated by O'Donovan (2nd ed.). Dublin: Royal Irish Academy. CELT editions. Full scans at Internet Archive: Vol. 1; Vol. 2; Vol. 3; Vol. 4; Vol. 5; Vol. 6; Indices.
- Bambury, Pádraig; Beechinor, Stephen (2003). "The Annals of Ulster" (Electronic edition compiled by the CELT Team (2003) ed.). CELT: Corpus of Electronic Texts: a project of University College Cork College Road, Cork, Ireland—http://www.ucc.ie/celt.
- Hazard, Benjamin (2012). "Annales Dominicani de Roscoman, 1163—1314: Introduction". Corpus of Electronic Texts Edition.
