= R686 road (Ireland) =

Road in Ireland

R686 road
- Bóthar R686
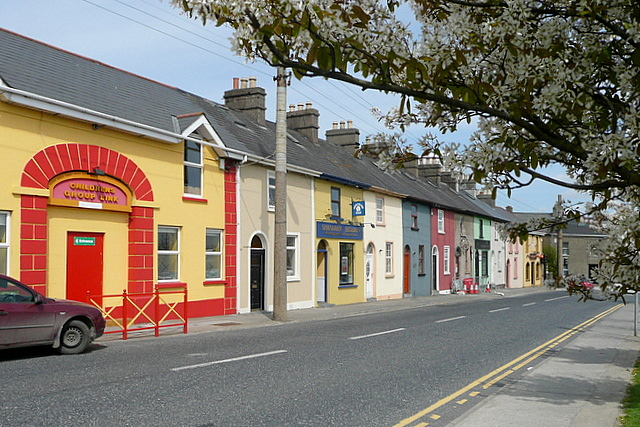
- Military Road, Waterford, on the R686

Major junctions
- From: R680 at Merchants Quay, Waterford

- To: R680 at Cork Road, Waterford

Location
- Country: Ireland

Highway system
- Roads in Ireland; Motorways; Primary; Secondary; Regional
← R685	→ R687

The R686 road is a regional road in Ireland, located in Waterford City. It runs roughly north–south, to the west of the inner city.

The route begins at the junction of the R680 at Merchants Quay and runs via Bridge Street, Summerhill, Military Road, Morrisson's Road, Cannon Street, Ashe Road, Inner Ring Road and rejoins the R680 at Kingsmeadow Roundabout on Cork Road, all in the city of Waterford.

== See also ==
- Roads in Ireland
