= List of aircraft of the Irish Air Corps =

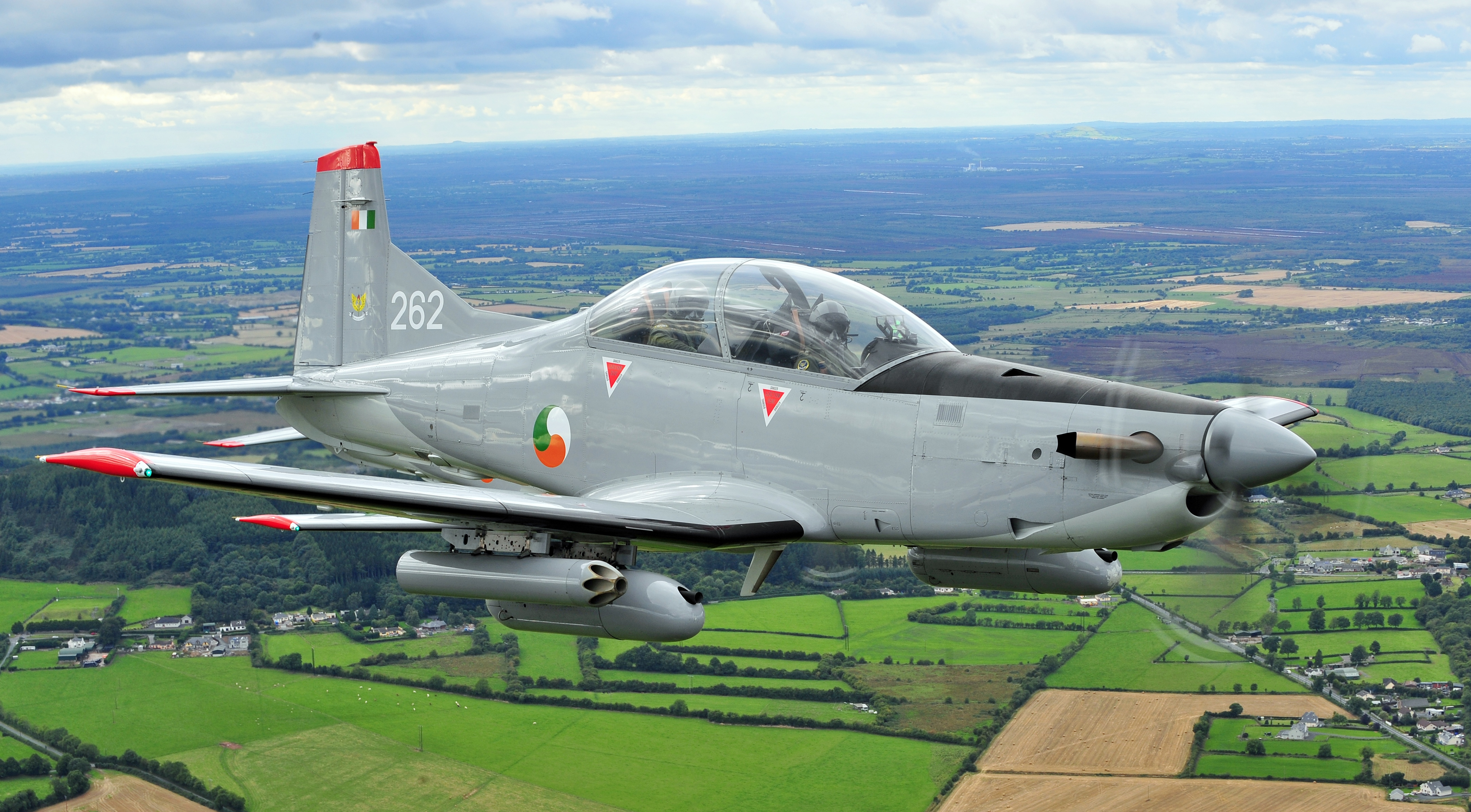
Air Corps PC-9 #262

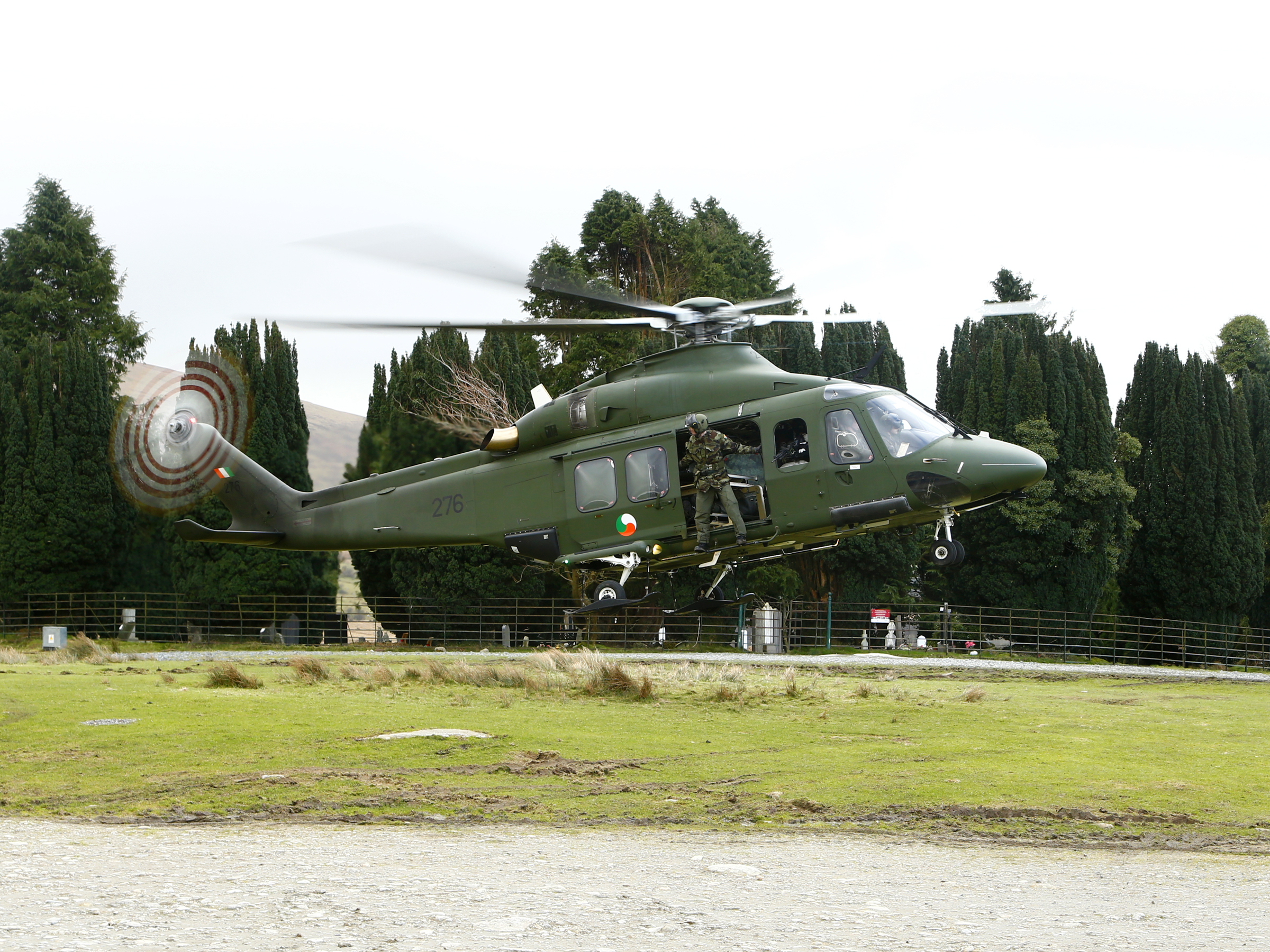
Air Corps AW139 #276

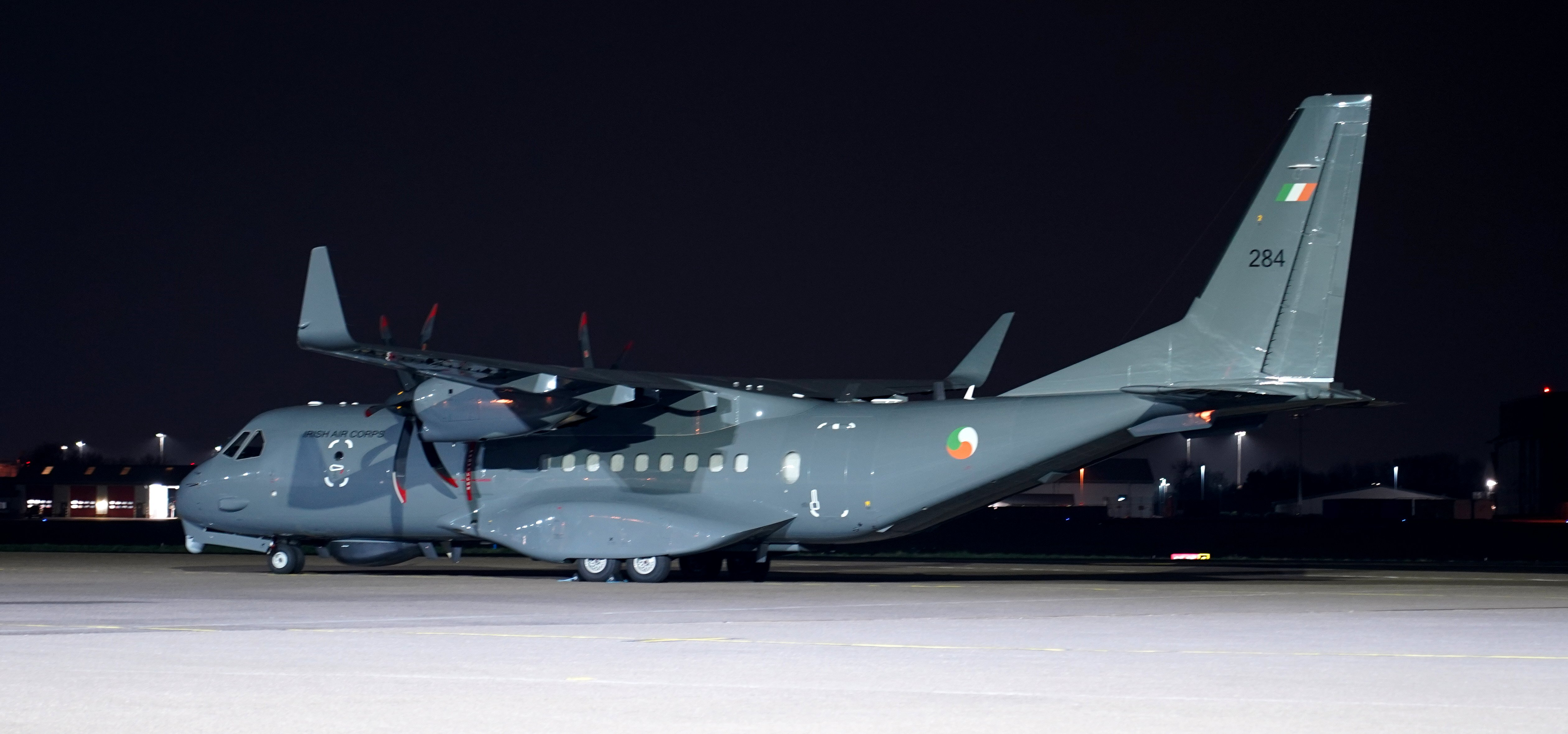
Air Corps C-295 #284

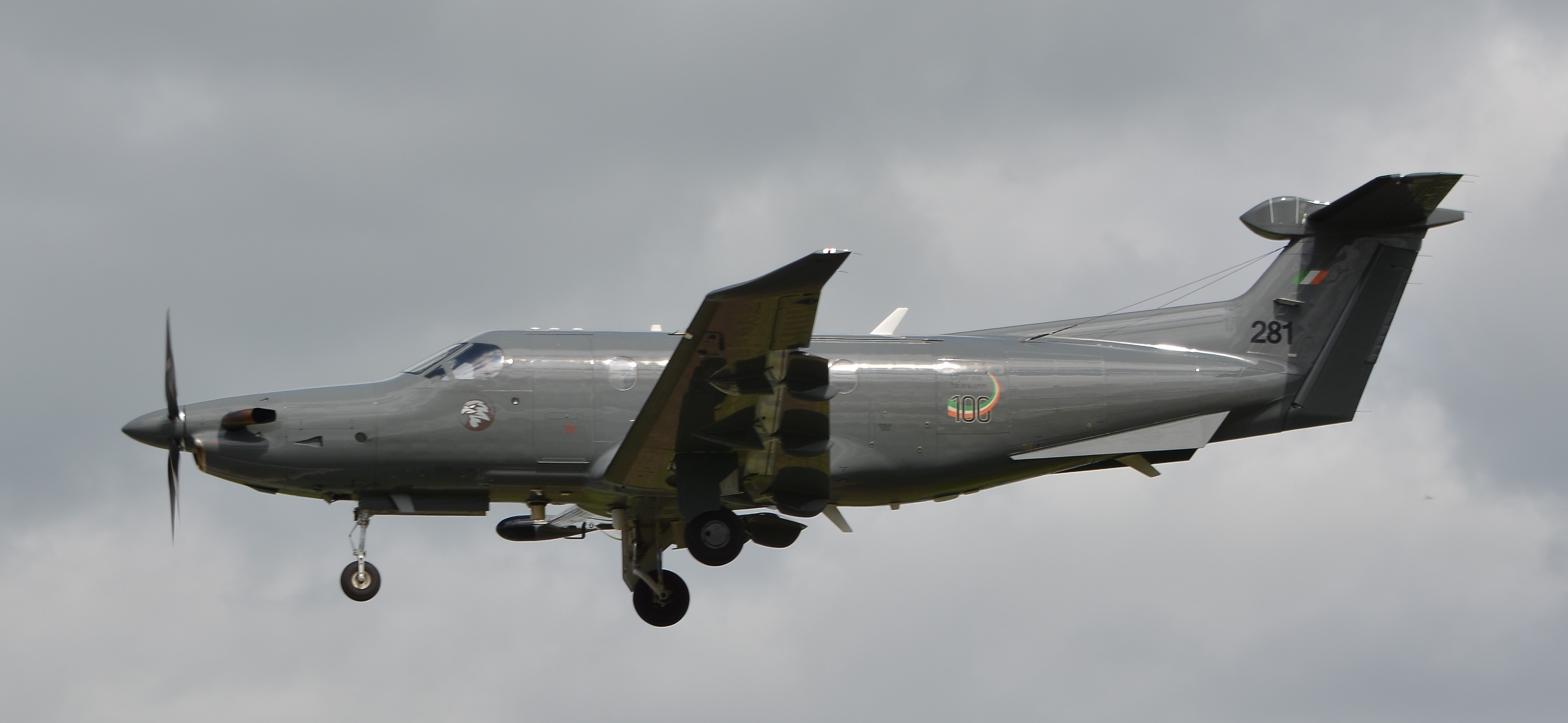
Air Corps PC-12 #281

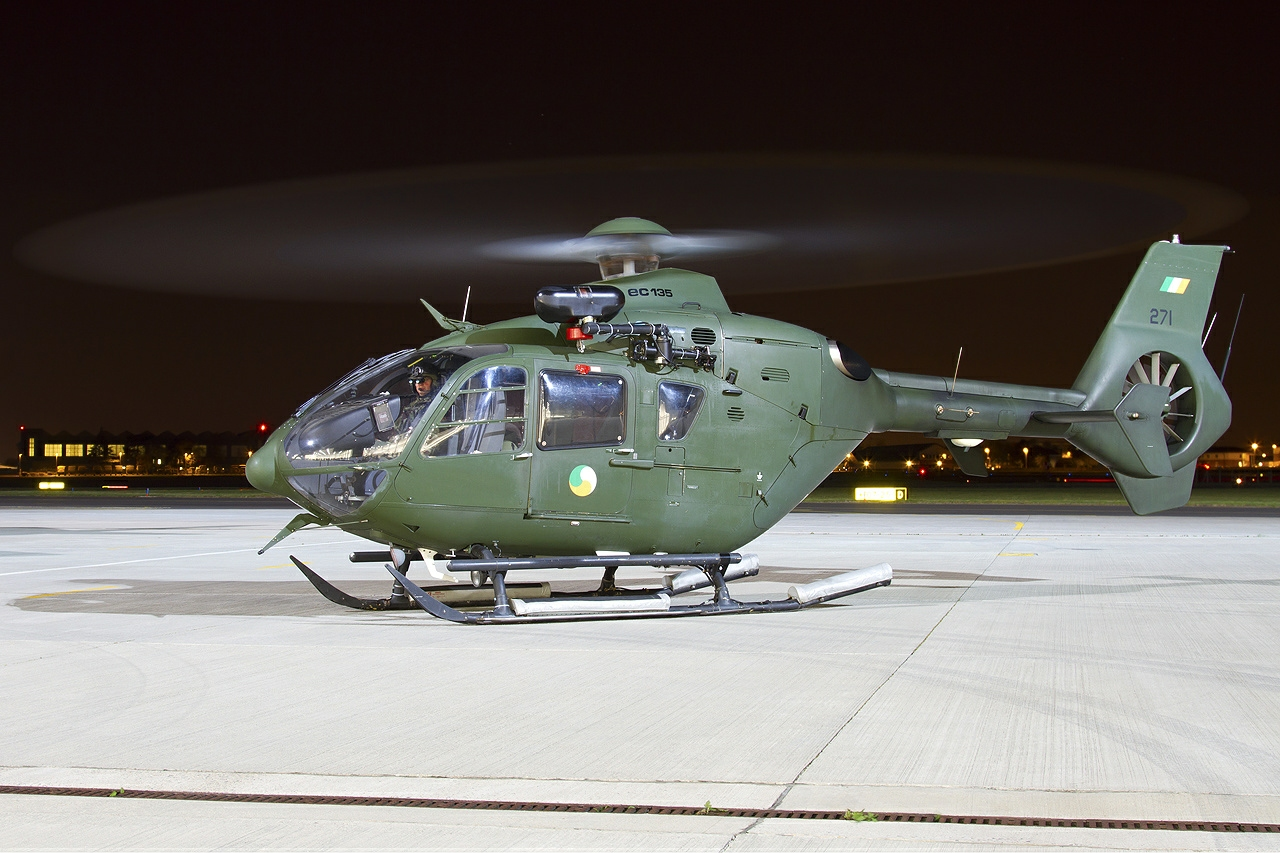
Air Corps EC-135 #271

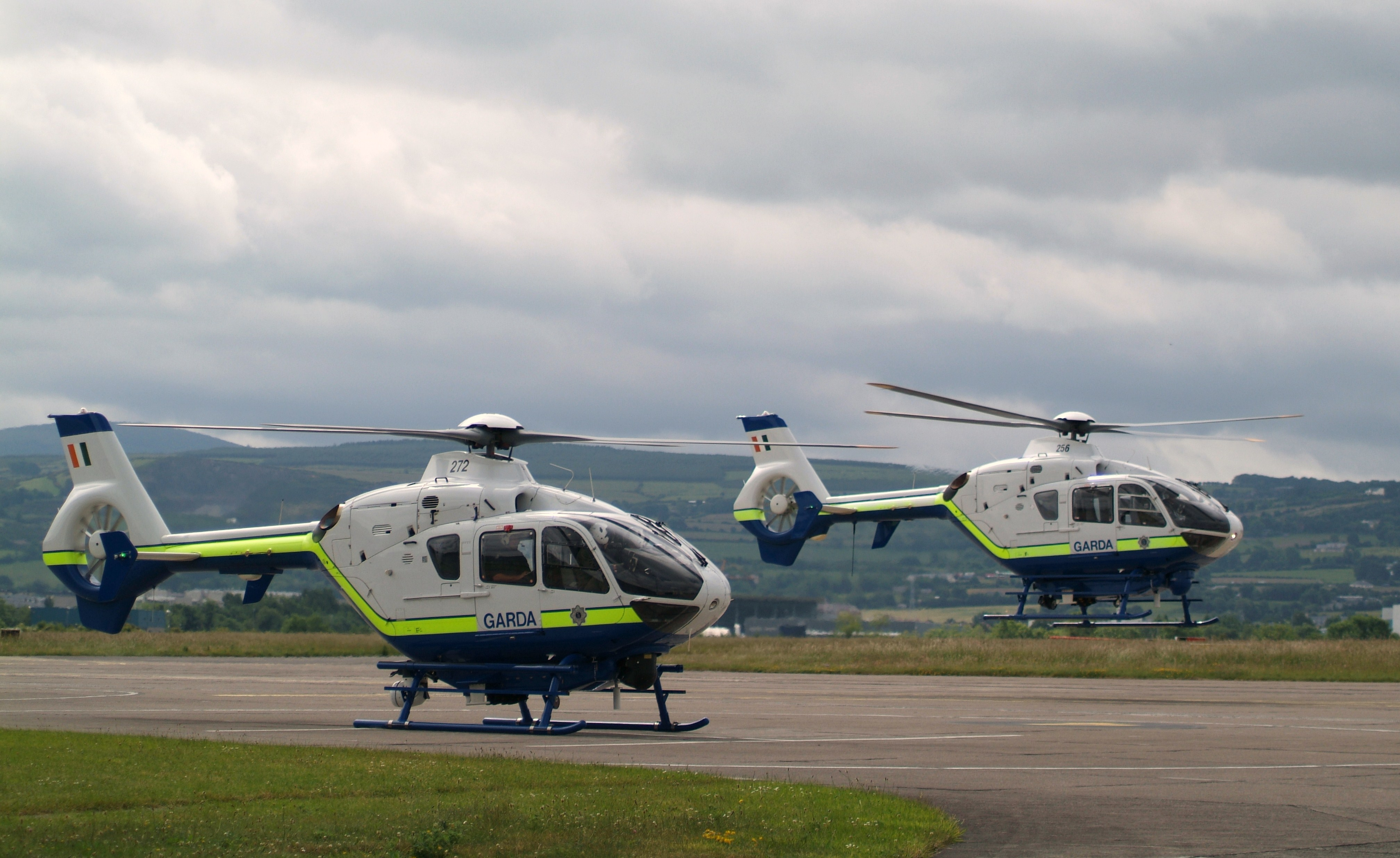
Garda EC-135 #256 & #272

This list identifies the military aircraft which are currently being operated, on order, or have formerly been operated by the Irish Air Corps.

== Current Irish military aircraft ==
Military aircraft currently in active service, or on order, with the Irish Air Corps are as follows:

Aircraft	Origin	Role	Variant	In service	Serial Nos	Entered service	Notes and references
Maritime surveillance
Airbus C295	Spain	Maritime patrol	C295W MSA	2	284-285	2023	
Reconnaissance
Pilatus PC-12	Switzerland	ISTAR	PC-12NG "Spectre"	3	281-283	2020	
Transport
Pilatus PC-12	Switzerland	Utility	PC-12NG	1	280	2020	
Airbus C295	Spain	Transport	C295W	1	286	2025	
Dassault Falcon 6X	France	Executive transport		1	290	2025	
Helicopter
Eurocopter EC135	Germany	Utility/Trainer	EC135 P2	2	270-271	2005	To be replaced by Airbus H145M, four of which were order in 2024 for expected delivery from 2027.
AgustaWestland AW139	Italy	Utility		6	274-279	2006	Can be armed.
Trainer
Pilatus PC-9	Switzerland	Trainer / CAS	PC-9M	8	260-267, 269	2004	Serial Nos #268 and #269 were reserved for PC-9s which were not ordered. #269 arrived, in 2017, as an attrition replacement for #265 (#265 crashed in 2009). Can be armed.
Police air support
Flown for the Garda Air Support Unit (GASU).
DHC-6 Twin Otter	Canada	Police air support	Guardian 400	1	288	2025	
Eurocopter EC135	Germany	Police air support	EC135 T2	2	256, 272	2003	To be replaced by Airbus H145, two of which were ordered in 2023 for expected delivery during 2026.

== Retired Irish military aircraft ==
With the closure of the Air Corps Museum in 2024, several of its aircraft and other exhibits were transferred to the Shannon Aviation Museum. A De Havilland Vampire and a Miles Magister are on display in the National Museum in Collins Barracks (Dublin).

The following aircraft once served with the Irish Air Corps:

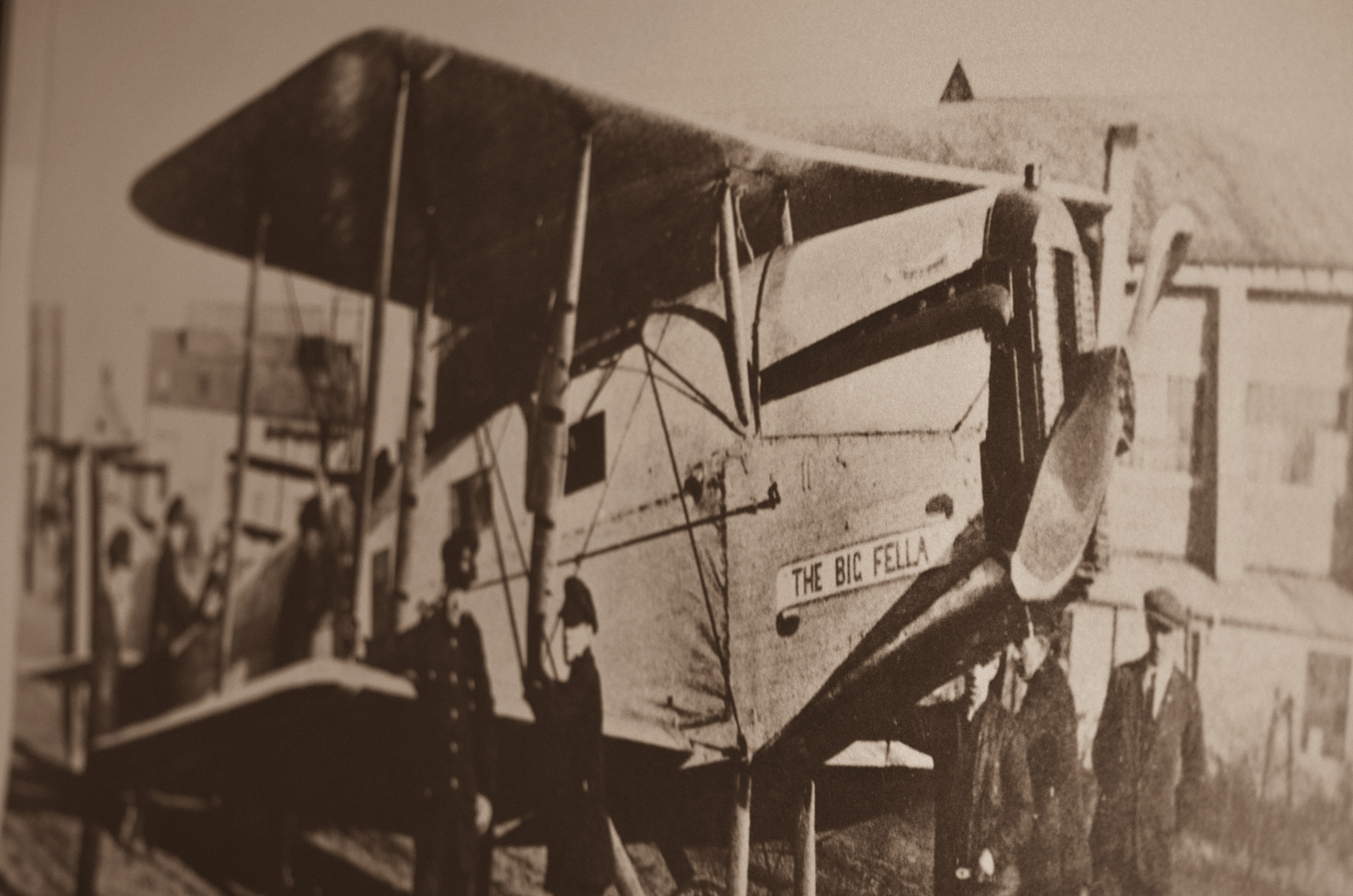
Martinsyde Type A "Big Fella"

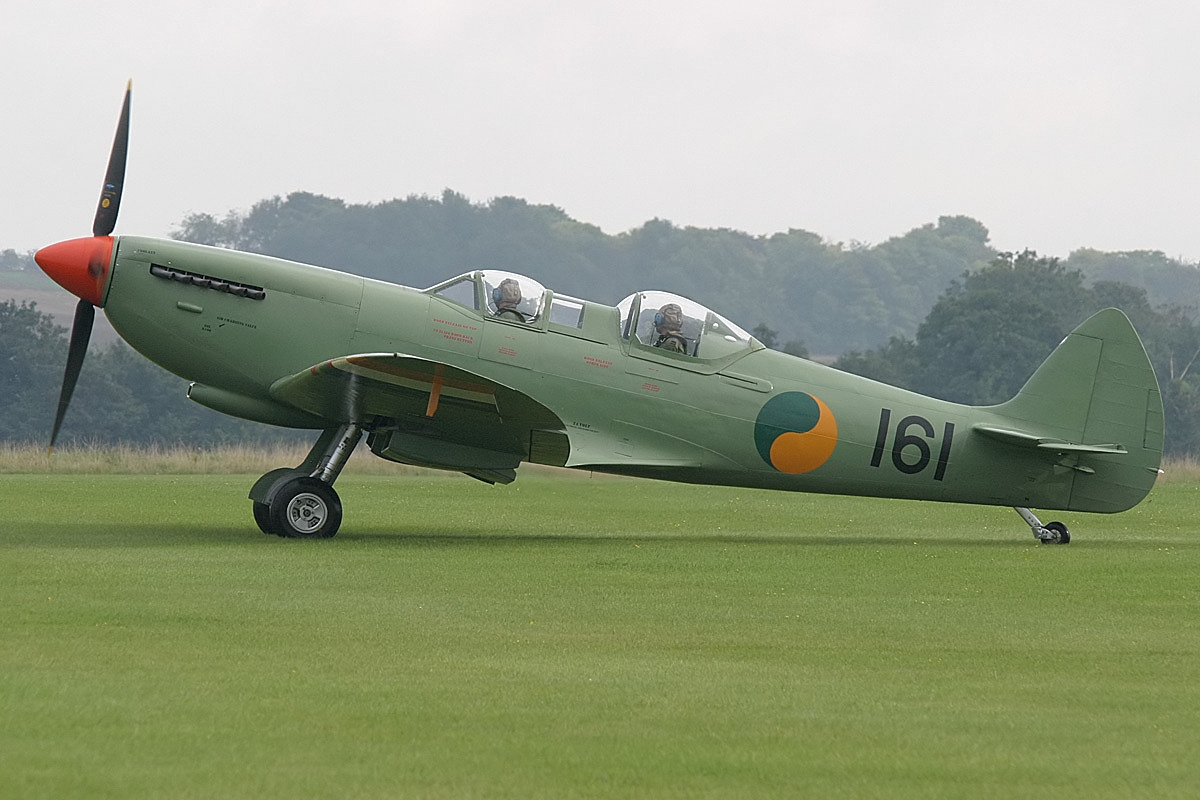
Air Corps Spitfire T.9 #161

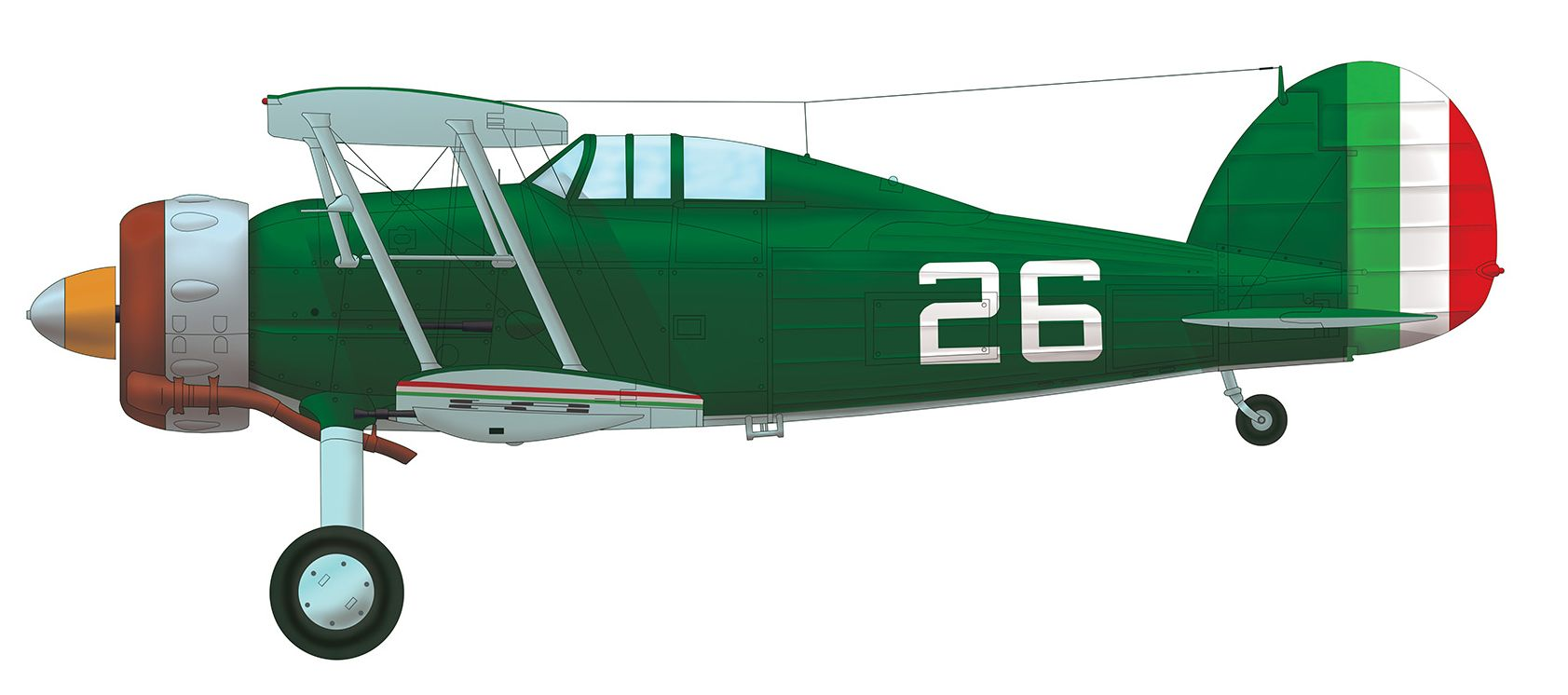
Air Corps Gloster Gladiator

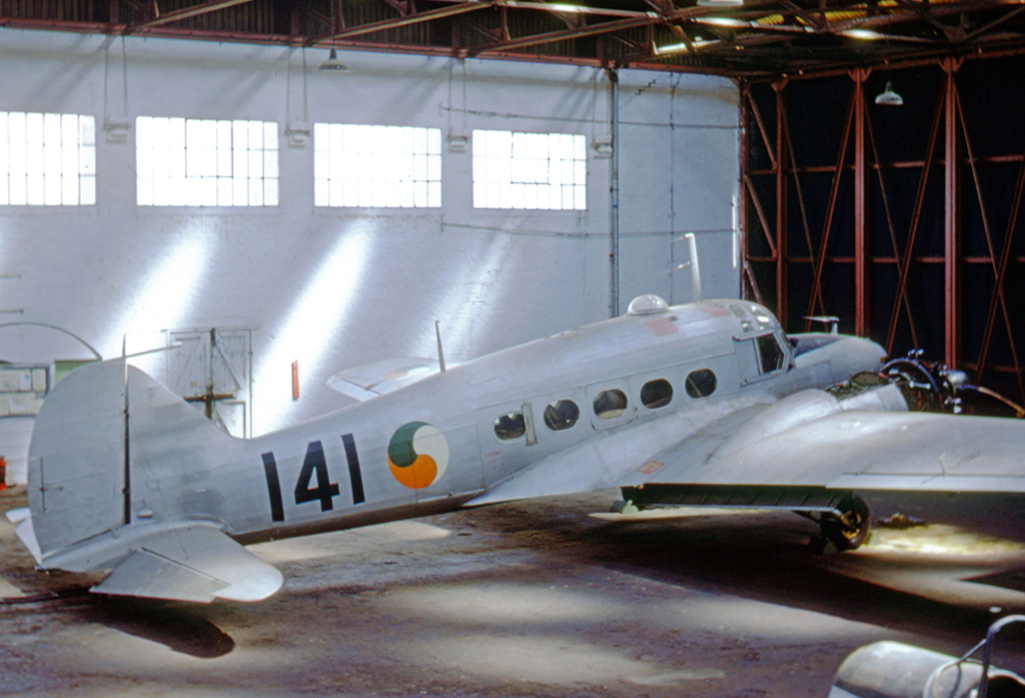
Air Corps Anson #141

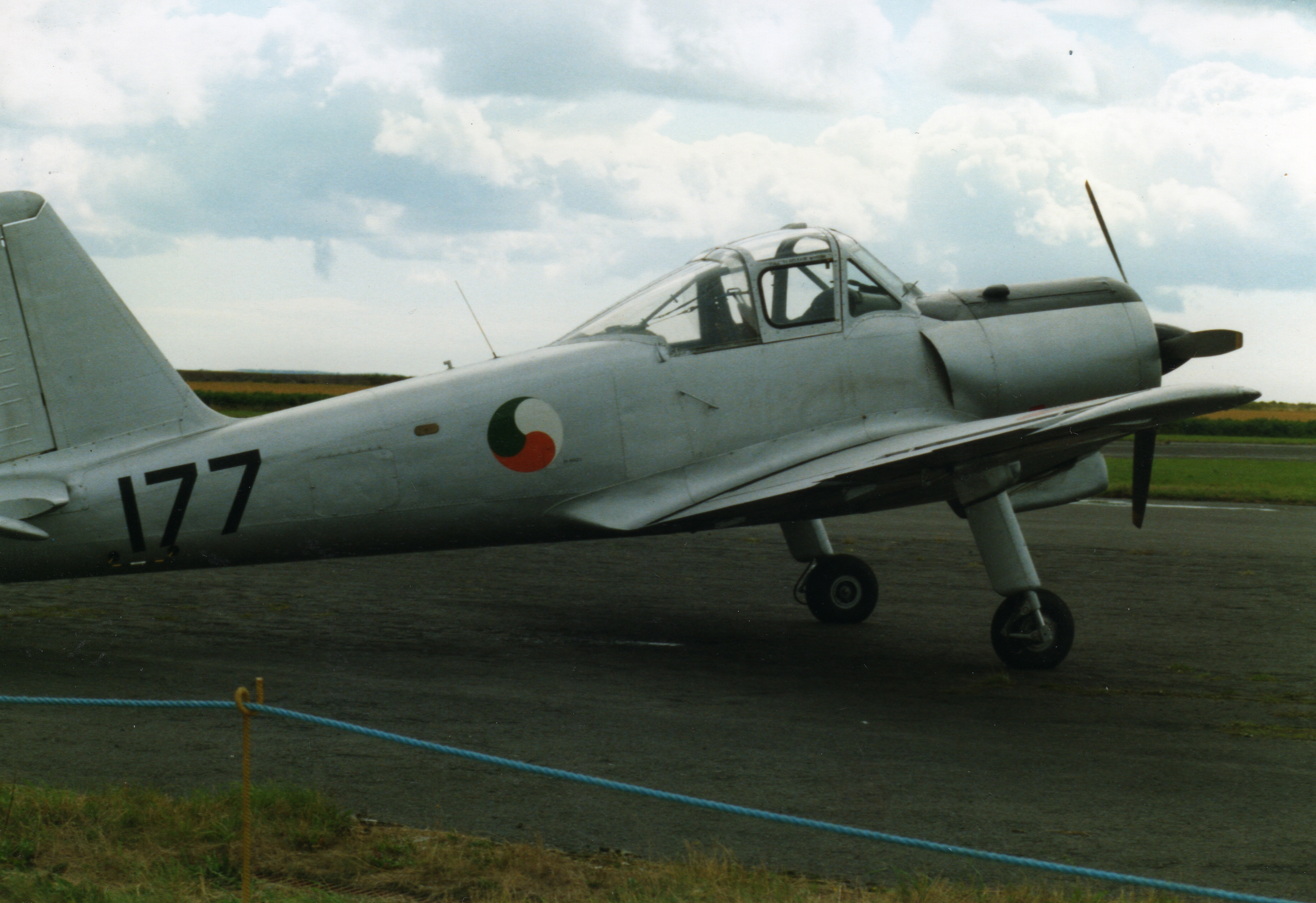
Air Corps Percival Provost Mk 51 #177

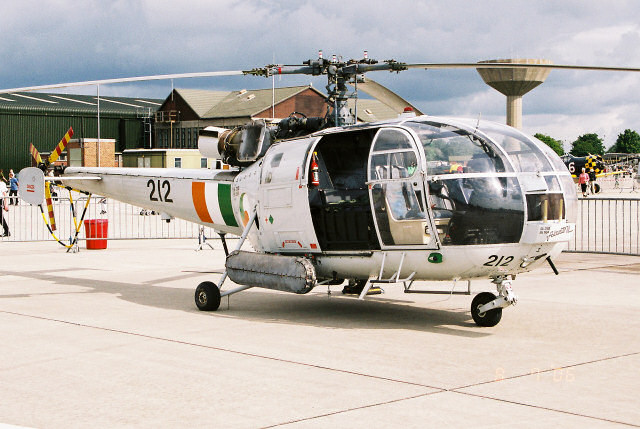
Air Corps Alouette III #212

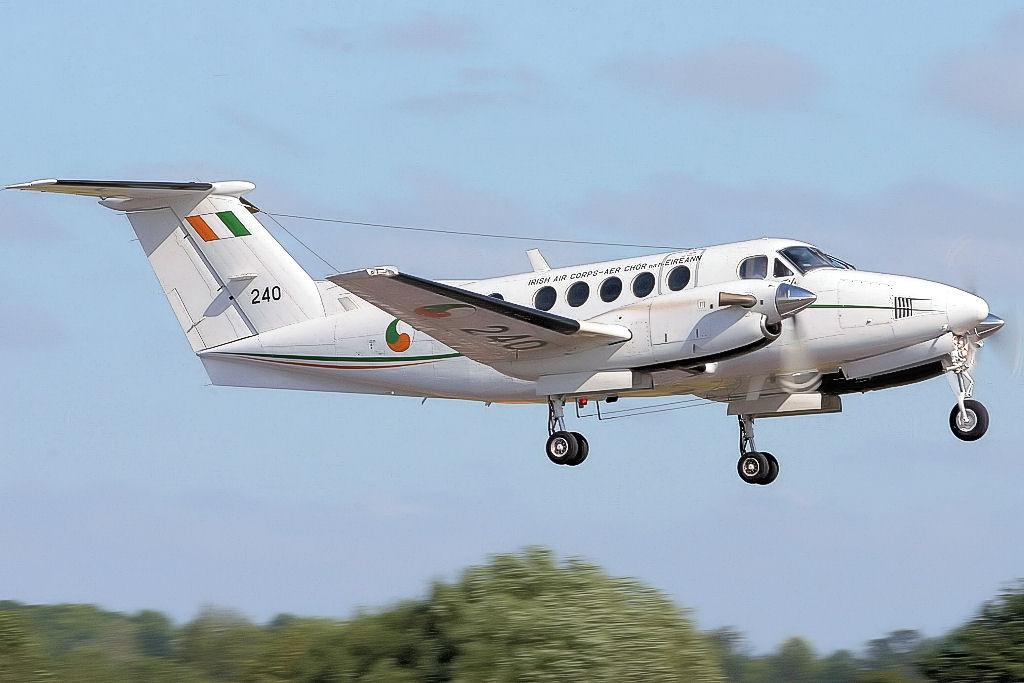
Air Corps Beechcraft #240

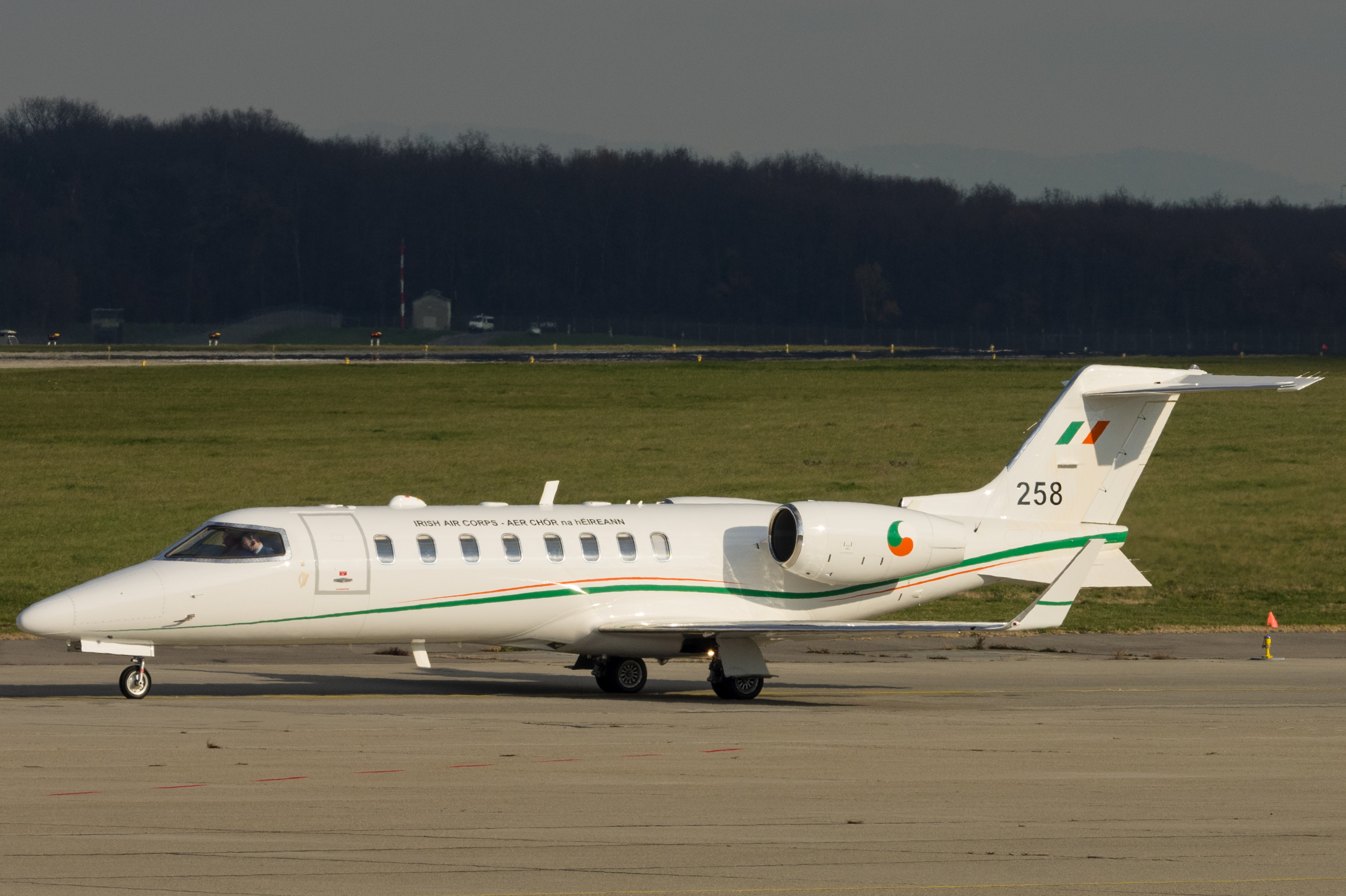
Air Corps Learjet #258

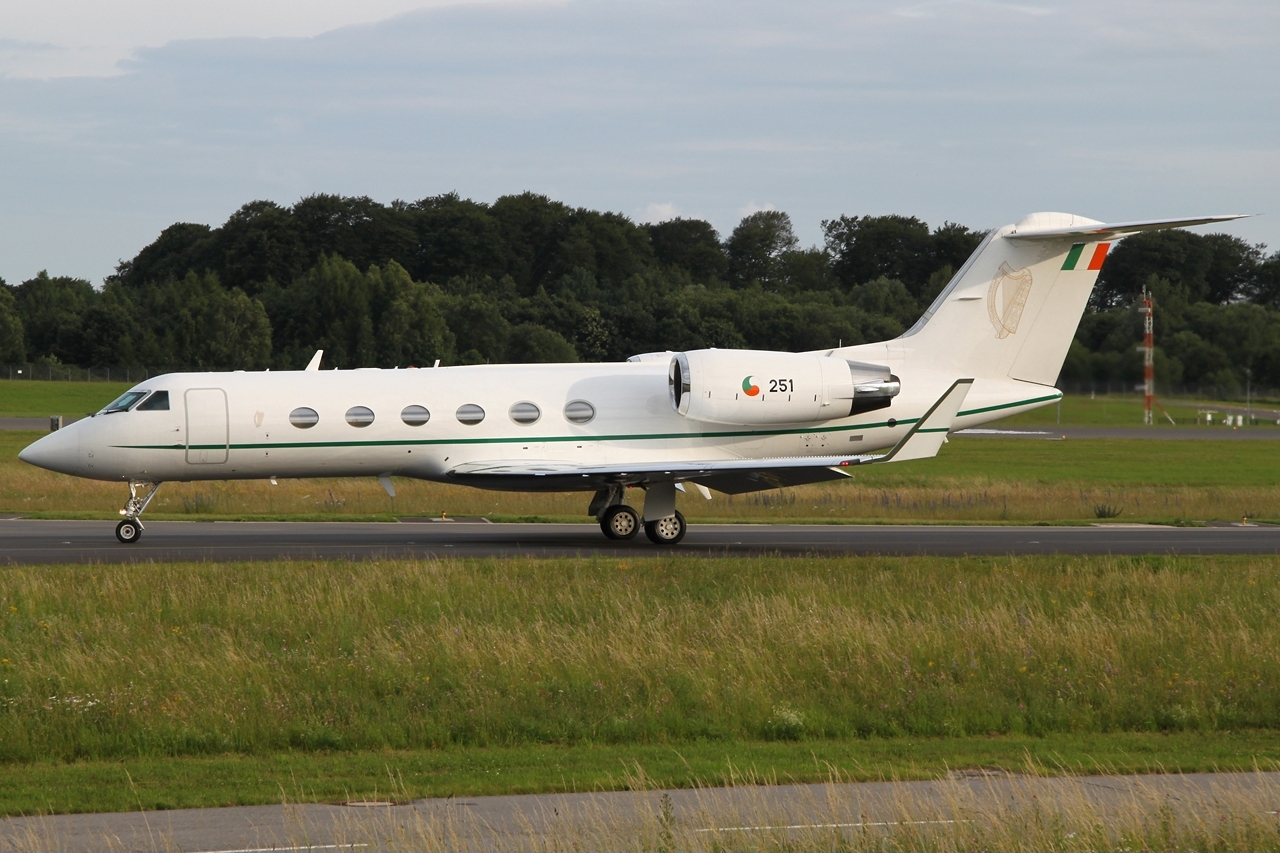
Air Corps Gulfstream #251

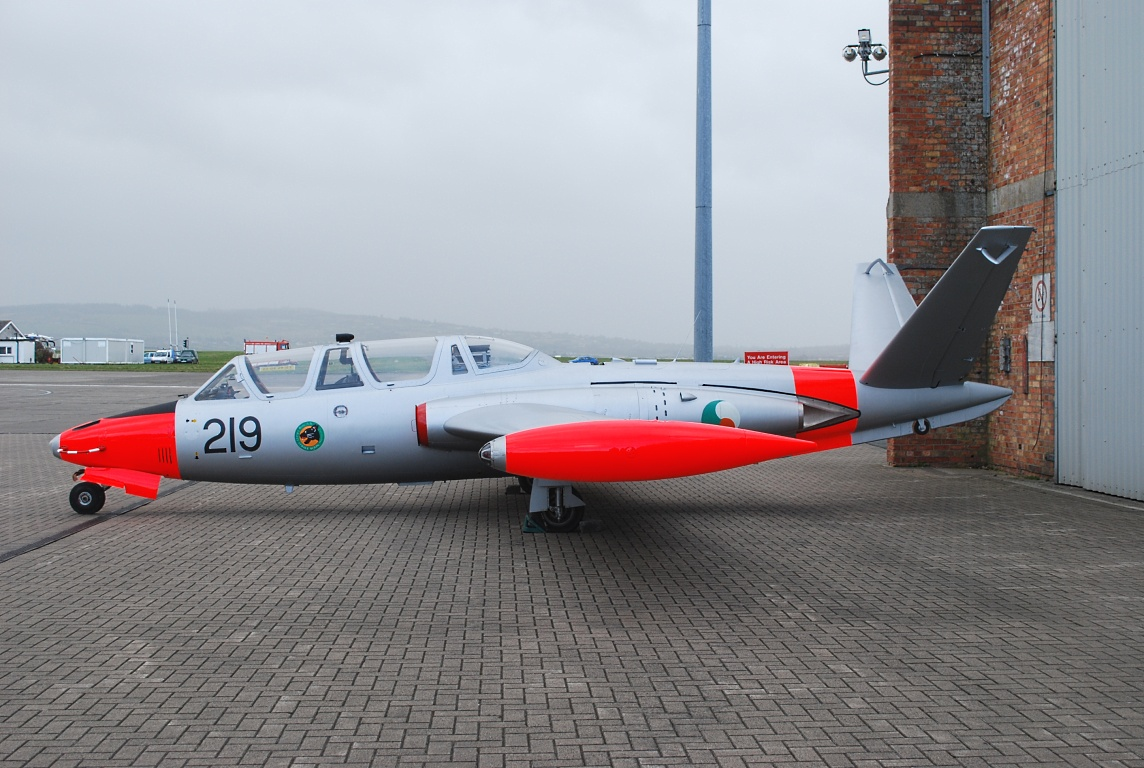
Air Corps Magister #219

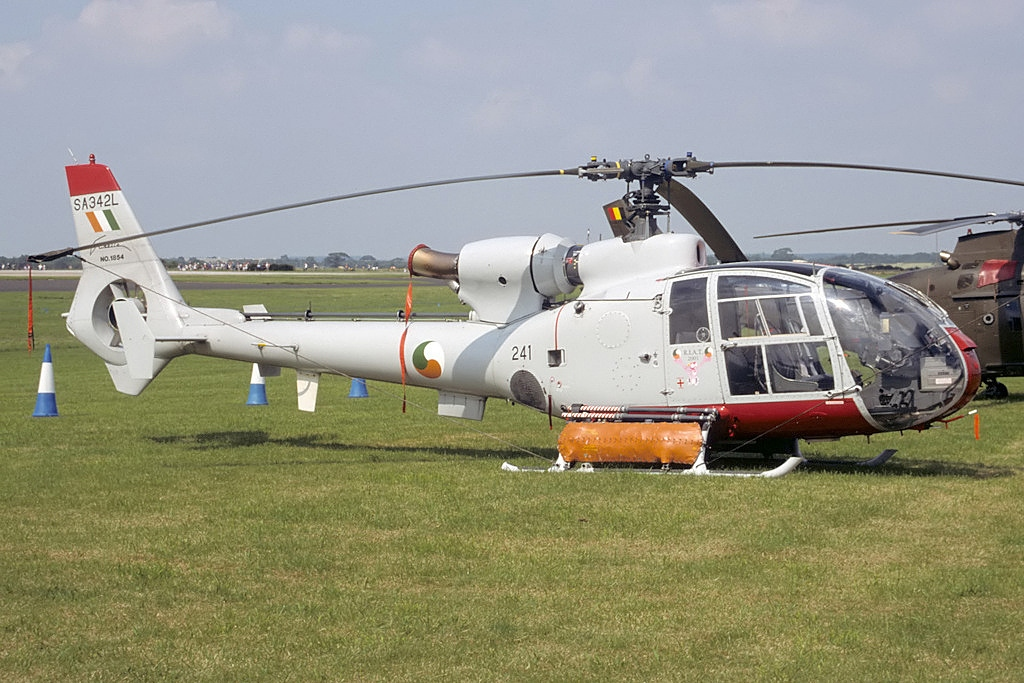
Air Corps Gazelle #241

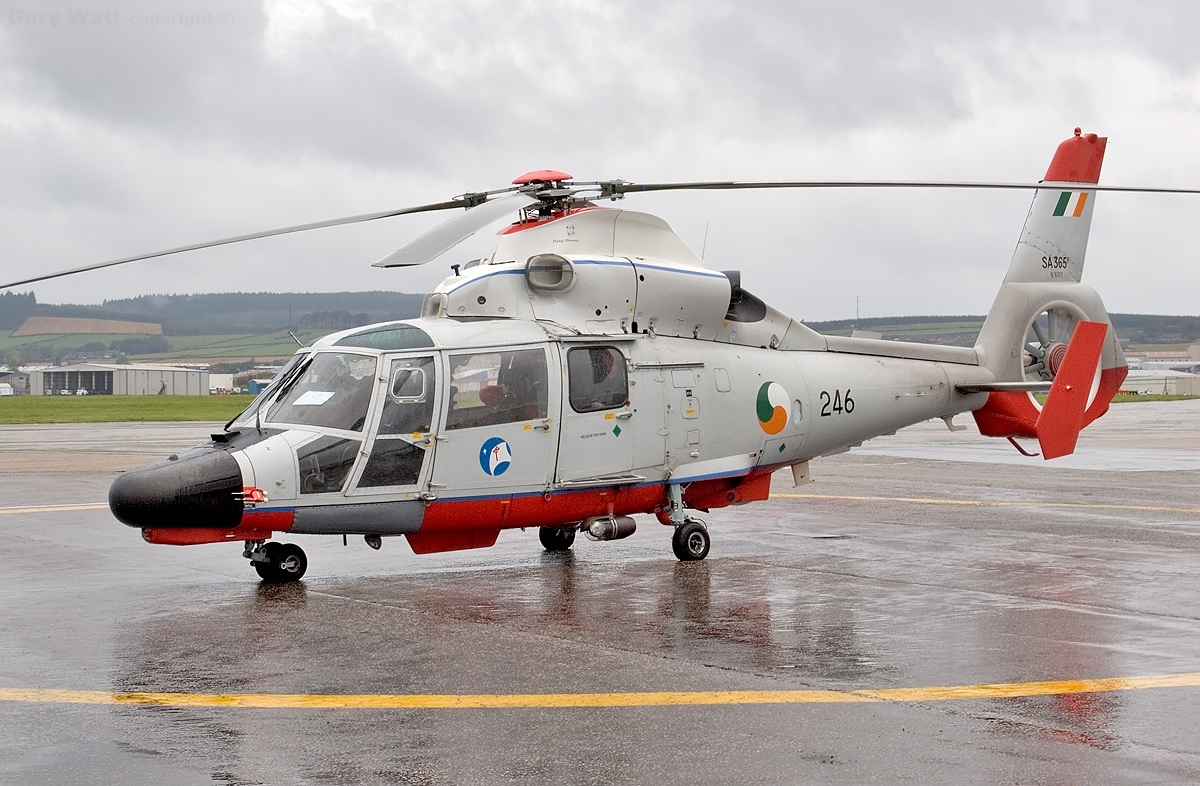
Air Corps Dauphin #246

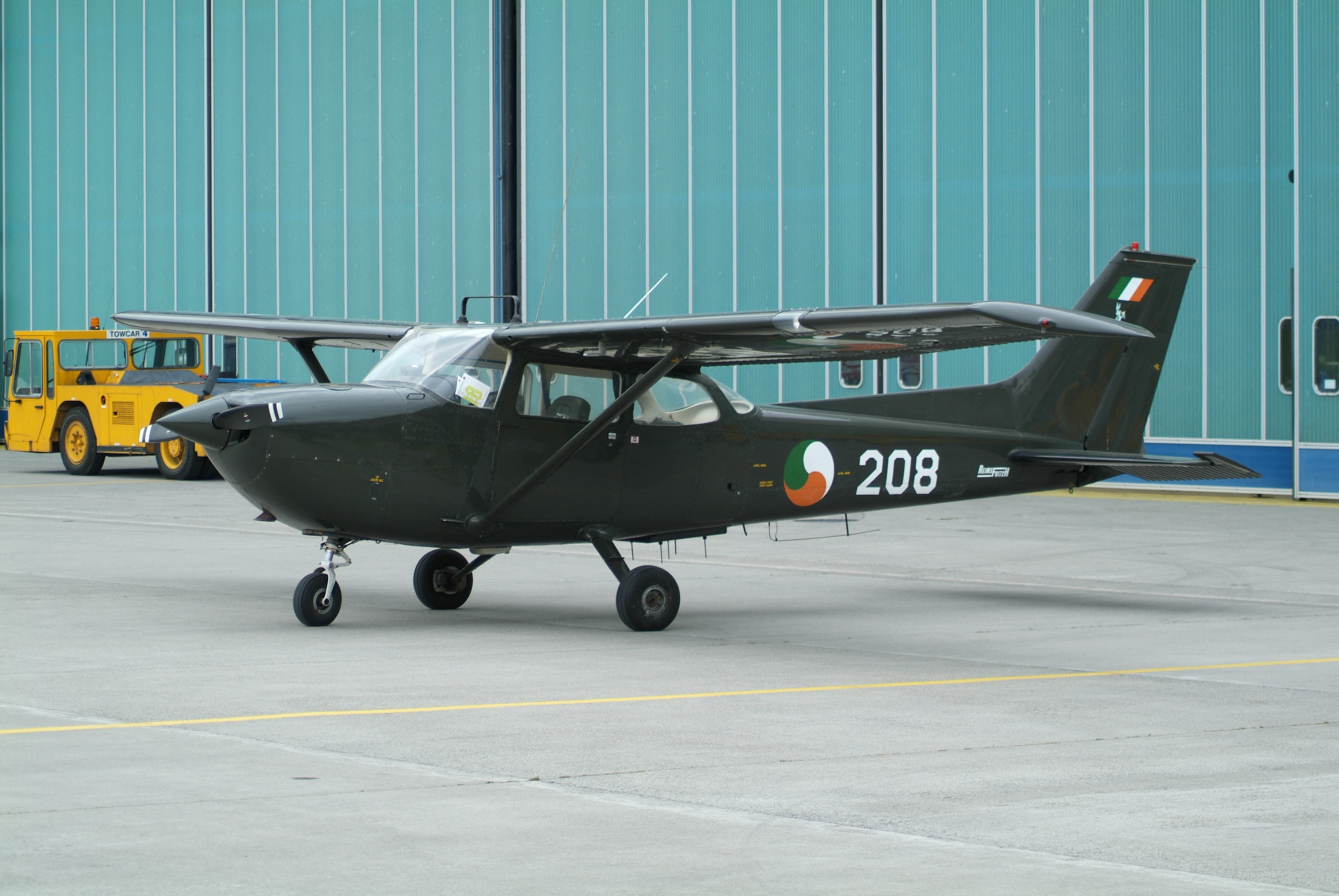
Air Corps Cessna #208

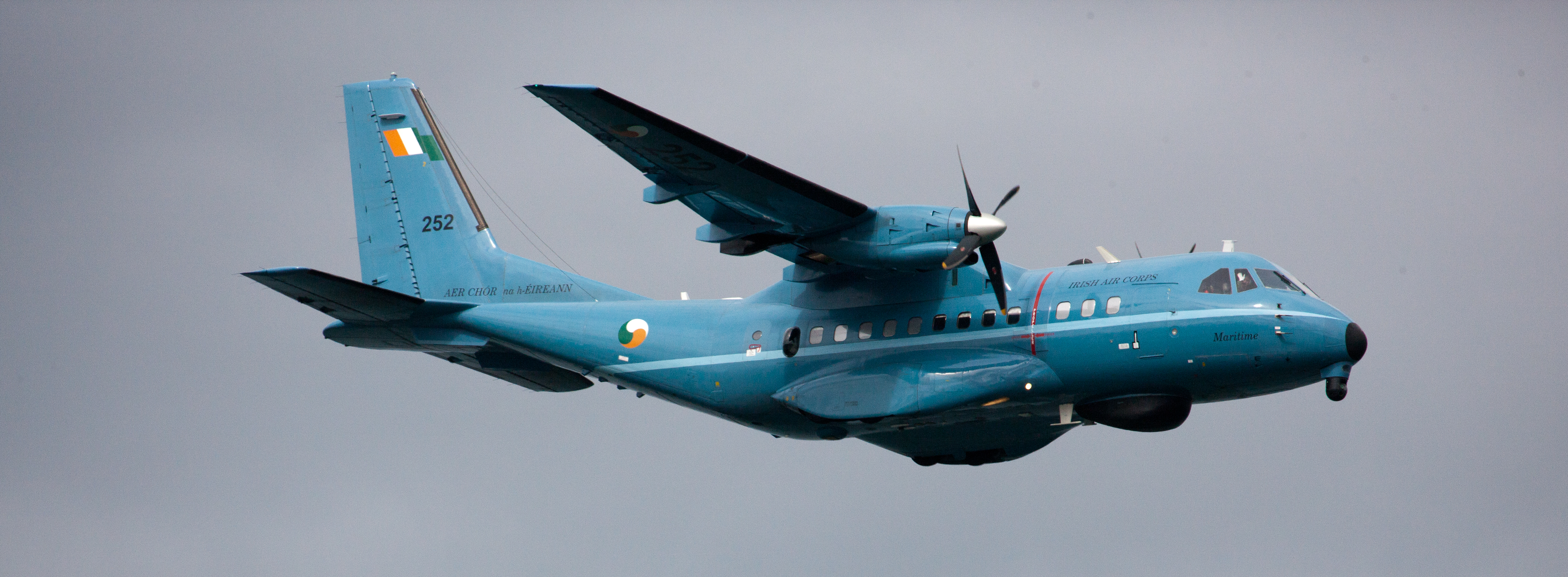
Air Corps Case CN-235 #252

Aircraft	Origin	# in Service	Serial Nos	Service Years	Notes
Fighter aircraft
Bristol F.2B Fighter	United Kingdom	8	I-VIII	1922-35	
Bristol F.2B Fighter Mk.II	United Kingdom	6	17-22	1925-35	
Martinsyde F.4 Buzzard	United Kingdom	4	I-IV	1922-29	
RAE S.E.5a	United Kingdom	1	II	1922	Force-landed in Mallow and destroyed by Anti-Treaty IRA.
Gloster Gladiator I	United Kingdom	4	23-26	1938-44	12 more were ordered (#27-30 and #53-60), but not delivered due to outbreak of Second World War.
Hawker Hurricane I	United Kingdom	12	93, 103-112 and 114	1940-46	One RAF fighter force-landed in County Wexford in 1940 and purchased by Ireland. Eleven more acquired in 1943 from surplus RAF stocks.
Hawker Hurricane IIa	United Kingdom	1	94	1941-43	RAF fighter force-landed in County Waterford. Interned and used as an advanced trainer. Returned to RAF in 1943.
Hawker Hurricane IIb	United Kingdom	1	95	1941-43	RAF fighter force-landed in County Meath. Repaired and used by Ireland as an advanced trainer. Returned to RAF in 1943.
Hawker Hurricane IIc	United Kingdom	6	115-120	1945-47	Acquired from surplus RAF stocks to partially replace the Hurricane Is.
Supermarine Type 506 Irish Seafire	United Kingdom	12	146-157	1947-55	Aircraft were former LF.IIIs denavalised before delivery.
Bomber aircraft
De Havilland DH.9	United Kingdom	8	I-VI,7-8	1923-35	Six originally acquired. Additional two attrition replacements acquired in 1929.
Fairey Battle TT.I	United Kingdom	1	92	1941-46	RAF target tug force-landed in County Waterford. Purchased by Ireland and used as a target tug.
Hawker Hind I	United Kingdom	6	67-72	1940-44	Planned to acquire 15, but only six were. Used as advanced trainers.
Lockheed Hudson I	United States of America	1	91	1941-45	RAF coastal patrol bomber force-landed in County Sligo. Purchased by Ireland and used for maritime patrol.
Reconnaissance and patrol aircraft
CASA CN-235M-100	Spain	3	250, 252, 253	1991-2023	#250 was in use from 1991-95 until #252 and #253 arrived in 1994. Used for maritime patrol. #252 retired to Airbus museum in Seville, Spain.
Reims-Cessna FR172H Rocket	United States of America	8	203-10	1972-2019	#206 and #210 are on display at Shannon Aviation Museum. #203 is on display at Ulster Aviation Society Museum.
Reims-Cessna FR172K Rocket	United States of America	1	243	1981-2019	Attrition replacement
Britten-Norman BN-2T-4S Defender 4000	United Kingdom	1	254	1997-2023	Operated for Garda Air Support Unit.
Fairey IIIF Mk. II	United Kingdom	1	-	1928-34	Another four Mk. IV were ordered and later cancelled due to economic cut backs.
Supermarine V.S. 236 Walrus I	United Kingdom	3	N18-20	1939-45	N18 is on display in Fleet Air Arm Museum, Yeovil.
Transport and liaison aircraft
Avro 652A Anson I	United Kingdom	9	A19-22 (renumbered 19-22) and 41-45	1937-46	The first monoplanes and aircraft with retractable undercarriage to enter service with the Army Air Corps. Seven more ordered (#46-52), but not delivered due to outbreak of Second World War.
Avro Anson C.19	United Kingdom	3	141-143	1946-62	Used as navigation trainers. #141 is on display in the Air Corps Museum.
Avro 626 Prefect	United Kingdom	4	A10-A13 (renumbered 10-13)	1934-41	Replaced Vickers Vespas. Also used as navigation trainers.
Hawker Siddeley HS.125-600B	United Kingdom	2	236 and 239	1979-80	Leased for one year for ministerial transport. #239 was an attrition replacement for #236.
Hawker Siddeley HS.125-700B	United Kingdom	1	238	1980-92	Used for ministerial transport.
Beechcraft Super King Air 200T	United States of America	3	232, 234, and 240	1977-2009	#232 and #234 used for maritime patrol and retired in 1991. #240 used for ministerial transport and retired in 2009.
de Havilland DH.84 Dragon 2	United Kingdom	1	DH18 (renumbered 18)	1937-41	First twin engined aircraft to enter service with the Air Corps. Used as a target tug.
de Havilland DH.104 Dove 4	United Kingdom	1	176	1953-70	Replaced Anson C.19. Used for twin-engined training and photographic surveys.
de Havilland DH.104 Dove 5	United Kingdom	1	188	1959-61	Replaced Anson C.19. Used for calibration of radar and navigation aids.
de Havilland DH.104 Dove 7	United Kingdom	1	194	1962-78	Used for photographic surveys.
de Havilland DH.104 Dove 8A	United Kingdom	1	201	1970-77	Used for calibration of navigation aids.
Gulfstream III	United States of America	1	249	1990-92	Leased for two years for ministerial transport.
Gulfstream IV	United States of America	1	251	1991-2014	Used for ministerial transport. Sold to USA.
Hawker Hector	United Kingdom	13	78-90	1941-43	Ten acquired from surplus RAF stock in 1941. Three attrition replacements acquired in 1942. Used as advanced trainers.
Learjet 45	United States of America	1	258	2004-2026	Used for ministerial transport. Replaced by Dassault Falcon 6X. Sold to USA.
Martinsyde Type A Mk II	United Kingdom	1	-	1921-27	Acquired in September 1921 and joined the newly formed National Army Air Service in July 1922.
Vickers Type 193 Vespa IV	United Kingdom	4	V1-4	1930-4	Purpose built for the Army Air Corps.
Vickers Type 208 Vespa V	United Kingdom	4	V5-8	1931-42	Purpose built for the Army Air Corps.
Westland Lysander II	United Kingdom	6	61-66	1939-47	Also used as target tugs.
Helicopters
Aérospatiale SA 316B Alouette III	France	8	195-197, 202, 211-214	1963-2007	First helicopters to be operated by Air Corps. #202 is on display at Ulster Aviation Society Museum. The tailboom of #196 is on display at Shannon Aviation Museum.
Aérospatiale SA 330J Puma	France	1	242	1982-83	Leased for two years for search and rescue and troop transport.
Aérospatiale SA 342L Gazelle	France	2	237 and 241	1980-2005	Used for pilot training.
Aérospatiale SA 365F Dauphin 2	France	5	244-248	1986-2006	Used for search and rescue. #244 and #245 were equipped for naval operations on LÉ Eithne. #248 destroyed in a crash, 4 people died.
Sikorsky S-61N	United States of America	1	257	2003-04	Government had planned to acquire three S-61 for search and rescue, with options for two more transport versions. #257 was leased for three years to train crews, but returned after eighteen (18) months when the government decided to completely privatise the SAR role and cancelled the S-61 order.
Eurocopter AS 355N Twin Squirrel	France	1	255	1997-2008	Operated for Garda Air Support Unit.
Trainer aircraft
Avro 504K	United Kingdom	6	I-VI	1922-32	
Avro 621 Tutor	United Kingdom	3	A7-9	1930-7	Replaced the Avro 504
Avro 631 Cadet	United Kingdom	7	C1-7 (renumbered 1-7)	1932-45	C7 acquired as an attrition replacement. Planes also used for coastal patrol duties.
Avro 636	United Kingdom	4	A14-17 (renumbered 14-17)	1935-41	Army Air Corps were the sole users of this airplane.
de Havilland DH.60 Cirrus I Moth	United Kingdom	4	23-26	1926-35	
de Havilland Canada DHC-1 Chipmunk T.20	Canada	12	164-175	1952-81	Replaced Miles M.14 Magister. #164 is on display at Shannon Aviation Museum.
de Havilland Canada DHC-1 Chipmunk T.22	Canada	2	199-200	1965-80	Attrition replacements for Chipmunk T.20.
de Havilland DH.115 Vampire T.55	United Kingdom	7	185-187, 191-193, and 198	1956-76	Replaced Supermarine Seafires. First turbojet aircraft to serve in the Air Corps. #198 was delivered in 1963 as an instructional airframe. #191 is on display at Shannon Aviation Museum. #198 is on display at National Museum in Collins Barracks (Dublin).
Fouga CM.170-2 Super Magister	France	7	215-221	1975-99	Replaced the Vampires. #221 was an instructional airframe. #216 and #220 are on display at Shannon Aviation Museum. #218 is on display at Ulster Aviation Society Museum.
Hunting Percival Provost T.51	United Kingdom	4	177-180	1954-76	Unarmed advanced trainer.
Hunting Percival Provost T.53	United Kingdom	7	181-184, 189, 189A, and 190	1955-76	Armed advanced trainer. #183 is on display at Shannon Aviation Museum.
Miles M.14A Magister I	United Kingdom	27	31-40, 73-77, and 127-138	1939-53	Replaced Avro 631 Cadets. Ten acquired in 1939. Five more acquired in 1940 as alternatives to Hind I. Twelve more acquired in 1946 as attrition replacements. #34 is on display in the National Museum of Ireland in Collins Barracks (Dublin).
Miles M.25 Martinet TT.I	United Kingdom	2	144-145	1946-58	Replaced the Lysanders. Used as target tugs.
Miles M.9A Master I	United Kingdom	1	96	1940	RAF trainer force-landed in County Louth. Purchased by Ireland and used as an instructional airframe.
Miles M.19 Master II	United Kingdom	12	97-102 and 121-126	1943-49	Six acquired in 1943 from surplus RAF stocks. Another six acquired in 1945 as attrition replacements.
SIAI-Marchetti SF.260W Warrior	Italy	11	222-231, 235	1977-2003	Replaced Chipmunks and Provosts. Armed basic trainer. #235 was an attrition replacement. Three SF.260D were leased for pilot training in 1991-2. #231 is on display at Shannon Aviation Museum.
SIAI-Marchetti SF.260MC	Italy	1	233	1977-2003	Former Zairian aircraft used as an instructional airframe.
Supermarine Spitfire Tr.9	United Kingdom	6	158-163	1951-61	Replaced the Miles Master IIs. As of 2025, #158, #162, and #163 were still flying as warbirds. #159 was formerly a warbird.
