= Waterford Airport =

Waterford Airport Aerfort Phort Láirge

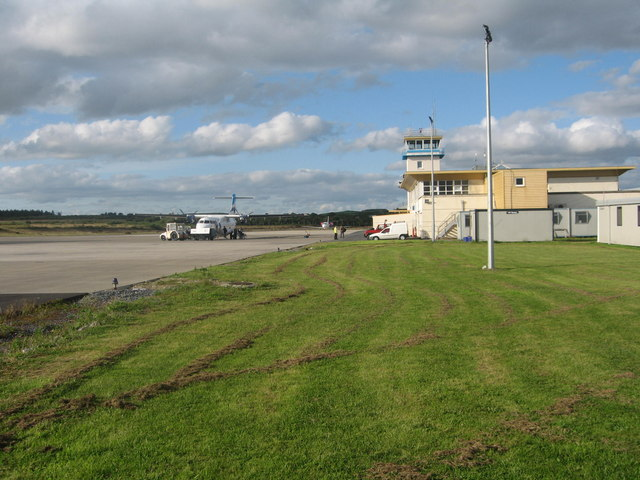
- IATA: WAT; ICAO: EIWF

Summary
- Airport type: Public
- Operator: Waterford Airport Ltd
- Serves: Waterford, Ireland
- Location: Killowen
- Opened: 1981
- Elevation AMSL: 119 ft (36 m)
- Coordinates: 52°11′14″N 007°05′13″W
- Website: flywaterford.com

Map
- Location within Ireland

Runways
Direction	Length		Surface
Direction	m	ft	Surface
03/21	1,433 (1,585)	4,701 (5,200)	Asphalt

Statistics (2017)
- Passengers: 2,249
- Passenger change 16–17: ▼85.1
- Sources: Airport website, Passengers

Waterford Airport (Irish: Aerfort Phort Láirge; IATA: WAT, ICAO: EIWF) is located in Killowen, 4 NM (7.4 km; 4.6 mi) southeast of Waterford. Located in southeastern Ireland, the airport is operated by Waterford Airport Ltd.

The airport's single scheduled commercial route, operated by VLM Airlines—which used Waterford as its only Irish airport and kept a base there—was discontinued in June 2016 as VLM went out of business, leaving the airport without any scheduled commercial air traffic. Since the discontinuation of commercial aviation at the airport, it has primarily been used for general aviation, including pilot training, search and rescue, aerial surveys and business flights.

As of mid-2026, construction work to extend the airport's runway had reportedly commenced, with a view to potentially reopening the airport to commercial traffic during 2027.

== History ==
=== Early years ===
The airport's development was initiated by Waterford Corporation, with support from the Government of Ireland and the private sector, in 1979–1980. The investment was £1.76 million.

Waterford Airport opened in 1981, with a 1,200 by 29 m (3,937 by 95 ft) runway for single and twin-engine light aircraft and a portable cabin as the terminal building. The current terminal building was opened in 1992, and the runway was lengthened to 1,433 by 30 m (4,701 by 98 ft). Avair provided the first domestic passenger service in 1982, as a stop between Cork and Dublin Airport. In 1985, Ryanair launched the company's first international scheduled service from Waterford to London Gatwick.

=== Development in the 2000s ===
Waterford Airport celebrated 21 years of scheduled operations in 2006. On 13 March 2007, a €27.5 million upgrade of the airport was announced. Over the next two years the money would be spent on extending the runway to 7,300 feet (2,200 m) in length, building a new passenger terminal capable of handling one million passengers a year, and introducing scheduled flights to European cities such as Amsterdam, Barcelona, Paris, Prague and Rome. There was also an expectation of charter flights to Mediterranean holiday resorts. The expansion would mean that air travellers in the southeast of Ireland would have a "credible alternative" to Dublin and Cork airports, according to officials at Waterford Airport. According to the chief executive of Waterford Airport, Graham Doyle, the extended runway was to be in place by summer 2009 and capable of handling large jet aircraft, including the Airbus A320 and the Boeing 737.

The fully upgraded and remodelled connecting regional road R708 from Waterford city to the airport was completed in early July 2008, reducing the journey time from Waterford city centre to the airport to 10 minutes at off-peak times, and from the outer ring road, R470, to the airport to 5 minutes.

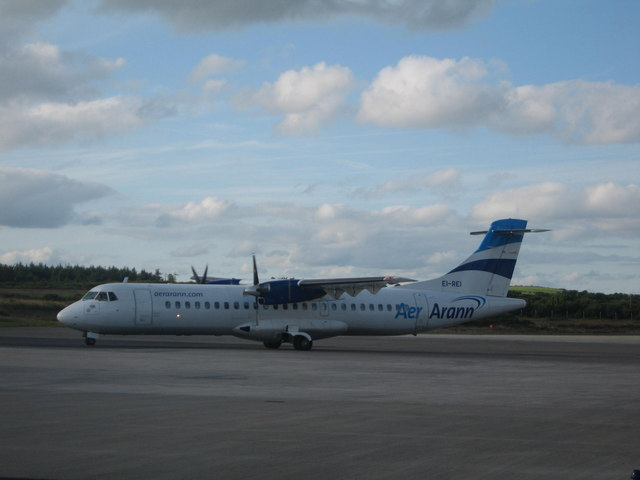
An Aer Arann ATR 72 at Waterford in 2009

Passenger numbers through Waterford Airport slumped in 2009, owing to the suspension of routes to Bordeaux, Faro, Málaga and Amsterdam, and to service reductions on routes to Birmingham, London Luton and Manchester. Overall passenger numbers from the UK fell by 9%.

=== 2010s ===
In February 2010, an Economic Impact Assessment of Waterford Airport was published, which highlighted the importance of the airport to the South East Region. Noel Dempsey, the Minister for Transport, announced on 9 March 2010 that owing to difficulties with public finances there would be no funding for the runway extension at the airport, and that security and safety were priorities "in the current financial climate".

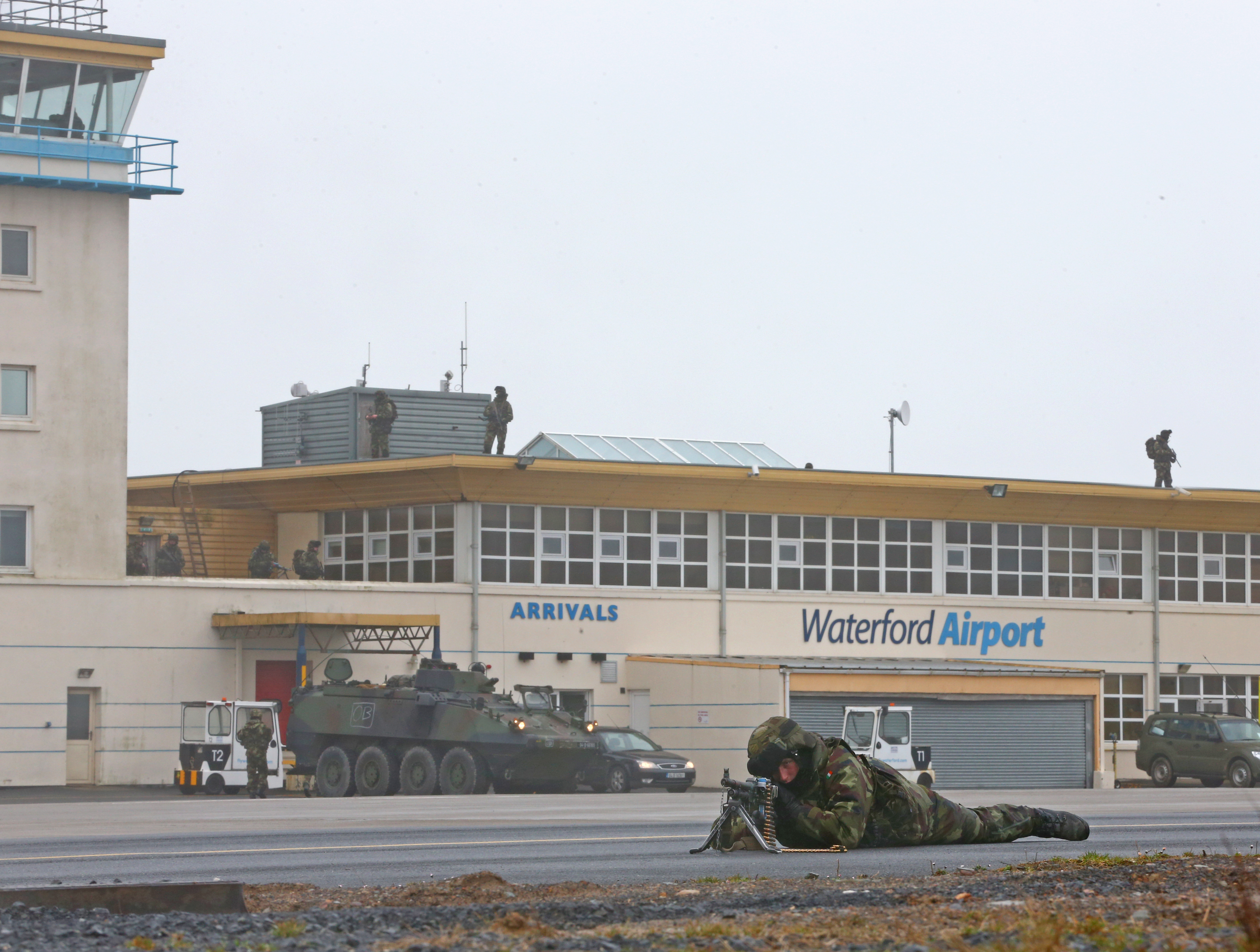
Members of the Irish Army during an exercise at the airport in April 2013

In November 2012, Aer Arann announced it would terminate all its routes from Waterford. The airline, operating under Aer Lingus Regional, stated that it would suspend its service to London Southend, London Luton and Manchester from 6 January 2013.

On 12 August 2013, it was reported that a 150m extension of the runway would be funded by the Department of Transport up to a limit of €400,000. The airport itself would have to raise the remaining €850,000 for it to take place.

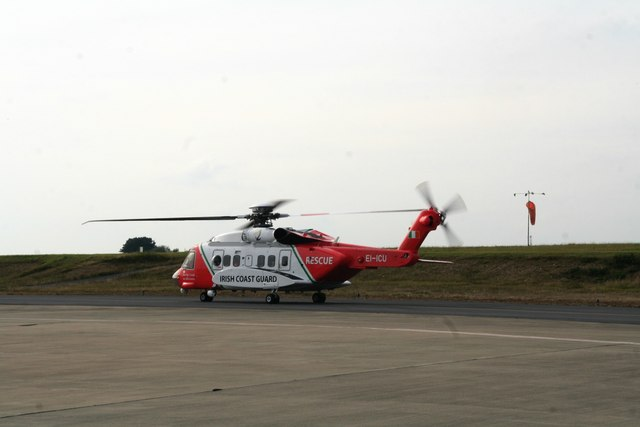
Irish Coast Guard helicopter at Waterford Airport in September 2015

In April 2015, the Belgian airline VLM Airlines took over the routes to Birmingham and London Luton. However, in June 2016 the airline, having already ceased the route to Birmingham, announced that it would terminate its flights to London Luton at short notice by 13 June 2016, leaving Waterford Airport without any scheduled traffic.

In June 2017, after a year without commercial flights, a new airline Aer Southeast said that it planned to introduce services to London Luton, Manchester and Birmingham. While these services were due to commence in July 2017 using Saab 340 turboprop aircraft, these services never operated and, in 2018, the airline shut down.

A €12 million plan was announced in June 2019 to extend the airport's runway by 850 metres and revamp the airport. Minister for Transport Shane Ross was to give the airport €5 million once the extended runway was confirmed and ready for service. Local corporations, such as Glanbia, Coolmore Stud and Dawn Meats, pledged €5 million, with €2 million proposed to come from local authorities.

=== 2020s ===
On 4 February 2022, planning permission was granted by An Bord Pleanála for the runway extension and associated works. At that time, construction was projected to be completed by the end of 2022.

In August 2022, it was reported that the billionaire Comer brothers had agreed a €20 million deal to buy a majority stake in Waterford Airport. In December 2023, it was reported that Comer Group International, in association with Bolster Group, planned to invest €12 million into the airport. This investment was projected to cover nearly half of the €25 million total cost. These plans called for the runway to be extended by 854 metres and widened by 15 metres, with the upgraded runway therefore measuring 2,287 metres long and 45 metres wide. As of July 2025, this project had yet to commence as the airport awaited approval of €12 million in funding from the government.

In July 2025, Ryanair CEO Michael O'Leary opined that the airport would "never be a commercial proposition", commenting that Waterford was within the two-hour catchment area of Dublin and Cork airports.

On 1 October 2025 Bolster Group announced it had secured a funding package of over €30 million to deliver the complete capital project, enabling commercial flights to return to Ireland's South East region for the first time since 2016. This privately funded proposal was approved by Waterford City & County Council in October 2025. Concerns were raised, however, at the continued anonymity of the new investor, and particularly in Waterford City and County Council's decision to forgive a loan of €670,000, to waive its small minority shareholding in the airport, and to agree to sell €2.3 million worth of public land to the unnamed US investor for just €50,000 as part of the agreement.

In November 2025, the general manager of the airport, Aidan Power, reportedly stated that "if contacts are signed, construction work can commence [on the runway] in the first quarter of 2026". Power suggested that, if completed as planned, the "target is to commence flights in the summer of 2027".

In December 2025, an Emergency General Meeting (EGM) voted to begin the liquidation process for Waterford Regional Airport Plc, to transfer assets to Waterford Airport Ltd. In March 2026, ahead of a further EGM to approve the vote, the anonymous investor was identified as American billionaire Kelcy Warren. In April 2026, the company which previously operated the airport (Waterford Regional Airport Plc) was liquidated and the company controlled by Warren (Waterford Airport Ltd) commenced preliminary works on the airport's grounds.

A sod turning event, marking planned runway upgrades at the airport, was held in May 2026, and machinery for ground-levelling works was reported to be on site as of late June 2026.

== Facilities ==
As of 2010, Waterford Airport had four check-in desks, an information desk, two boarding gates and two baggage carousels. The airport has 200 car-parking spaces. There are two snack bars in the airport: one before security and one in the departures hall. There are also first-aid facilities, a baby/parent room and disabled access facilities.

== Airlines and destinations ==
As of 2026, Waterford Airport has no scheduled commercial passenger flights. It is primarily used for training purposes by Waterford Aero Club and the Atlantic Flight Training Academy (AFTA). The Irish Coast Guard also has a base at the airport.

== Statistics ==
Passenger numbers
Year	Passengers [P]	% Change [P]	Movements [M]	% Change [M]	Carriers
2003	24,000	▲12%	-	-	Aer Arann
2004	55,000	▲22%	-	-	Aer Arann
2005	71,000	▲13%	-	-	Aer Arann
2006	85,000	▲12%	23,724	-	Aer Arann
2007	116,000	▲13%	30,156	▲21%	Aer Arann
2008	144,000	▲12%	29,811	▼1%	Aer Arann
2009	112,000	▼11%	19,848	-	Aer Arann
2010	104,000	▼7%	17680	-	Aer Arann
2011	69,942	▼32%	18,227	-	Aer Arann
2012	78,393	▲12%	15,053	-	Aer Lingus Regional, Flybe
2013	28,168	▼63.8%	11,701	-	Flybe
2014	33,189	▲17.8%	9301	-	Flybe
2015	34,213	▲3.1%	11,690	-	VLM Airlines, Flybe
2016	13,511	▼60.6%	12,508	-	VLM Airlines
2018			11,956		
2019			10,761		

== Ground transport ==
The airport is on the R708 road, which can be accessed from the R710 outer ring road in Waterford. Waterford has a bypass, and thus the airport is accessible from Dungarvan, County Tipperary, County Kilkenny, County Carlow and County Wexford.

The nearest bus and coach station is 10 km away in Waterford. The nearest train station, Waterford railway station also in Waterford city, has services to Limerick and Dublin Heuston.

== Accidents and incidents ==
- On 8 July 1999, a Eurocopter AS365 Dauphin of the Irish Air Corps crashed into the sand dunes near Tramore at 00:40 am UTC +1 after returning from a sea-air rescue mission. The helicopter, Rescue 111, was destroyed by fire and all four crew were killed. Among other contributing factors, the Air Accident Investigation Unit report noted the lack of an air traffic controller in Waterford, inadequate weather reports, and faulty approach lighting to the airport runway.
