= R682 road (Ireland) =

Regional road in County Waterford, Ireland

R682 road
- Bóthar R682
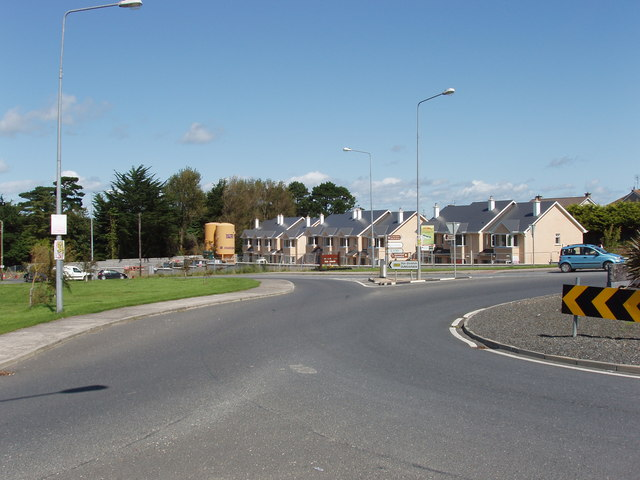
- Monvoy Roundabout, Tramore, where the R682 meets the R675

Route information
- Length: 8.1 km (5.0 mi)

Major junctions
- From: R680 at Bawnfune, County Waterford

- R685 at Monvoy

- To: R675 at Tramore

Location
- Country: Ireland

Highway system
- Roads in Ireland; Motorways; Primary; Secondary; Regional
← R681	→ R683

The R682 road is a regional road in County Waterford, Ireland. It travels from the R680 road to the R675, connecting the N25 road with Tramore. The road is 8.1 kilometres (5.0 mi) long.
