= R709 road (Ireland) =

Road in Ireland

R709 road
- Bóthar R709

Major junctions
- From: R680 at Cork Road, Waterford

- R675 at Tramore Road; R708 at Lower Grange; R860 at Passage Road

- To: R683 at Newtown Road

Location
- Country: Ireland

Highway system
- Roads in Ireland; Motorways; Primary; Secondary; Regional
← R708	→ R710

The R709 road is a regional road in Waterford, Ireland. It forms the Inner Ring Road around the south of the inner city. It begins at the junction with the R680 at Cork Road and ends at the junction with the R683 at Newtown Road, and passes via the Inner Ring Road (purpose-built section), Richardson's Folly, Inner Ring Road (purpose-built section) and Passage Road.

The R710 forms the Outer Ring Road around the south of the city.

== See also ==
- Roads in Ireland
