= R681 road (Ireland) =

Regional road in County Waterford, Ireland

R681 road
- Bóthar R681

Route information
- Length: 14.4 km (8.9 mi)

Major junctions
- From: R680 at The Sweep, County Waterford

- To: R675 at Knockmahon

Location
- Country: Ireland

Highway system
- Roads in Ireland; Motorways; Primary; Secondary; Regional
← R680	→ R682

The R681 road is a regional road in County Waterford, Ireland. It travels from the R680 road to the R675, from the village of Kilmeaden to Knockmahon, via Kill. The road is 14.4 kilometres (8.9 mi) long.
