= R708 road =

R708 road may refer to:

- R708 road (Ireland)
- R708 (South Africa)
