= R680 road (Ireland) =

Road in Ireland

R680 road
- Bóthar R680
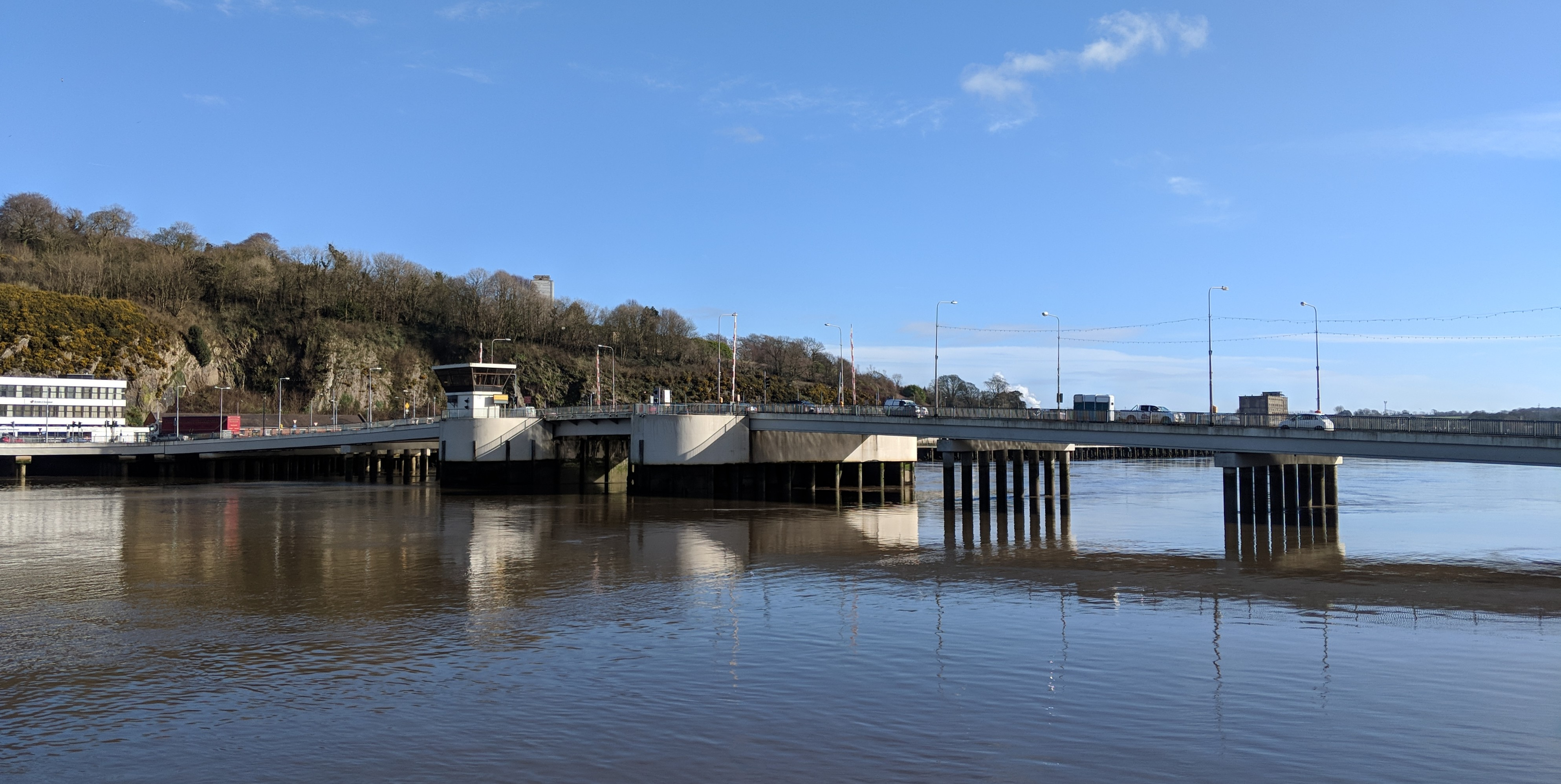
- The Edmund Rice Bridge carries the R680 over the River Suir in Waterford

Route information
- Length: 52.7 km (32.7 mi)

Major junctions
- From: R671 at Waterford Road, Clonmel, County Tipperary
- Enter County Waterford: R706 at Gurteen Lower; Enter County Tipperary: R676 at Carrickbeg; Enter County Waterford: R698 at Mountbolton; Cross River Clodiagh near Portlaw; N25 at Ballyduff East; R681 at The Sweep; R682 at Bawnfune; R710 at Butlerstown North; R686/ R709 Waterford Inner Ring Road at Kingsmeadow; R675 at Tramore Road, Waterford; R860 at John Street, Waterford; R708 at Catherine Street, Waterford; R683 at Lombard Street, Waterford; R683 at Bridge Street, Waterford

- To: R448 at Terminus Street, Waterford

Location
- Country: Ireland

Highway system
- Roads in Ireland; Motorways; Primary; Secondary; Regional
← R679	→ R681

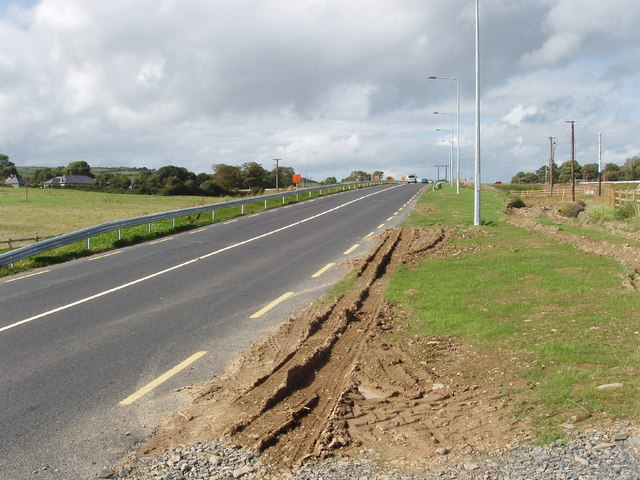
Upgraded section of R680 near Kilmeaden

The R680 road is a regional road in Ireland. It travels from Clonmel, County Tipperary to Waterford city centre, via Carrick-on-Suir and Kilmeadan. The road is 52.7 kilometres (32.7 mi) long.
