= R687 road (Ireland) =

Road in Ireland

R687 road
- Bóthar R687
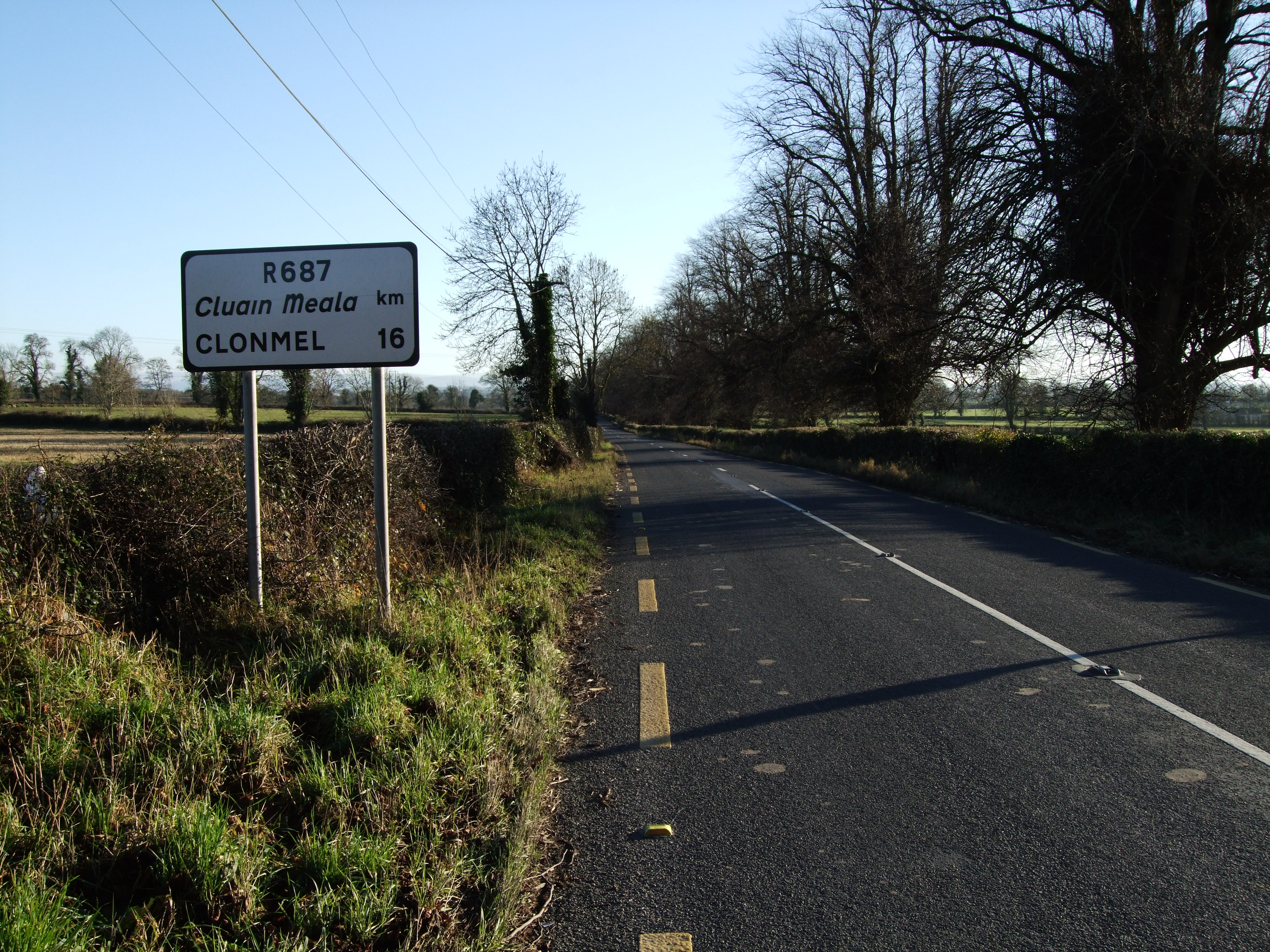
- The R687 near New Inn, County Tipperary

Major junctions
- From: R639 at New Inn, County Tipperary
- To: N24 at Rathkeevin

Location
- Country: Ireland

Highway system
- Roads in Ireland; Motorways; Primary; Secondary; Regional
← R686	→ R688

The R687 road is a regional road in County Tipperary, Ireland. The route runs from its junction with the R639 at New Inn for approximately 10 km (6 mi) until it meets the N24 in the townland of Rathkeevin, west of Clonmel.

== See also ==
- Roads in Ireland
- National primary road
