= R684 road (Ireland) =

Road in Ireland

R684 road
- Bóthar R684
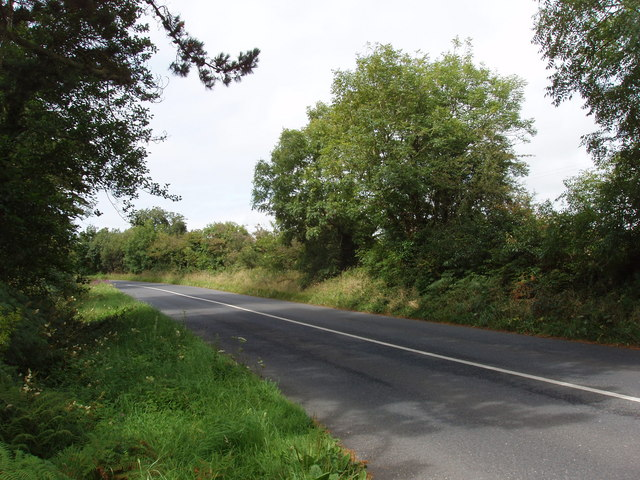
- R684 road out of Dunmore East

Major junctions
- From: R683 at Blenheim Cross, Waterford

- R685 at Kilmacomb
- To: Dock Road, Dunmore East

Location
- Country: Ireland

Highway system
- Roads in Ireland; Motorways; Primary; Secondary; Regional
| ← R683 | → R685 |

The R684 road is a regional road in County Waterford, Ireland. It runs near Waterford City, linking the junction with the R683 at Blenheim Cross to the village of Dunmore East.

The road travels via Callaghane Bridge, Kilmacomb, where it meets the R685, and terminates at Dock Road in Dunmore East. In addition to the section of the R683 linking Waterford city to the junction at Blenheim Cross, the R684 is known as Dunmore Road.

== See also ==
- Roads in Ireland
