= R683 road (Ireland) =

Road in Ireland

R683 road
- Bóthar R683
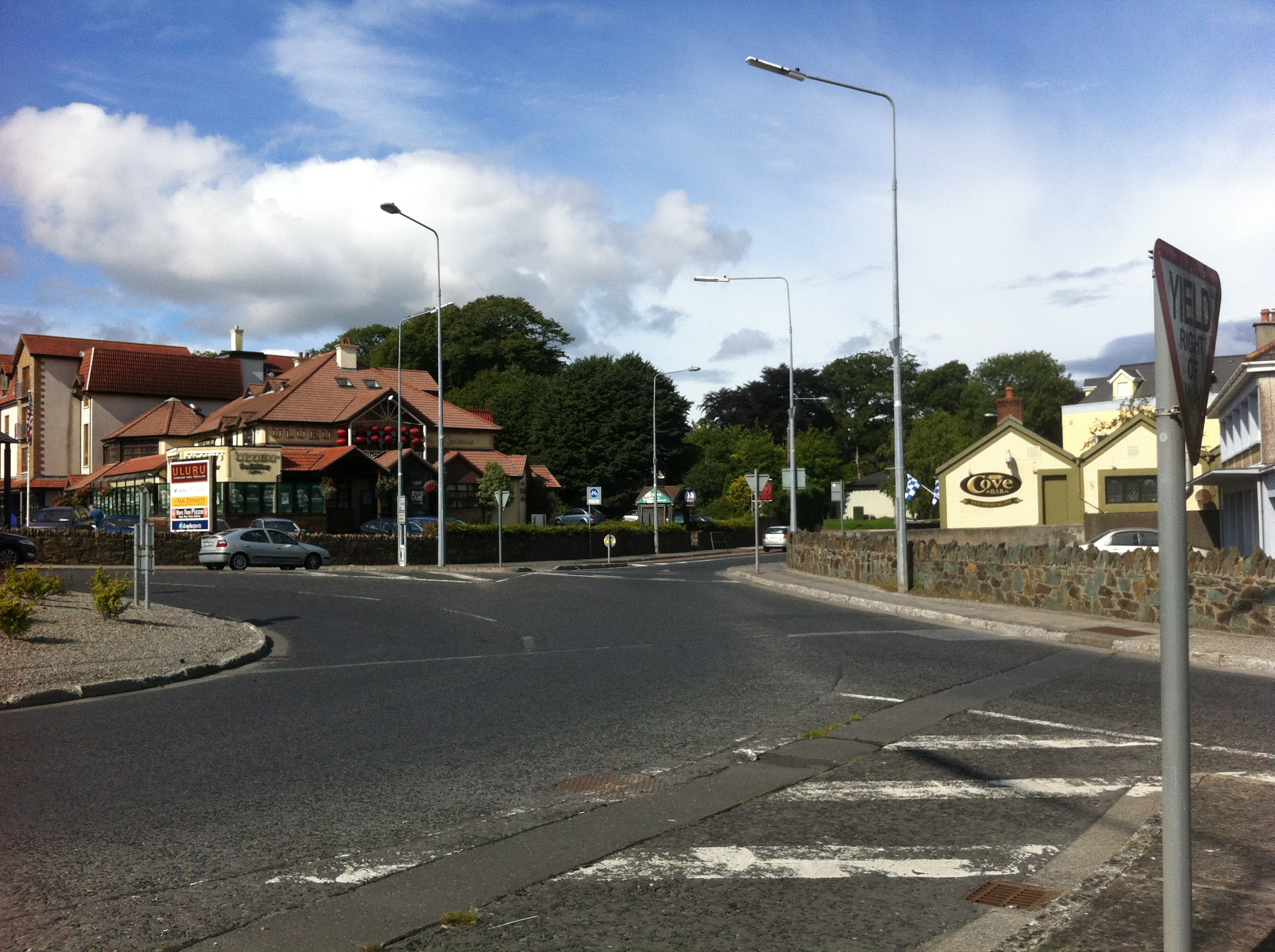
- Dunmore Road, Waterford, on the R683

Major junctions
- From: R680 at The Mall, Waterford

- R709 at Passage Road, Waterford; R710 at Cumann na mBan Ring Road, Waterford; R684 at Blenheim Cross, Waterford
- To: Ferry Terminal, Passage East

Location
- Country: Ireland

Highway system
- Roads in Ireland; Motorways; Primary; Secondary; Regional
← R682	→ R684

The R683 road is a regional road in County Waterford, Ireland. It connects Waterford city to the village and ferry port of Passage East. The ferry operates across the River Barrow estuary to the village of Ballyhack, County Wexford.

The route begins at The Mall in Waterford and runs via Lombard Street, William Street, Newtown Road, Dunmore Road, in the city, and Halfway House Bridge and Cowsheen Bridge in County Waterford. It terminates at River Road in Passage East.

The section between Waterford city and the junction with the R684 at Blenheim Cross is named Dunmore Road. From this junction, the R684 is the continuation of Dunmore Road as far as the village of Dunmore East.

== See also ==
- Roads in Ireland
