= R685 road (Ireland) =

Regional road in Ireland

Coordinates: 52.173056°N 7.133919°W

R685 road
- Bóthar R685

Route information
- Length: 12.1 km (7.5 mi)

Major junctions
- From: R682 Monvoy
- R675 Tramore; R708 Kilmacleague West
- To: R684 Kilmacomb

Location
- Country: Ireland

Highway system
- Roads in Ireland; Motorways; Primary; Secondary; Regional

The R685 road is a regional road in Ireland, located in southeast County Waterford.
