= Kill, County Waterford =

Village in County Waterford, Ireland

Kill Irish: An Chill
- Village
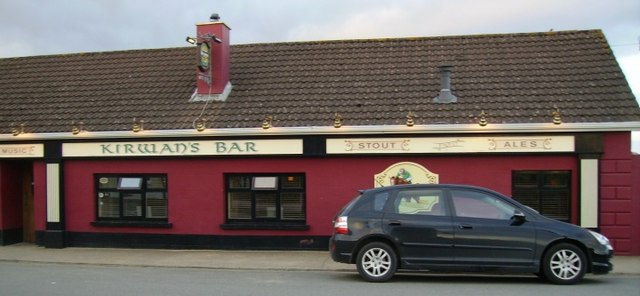
- Kirwan's Bar, Kill

- Location in Ireland
- Coordinates: 52.176°N 7.335°W
- Country: Ireland
- Province: Munster
- County: Waterford

Population (2016)
  - Total: 271
- Time zone: UTC+0 (WET)
  - Summer (DST): UTC-1 (IST (WEST))

Kill (Irish: An Chill, meaning 'the church') is a village in County Waterford, Ireland located between Dungarvan and Tramore, on the R681 road. It lies in the townlands of Kilbarrymeaden and Sleveen. The settlement takes its name from the locality of Kilbarrymeaden, a former medieval parish. A historic ruined church from this parish lies outside present day Kill. The early ecclesiastical site of Kilbarrymeaden lies 2 km southeast of the village. The pubs in the village are The Well and Dunphy's.

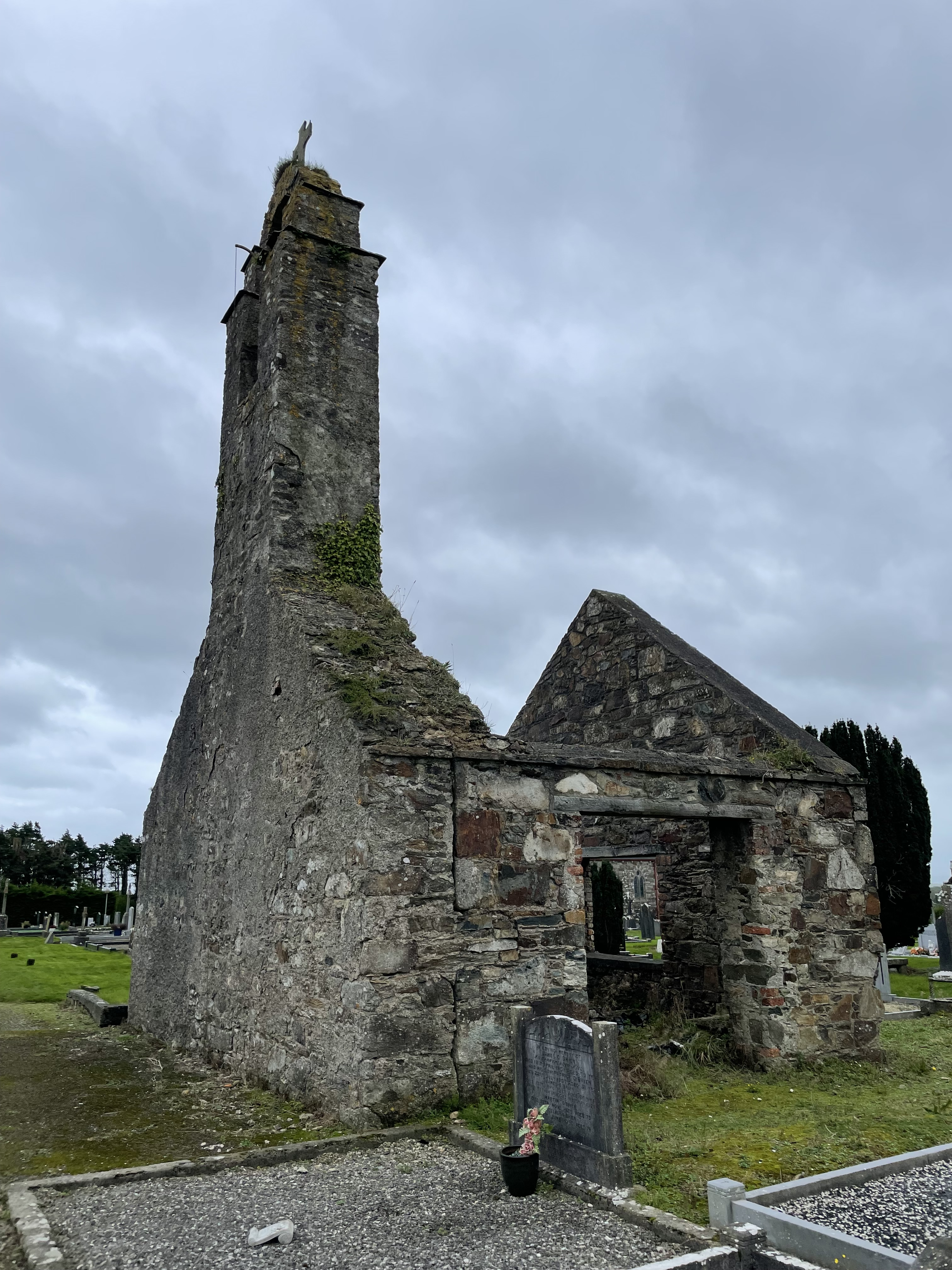
The ruins of the church in the local graveyard.

== See also ==
- List of towns and villages in Ireland
