= R710 road (Ireland) =

Road in Ireland

R710 road
- Bóthar R710
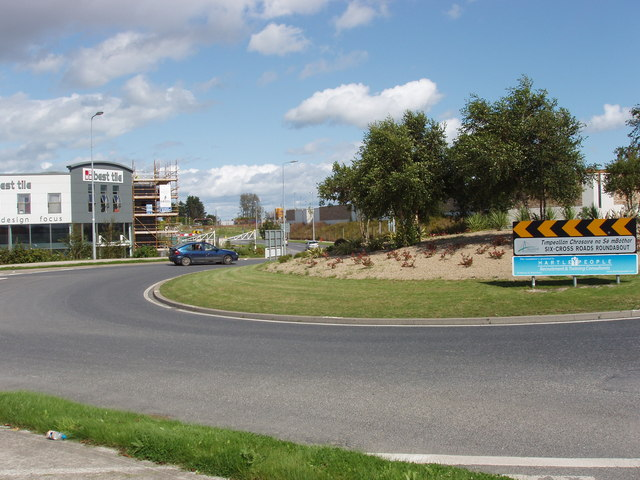
- Six Cross Roads Roundabout on the R710

Major junctions
- From: N25 at Knockhouse Upper, Waterford: R680 at Cork Road; R675 at Tramore Road; R708 at Killure Road

- To: R683 at Dunmore Road

Location
- Country: Ireland

Highway system
- Roads in Ireland; Motorways; Primary; Secondary; Regional
← R709	→ R711

The R710 road is a regional road in Ireland. Located in the south of Ireland at Waterford, it forms the Outer Ring Road around the south of the city. As of December 2006 it commences on the Old Kilmeaden Road at Knockhouse Lower, west of Waterford City and ends at a junction with the R683 on the Dunmore Road in the south-east of the city.

The R709 forms the Inner Ring Road around the south of the inner city.

== Background ==
Waterford City Council initiated work on the outer ring road in 1993. Phase one of the outer ring road, between the Dunmore Road and the Williamstown Road, opened in Autumn 1998, at a cost of about £1M. The council planned a phase 2, which would link the Williamstown and Airport roads, at a cost of £1.2M, however this phase was never carried out. Instead it was announced in 2000 that the department of Finance would fund the remainder of the road, between the Williamstown and Cork roads, though ultimately it was completed under the auspices of the National Development Plan (NDP). This main section of the outer ring road was itself built in 3 stages between March 2004 and September 2005. It was officially opened on 30 September 2005 by the then Minister for Transport Martin Cullen, at a final cost of €37m.

Phase one of the outer ring road is a single carriageway road about 1 km in length. The remainder of the road is dual carriageway, 7 km (4.3 mi) in length. This gives a total length of about 8 km (5.0 mi) for the R710 Outer Ring Road between the Ardkeen and Cork road roundabouts. The term Outer Ring Road has been occasionally used specifically for the more recent project, with the NDP and Waterford City Council referring to the project (for this section) merely as the Waterford Outer Ring Road. The 7-year gap between the completion of 'phase one' and the main section, along with the fact that the main section is dual carriageway while the phase one road is single lane perhaps lends an artificial distinction between the two route sections.

== Link to the N25 ==
October 2009 saw the completion of the N25 Waterford City Bypass (construction commenced 2006), and now the R710 is joined to the bypass via the Western Link. It is now possible travel in a circle around the city from Ardkeen to Slieverue in County Kilkenny, via the second river crossing (the N25 cable stay bridge of about 475 m in length) between Gracedieu and Grannagh.

== Roundabouts (east to west) ==
1. Ardkeen
2. Farranshoneen Road
3. Airport Road
4. Couse Bridge
5. Ballindud
6. Six Cross Roads
7. Ballycashin Road
8. Butlerstown
9. Knockhouse Lower

== See also ==
- Roads in Ireland
- National primary road
- National secondary road
