= 1999 Tramore helicopter crash =

1999 aviation accident

1999 Irish Marine Emergency Service Rescue 111 crash
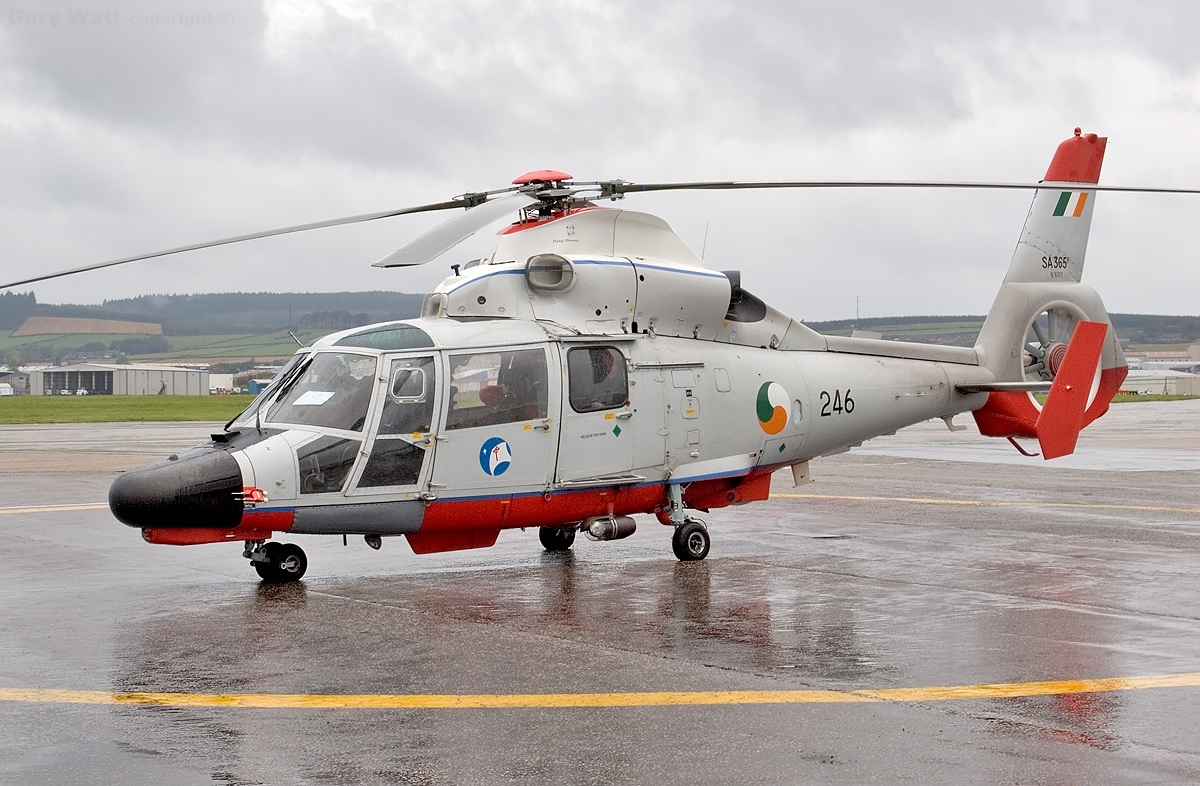
- An Irish Air Corps Aerospatiale SA-365F Dauphin 2 similar to the one that crashed

Accident
- Date: 2 July 1999
- Summary: Controlled flight into terrain
- Site: Tramore Bay, County Waterford, Ireland; 52.15101°N 7.1014°W

Aircraft
- Aircraft type: Eurocopter Dauphin
- Operator: Irish Air Corps for Irish Marine Emergency Service
- Call sign: Rescue 111
- Registration: DH248
- Flight origin: Waterford Airport, Ireland
- Occupants: 4
- Crew: 4
- Fatalities: 4
- Survivors: 0

Shortly after midnight on 02 July 1999, a Eurocopter Dauphin search and rescue helicopter operated by the Irish Air Corps crashed into the sand dunes behind Tramore beach in County Waterford while returning from a mission. All four crew aboard were killed. The helicopter was attempting to land at its base in nearby Waterford Airport, but was hampered by heavy fog.

== Background ==
Thursday 1 July 1999 was the first day that a 24-hour helicopter search and rescue service was provided from Waterford Airport. The airport is located near the coast, just north of the large beach at Tramore. The Irish Air Corps was contracted to provide the service on behalf of the Irish Marine Emergency Service (IMES; now known as the Irish Coast Guard). The helicopter (callsign Rescue 111) was a Eurocopter AS365Fi Dauphin, which had flown in from the Air Corps base at Casement Aerodrome in County Dublin that morning with a crew of 7 on board - 4 flying crew and 3 technical crew.

After arrival at Waterford, the helicopter completed a publicity flight with a TV crew from RTÉ. Later that afternoon the helicopter completed a training flight at sea, and a brief reconnaissance of the landing facilities at Waterford Regional Hospital. The aircraft was washed down and refuelled, and the crew left for their overnight accommodation at 5:15pm.

The four flying crew members were aircraft commander Captain Dave O'Flaherty (age 30), co-pilot Captain Mick Baker (age 28), winch operator Sergeant Pat Mooney (age 34) and winchman Corporal Niall Byrne (age 25).

== Mission ==
Around 20:00 that evening, the Realt Or, a 4.5 metre pleasure boat, left from Dungarvan harbour on a fishing trip with 4 men and a young boy aboard. It encountered heavy fog and was unable to navigate back to the harbour. The skipper contacted IMES by mobile phone and requested assistance. He had a marine VHF radio, but did not know how to operate it.

The IMES Marine Rescue Co-ordination Centre (MRCC) at Rosslare contacted Cpt. O'Flaherty at 22:02 to task the helicopter. The inshore lifeboat based at Helvick Head had also been tasked, but as the Helvick lifeboat did not have radar, the helicopter was asked to assist in locating the casualty vessel. By 22:42 Rescue 111 was airborne and headed towards the search area.

At 22:53 Rescue 111 was informed that the larger radar-equipped lifeboat at Ballycotton had also been tasked to assist in the search. By 23:00 the Helvick lifeboat had found the casualty vessel and was starting to tow it to Helvick Pier. Below is an extract of the exchanges between the co-ordination centre and Rescue 111:

MRCC: Helvick Lifeboat has now located the casualty at the following position: 5204.29 and 00729.08, and he is taking him in tow. Ah if the visibility is satisfactory there we’d like you to continue to that position and maybe just monitor it for a while.

R111: Roger we're going to route to that position. We’re going to maintain Five hundred feet overhead the target area. We're still in a lot of cloud, a lot of fog here. We'll remain overhead and if they get into trouble at any stage, we'll, we will descend to the scene, over.

After Rescue 111 arrived on scene, the lifeboat reported that its GPS was not working properly and requested navigational assistance as it towed the casualty vessel back to Helvick Pier. Rescue 111 provided a compass heading towards the pier. At 23:51 the control tower at Waterford Airport contacted Rescue 111 to warn of worsening fog.

Tower: Yeah, just to inform you, weather deteriorating slightly here. Just to let you know.

R111: Roger, copied that er ... can you see the lights of Tramore at all?

Tower: Negative, we can just about hardly see the runway which is a distance of 300 metres from the Tower.

Rescue 111 then requested to be released to return to base. The Helvick lifeboat was less than 1.5 miles from the pier and the radar-equipped Ballycotton lifeboat was standing by to assist.

R111: Rosslare Radio, this is Rescue 111, we're looking for permission to route towards Waterford Airport at this time, the conditions there are deteriorating, we'd like to get in before they close, over.

MRCC: Rescue 111, Rosslare Radio, you can be released and thank you for your help and your co-operation, over.

Helvick Lifeboat: Rescue 111, this is Helvick Lifeboat, thanks for your assistance, have a safe passage home now, over.

R111: Roger, thank you for that, safe passage yourself, over

== Attempted landing and crash ==
Rescue 111 headed for Waterford Airport at 23:54. By 00:12 it was 2.5 nautical miles from the airport. It approached on a heading for Runway 21, approaching over land from the north.

Due to the low visibility, the helicopter was guided by the airport's instrument landing system. The system was capable of guiding aircraft down to a height of 310 feet above the runway. By this point, if the runway lights are not visible the aircraft must abort the landing attempt and initiate the missed approach procedure.

At 00:14 Rescue 111 told the tower it had missed the approach:

R111: Tower, one eleven, we overshot that approach, we're going to go around for one more... As a matter of interest, could you see us at all?

Tower: No, we had (technician name) out on the ramp just keeping an eye for you, he couldn’t see you actually, visibility is about five hundred metres.

Rescue 111 attempted another approach to Runway 21, but again failed to see the runway.

R111: Tower Roger one one, rescue one eleven, we've overshot. We're going to go around for a coastal approach.

The coastal approach procedure would have meant approaching the airport over Tramore Bay and the dunes 4 km south of the airport. This was a procedure which was familiar to the pilots and had been practised that morning. It can make use of the search and rescue modes of the automatic flight control system to maintain an exact height over the sea surface.

The tower switched over the approach lighting to Runway 03, the southern approach to the same runway. However Rescue 111 told the tower "We may land in Tramore", presumably on the beach.

At 00:34 the tower informed Rescue 111 that the weather at Casement Aerodrome was clear if the helicopter wanted to divert to Dublin. Rescue 111 replied "Roger, don’t have the juice", i.e. the helicopter did not enough fuel to divert. At 00:39 Rescue 111 made a brief radio transmission with no audible voice. The tower and MRCC both attempted to contact Rescue 111 in the minutes following, but heard no reply.

An IMES coastal search team assembled at the town end of the beach by 01:30. Conditions remained extremely difficult, with one of the team reporting that the fog made it difficult to see the mobile phone in his hand. At 02:00 they located the wreckage in the dunes, still burning. The bodies of the four crew were found in the wreckage.

== Investigation ==
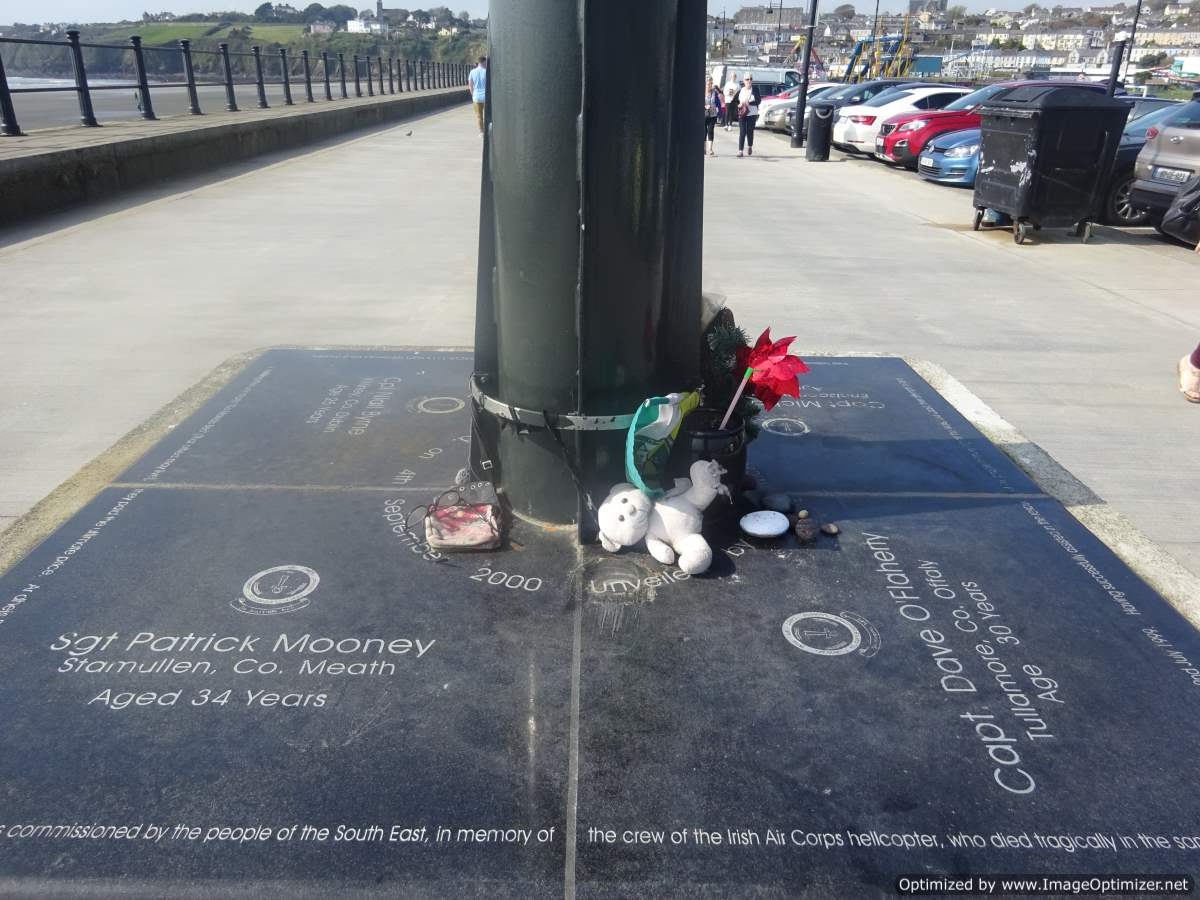
The memorial to the accident at Tramore beach

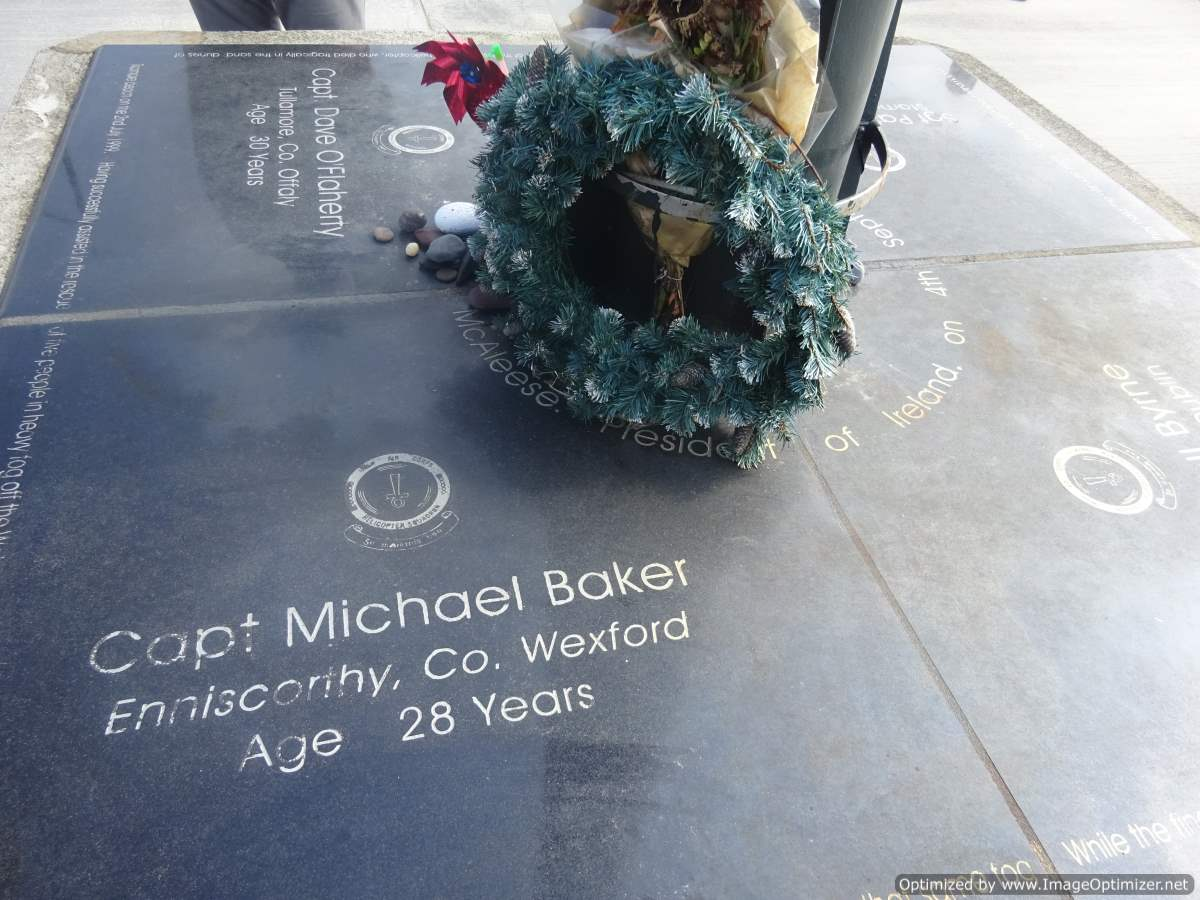
Detail of the accident memorial in Tramore

Under Air Corps procedures, the helicopter was not fitted with a Flight Data Recorder or Cockpit Voice Recorder. The details of the accident were reconstructed based on radio transmissions and examination of the wreckage.

The helicopter impacted the top of the sand dunes, travelling at an estimated speed of 60-80 knots (111-148 km/h) and a heading of 130° (southeast). This is a typical approach speed for landing - below 70 knots the aircraft becomes less stable. The impact was roughly in line with a well-established coastal approach to the airport. The right hand rear door was not locked in either the opened or closed position, suggesting it was in the process of being closed at the time of impact. The radio altimeter "bugs", which are configurable minimum descent altitude warnings, had been set at 160 feet and 150 feet. The bulb for the bug which was set to 160 feet was recovered, and examination showed that it was illuminated at the time of impact. The top of the dune was 45 feet above sea level.

The conclusion of the investigation was that the crew were likely attempting an improvised variation of the established coastal approach, attempting to land on the beach at Tramore rather than at the airport. The intent was probably to approach the beach at a minimum safe altitude of around 200 feet and attempt to visually locate the beach. The rear crew may have had the sliding door open to help locate the beach.

The initial approach was headed northeast, but the impact was made while heading southeast. This suggests that the crew had failed to locate the beach and were closing the sliding door and turning right to perform a go-around. While turning, the helicopter descended below the bugged altitude and hit the sand dune. It could not be established why the aircraft went through the bugged height, which would have produced an audible and visual warning. The pilot may have gained a visual fix on the intended landing area, or may have become disorientated in the fog. By the time of the accident the crew had been on-duty for more than 16 hours which may have affected their performance.

== Fuel load and alternate airports ==
After the second missed approach to Waterford Airport, the tower raised the possibility of diverting to an alternate airport where the visibility was better. However, by this time there was not enough fuel remaining to divert. There is no evidence that the possibility of landing at an alternate airport was considered during planning of the mission.

Rescue 111 did not take off with the maximum possible fuel load of 800 kg. Instead it left with the standard load of 600 kg. This was likely due the rescue point being near the airport, and that it may have needed to hover over the casualty boat to winch off passengers. With a full fuel load the aircraft is difficult to maintain in a hover due the lack of reserve power. The aircraft did have the capability to jettison fuel, allowing it to travel to scene with a larger fuel load and then dump it to lower the weight for winching. However, due to technical concerns about the jettison valves this was not commonly done. An Air Corps Dauphin three years earlier had suffered a failure where both valves failed to close after opening. In that instance the aircraft was able to land safely, but a situation where the flow of fuel out of the valves cannot be stopped while the aircraft is far out at sea is highly dangerous.

Due to the limited range of the Dauphin, planning for alternate airports was not generally considered. The Operation Manual states "it is unlikely that the Dauphin's endurance will allow for a diversion to an alternate." The visibility at Cork Airport (~100km away) and Dublin Airport (~150 km away) was forecast to be similarly poor to Waterford, so planning for an alternate landing site would have ruled these out in any case. Similarly Casement Aerodrome did not have suitable conditions at the planning stage. As noted above it had cleared later in the evening, but by then Rescue 111 did not have enough fuel to reach it.

Shannon Airport (~140km away) did in fact have clear weather forecast, and remained clear throughout the mission period. But after completing the first missed approach to Waterford at 00:14 there would not have been enough fuel remaining to reach Shannon. A decision to divert to Shannon would probably have to have been made before even attempting to land at Waterford.

No air traffic controller was on duty at Waterford Airport that night. The tower was staffed by one of the Air Corps ground crew, who was not an air traffic control operator (ATCO) or aerodrome flight information service operator (AFISO). The report found that a qualified ATCO or AFISO could have supplied a weather briefing which may have influenced the planning of the mission.

== See also ==
- 2017 Irish Coast Guard Rescue 116 crash
