= R708 road (Ireland) =

Road in Ireland

R708 road
- Bóthar R708
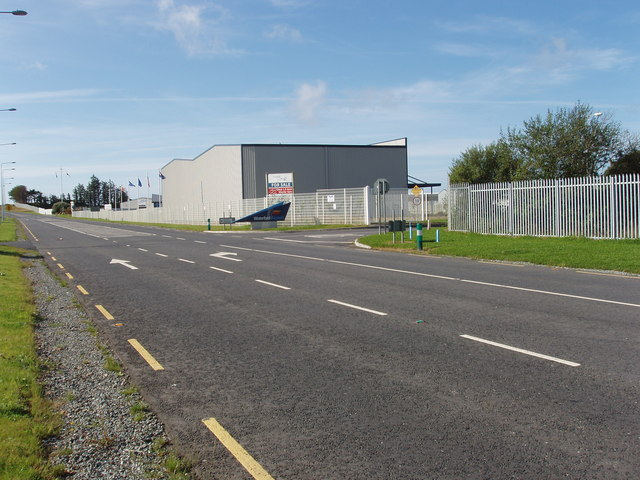
- Waterford Airport entrance from R708

Route information
- Length: 10.3 km (6.4 mi)

Major junctions
- From: R680 at The Mall, Waterford

- R860 at Johns Hill, Waterford; R709 (Inner Ring Road), Waterford; R710 (Outer Ring Road), Waterford

- To: R685 at Kilmacleague West, County Waterford

Location
- Country: Ireland

Highway system
- Roads in Ireland; Motorways; Primary; Secondary; Regional
← R707	→ R709

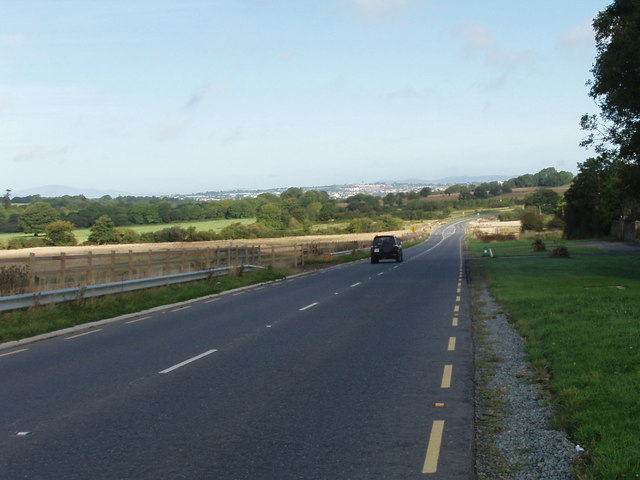
R708 north of Monamintra Roundabout

The R708 road is a regional road in County Waterford, Ireland. It travels from Waterford city centre to Waterford Airport and then to the R685. The road is 10.3 kilometres (6.4 mi) long.
