= R675 road (Ireland) =

Road in Ireland

R675 road
- Bóthar R675
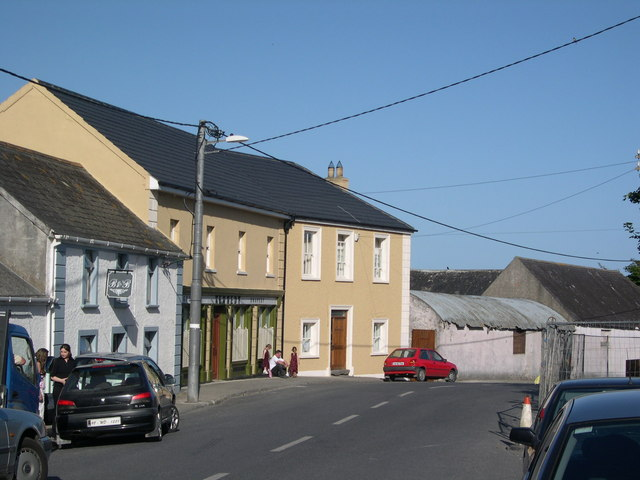
- Bunmahon on the R675

Route information
- Length: 55 km (34 mi)

Location
- Country: Ireland
- Primary destinations: County Waterford; Waterford leave R680 in city centre; Tramore; Fenor; Annestown; Bunmahon; Stradbally; Dungarvan, terminates in town centre

Highway system
- Roads in Ireland; Motorways; Primary; Secondary; Regional

The R675 road is a regional road in Ireland which runs east–west from the R680 in Waterford city centre to the centre of Dungarvan, via Tramore, all in County Waterford. The route is 55 km (34 mi) long.

== See also ==
- Roads in Ireland
