= Ballintogher =

Village in County Sligo, Ireland

Ballintogher Baile an Tóchair
- Village
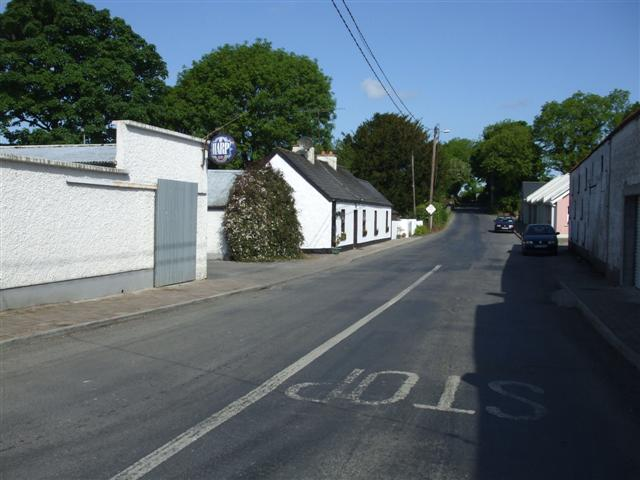
- R290 road at Ballintogher

- Location in Ireland
- Coordinates: 54.201°N 8.365°W
- Country: Ireland
- Province: Connacht
- County: County Sligo
- Elevation: 65 m (213 ft)

Population (2022)
  - Total: 351
- Time zone: UTC+0 (WET)
  - Summer (DST): UTC-1 (IST (WEST))
- Irish Grid Reference: G760280

Ballintogher (Irish: Baile an Tóchair) is a village in County Sligo, Ireland. It is located approximately 8 kilometers southeast of the county town of Sligo on the R290 road between Ballygawley to the west and Dromahair in County Leitrim to the north-east. Known as "The Town of the Causeway", Ballintogher is situated near Lough Gill, and the "Lake Isle of Innisfree" made famous by the poet W. B. Yeats.

Ballintogher was located near the Sligo, Leitrim and Northern Counties Railway, which was begun in the 1870s and closed in 1957. The village had a population of 351 people as of the 2022 census.
