= R291 road (Ireland) =

Road in Ireland

R291 road
- Bóthar R291
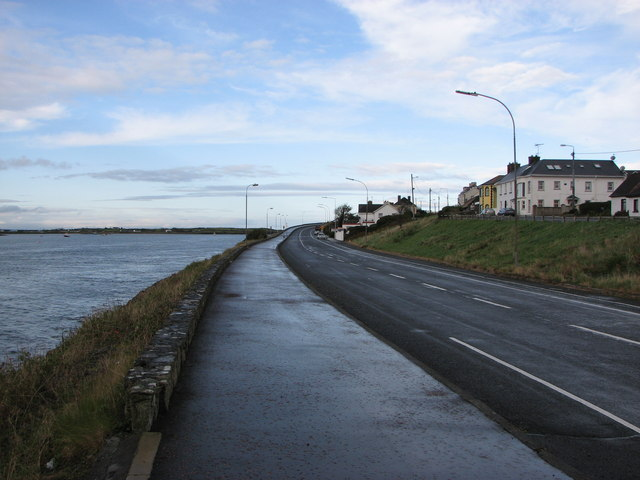
- R291 entering Rosses Point

Route information
- Length: 7.6 km (4.7 mi)

Major junctions
- From: N15 at Sligo
- To: local road L3309 at Rosses Point

Location
- Country: Ireland
- Primary destinations: County Sligo; Sligo; Ballincar; Rosses Point

Highway system
- Roads in Ireland; Motorways; Primary; Secondary; Regional
← R290	→ R292

The R291 road is a regional road in Ireland linking Sligo and Rosses Point in County Sligo. The road is part of the Wild Atlantic Way.

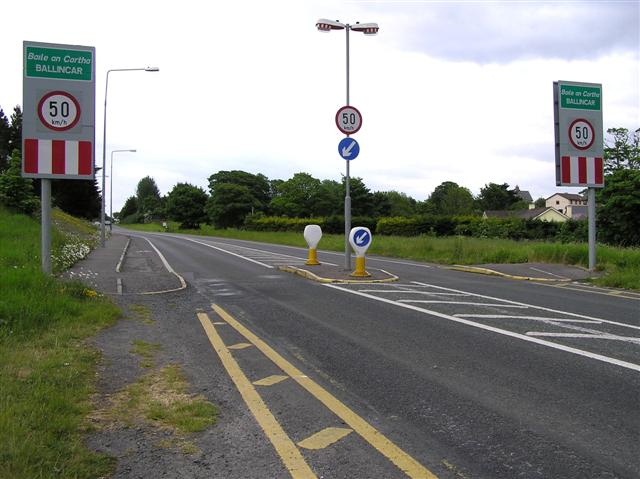
Cycle Lane in Ballincar.

The road travels along the southern coast of the Rosses Point Peninsula via Ballincar. It is 7.6 km (4.7 mi) long.

The Urban Cycle Sligo travel scheme route 006 linking Rosses Point to Scotsmans Walk in Sligo Town with dedicated cycle lanes created on the R291 road.

== See also ==
- Roads in Ireland
