= R278 road (Ireland) =

Road in Ireland

R278 road
- Bóthar R278
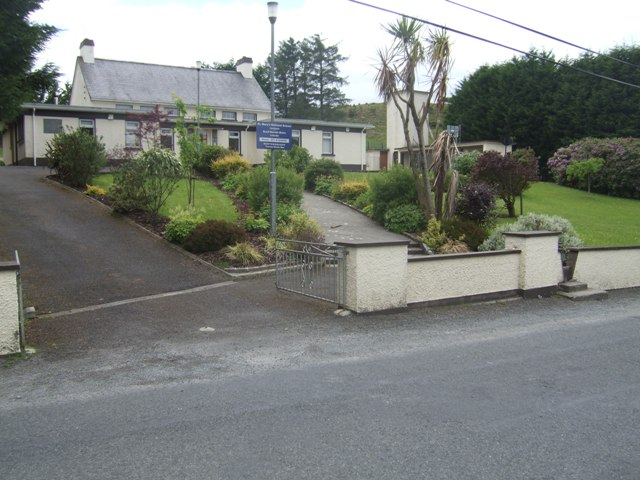
- Leckaun National School, County Leitrim, on the R278

Route information
- Length: 12.6 km (7.8 mi)

Major junctions
- From: R286 at Farnacardy, Sligo
- To: R286 at Cornalaghta, County Leitrim

Location
- Country: Ireland

Highway system
- Roads in Ireland; Motorways; Primary; Secondary; Regional
| ← R277 | → R279 |

The R278 road is a regional road in Ireland. It is a loop road from the R286 road in Counties Sligo and Leitrim.

The R278 goes via Calry in County Sligo and passes by Doon Lough in County Leitrim. It is 12.6 km (7.8 mi) long.

== See also ==
- Roads in Ireland
