= ECY =

ECY may refer to:

- Eteocypriot language, identified by ISO 639-3 code ecy
- ECY Street Records, label that released Green Bullfrog
- ECY, call letters for Infante Isabel which was involved in the sinking of SS Valbanera
- ECY, ICAO code for Euroceltic Airways
- Code of Washington State Department of Ecology
- East Cape York, a region of Integrated Marine and Coastal Regionalisation of Australia
