= R292 road (Ireland) =

Road in Ireland

R292 road
- Bóthar R292
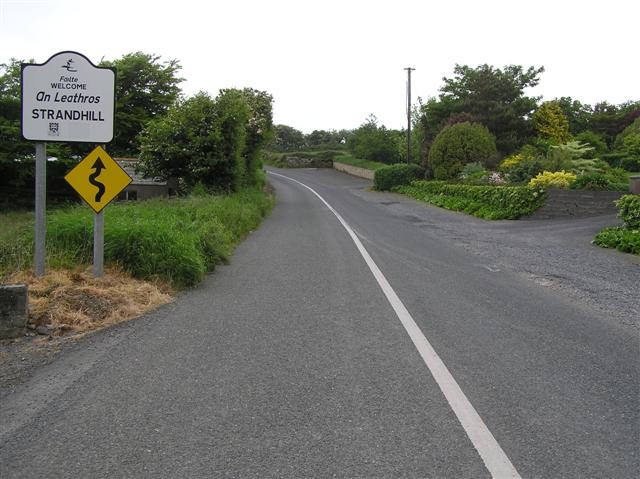
- R292 road northbound into Strandhill

Location
- Country: Ireland
- Primary destinations: County Sligo; Connects to R286 at Hyde Bridge Sligo (westbound only); Connects to R287 (eastbound commences); Crosses N4 road in Sligo; Unlabelled road to Coney Island (via causeway); Strandhill - (R277 Road to Sligo Airport); Terminates at the N4 road/N59 road junction 1.5 km (0.93 mi) north of Ballysadare

Highway system
- Roads in Ireland; Motorways; Primary; Secondary; Regional

The R292 road is a regional road in Ireland that runs from Sligo town via Strandhill to Ballysadare, all in County Sligo. A more direct road from Sligo to Ballysadare is available using the N4 road.

The Urban Cycle Sligo travel scheme route 001 links Strandhill to Sligo Town with dedicated cycle lanes created on the R292 road. The road loops around the coast of the Coolera Peninsula.

== See also ==
- Roads in Ireland
- National primary road
- National secondary road
