= Baile Uí Dhálaigh =

Baile Uí Dhálaigh (Irish for 'Ó Dálaigh's town') may refer to several places on the island of Ireland:

- Ballygawley, County Tyrone, Northern Ireland, a village
  - Ballynasaggart Friary, a c. 16th century Franciscan friary near the village — see List of monastic houses in County Tyrone
- Dalystown, County Westmeath, Republic of Ireland, a village
- Ballygawley, County Sligo, Republic of Ireland, a village
- A townland in County Londonderry, Northern Ireland — see List of townlands in County Londonderry
