= R284 road (Ireland) =

Road in Ireland

R284 road
- Bóthar R284
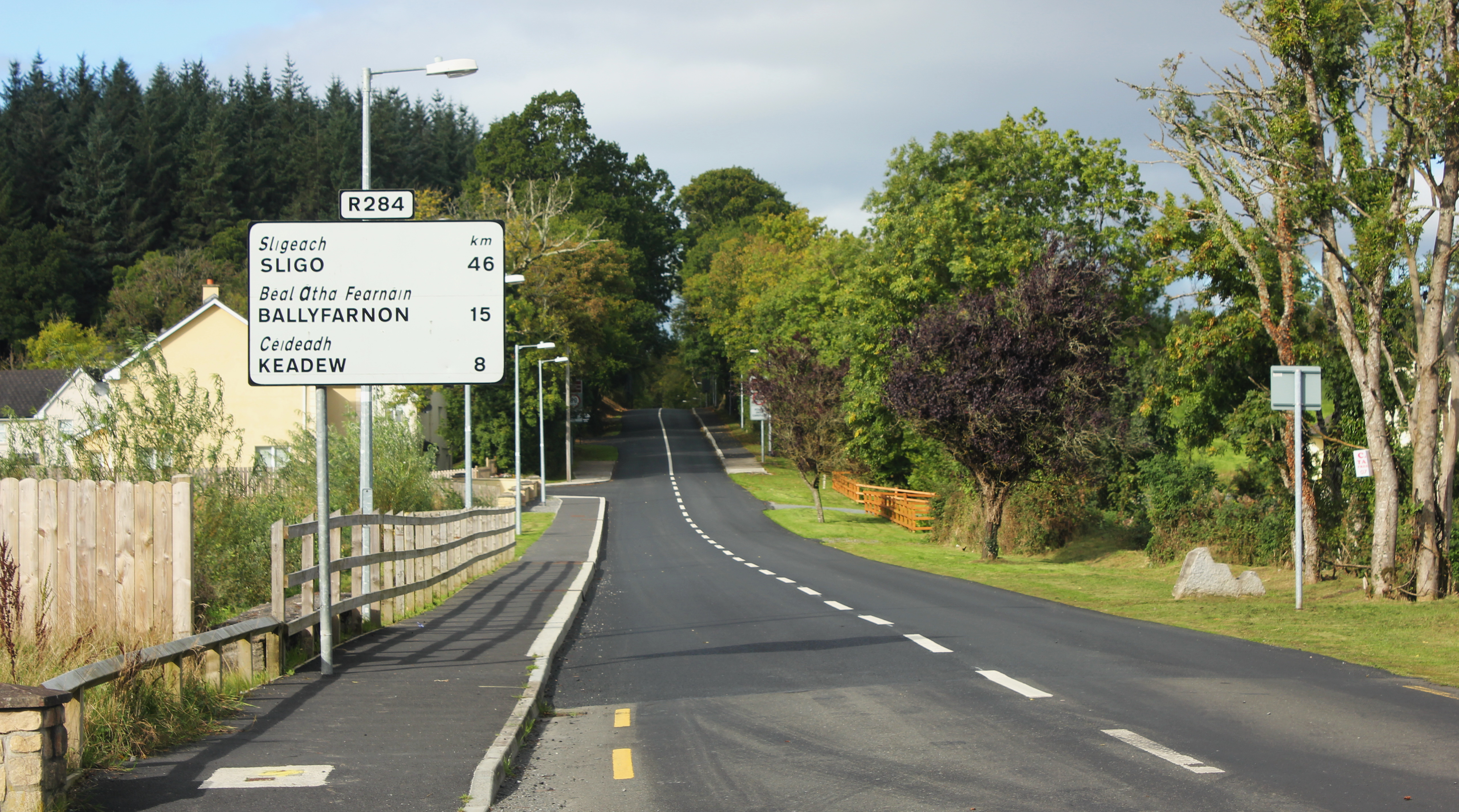
- The R284 leaving Leitrim village

Route information
- Length: 46 km (29 mi)

Location
- Country: Ireland
- Primary destinations: County Sligo; Sligo – Starts in Town Centre; (R287); Ballygawley – (R290); Sooey; Geevagh; County Roscommon; Ballyfarnan; Keadue – joins/leaves R285; Crosses the River Shannon; County Leitrim; Leitrim – terminates at the R280

Highway system
- Roads in Ireland; Motorways; Primary; Secondary; Regional

The R284 road is a regional road in Ireland linking Sligo to Leitrim village in County Leitrim. En route it passes through Ballygawley, Ballyfarnan, Geevagh and Keadue. The road is 46 km (29 mi) long.

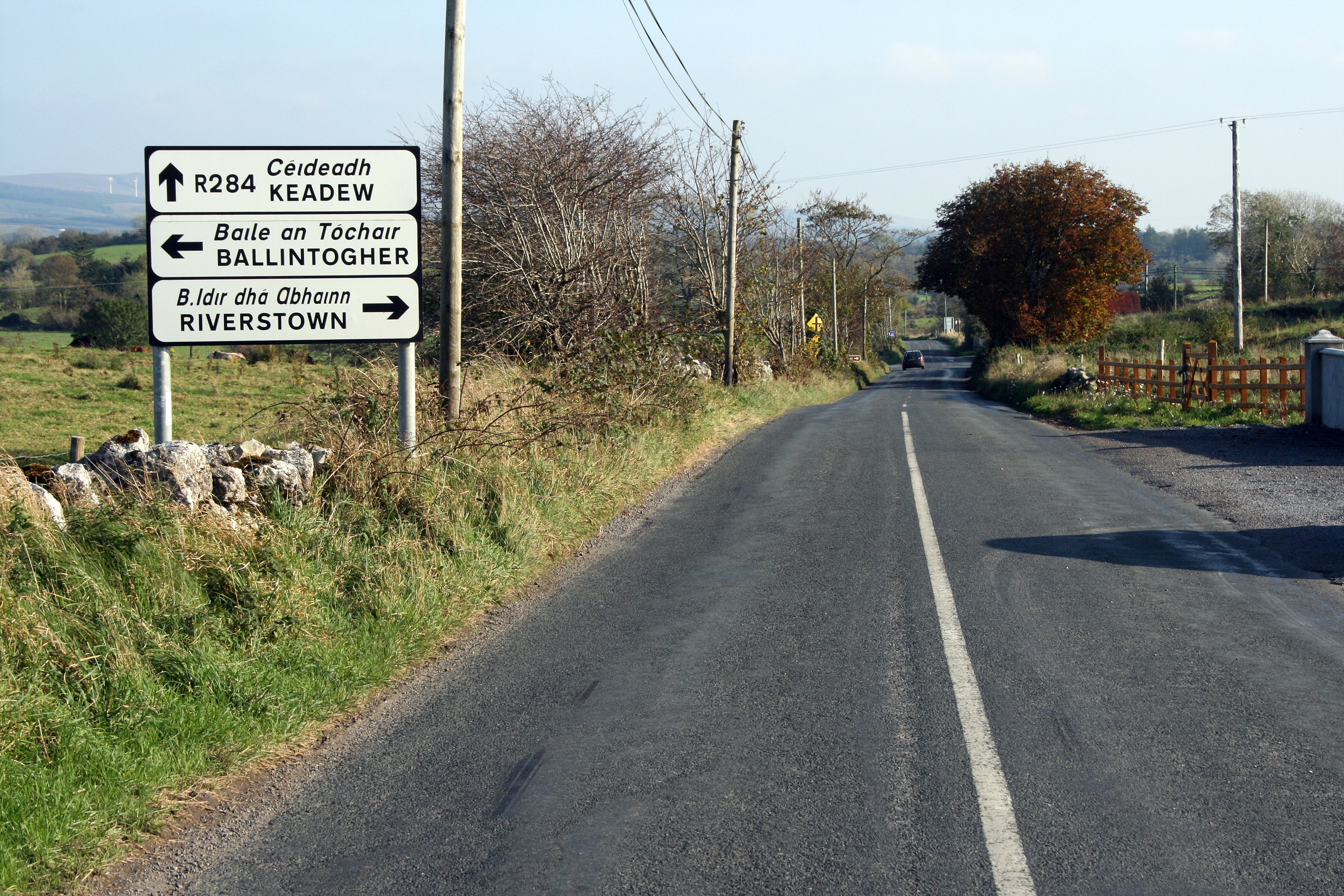
R284 at Coola crossroads

== Official description ==
The official description of the R284 from the Roads Act 1993 (Classification of Regional Roads) Order 2006 reads:

Carrowroe, County Sligo - Leitrim, County Leitrim

Between its junction with N4 at Tonaforte and its junction with R287 at Carraroe all in the county of Sligo
- and -
between its junction with R287 at Carrowroe in the county of Sligo and its junction with R280 at Leitrim in the county of Leitrim via Drumaskibbole, Ballygawley, Sooey, Conway's Cross and Geevagh in the county of Sligo: Ballyfarnan, Keadew West Keadew and Drumboylan in the county of Roscommon: and Drumhierny in the county of Leitrim.

== See also ==
- Roads in Ireland
- National primary road
- National secondary road
