= Ballygawley =

Ballygawley may refer to several places on the island of Ireland:

- Ballygawley, County Donegal, Republic of Ireland, a townland; see List of townlands of County Donegal
- Ballygawley, County Londonderry, Northern Ireland, a townland
- Ballygawley, County Sligo, Republic of Ireland, a village
- Ballygawley, County Tyrone, Northern Ireland, a village
