= R280 =

R280 may refer to:

- R280 road, a regional road in County Leitrim, Ireland
- A variant of the Mercedes-Benz R-Class car
