= Sooey =

Village in County Sligo, Ireland

Coordinates: 54°09′56″N 8°23′33″W

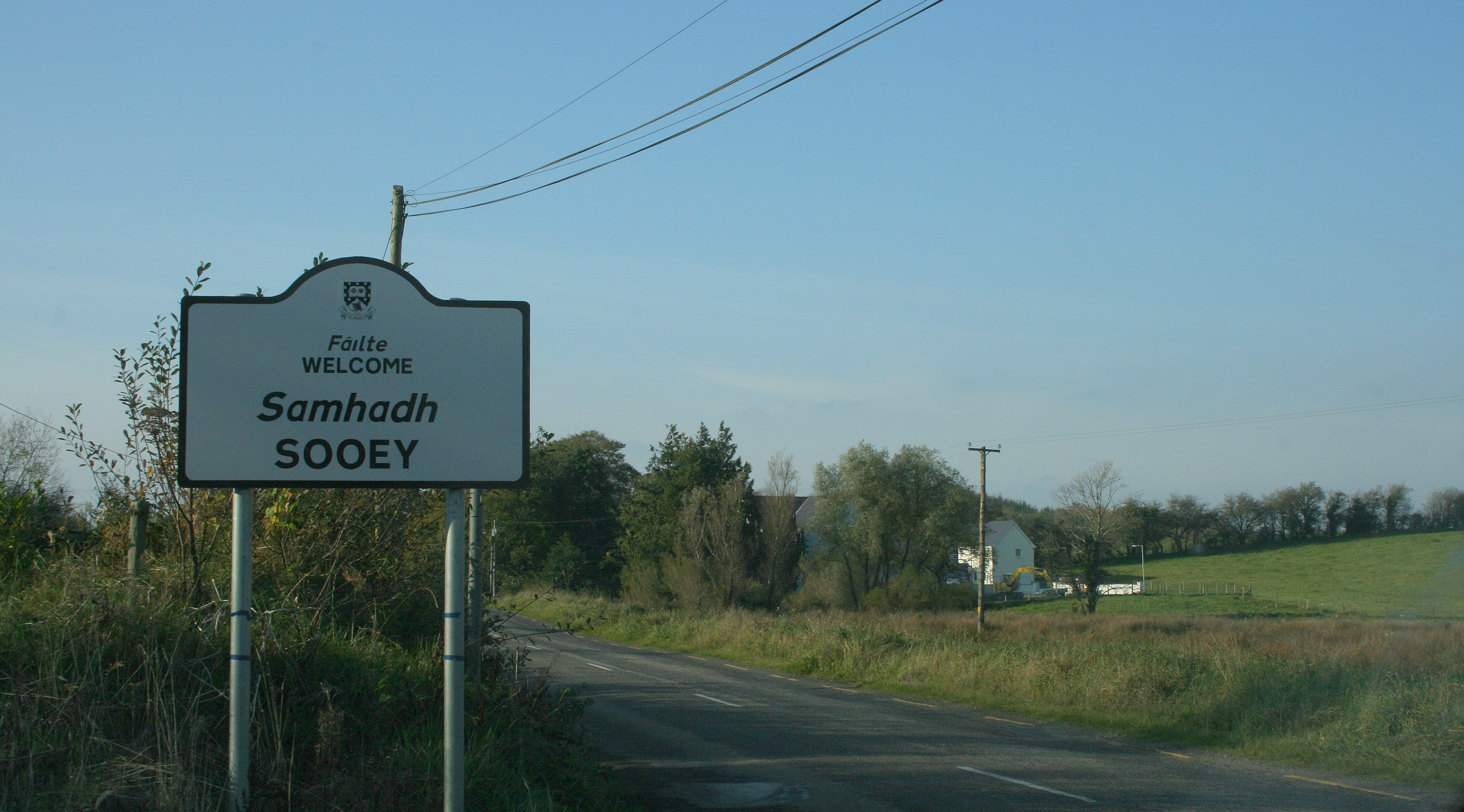
Sign on the road into the village

Sooey (Irish: Samhadh, meaning abounding in the plant sorrel), is a village in County Sligo in Ireland. The village is situated near Riverstown, on the R284 road which runs between Sligo and Leitrim village in County Leitrim.

It is the burial place of Provisional Irish Republican Army volunteer, Kevin Coen.

The village has its own church, primary school and community hall. Coola Post Primary School is located just outside Sooey village.

== See also ==
- List of towns and villages in Ireland
