= Dromahair =

Village in County Leitrim, Ireland

Dromahair Droim Dhá Thiar
- Village
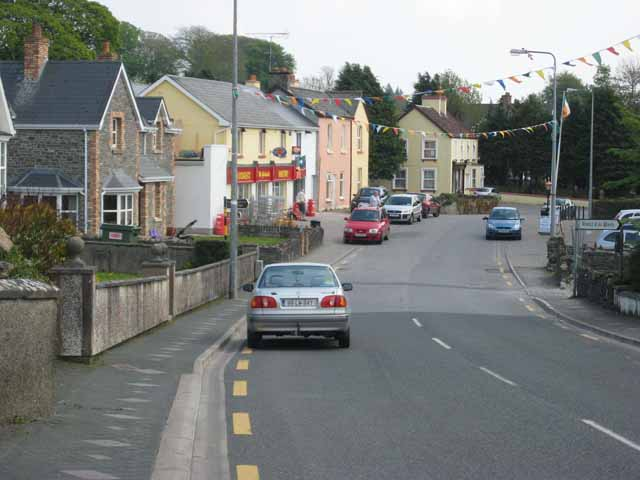
- Main Street

- Location in Ireland
- Coordinates: 54°14′00″N 8°18′00″W
- Country: Ireland
- Province: Connacht
- County: County Leitrim
- Barony: Drumahaire
- Elevation: 51 m (167 ft)

Population (2016)
  - Total: 808
- Irish Grid Reference: G804316

Dromahair (Irish: Droim Dhá Thiar, meaning 'ridge of (the) two demons') is a village in County Leitrim, Ireland. Dromahair is 10 km (6 mi) from Manorhamilton and 17 km (10 mi) from Sligo town.

== Geography ==
Dromahair lies in the hilly north west of County Leitrim amid some stunning unspoiled natural landscapes. The "Sleeping Giant" mountain formation (comprising Keelogyboy, Leean and Benbo) is visible on approaches to the village, as is Lough Gill below the Slieve Daeáne and Killerry mountain. The village itself is also idyllic, located on the banks of the River Bonet, which flows into Lough Gill. Much of Dromahair was modelled on a village in Somerset by the Earl of Leitrim, and the central streetscape still follows the pattern set down by him.

== History ==
The village takes its name from the ridge of high ground on which it is located above the Bonet River. The ridge was the site of the important early church site of Drumlease, a Patrician foundation of the fifth century AD. The name in Irish is Droim Dhá Ethiar, meaning apparently the "Ridge of Two (Air) Demons".

During the medieval period, Dromahair was the capital of Breifne - a Gaelic confederation that stretched from Kells in County Meath across County Cavan and north County Leitrim to County Sligo. It was the seat of the O'Rourkes - the ancient Kings of Brieifne. The ruins of the O'Rourke castle (built c. 950 AD) and banqueting hall are present in the village. On the ruins of this ancient site now fourteen holiday cottages have been built. It is also the place from which Devorgilla (wife of Tiernan O'Rourke) was abducted by Dermot McMurrough (the King of Leinster) in 1153 to Ferns, an act which brought about a feud and McMurrough's eventual exile from Ireland.

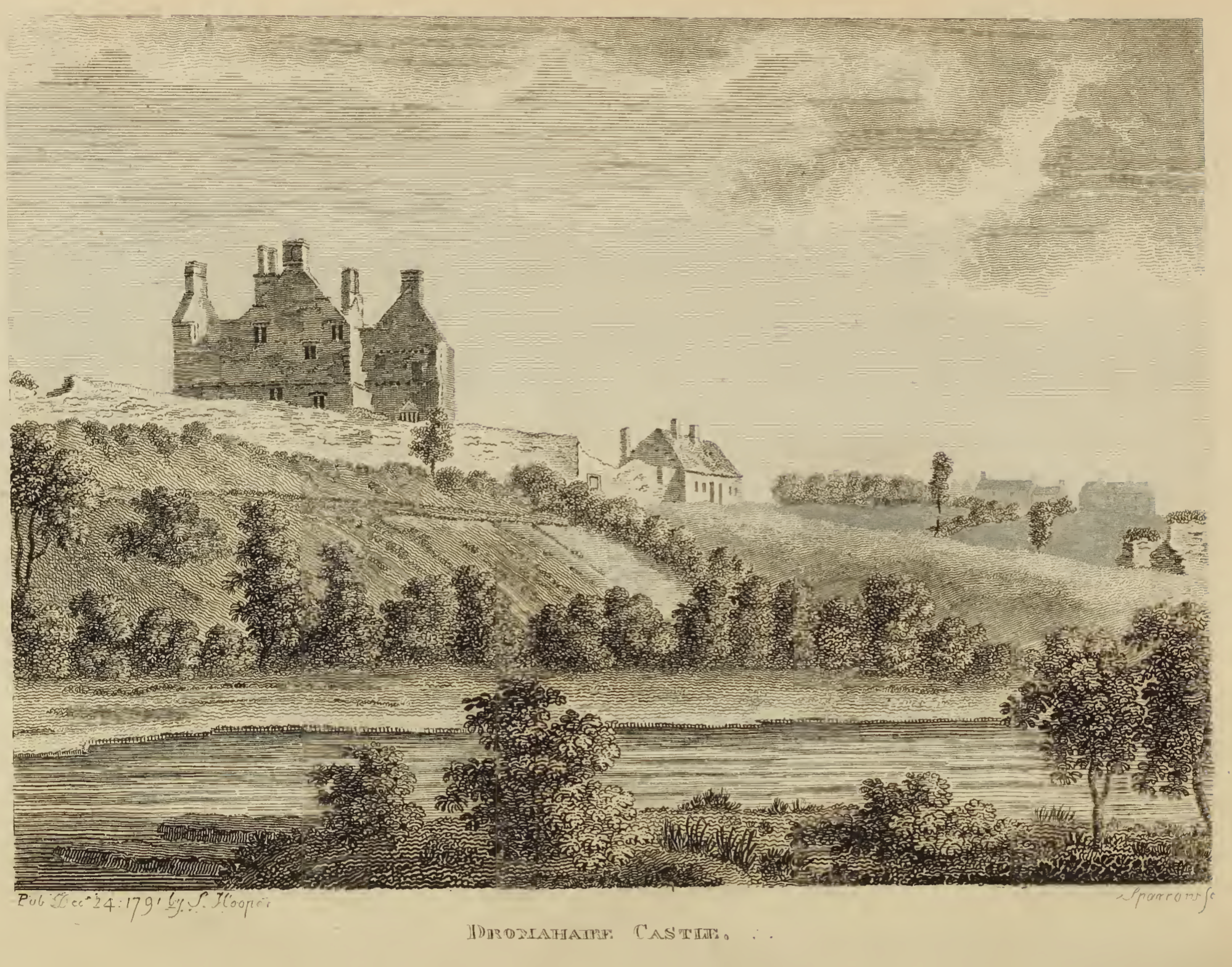
Drumahaire Castle 1791

Creevelea Abbey, located on the outskirts of the village, is a Franciscan Friary which was founded as a daughter foundation of Donegal Abbey in 1508 and was in use until the 17th century when the Franciscans were forced to leave by the New Model Army. The nave, choir, tower and transept are well preserved and it is now protected as a national monument. In addition, a fortified house constructed for Sir William Villiers (c. 1629) is located in the village. In 1798 General Humbert led Irish and French forces to defeat the British at battles in Castlebar and at Carricknagat near Collooney. Humbert's forces were then pursued through Leitrim to Longford. His army is known to have rested in Dromahair and captured British artillery was thrown into the Bonet to allow faster movement of the army.

Dromahair was connected to the railway network until the late 1950s. The railway station opened on 1 September 1881 as part of the Sligo, Leitrim and Northern Counties Railway connecting Sligo and Enniskillen. It closed on 1 October 1957 with the closure of the line.

William Butler Yeats used to visit the town regularly to meet the parish priest. He refers to that priest in his poem "The old priest Peter Gilligan" and to Dromahair in "The man who dreamed of Faeryland":

He stood among a crowd at Dromahair
His heart hung all upon a silken dress
And he had known at last some tenderness
Before earth took him to her stony care...

The historic Abbey Manor hotel, refurbished and re-opened in 2004 by Charlie McCreevy, the then finance minister, was abruptly closed in 2009 and abandoned to the elements. The owners went into hiding and attempts by various concerned groups and individuals to track them down have so far (2015) proved unsuccessful. The building has been subject to vandalism and theft since its closure, the lead has been removed from the roof, and the valuable paintings stolen. After an attempt was made to burn the building down, a Section 59 notice (notice to require works to be carried out by the owners) was put into effect on the hotel in July 2015.

Through at least the 19th and 20th centuries, four annual fairs were held at Dromahair on- 1 January, 15 June, 21 July, and 31 October (or 1 November).

== Local amenities and attractions ==
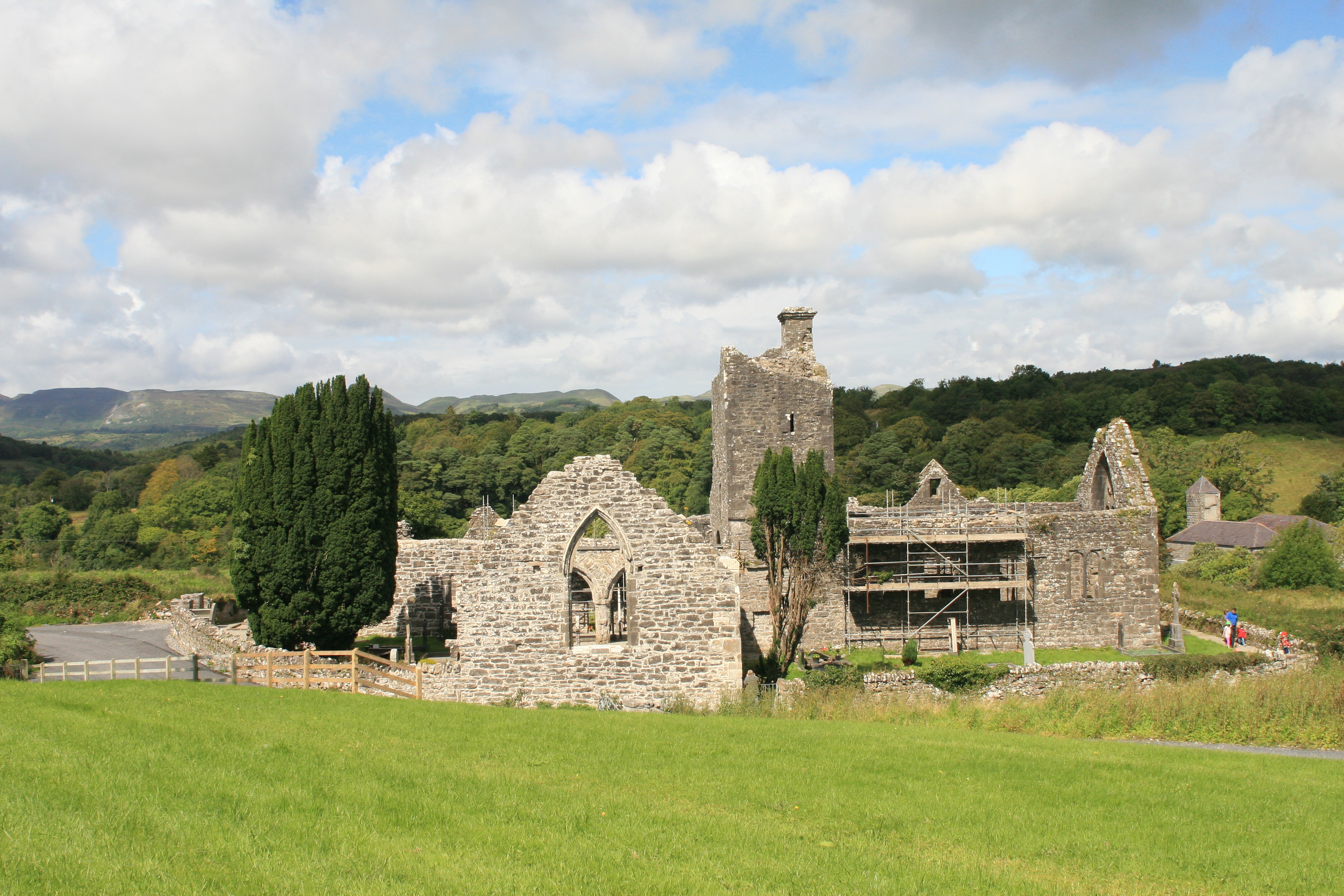
Creevelea Abbey

Dromahair has several pubs and restaurants. It also contains a post office, hotel and public library, a few convenience stores and general shops, hairdressers, butchers, garage, national school, two historic churches (Roman Catholic and Church of Ireland) as well as a health centre. Tourist attractions include Creevelea Abbey, the Tour De Humbert Cycling Trail (which passes through the village), Ard Nahoo Health Farm, Parke's Castle situated beside Lough Gill on the Sligo-Dromahair road (R286, 5 km (3 mi) NW of the village) and the Wild Rose Waterbus which offers tours of Lough Gill between Sligo and Parke's Castle.

== Sports ==
Dromahair has both men's and ladies' GAA clubs. In 2009, the men's club competed in RTÉ's Celebrity Bainisteoir competition under comedian Katherine Lynch, getting to the final of the competition.

== Transport ==
The R287 road links Dromahair west to Sligo town and Collooney, or east to Manorhamilton via the R280. The R288 is an alternative route to Sligo, north of Lough Gill via the R286.

Bus Éireann routes serving Dromahair include the 462, 469 and 470 which link with Sligo, Drumkeeran, Manorhamilton, Carrick on Shannon and Longford. The nearest station is Sligo railway station.

== Schools ==
Drumlease National School is approximately two miles from Lough Gill. The school is under the patronage of the Catholic Bishop of Kilmore, and it underwent a Whole School Evaluation by the inspectorate of the Department of Education in 2013. The Old "Drumlease National School" in the townland of the same name was found to be unsuitable for the children of Dromahair by Rev. Cormac McSharry and it was replaced by him in 1901. In 1959, a Western plot was approved as an extension to the school site, which was opened in 1969.

== See also ==
- List of towns and villages in Ireland
- Sligo, Leitrim and Northern Counties Railway
- Breifne
