= O'Rourke's Castle =

Ruined castle in County Leitrim, Ireland

- Location within Ireland

General information
- Location: Leitrim Village, County Leitrim, Ireland
- Coordinates: 53°59′28″N 8°03′52″W
- Construction started: late 15th century
- Demolished: 1580 (Bawn wall remains)
- Client: Brian Ballach O'Rourke; MacRaghnall

O'Rourke's Castle (historically also Breifny Castle) is a ruined castle in Ireland. It was situated in the centre of Leitrim Village c. 30m from the N bank of the Ballinamore and Ballyconnell canal, which at this point is a canalised stream, and c. 400m from its junction with the River Shannon.

== History ==
The castle, undoubtedly a tower house, was originally a MacRaghnall stronghold with references in 1491 and 1499, but by 1540 it was in the hands of Brian Ballach O'Rourke (AFM), probably to intimidate the MacRaghnall and other families of Muintir Eolais and to harass his enemy of the moment, Mac Dermot of Moylurg. The castle was destroyed in 1580 by Brian of the Ramparts O'Rourke to prevent it falling to Sir Nicholas Malby. Sir Nicholas rebuilt and garrisoned it, but the castle was immediately besieged by O'Rourke and abandoned by its garrison shortly afterwards (AFM).

In January 1603, after the defeat of Kinsale, Donal Cam O'Sullivan Beare arrived at Leitrim Castle with only thirty five from the thousand or so followers with whom he had started the long march from Dunboy, County Cork. Brian Óg O'Rourke, who was the last leader to remain in rebellion, was finally besieged at Leitrim Castle. In April Brian Óg fled to Rosa-Iarla Friary near Lough Corrib, where he died in January 1604.

== Modern day ==
A length of mortared uncoursed limestone masonry (L 13m; H 2.8m; T 0.8m) survives with two small openings (dims 0.3m x 0.25m) which may be part of the bawn wall. Archaeological testing (04E0160) of an extensive area just to the NE produced no related material (Read 2007). (McParlan 1802, 103-4; Lewis vol. 1, 837, vol. 2, 256; O'Flanagan 1929, 105-6; Herity 2012, 402)
