= R299 road (Ireland) =

Road in Ireland

R299 road
- Bóthar R299
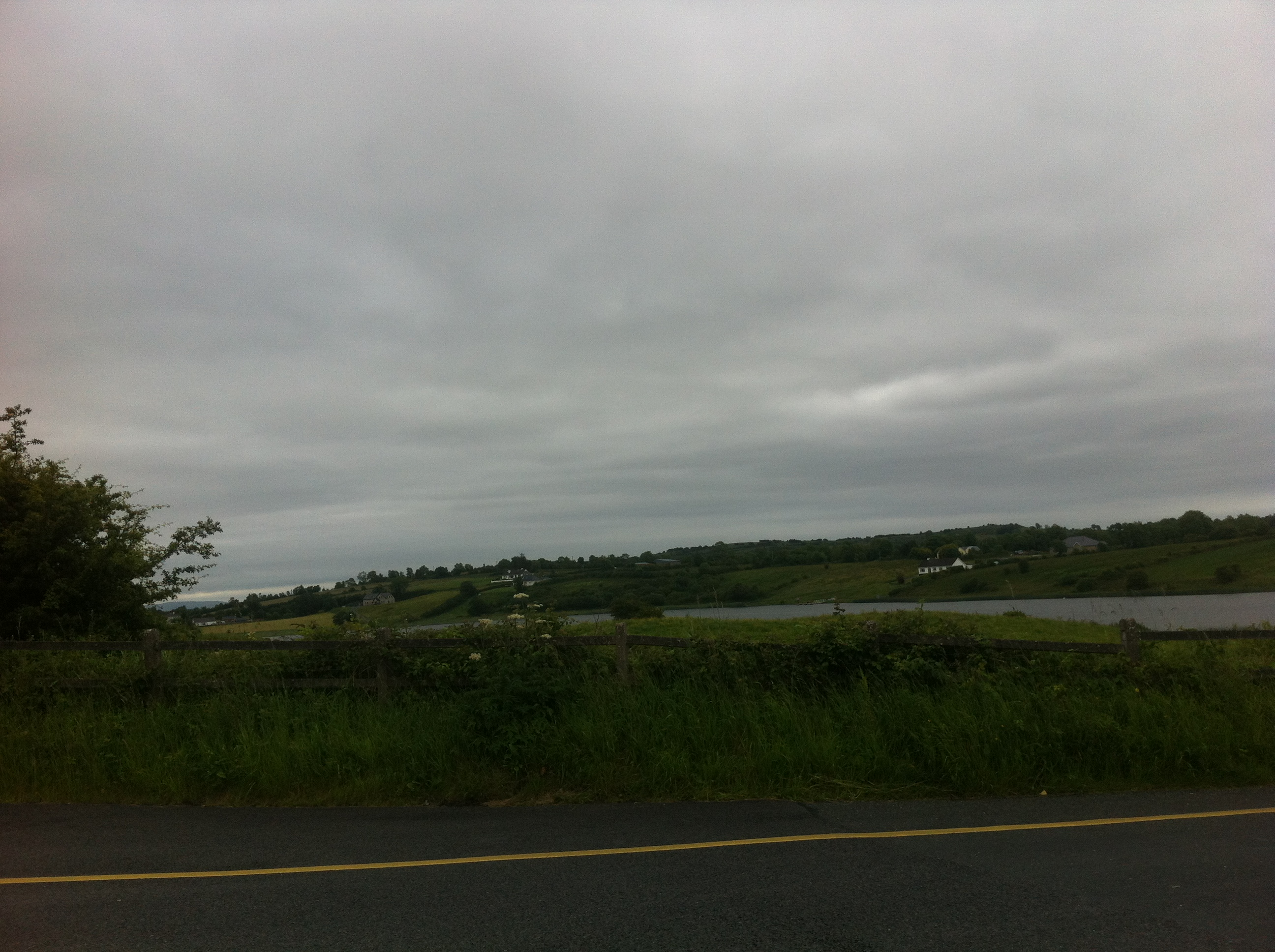
- Bran Lough, County Leitrim, from the R299

Route information
- Length: 7.8 km (4.8 mi)

Major junctions
- From: N4 at Drumsna, County Leitrim
- To: R280 at Drumheckil

Location
- Country: Ireland

Highway system
- Roads in Ireland; Motorways; Primary; Secondary; Regional

The R299 road is a regional road in Ireland linking the N4 and R280 roads in County Leitrim. The road is 7.8 kilometres (4.8 mi) long northbound, shorter southbound.

== See also ==
- Roads in Ireland
