= Ballincar =

Village in County Sligo, Ireland

Ballincar Baile an Chartha
- Village
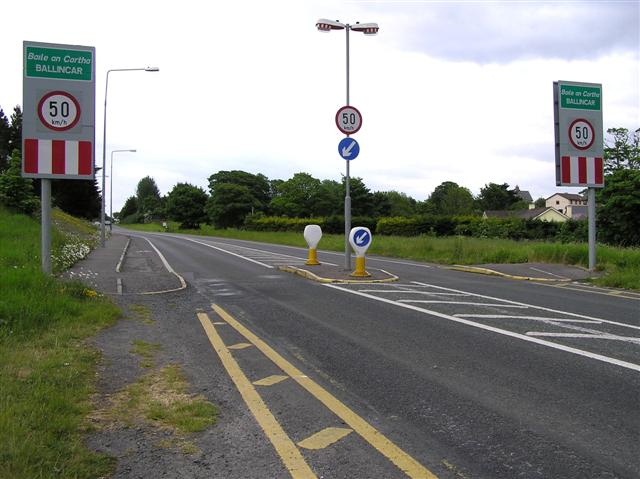
- The R291 regional road passes through Ballincar

- Location in Ireland
- Coordinates: 54°17′53″N 8°30′00″W
- Country: Ireland
- Province: Connacht
- County: County Sligo

Population (2022)
  - Total: 423
- Time zone: UTC+0 (WET)
  - Summer (DST): UTC-1 (IST (WEST))
- Irish Grid Reference: G674389

Ballincar (Irish: Baile an Chartha) is a small village and townland in County Sligo, Ireland. The townland is in the civil parish of Drumcliff, and has an area of approximately 1.6 square kilometres (0.62 sq mi). It is a largely linear coastal settlement which overlooks Sligo Bay and lies on the R291 regional road between Sligo town and Rosses Point. As of the 2022 census, the census town of Ballincar had a population of 423 people, practically unchanged since 2016.

Evidence of ancient settlement in the area includes a number of ringfort, barrow and midden sites. The ruin of a semi-fortified house, recorded in the Record of Monuments and Places as a "plantation casle" and previously associated with the Griffith family, is also in Ballincar townland.

Ballincar is located close to Sligo town, and the Radisson Blu Hotel Sligo is located in the townland. According to Sligo County Council's 2017 development plan, there were "no community facilities in the village" with services "provided in neighbouring settlements" including Rosses Point and Sligo.
