= R289 road (Ireland) =

Road in Ireland

R289 road
- Bóthar R289

Route information
- Length: 5.9 km (3.7 mi)

Major junctions
- From: R287 at Cleen, County Leitrim
- To: R280 at Corderry

Location
- Country: Ireland

Highway system
- Roads in Ireland; Motorways; Primary; Secondary; Regional

The R289 road is a regional road in Ireland linking the R287 and the R280 in County Leitrim. The road is 5.9 km (3.7 mi) long.

== See also ==
- Roads in Ireland
