= Largydonnell =

Village in County Leitrim, Ireland

Largydonnell Learga Uí Dhónaill
- Village
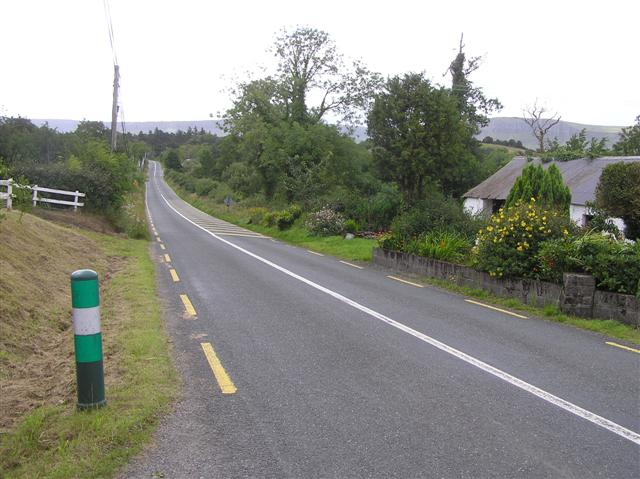
- The R280 passes through Largydonnell

- Location in Ireland
- Coordinates: 54°24′40″N 8°19′10″W
- Country: Ireland
- Province: Connacht
- County: County Leitrim

Area
  - Total: 2.9 km^{2} (1.1 sq mi)
- Elevation: 99 m (325 ft)
- Time zone: UTC+0 (WET)
  - Summer (DST): UTC-1 (IST (WEST))
- Irish Grid Reference: G793514

Largydonnell (Irish: Learga Uí Dhónaill, meaning 'hillside of Ó Dónaill') is a village on the R280 regional road in the north of County Leitrim in Ireland.

== Transport ==
Bus Éireann Fridays-only route 495 (Ballyshannon-Bundoran-Kinlough-Manorhamilton) serves the village twice in each direction.

== History ==
Nearby to Largydonnell Post Office at the hump-backed bridge, on a road to the right in Ahanlish, are the ruins of an old forge where De Cuellar, a survivor of the wreck of the Spanish Armada at Tullaghan, spent some time before proceeding to MacClancy's Castle, located on an islet in Lough Melvin in the townland of Rosclogher, where he remained for three months.

== See also ==
- List of towns and villages in Ireland
