= R290 road (Ireland) =

Road in Ireland

R290 road
- Bóthar R290
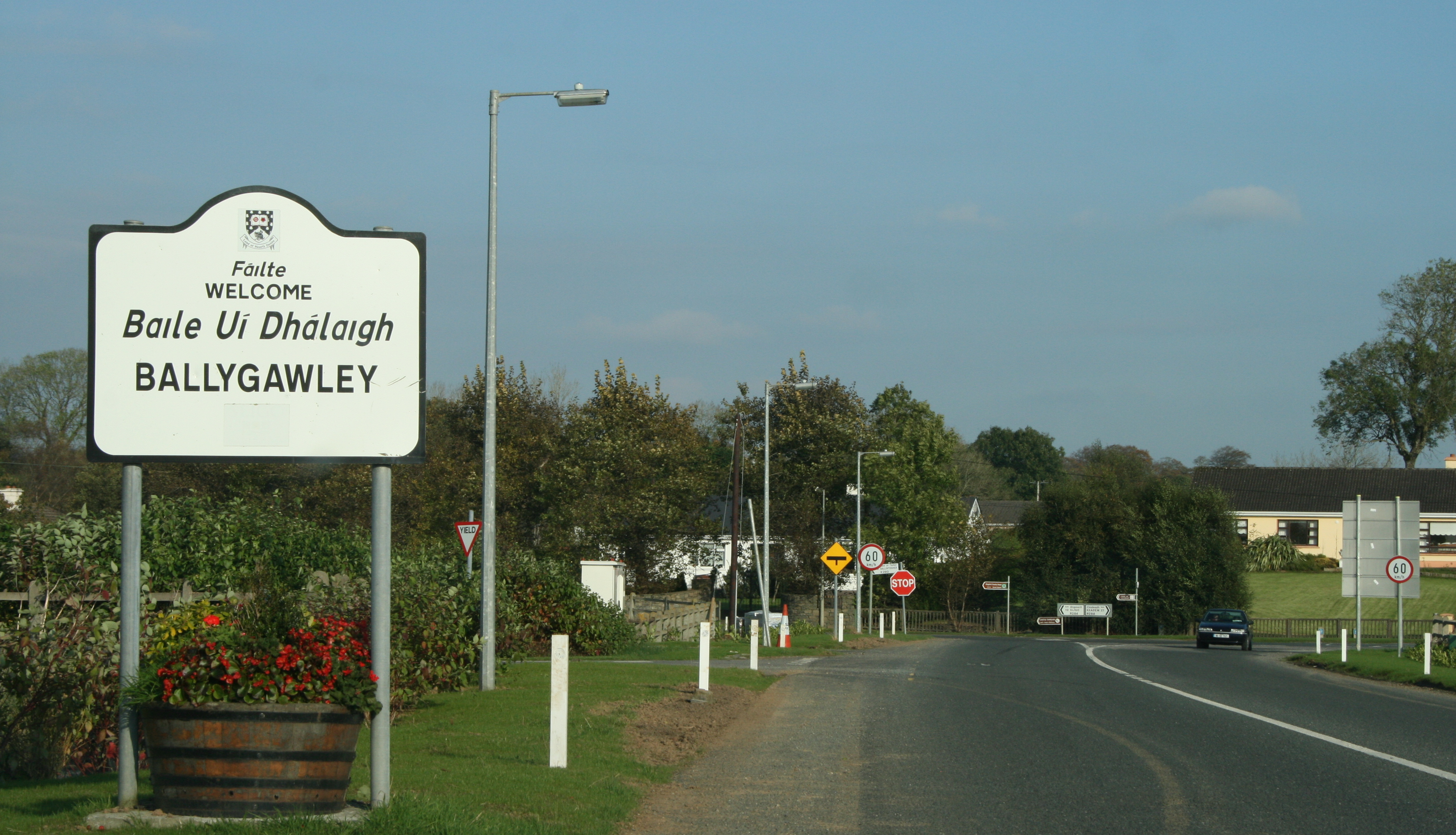
- R290 entering Ballygawley

Route information
- Length: 14.7 km (9.1 mi)

Major junctions
- From: R287 at Gortlownan, County Sligo
- R284 at Ballygawley; N4 at Collooney
- To: N59 at Ballysadare

Location
- Country: Ireland

Highway system
- Roads in Ireland; Motorways; Primary; Secondary; Regional

The R290 road is a regional road in Ireland linking the R287 and the N59 in County Sligo.

From the R287, the road goes west via Ballintogher before reaching Ballygawley and briefly joining the R284. From Ballygawley, the road continues west to the N4 and Collooney. From Collooney the road follows the route of the former N4 before reaching the N59 at Ballysadare. The R290 is 14.7 km (9.1 mi) long.

== See also ==
- Roads in Ireland
