= R288 road (Ireland) =

Regional road in County Leitrim, Ireland

R288 road
- Bóthar R288
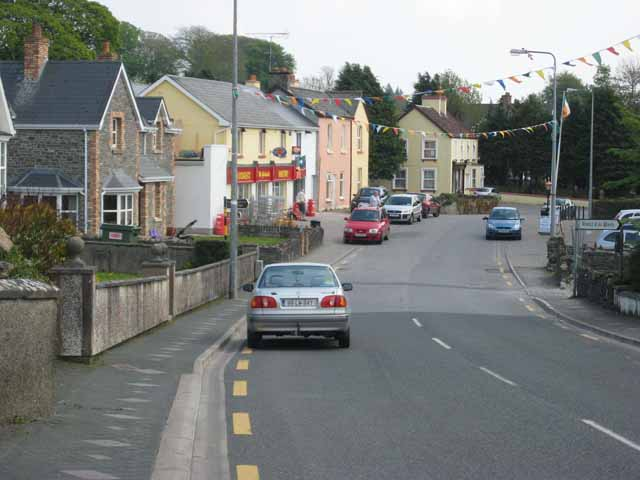
- Main Street, Dromahair on the R288

Route information
- Length: 5.6 km (3.5 mi)

Major junctions
- From: R287 at Ardakip Beg, Dromahair
- Crosses River Bonet; Becomes Main Street, Dromahair; Shore of Lough Gill at Greenaun North
- To: R286 at Sriff, County Leitrim

Location
- Country: Ireland

Highway system
- Roads in Ireland; Motorways; Primary; Secondary; Regional

The R288 road is a regional road in Ireland. It connects the R287 and R286 roads in County Leitrim.

The R288 proceeds north via Dromahair and later along the southeast shore of Lough Gill before ending at the R286. It is 5.6 km (3.5 mi) long.

== See also ==
- Roads in Ireland
