= R286 road (Ireland) =

Road in Ireland

R286 road
- Bóthar R286
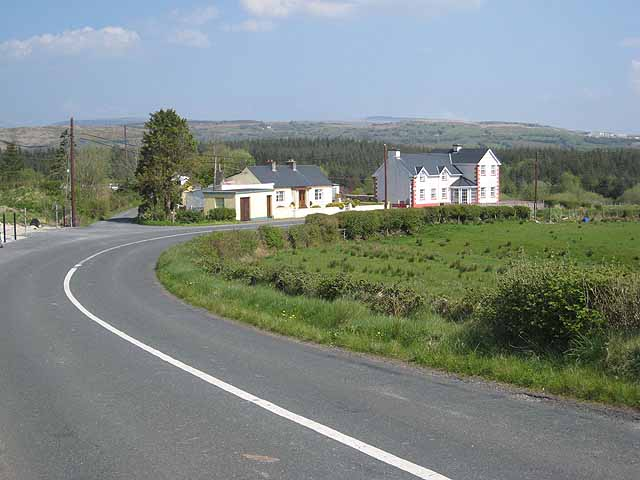
- In County Leitrim near the N16

Route information
- Length: 23.4 km (14.5 mi)

Major junctions
- From: R870 at Teeling Street, Sligo
- N16 at Molloway Hill in Sligo; R278 at Farnacardy, Sligo; Enter County Leitrim; R288 at Sriff; R278 at Cornalaghta
- To: N16 at Pollboy

Location
- Country: Ireland

Highway system
- Roads in Ireland; Motorways; Primary; Secondary; Regional
| ← R285 | → R287 |

The R286 road is a regional road in Ireland. It is largely a loop road from the N16 linking Sligo and north County Leitrim.

In Sligo, the road passes Sligo University Hospital on The Mall. Leaving Sligo, the road goes east via Hazelwood, St. Angela's College and Colgagh Lough before reaching the north shore of Lough Gill and entering County Leitrim. The road passes Parke's Castle before turning northeast to end at the N16. The R286 is 23.4 km (14.5 mi) long.

== See also ==
- Roads in Ireland
