= Parke's Castle =

- Caisleán Parke, Caisleán Uí Ruairc
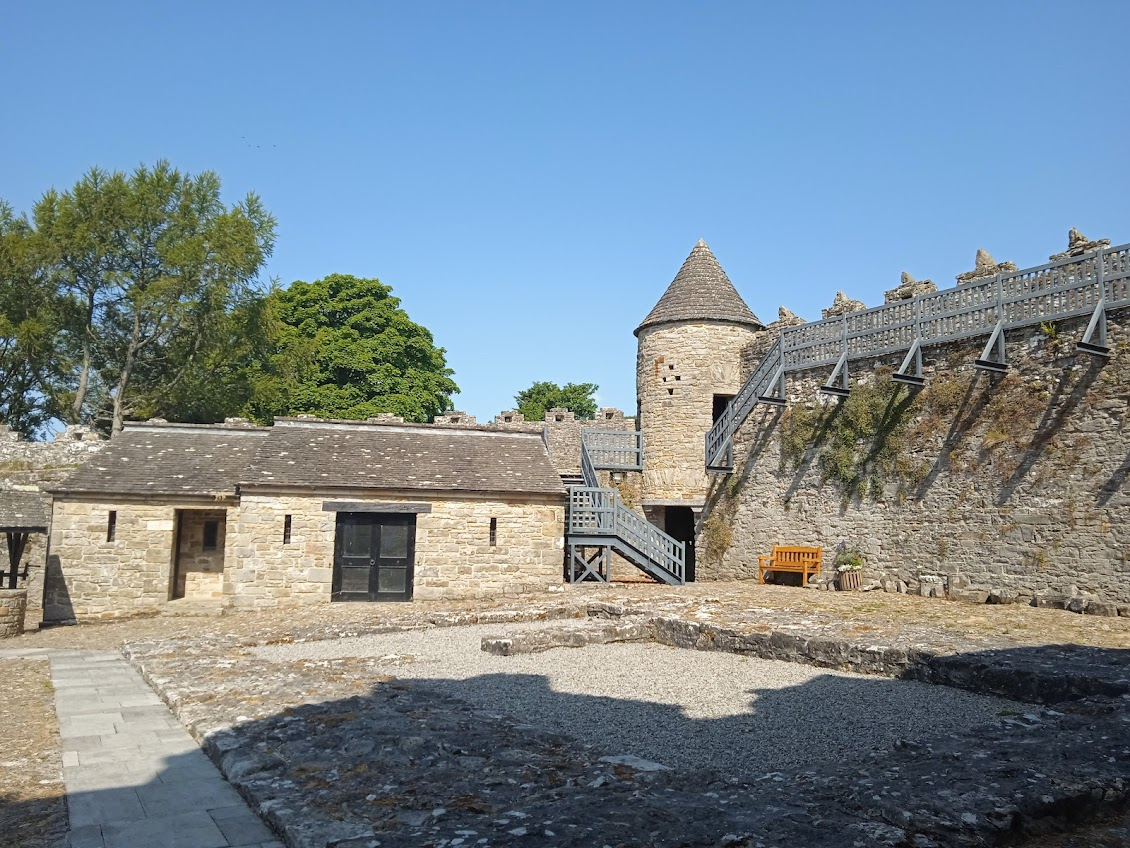
- Parke's castle courtyard, showing the foundations of O'Rourke's castle in the foreground.
- Former names: Baile Nua, Newtowne

General information
- Architectural style: Plantation Castle, Manor House
- Location: Leitrim, Ireland
- Address: Kilmore, Leitrim, Ireland
- Country: Ireland
- Owner: Office of Public Works

Parke's Castle is a 17th-century Manor house. It was originally known as Newtowne and is situated on the shore of Lough Gill, County Leitrim, Ireland.

Parke's Castle was built on the site of an earlier 16th century O'Rourke (Uí Ruairc) tower house. The Gaelic tower house and bawn had been confiscated by The English Crown, following the execution of its last owner, Brian O'Rourke. Subsequently, the site was leased and renovated by Captain Robert Parke in the 1630s. Parke had been granted some of the former O'Rourke lands as part of the Plantations.

== History ==
=== O'Rourke's Tower House ===
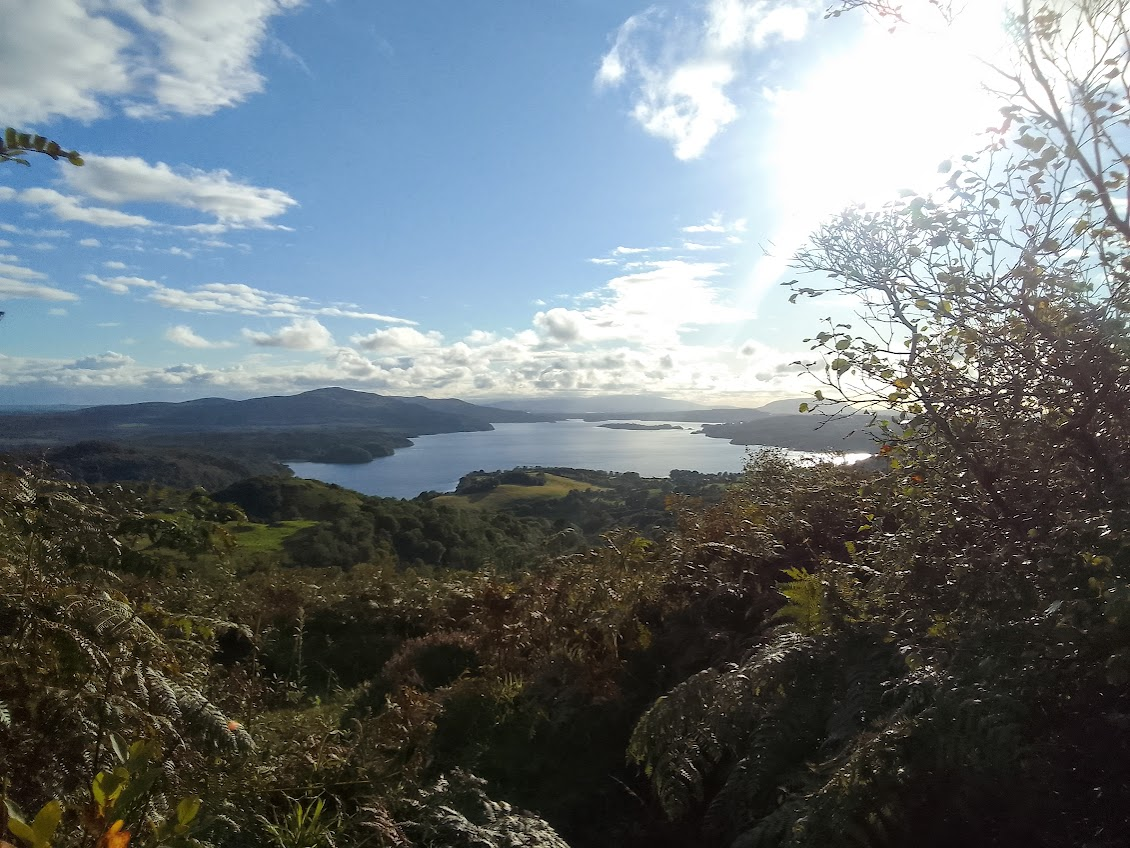
View of Lough Gill from the summit of O'Rourke's Table.

The first mention of O'Rourke's tower house at Baile Nua (Newtowne) appears in the Annals of Lough Cé in 1546. According to the annals, "great treachery was practiced by the sons of Alexander MacCabe against O'Ruairc in his own town i.e. Baile Nua, his castle in the Barony of Drumahaire". Therefore, it is reasonable to suggest that this tower house dates to the mid-16th century.

There are several other monuments in the surrounding area connected to the O'Rourke family. Castle Duroy (Irish: Dubhsraith) is located less than one kilometre to the east, along the lakeshore. Originally a tower house, just one wall now survives. In Dromahair village, the O'Rourke hall house is likely 13th century in date and was built beside the river Bonet. It still survives as an ivy-covered rectangular structure. Creevelea friary is located just outside Dromahair village and was founded by the O'Rourke family in 1508. The friary is in ruins, but is open to the public. Lastly, a small mountain known as O'Rourke's Table overlooks Lough Gill. According to local tradition, it was the meeting place of the O'Rourke family in medieval times. It is open to the public and the mountain trail has recently been renovated.

Brian O'Rourke became Chieftain of his family and Lord of West Breifne in 1566. He ascended the chieftaincy following succession disputes with his brothers, after the death of his father, Brian Ballagh O'Rourke. He ruled during a time of English colonial expansion in Ireland, known as the Tudor or Elizabethan conquest of Ireland. In the mid-16th century, the English were gaining significant footholds in Ireland and expanding their sphere of influence in the northwest region. This was helped by the success of Henry VIII's program of surrender and regrant.

Brian O'Rourke frequently had territorial disputes with the English, punctuated by occasional cessations in hostilities. His castle at Leitrim was seized by the English in 1578, however, it appears that he came to an agreement with them, as he was knighted in October that same year. However, by 1580, Brian was in open revolt against the Elizabethan regime again. He dismantled his castle at Leitrim, to prevent the English from occupying it. The following year, Brian broke down his castles at Newtowne and Dromahair to prevent them from falling into English hands.

O'Rourke's relationship with the Elizabethan regime deteriorated after he sheltered around eighty survivors of the Spanish Armada fleet. The Spanish sailors had been shipwrecked at Streedagh beach in Sligo, in September 1588. The Anglo-Spanish War (1585–1604) was then underway and the Spanish Armada landing in Ireland was perceived as a threat to England's security. Brian helping survivors of the Armada, therefore, was seen as treason by the English. The English Governor of Connacht, Richard Bingham, decided to attack O'Rourke in his castle at Newtowne. However, Brian managed to escape, travelling first to Doe Castle in County Donegal, where he remained for a year. He then travelled to the Kingdom of Scotland, where he attempted to raise an army of gallowglass soldiers to help him reclaim his kingdom. Brian O'Rourke was immediately arrested on the orders of King James VI, under pressure from his relative, Elizabeth I. O'Rourke was extradited to London, in what became the first case of extradition in Ireland and Britain. He was imprisoned in the Tower of London for several months, which culminated in his trial. Brian was denied a lawyer during his trial, as well as the opportunity to examine the charges against him. He was found guilty of high treason. On the 3rd of November 1591, Brian O'Rourke was brought to Tyburn, where he was hanged, drawn and quartered.

Brian's son, Brian Óg O'Rourke, eventually inherited his father's title. He had a succession dispute with his brother Tadhg, who had sided with the English in order to garner military support for his succession claim. Brian Óg continued his father's struggle against the English and was involved in the Nine Years' War. Brian Óg's castle at Leitrim village was the destination for O'Sullivan Beare and his retinue, who marched from the Beara Peninsula following the Battle of Kinsale. O'Sullivan arrived with only thirty followers; nearly 1,000 of his kingdom's men, women and children had perished on the long journey north. However, little is known of any activities at Newtowne Castle during this period.

=== Robert Parke's Castle ===
The Plantation of Leitrim began in 1620, with 48 so-called 'undertakers' tasked with overseeing the establishment of new towns for English and Scottish settlers. These Plantation settlements were created on land which formerly belonged to Gaelic Irish nobility and had since been confiscated by The English Crown. Large land grants were frequently made to favourite courtiers of James VI and I. The land at Newtowne was initially granted to Sir William Irving, a member of the Privy Council, who passed the property over to Sir John Spottiswood. Roger Jones, a well-connected businessman, brought his young nephews Robert and William Parke with him to Sligo in 1606.

It is unclear when exactly Robert Parke acquired the site of O'Rourke's castle at Newtowne. However, in 1628, he was granted a licence to hold a weekly market at Newtowne, as well as two fairs per year. By this stage, Robert Parke also had 1,000 acres of land mortgaged from Con O'Rourke. Around the same time, Robert's brother William Parke took possession of the O'Rourke castle at Dromahair.

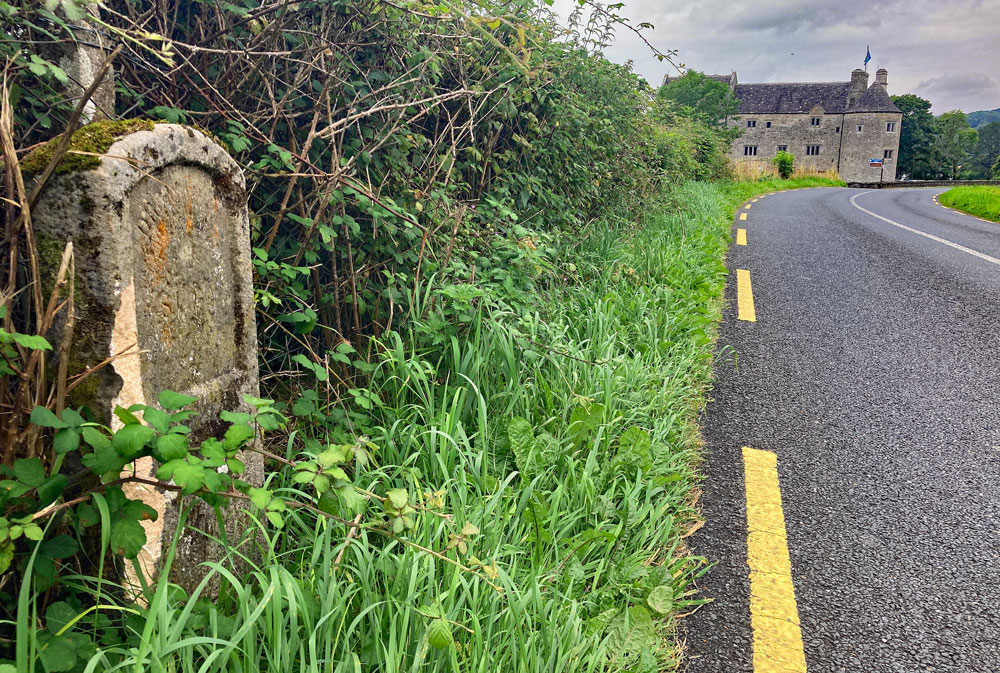
The milestone on the road by Parke's Castle, indicating 7 miles to Sligo and 5 miles to Dromahair.

The remains of O'Rourke's tower house at Newtowne were demolished shortly after the English began to occupy the site. The gatehouse was constructed first, then two defensive towers in the northwest and northeast corners. The towers and gatehouse predate the manor house, which was built last and likely completed in the mid-1630s. A pair of smaller sentry towers and a sally port (water gate) were added to the southern wall. The bawn walls were reinforced, and crenellations and shot holes were added. The interior of the courtyard was paved over with cobblestone, which removed any traces of the earlier Gaelic castle.

Parke appears to have prospered at Newtowne. He benefitted hugely from the Cromwellian Conquest of Ireland and was granted thousands of acres in Sligo and Leitrim, following the Act of Settlement. Parke also participated in civic life and was High Sheriff of Leitrim on two occasions.

Parke employed Irish as well as English workers on his lands. He even employed a Gaelic harper called Dermond O'Farry.

=== 1641 Rebellion and Confederate Wars ===
Robert Parke was appointed Justice of the Peace and became an MP for Roscommon in 1641. He served as High Sheriff of Leitrim in 1656 and 1668. Although he participated in the plantations and the British colonial administration, Parke attempted to remain neutral during the 1641 Rebellion. It has been pointed out that many English settlers tried to avoid getting drawn into the conflict, so Parke was likely not an outlier in this regard.

Sir Fredrick Hamilton, a fellow planter who resided nearby in Manorhamilton, was outraged by Parke's behaviour during this period. Hamilton was besieged on a number of occasions in his own castle and was keen to exact revenge on the Irish rebels. Observing that Parke seemed to be under no threat and was possibly colluding with the Irish, Hamilton burned the village of Newtowne in the spring of 1642.

"A week or so after Easter, Sir Fredrick, with a party of horse and foot, burned some villages and killed a number of rebels two miles from Sligo town. He returned home via Newtown Castle and village, which he noticed had not been attacked at all by the insurgents. He was then informed that the rebels' cows had been allowed to graze right up to the bawn walls of the castle, without any interference by Robert Parke and his sixty-strong garrison, even while Manorhamilton was blockaded. Moreover, the Irish apparently passed freely by Parke's castle, with provisions from Sligo town, on their way to their camp at Cornastauk. So Hamilton decided there and then to burn Newtown village, which 'so long had relieved and sheltered the rogues', and to put some of the inhabitants to the sword. As for Parke himself, he would be made to answer for his collusion with the rebels on another occasion."

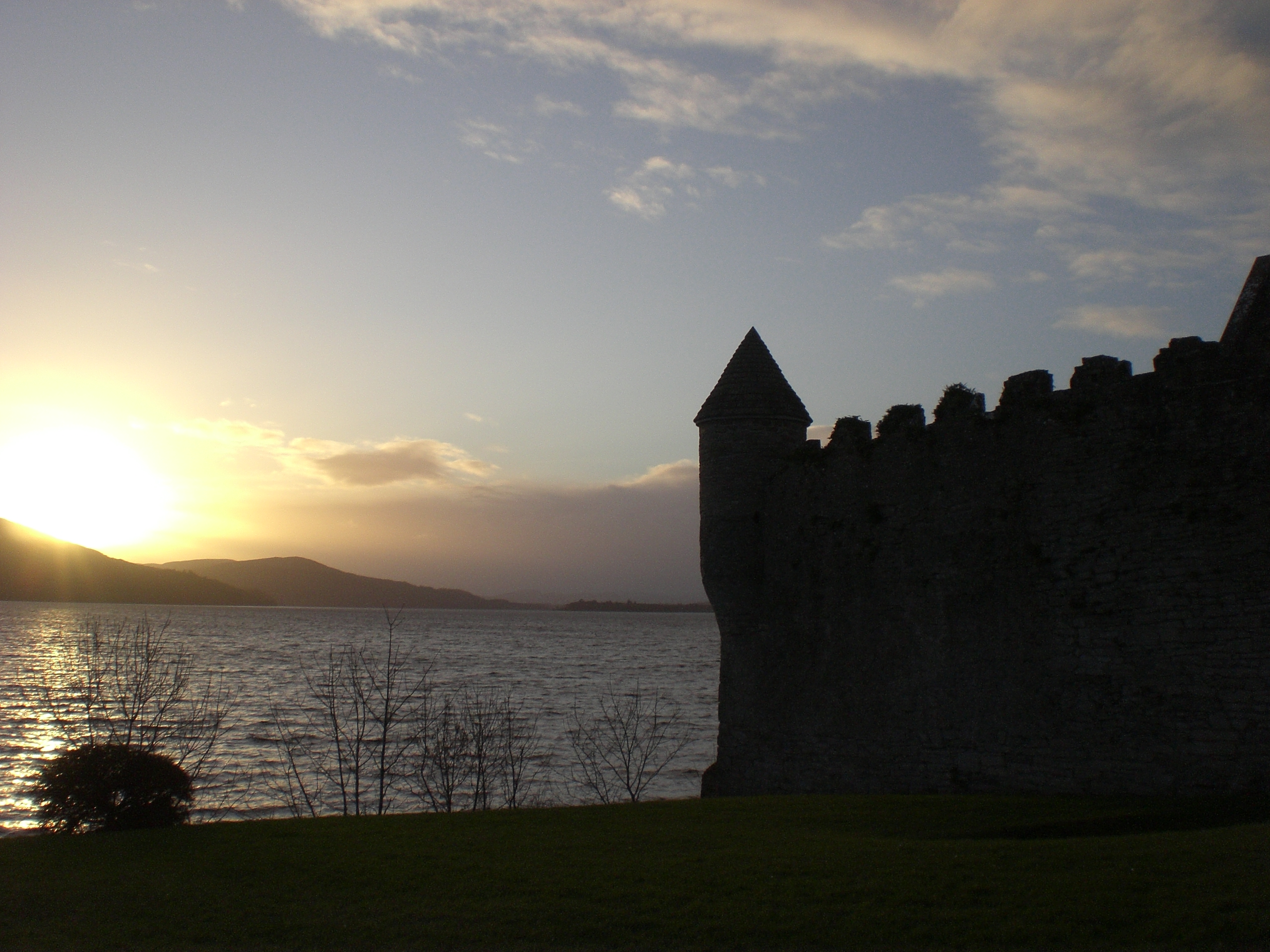
Sunset over Lough Gill with Parke’s Castle in Foreground

Parke was also arrested and imprisoned by Frederick Hamilton in July 1642 for perceived disloyalty. On the same night of the arrest, Hamilton took Parke and some of his soldiers to attack Sligo town. Hamilton later boasted that 300 people in the town were 'put to the sword and the town burned'. They also burned Sligo Abbey during the raid. It has been argued that Frederick Hamilton attacked Sligo town in response to the Sligo Gaol massacre, in which a large number of Protestant settlers were killed, despite being given an assurance of safe passage by the insurgents.

After the attack on Sligo, Parke was taken to Manorhamilton Castle and kept prisoner by Frederick Hamilton for almost two years, despite a number of orders to release him. Parke was given an official pardon by his father-in-law, Sir Edward Povey, who petitioned for his release. Parke was eventually released while Hamilton was away in Derry.

In 1649, Newtowne Castle was held by Parliamentarians, who then surrendered to Royalist forces on the 10th of July that same year. It is unclear if Robert Parke was resident in the castle at that particular time, however. In May 1652, the Royalists were forced to surrender the castle to the Parliamentarians, who were under the command of Sir Charles Coote. Following this period of unrest, it appears that Robert Parke was resident again in his castle at Newtowne and resumed his political career.

=== Later History ===
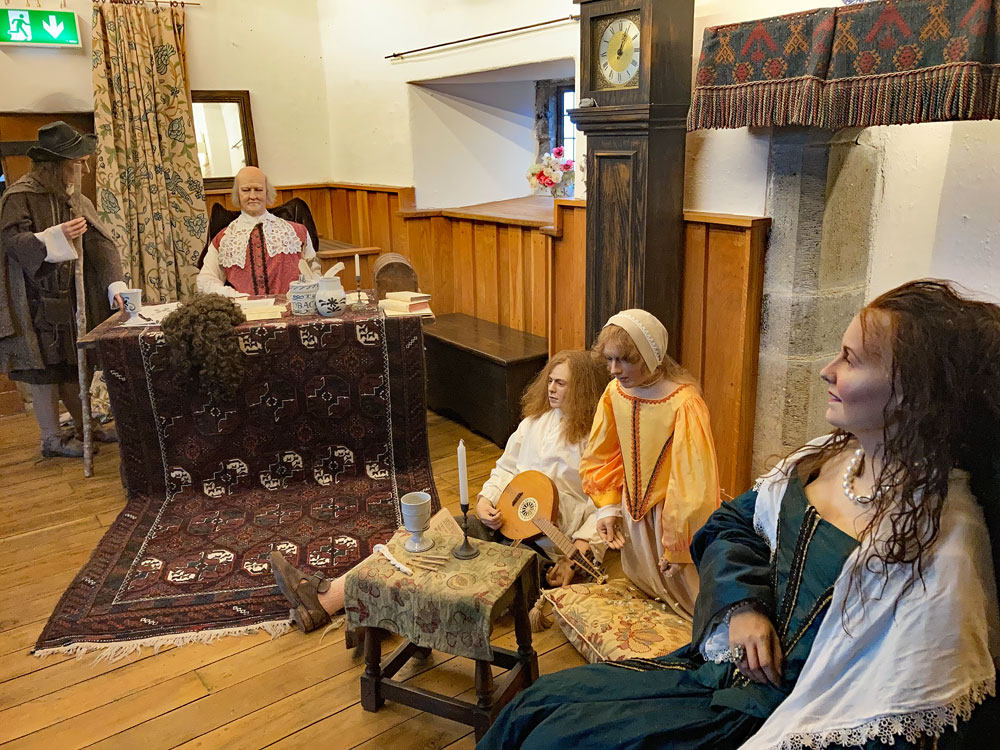
The first floor of the Gatehouse in Parke's Castle, showing interpretive models of the Parke family in period dress.

Robert Parke married Ann Povey. Her family originally came from England and settled in Roscommon, as they also participated in the Plantations. The couple had three children named Ann, Robert and Mary.

Robert Parke died in the Autumn of 1671. The two younger children, Robert and Mary, are not mentioned in his will, which suggests that they predeceased him. Local folklore says that they drowned in the nearby lake, however, there is no evidence for this story. There is no further mention of Ann Povey in the historical record, so it is unclear how she spent the remainder of her life. Robert and Ann's eldest daughter, also called Ann, was the couple's only surviving child. She later married Sir Francis Gore from Lissadell House.

The castle passed to the Gore family after Robert's death, but it was abandoned soon afterwards and fell into ruin. The castle was briefly garrisoned by Protestants in 1688, during the Williamite Wars. Sir Thomas Cocking did an illustration of the castle in 1791, showing it in a ruinous state. The Manor house was uninhabited for almost two centuries, while the bawn was used as a farmyard and stables by local people until the early 20th century.

The site was eventually purchased by the Irish Free State in 1935 and has remained in State care ever since.

== Excavation and Restoration ==
In the early 1970s, the archaeological excavations of the site commenced. The excavations were funded by Queen's University Belfast and were conducted over four seasons. The foundations of the O'Rourke (Uí Ruairc) tower house were discovered under the cobblestones in the courtyard. The bases of several other structures were discovered within the courtyard, including a well, a possible metalworking area and a mortar pit. Over a thousand objects from the 16th, 17th, 18th and 19th centuries were recovered during the excavations. A considerable volume of faunal remains were recovered, too. The fact that the excavation yielded objects from the 18th and 19th century indicates reuse of the site.

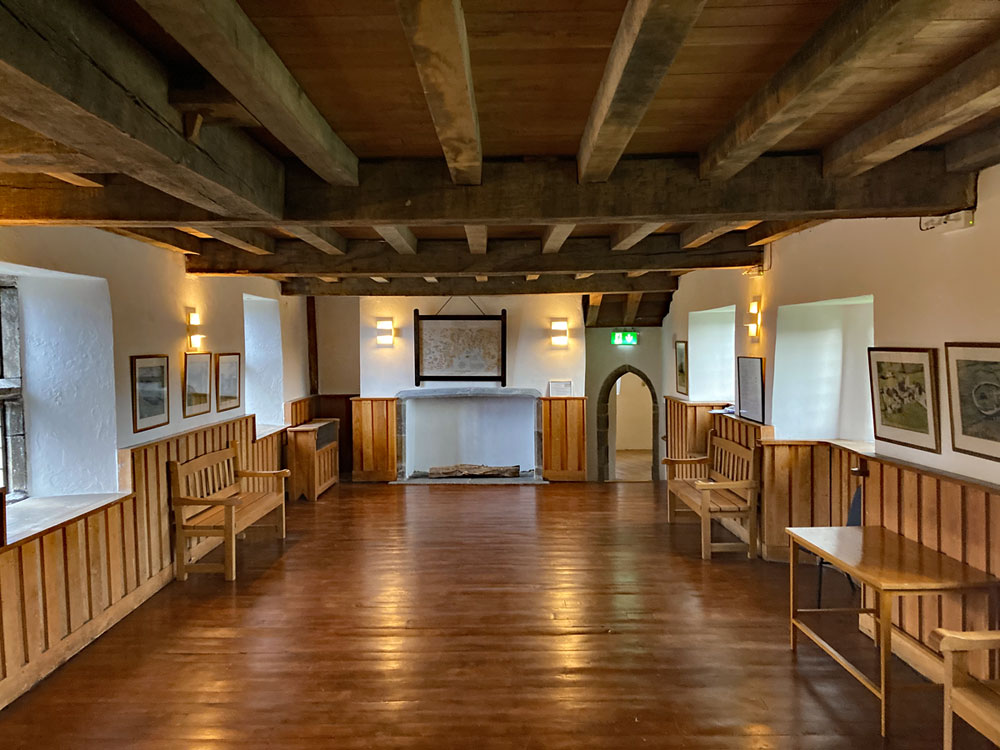
The refurbished Banquet Hall in Parke's Castle. The floors and ceilings were restored with native Irish oak using 17th century carpentry techniques.

Following the archaeological excavations, the castle was restored using traditional woodworking techniques by the Office of Public Works. Wainscoting was added to the upper floors of the Gatehouse and the Manor house. Internal roofing was completed using oak wood, using the mortise and tenon technique.

Staff kitchens were built to the south of the courtyard, adjoining the Gatehouse. A reconstruction of a smithy/forge was built along the southern wall, along with modern bathroom facilities. The 19th century stables were rebuilt along the western wall. Outside the bawn wall, several excavated sections of the moat were fenced off. The sweathouse at the end of the lawn was reconstructed and incorporated into the official visitor site, which is now designated as a National Monument.

Following the restoration program, the site opened to the public on a seasonal basis in 1990.

== Location and Access ==
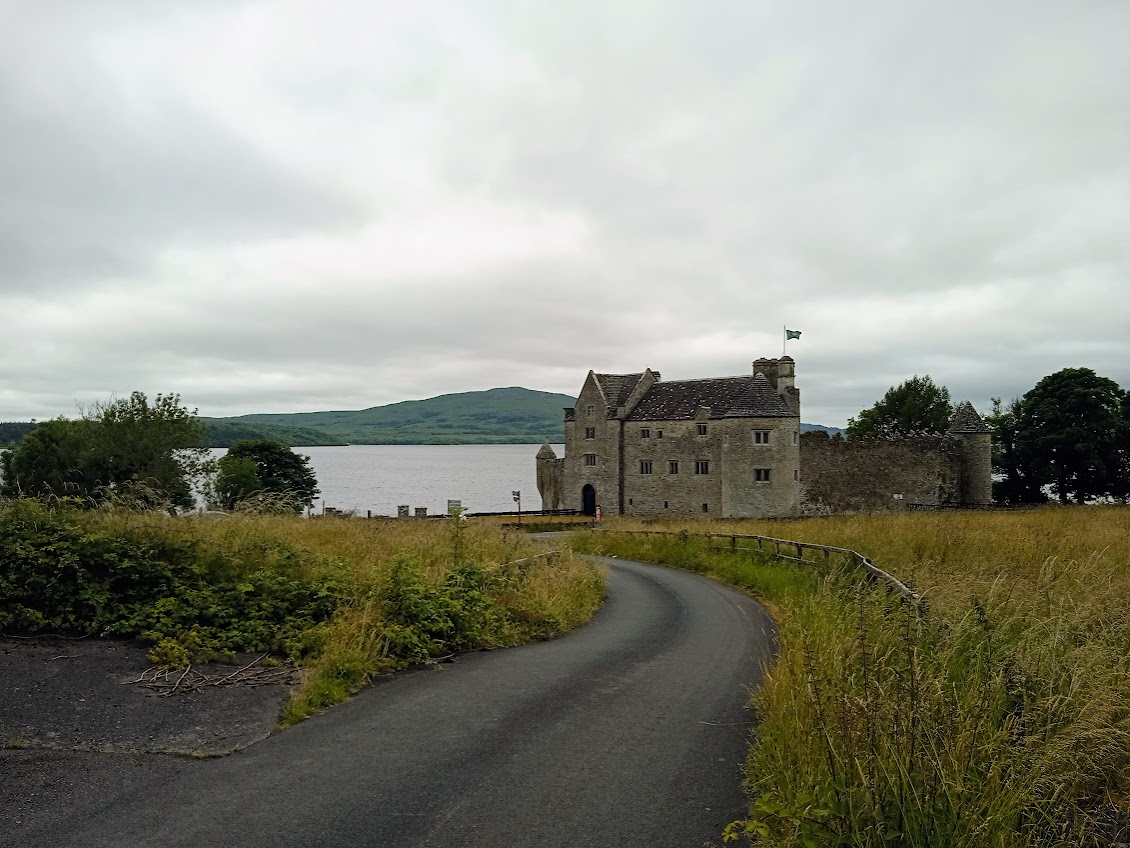
View of Parke's Castle from the north.

The restored castle is now managed by the Office of Public Works and is open to the public from March to November. There is a small admission fee to visit the site. Guided tours are available, as well as a 'self guide' option.

A regular 'Local Link' bus service, operated by Transport for Ireland, runs from Sligo to Dromahair (route 563) and stops at the castle.
