= R287 road (Ireland) =

Road in Ireland

R287 road
- Bóthar R287
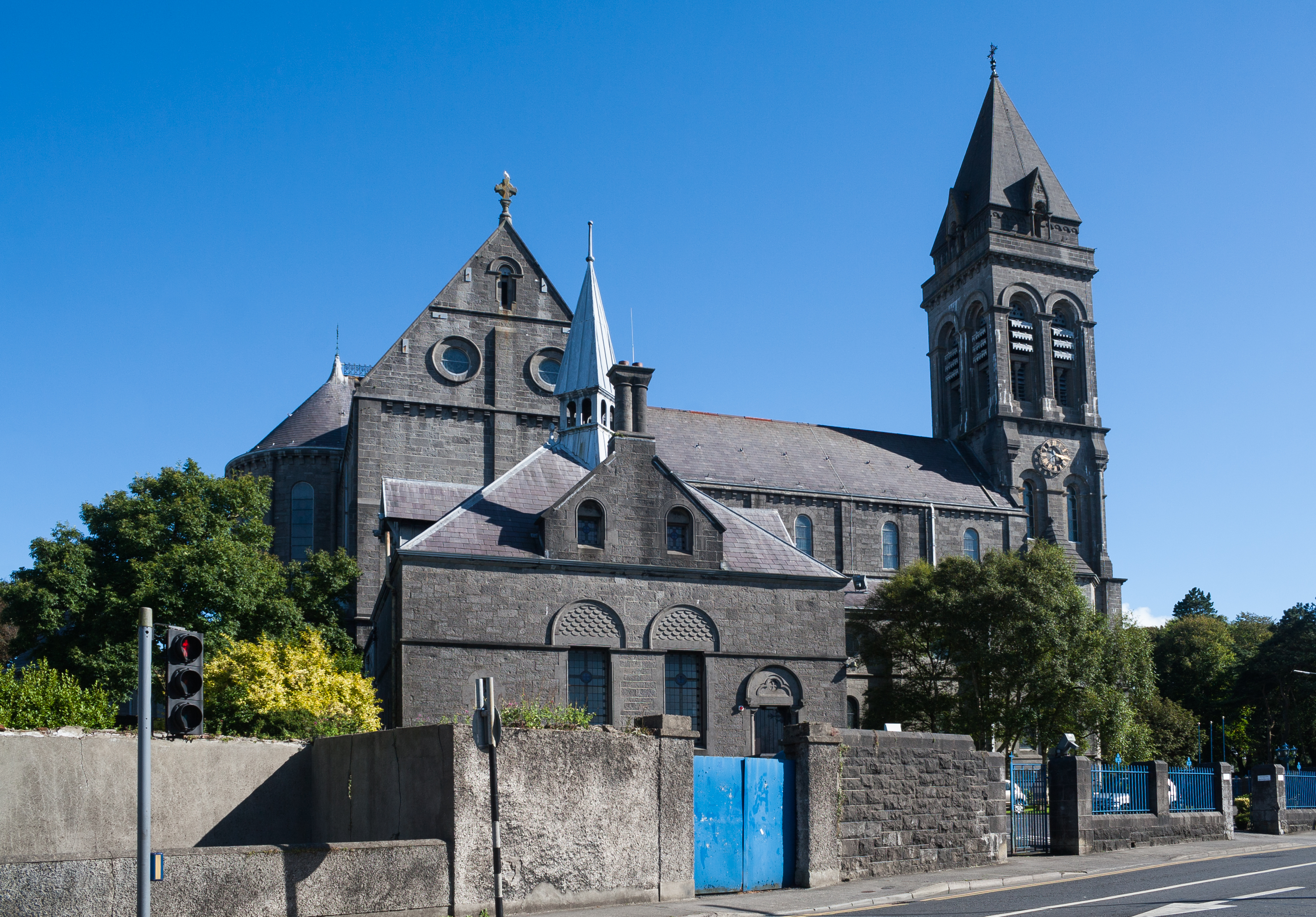
- Sligo Cathedral with R287 in foreground

Route information
- Length: 25.9 km (16.1 mi)

Major junctions
- From: N4 at Queen's Store Road, Sligo
- R292 at Wine Street, Sligo; R870 at Pearse Road, Sligo; R284 at Tullynagracken South, Carraroe, Sligo; R290 at Gortlownan, County Sligo; Enter County Leitrim; R288 at Dromahair; R289 and Drumlease Road at Cleen, County Leitrim
- To: R280 at Lisgorman

Location
- Country: Ireland

Highway system
- Roads in Ireland; Motorways; Primary; Secondary; Regional

The R287 road is a regional road in Ireland linking Sligo and the R280 in County Leitrim.

From Sligo, the road goes south via Carraroe before turning east towards Lough Gill. The road follows the lake's southern shore past Dooney Rock and later enters County Leitrim. In Leitrim, the road passes near Dromahair before heading northeast to end at the R280. The R287 is 25.9 km (16.1 mi) long.

== See also ==
- Roads in Ireland
