= R277 road (Ireland) =

Regional road in Ireland

R277 road
- Bóthar R277
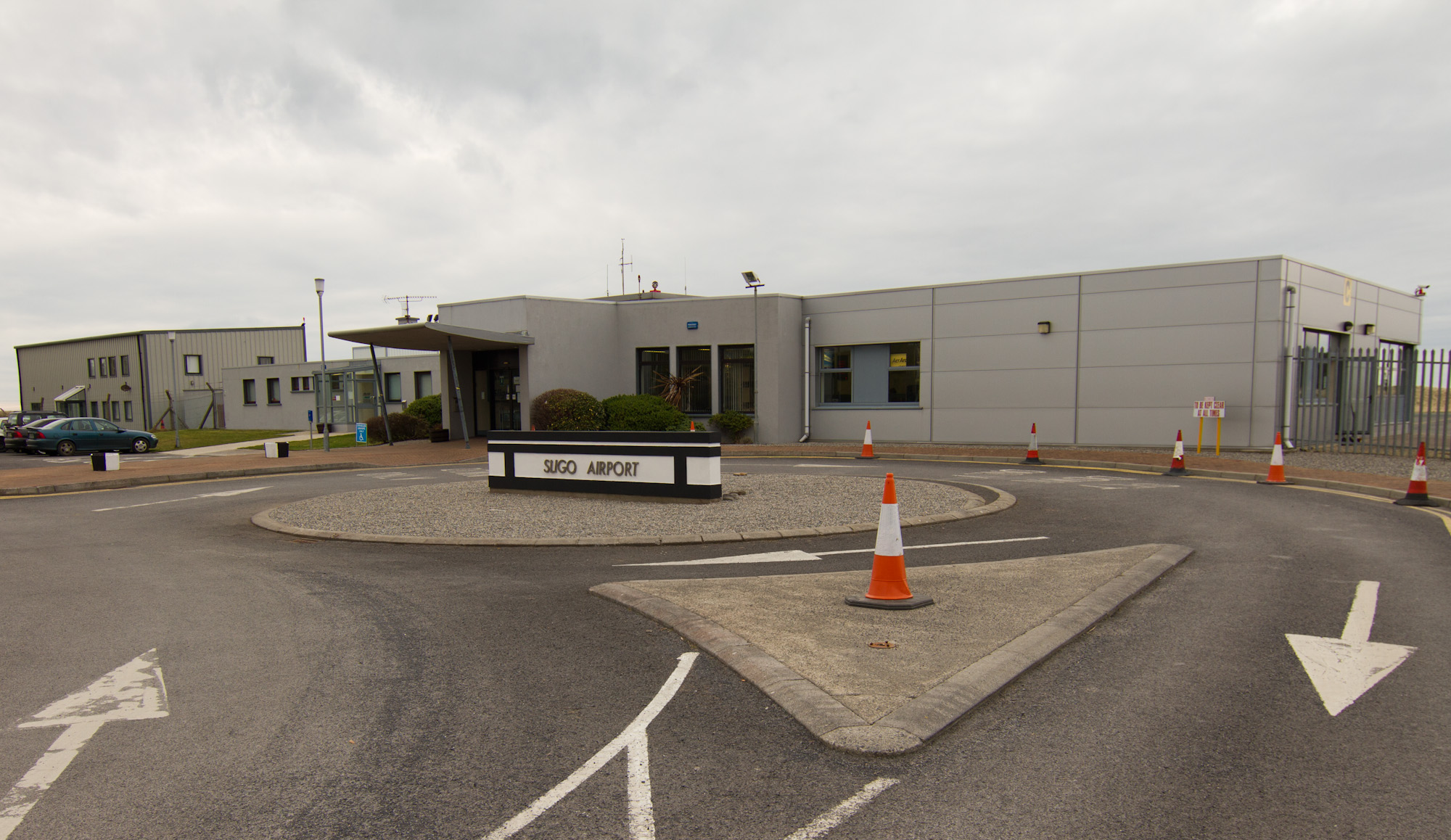
- Sligo Airport at the end of R277

Route information
- Length: 1.7 km (1.1 mi)

Major junctions
- From: R292
- To: Sligo Airport

Location
- Country: Ireland

Highway system
- Roads in Ireland; Motorways; Primary; Secondary; Regional

The R277 road is a regional road in Ireland linking the R292 road from just outside Strandhill to Sligo Airport (Strandhill) in County Sligo. The airport access section of the road, Airport Road, is the site of the Sligo Airport Business Park, a technology and enterprise centre hosting 17 companies.

== See also ==
- Roads in Ireland
