= Euroceltic Airways =

Irish short haul airline

IATA	ICAO	Call sign
5Q	ECY	Wexford
- Founded: 1999
- Commenced operations: 14 February 2001
- Ceased operations: 21 January 2003
- Operating bases: Waterford Airport, Ireland
- Fleet size: See Fleet below
- Destinations: See Services below
- Key people: Diran Kazandjian (Founder); Noel Hanley

Euroceltic Airways was a short haul airline, founded in 1999 by Diran Kazandjian and taken over by businessman Noel Hanley, the CEO of Global Ocean Technologies Ltd in 2002. It was given its Air Operator's Certificate on 12 February 2001. The airline ceased operations on 21 January 2003.

== Former code data ==
- IATA Code: 5Q
- Callsign: Wexford

== History ==
During the period 2001 - 2002, the Euroceltic management team made many ambitious plans for expansion. These plans included either merging with or taking over Danish airline NewAir, creating new routes from Waterford Airport to other parts of Europe, and even a multimillion-pound investment at Waterford Airport.

However, Euroceltic struggled to find a niche in the European airline market. The downturn in the airline market as a result of the 9/11 terrorist attacks in the United States only made things worse.

== Services ==
On 14 February 2001 Euroceltic began operating its first flights, from Waterford Airport in Ireland, to Liverpool Airport and London Luton in England. Euroceltic also added routes to Dublin, Sligo, and Donegal in Ireland. Soon after the inaugural flight, the head office was moved to Waterford Airport.

(The Euroceltic flight to London replaced the previous operators, Ryanair, who first operated a route from Waterford Airport to London Gatwick as their inaugural flight, in 1985. They dropped this route when their fleet was upgraded to jet aircraft, which were too big for the Waterford Airport runway. The Waterford - Luton route has since been taken over by Aer Arann, then Flybe, then VLM Airlines, then dropped)

== Fleet ==
The Euroceltic fleet consisted of two Fokker F-27 aircraft (G-ECAT and G-ECAH), in an all-economy class configuration seating 48 passengers.

== Incident ==
On 2 November 2002, a Euroceltic Fokker F-27 (registered G-ECAT) was coming into land on Runway 11 at Sligo, after a routine flight from Dublin, when it overran the runway. After landing nosewheel first almost halfway down the runway, the aircraft eventually came to rest with the nose of the aircraft in the sea, and the main landing gear on an embankment. Passengers were evacuated and there were no reported casualties. However the plane was declared a write-off by the company two weeks later, due to the saltwater damage to the cockpit. The cause of the accident was a "fast, low approach, leading to the aircraft landing late, beyond the normal touch down point, thereby making it impossible to stop the aircraft on the remaining runway available". The pilot at the time had been placed under restrictions following a CAA audit of Euroceltic, as noted in paragraph 1.18.2 of the AAIU report. The chief pilot of Euroceltic "was using an instructor tone and coaching" the pilot during landing, as noted in paragraph 2.1 of the report. The AAIU report also notes in paragraph 2.1 that "Whilst the meteorological conditions were difficult they were well within the limits for the type of approach and there was very little crosswind component" and in paragraph 2.2 that "there was no significant standing water on the runway during the landing".

The aircraft was carrying the Irish rock band Aslan.

== Bankruptcy ==
The accident was the final nail in the coffin for Euroceltic Airways, and the airline eventually returned losses of €1.1 million. Euroceltic had its Air Operator's Certificate revoked by the Civil Aviation Authority and consequently ceased all operations on 21 January 2003, with the loss of 120 jobs. Many of its routes were subsequently taken over by Aer Arann, and its remaining aircraft (Fokker F-27 registered G-ECAH) was returned to its lessor in Scandinavia.

== See also ==
- Sligo Airport
- Aer Arann
- Fokker F27 Friendship
- Lists of defunct airlines
