= Sligo Airport =

Regional airport in County Sligo, Ireland

Sligo Airport Aerfort Shligigh
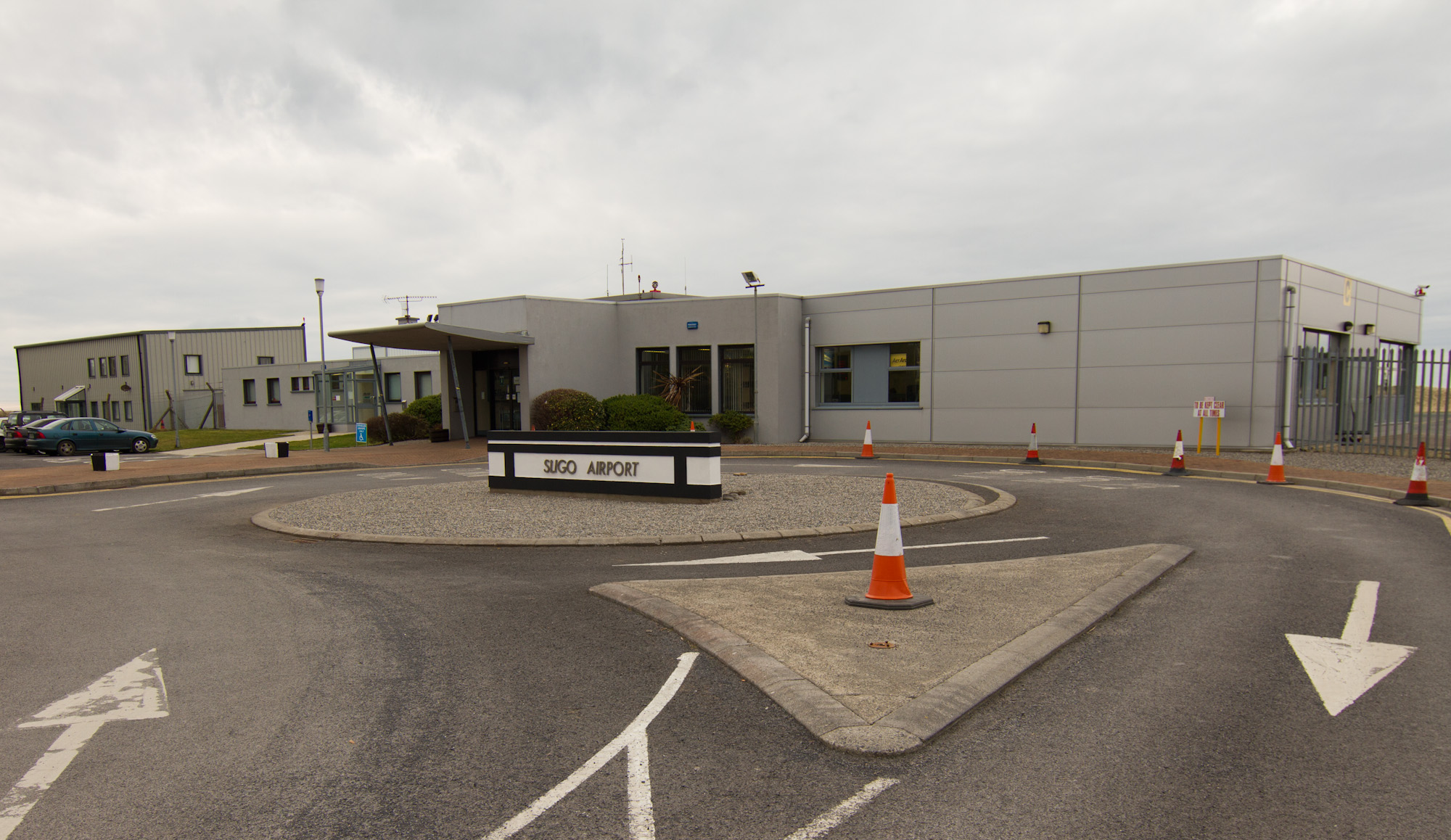
- Sligo Airport
- IATA: SXL; ICAO: EISG

Summary
- Airport type: Public
- Operator: Sligo Northwest Airport Co Ltd
- Serves: Sligo, Ireland
- Location: Strandhill, County Sligo
- Elevation AMSL: 3 m (9.8 ft)
- Coordinates: 54°16′49″N 008°35′57″W
- Website: www.sligoairport.com

Maps
- Location of airport in Ireland
- Interactive map of Sligo Airport

Runways
Direction	Length		Surface
Direction	m	ft	Surface
10/28	1,199	3,933	Asphalt
- Source: AirNav Ireland

Sligo Airport (Irish: Aerfort Shligigh) (IATA: SXL, ICAO: EISG) is located in Strandhill, County Sligo, 5 NM (9.3 km; 5.8 mi) west of Sligo, at the end of the R277 road, in Ireland. The airport is a small regional airport and has had no scheduled routes since 2011. It is the home of the Sligo Aero Club (a Registered Training Facility) and the northwest base for the Irish Coastguard. Private flight training, skydiving and charity jumps are all operated from the airport. In 2002 a Euroceltic Airways Fokker F27 aircraft carrying the band Aslan overshot the runway and the nose dipped into the sea. The accident caused no casualties.

== History ==
The site was first used as an airport in 1974, when a grass airstrip was developed for private flying and training by the Sligo Aero Club. Development to turn the airstrip into a regional airport began in 1981, with the aim of introducing a direct air link between Sligo and Dublin. The tarmac runway was constructed in 1981, and the terminal building was completed in 1983. The first commercial service, Sligo to Dublin, began on 4 July 1983, operated by Avair.

As of 2002, Euroceltic Airways was operating the government public service obligation subsidy scheme for the route to Dublin. The airline collapsed shortly afterwards in early 2003, due to losing its only aircraft when it overshot the runway at Sligo the previous November. Aer Arann operated the route for the remainder of the contract. The 2005 contract tender was offered to Loganair who declined it. Aer Arann subsequently negotiated the operation of the contract with the Government.

On 21 February 2007 the Irish Government announced that it would be giving €8.5 million to the airport in capital grant money, to upgrade the runway and add approach lighting and safety enhancements. However, the proposed runway extension would have required infill and the erection of gantries across part of the adjacent protected beach. The plan drew much local criticism and almost 400 objections from residents of the local area, fisheries groups, the Department of Environment, An Taisce and Birdwatch Ireland. The planning permission was quashed on the third attempt by a high court judge on justification grounds.

Until the end of 2008 Aer Arann operated flights to Manchester Airport. The Irish Government-commissioned Value for Money Review of Exchequer Funding on the Regional Airports Programme recommended the ending of operational subvention to the airport and the ending of the PSO designation, citing poor performance, growing operational costs and development of alternative transport connections to the region. In 2011 the airport lost its only scheduled route, operated by Aer Arann, to Dublin Airport twice daily. The final flight was on 21 July 2011.

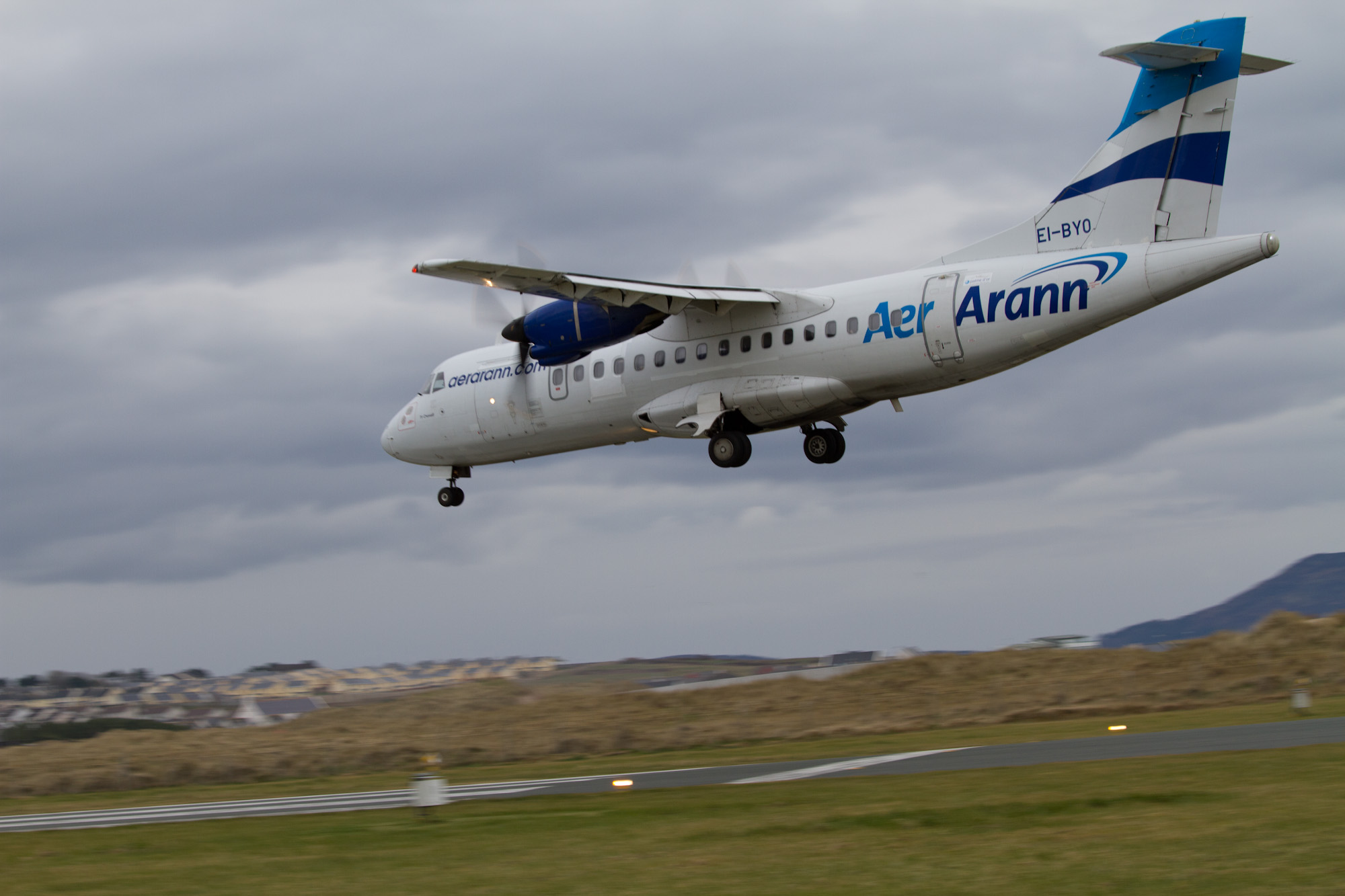
Aer Arann EI-BYO ATR-42-300 landing at Sligo Airport before scheduled services ended.

Passenger Numbers Before Closure
Year	Passenger Numbers
1993–1999 average/period data	~24,000/year
2000	~24,000+
2006	34,310
2007	44,533
2008	42,493
2009	26,706
2010	21,077
2011	7,111

Since the end of passenger flights in 2011, the airport has continued to be a base for the Irish Coast Guard Rescue Helicopter (Rescue 118). General aviation also operates at the airport, including aircraft such as Cessnas, Pipers, and Beechcraft. Sligo Aero Club continues to operate from the airport. The airport receives occasional visits from jets which are suited to land on the shorter runway.

== Services and facilities ==
The runway at Sligo Airport has an asphalt surface and measures 1072m in length and 30m in width.. There are four hangers at the airport, numbered 1 through 4. Hanger 3 is used for aircraft maintenance and Hanger 4 is used for Bristow Helicopters' Coast Guard operations. Hangarage is also available to rent for both long and short term storage. Jet A1, avgas and Oil W100 are available at the airport, and there is an ICAO Category 2 rescue fire fighting service present during operating hours, with Category 3 and 4 available on request. The airport operates between 08:00 and 21:30 local time daily, and the ATC tower is active from the hours of 0800 to 12:30, 13:15 to 18:15 and 19:00 to 21:30.

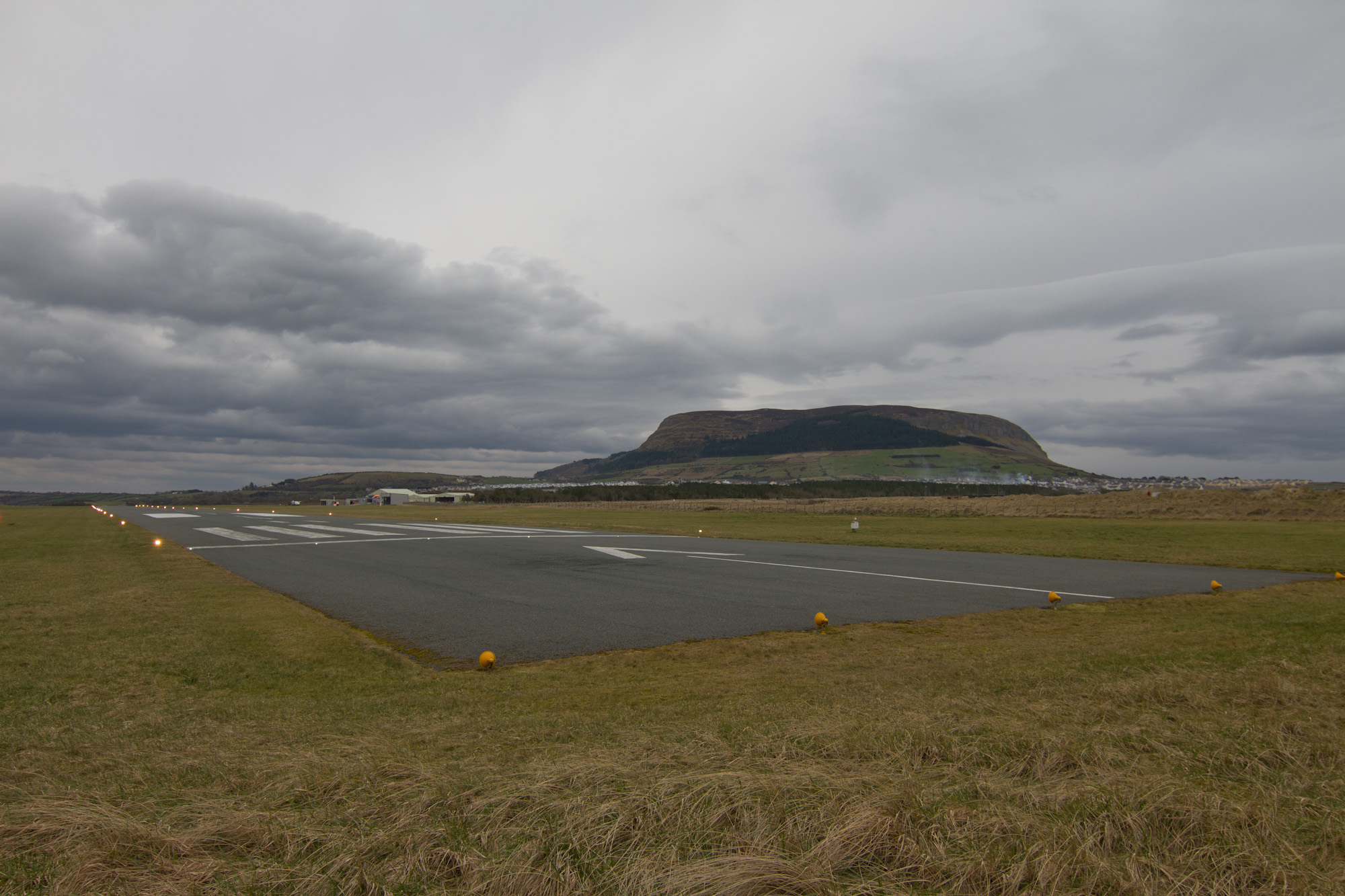
Sligo Airport runway with Knocknarea in the background.

View of the hangers and terminal from across the runway at Sligo airport.

Sligo airport control tower.

== Bristow Ireland Search-and-Rescue base ==
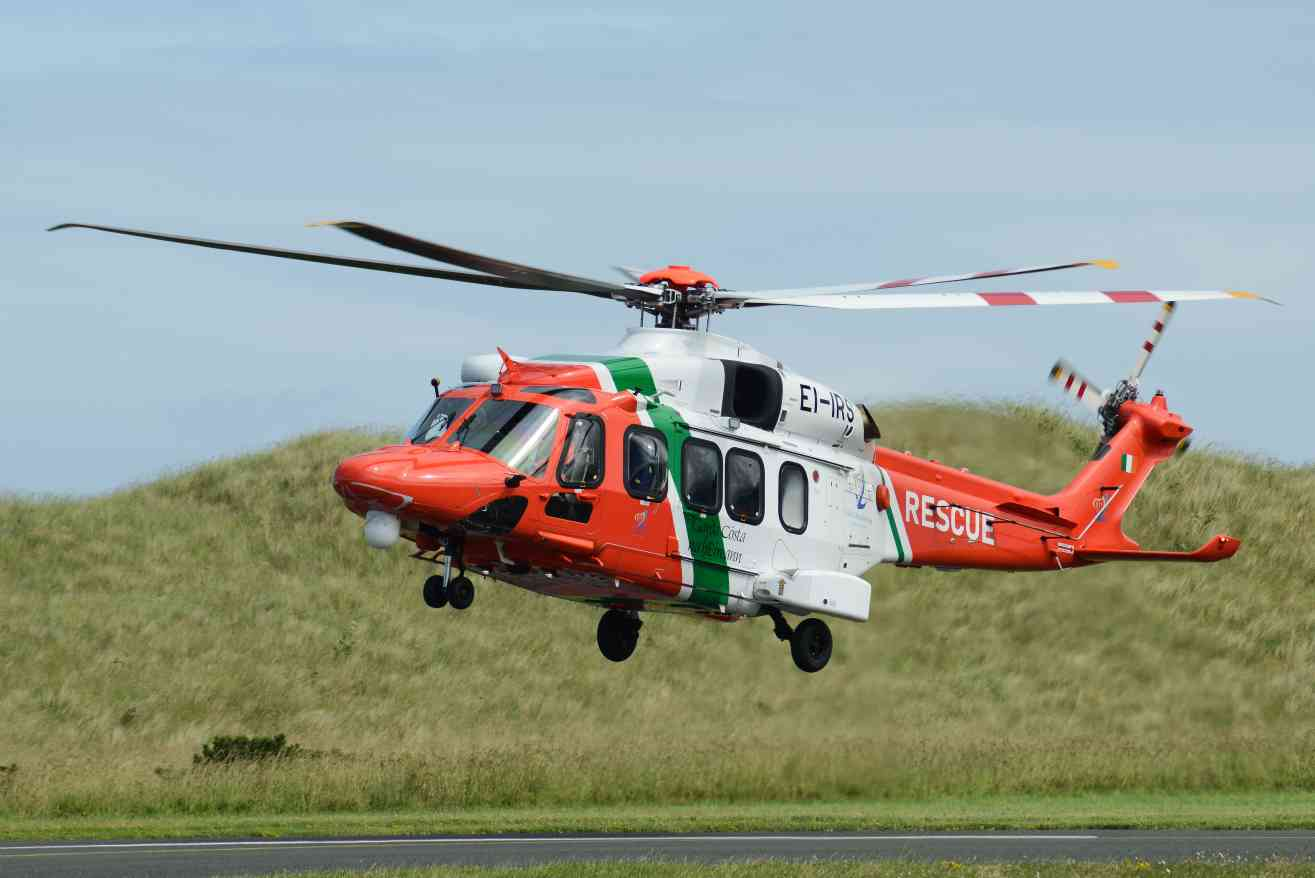
An AgustaWestland AW189 landing into Sligo Airport after a SAR mission

Sligo Airport is the home of Rescue 118, the Irish Coast Guard Helicopter which has served the north-west of Ireland since 2004. The base operates an AgustaWestland AW189 helicopter 24 hours, 365 days a year (which replaced the previously used Sikorsky S92 In December 2025). It deals with many types of incidents, such as cliff rescues, hospital transfers and dealing with sick patients off coastal islands.

Fleet History

- AgustaWestland AW189 (2025-Present)
- Sikorsky S92 (2013-2025)
- Sikorsky S61 (2003-2013)

== NAS Air Ambulance ==
In May 2026, the National Ambulance Service (HSE) introduced a new Helicopter Emergency Medical Service (HEMS) base in the Sligo area, operations started from July 1st, and the service is expected to be fully operational by September 2026. The service operates an Airbus Helicopters EC135, providing rapid emergency medical response to seriously ill or injured patients across the west and north-west of Ireland.

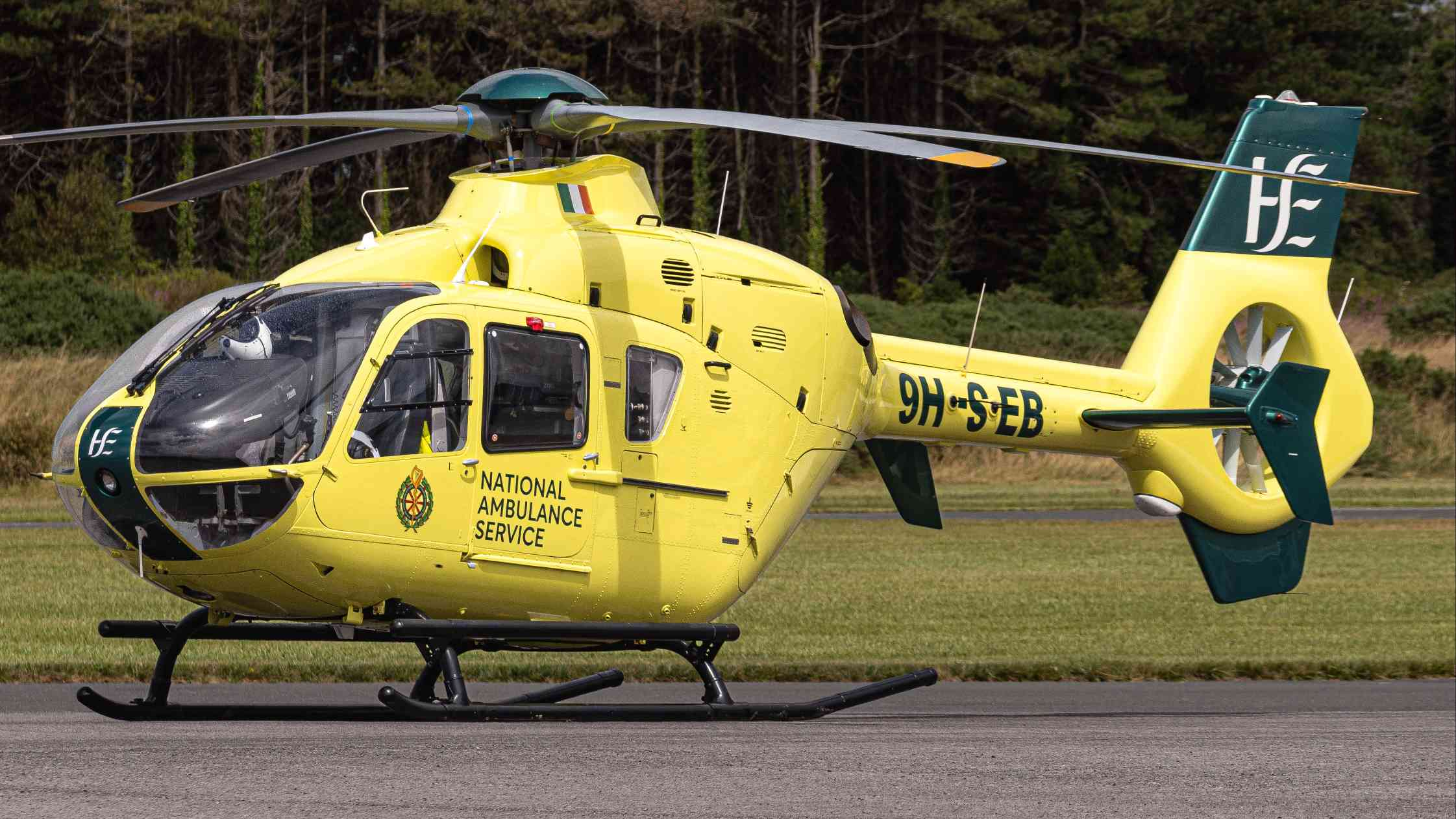
EC135 based at Sligo Airport as of May 2026

The helicopter is operated as part of the HSE's emergency medical services and is intended to complement existing land ambulance resources. Its location allows medical crews to reach areas where road transport may be difficult or time-consuming, particularly in rural and remote parts of the region.

The operation also works alongside other emergency services in the area, including local ambulance crews. The introduction of the service was preceded by joint training exercises in the northwest.

== Accidents and incidents ==
Like airports such as Gibraltar and Funchal, Sligo has a lack of safety margin for undershoots and overshoots because the peninsula upon which the airport is situated is less than 2 km (1.2 mi) long. On 2 November 2002, a Euroceltic Fokker F-27 (registered G-ECAT) was coming in to land, after a routine flight from Dublin, when it overran the runway. After landing nosewheel first almost halfway down the runway, the aircraft eventually came to rest with the nose of the aircraft in the sea, and the main landing gear on an embankment. The passengers, including rock band Aslan, who were travelling on the flight, were all evacuated and there were no reported casualties. However the plane was declared a write-off by the company two weeks later, due to the saltwater damage to the cockpit. The cause of the accident was a "fast, low approach, leading to the aircraft landing late, beyond the normal touch down point, thereby making it impossible to stop the aircraft on the remaining runway available". The pilot at the time had been placed under restrictions following a CAA audit of Euroceltic, as noted in paragraph 1.18.2 of the AAIU report. The chief pilot of Euroceltic "was using an instructor tone and coaching" the pilot during landing, as noted in paragraph 2.1 of the report. The AAIU report also notes in paragraph 2.1 that "Whilst the meteorological conditions were difficult they were well within the limits for the type of approach and there was very little crosswind component" and in paragraph 2.2 that "there was no significant standing water on the runway during the landing".
