= R280 road (Ireland) =

Road in Ireland

R280 road
- Bóthar R280

Route information
- Length: 74 km (46 mi)

Location
- Country: Ireland
- Primary destinations: County Donegal; Bundoran – Starts in Town Centre and passes under the N15; County Leitrim; Kinlough - (R281); Largydonnell; Glenade; Manorhamilton - (R282); (N16); (R287); Killarga; (R289); Drumkeeran – (R200); County Roscommon; Mountallen - (R285); Crosses the River Shannon; County Leitrim; (R208); (R207); Leitrim – (R284); (R209); (R299); Carrick-on-Shannon – terminates at the N4

Highway system
- Roads in Ireland; Motorways; Primary; Secondary; Regional

The R280 road is a regional road in Ireland linking Bundoran in County Donegal in the north to Carrick-on-Shannon in County Leitrim. En route it passes through Kinlough, Manorhamilton, Drumkeeran and Leitrim village. The road is 74 km (46 mi) long.

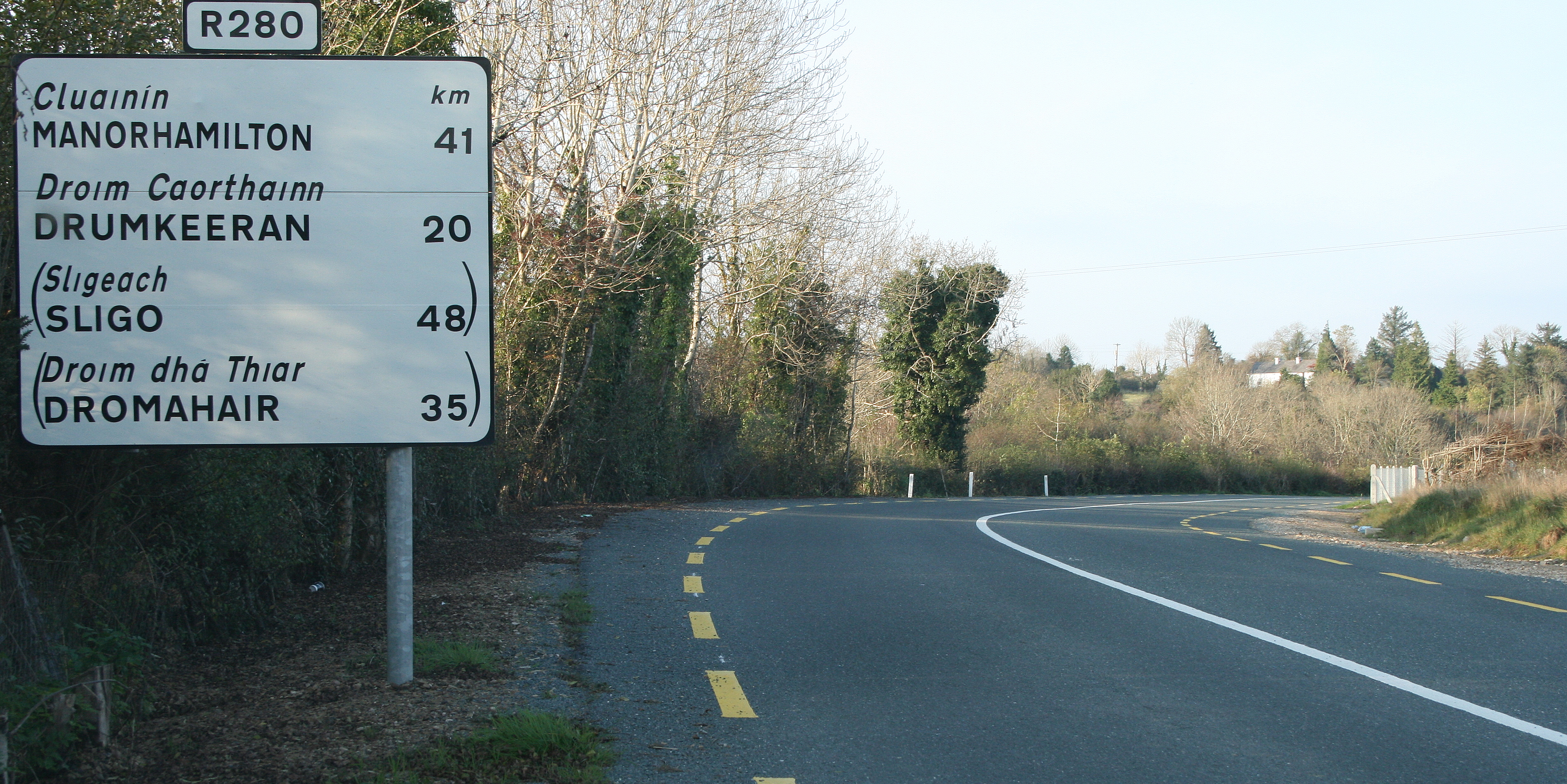
The R280 near Leitrim village Clickable image: click a sign to go to its destination article

== See also ==
- Roads in Ireland
- National primary road
- National secondary road
