= Leitrim, County Leitrim =

Village in County Leitrim, Ireland

Leitrim Irish: Liatroim
- Village
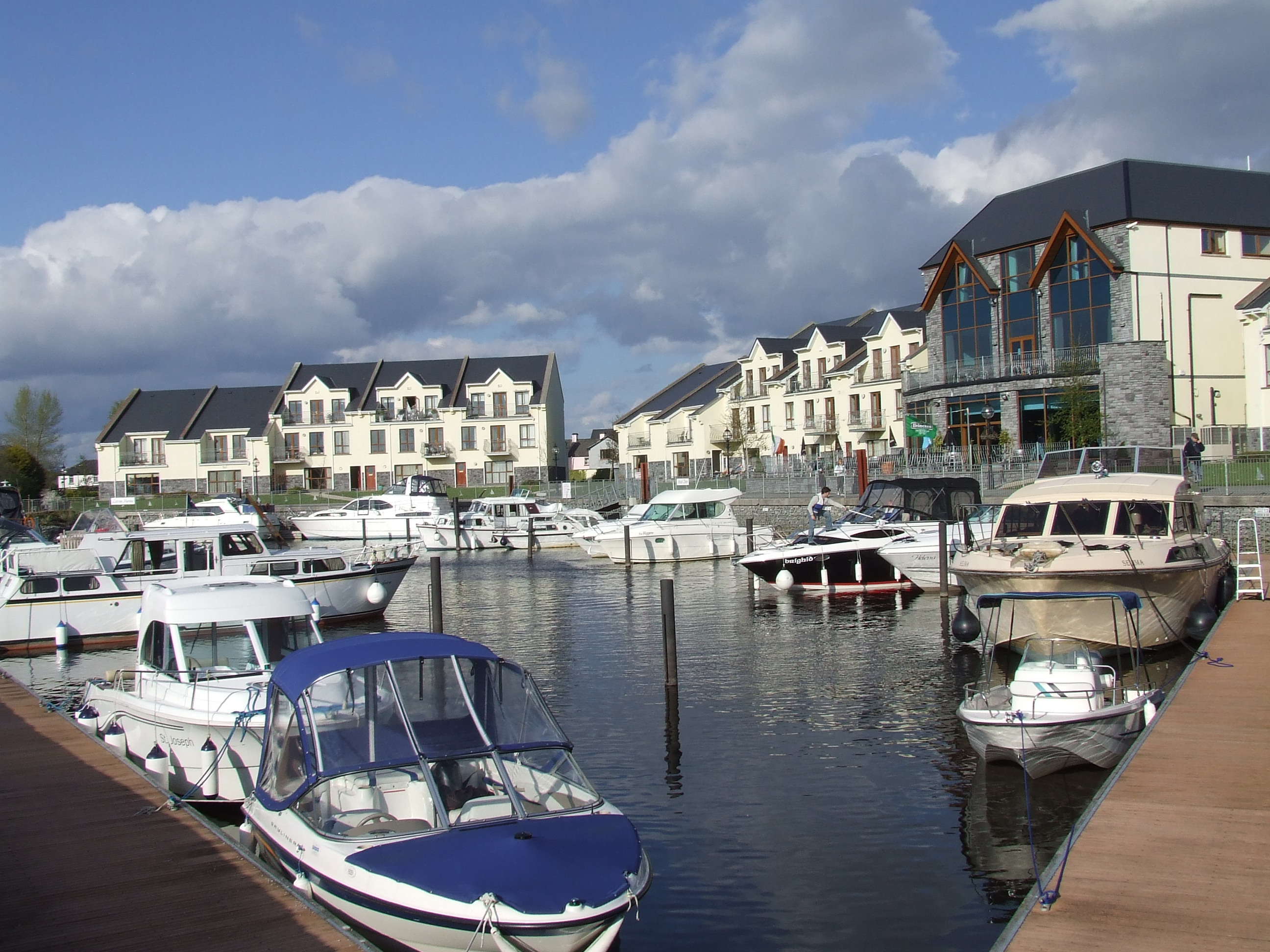
- Leitrim village marina

- Location in Ireland
- Coordinates: 53°59′27″N 8°03′49″W
- Country: Ireland
- Province: Connacht
- County: County Leitrim
- Elevation: 70 m (230 ft)

Population (2016)
  - Total: 594
- Time zone: UTC+0 (WET)
  - Summer (DST): UTC-1 (IST (WEST))
- Irish Grid Reference: G958046

Leitrim (/ˈliːtrəm/ LEE-trəm; Irish: Liatroim) is a village in County Leitrim, Ireland, on the River Shannon near the border with County Roscommon. It is at the junction of the R280 and R284 regional roads.

== Location ==
Located on the River Shannon, Leitrim village is connected to the River Erne via the Shannon-Erne Waterway. The river port has a quay, several jetties and two marinas, with facilities for cruising traffic. The village is about 5 kilometres (3 mi) from Carrick-on-Shannon.

== History ==
From the Early modern period, County Leitrim is named after the village. Throughout at least the 19th and 20th centuries, numerous annual fairs were held at Leitrim village on- 22 January, 20 February, 25 March, 5 May, 16 June, 23 July, September 1 (or 3rd), 13 October, and 1 December. In 1925, Leitrim village comprised 30 houses with 5 being licensed to sell alcohol.

Liatroim was a strategically important ford of the River Shannon connecting Ulster and Connacht. The Irish Annals makes mention of Leitrim village (Irish: Liath-druim) many times. In 1270, the Battle of Áth an Chip between Normans and Connacht probably occurred on Drumhierney townland beside Battle-bridge.

The county itself is named after the village of Leitrim near the River Shannon, which was an important stronghold during the Ó Ruairc (O'Rourke) family reign. The remains of O'Rourke's Castle can still be found in the village centre. The name 'Leitrim' itself is derived from the Irish Liath Druim, meaning 'grey ridge', and is a commonplace name throughout Ireland.

== Developments ==
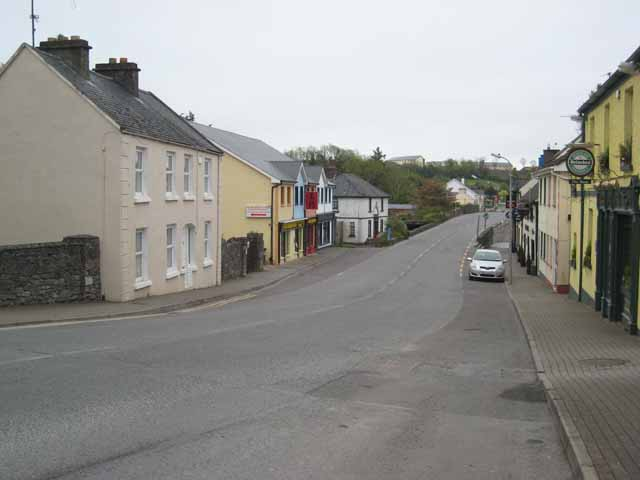
Leitrim's main street (2008)

Successive Finance Acts during the 1990s encouraged the building of hotels and holiday houses in designated deprived rural areas. Leitrim village was a beneficiary of these tax incentives. The resultant growth in the period between 2002 and 2007 saw several complexes of self-catering apartment blocks being erected around the marinas, one of which was funded by the International Fund for Ireland under the auspices of the Anglo-Irish Agreement. The village has had a number of successes in the National Tidy Towns competition. Leitrim village is used as a tourist base for the surrounding attractions such as the Arigna Mining Experience, Lough Rynn, Lough Key Forest Park, the Shannon-Erne Blueway and the nearby County Town of Carrick on Shannon.

== Education and religion ==
St Joseph's National School is the local primary school. The local Roman Catholic church is also dedicated to St Joseph.

== Demographics ==
The village had 274 residents in 1834. In 2016, the population was 594.

== See also ==
- List of towns and villages in Ireland
