= Ballygawley, County Sligo =

Village in County Sligo, Ireland

Ballygawley Baile Uí Dhálaigh
- Village
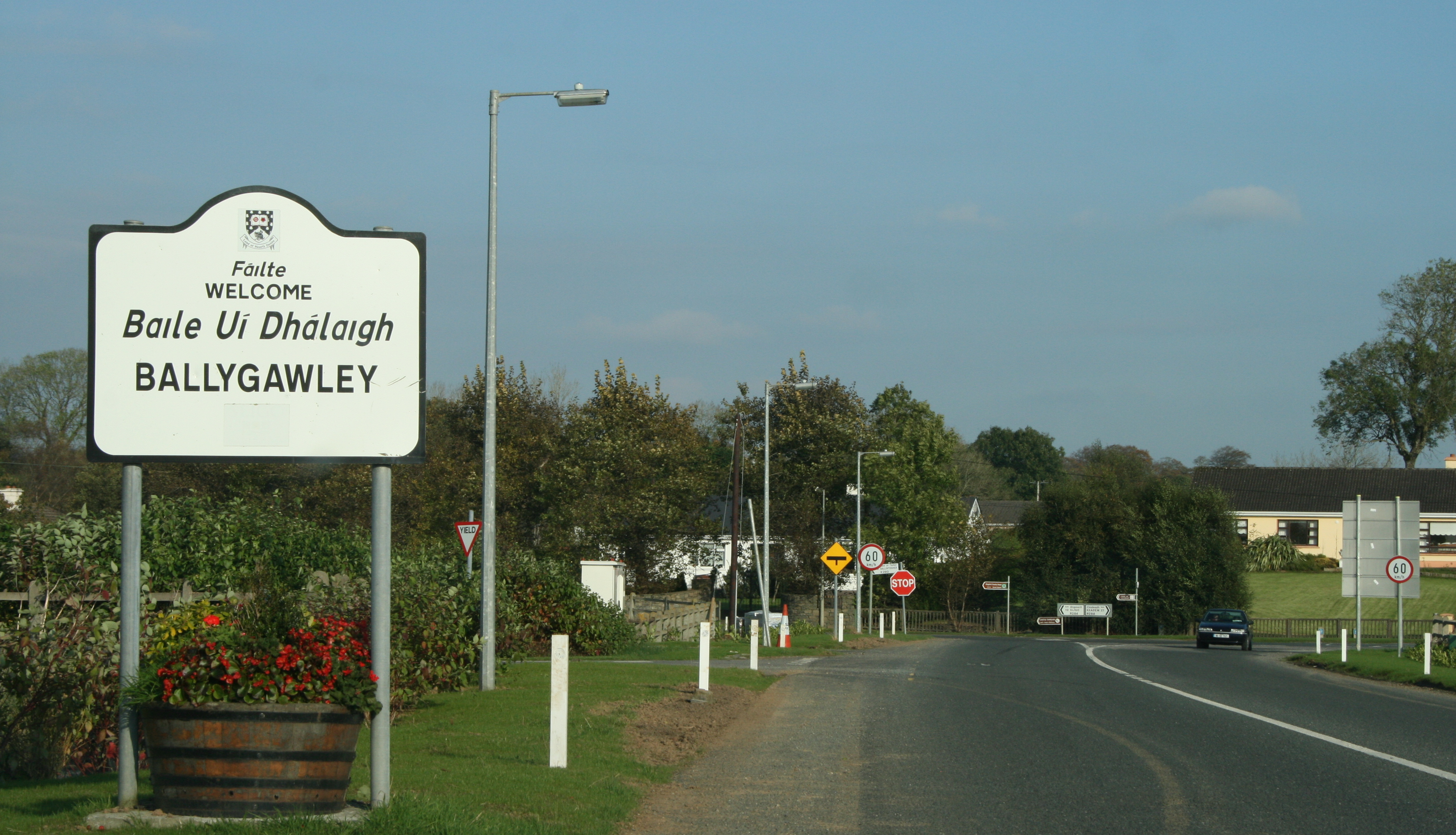
- Signage entering Ballygawley

- Location in Ireland
- Coordinates: 54°11′29″N 8°26′47″W
- Country: Ireland
- Province: Connacht
- County: County Sligo
- Elevation: 74 m (243 ft)

Population (2022)
  - Total: 285
- Time zone: UTC+0 (WET)
  - Summer (DST): UTC-1 (IST (WEST))
- Irish Grid Reference: G706272

Ballygawley (Irish: Baile Uí Dhálaigh, meaning 'Ó Dálaigh's townland') is a village in County Sligo, Ireland. It is located east of Collooney, approximately 10 km (6 mi) south of Sligo town and near the main Sligo-Dublin road, the N4. The Ó Dálaigh family, referenced in the town's Irish name, were professional poets active in Ireland during the Middle Ages.

== Sport ==
The hotel and golf course set around the ruins of the ancient castle Castle Dargan was opened in Ballygawley in 2005. The golf course was designed by Darren Clarke and is set in 170 acres (0.69 km^{2}) of mature woodlands.

== Places of interest ==
Ballygawley Mountains, a low mountain range which is an extension of the Ox Mountains include hills called Calliach a' Bhéara, Sliabh Deane, Sliabh Dargan and Aghamore Far. All these four have cairns at their summits. The hills are composed of a metamorphic rock called psammitic paragneiss. Near to Calliach a' Bhéara is a monument consisting of three stones, known locally as The Thief, the Boy and the Cow (Cloch a' Ghadai).

Ballygawley village has two pubs and two shops. One is connected with a petrol station. It also has a hairdresser and a post office. On the outskirts of the village there are two hotels, one being Castle Dargan with a golf course and spa, and Markree Castle with an archery range and stables.

== See also ==
- List of towns and villages in Ireland
