= List of townlands of County Kilkenny =

This is a list of all townlands (over 1600) in the County of Kilkenny. Each column header is a link to an article explaining it. Townlands written in capitals are towns, villages etc. these correspond with xx in the area box. Muni. stands for Municipality (Borough of). This list is separated alphabetically.

== A ==
Townland	Other Names	Acres	County	Barony	Civil parish	Poor law union
Abbeygrove		59	Kilkenny	Gowran	Blanchvilleskill	Kilkenny
Acragar		438	Kilkenny	Galmoy	Rathbeagh	Urlingford
Acraroe		63	Kilkenny	Shillelogher	Tullaghanbrogue	Callan
Adamstown Lower		189	Kilkenny	Crannagh	Tullaroan	Kilkenny
Adamstown Upper		284	Kilkenny	Crannagh	Tullaroan	Kilkenny
Afaddy	Silverspring	165	Kilkenny	Iverk	Ballytarsney	Waterford
Afaddy	Silverspring	77	Kilkenny	Iverk	Pollrone	Waterford
Agha		261	Kilkenny	Gowran	Rathcoole	Kilkenny
Aghamucky		1,061	Kilkenny	Fassadinin	Castlecomer	Castlecomer
Aghaviller		208	Kilkenny	Knocktopher	Aghaviller	Thomastown
Aghclare		269	Kilkenny	Gowran	Graiguenamanagh	Thomastown
Aghenderry		170	Kilkenny	Shillelogher	Tullaghanbrogue	Callan
Aghinraheen		319	Kilkenny	Shillelogher	Tullaghanbrogue	Callan
Aglish North		235	Kilkenny	Iverk	Aglish	Waterford
Aglish South		291	Kilkenny	Iverk	Aglish	Waterford
Ahanure North		419	Kilkenny	Kells	Coolaghmore	Callan
Ahanure South		375	Kilkenny	Kells	Coolaghmore	Callan
Annaghs		565	Kilkenny	Ida	Shanbogh	New Ross
Annaleck Lower		170	Kilkenny	Gowran	Powerstown	Thomastown
Annaleck Upper		272	Kilkenny	Gowran	Powerstown	Thomastown
Annamult		1,351	Kilkenny	Shillelogher	Danesfort	Thomastown
Annefield		78	Kilkenny	Ida	Rosbercon	New Ross
Annfield		83	Kilkenny	Gowran	Dunbell	Kilkenny
Archergrove		102	Kilkenny	Shillelogher	St. Patrick's	Kilkenny
Archerslea		147	Kilkenny	Shillelogher	St. Patrick's	Kilkenny
Archersrath		107	Kilkenny	Gowran	St. John's	Kilkenny
Archerstreet Lot		88	Kilkenny	Shillelogher	St. Canice	Kilkenny
Ardaloo		401	Kilkenny	Fassadinin	Grangemaccomb	Kilkenny
Ardbeg		265	Kilkenny	Ida	Kilcolumb	Waterford
Ardboy		43	Kilkenny	Crannagh	St. Canice	Kilkenny
Ardclone		291	Kilkenny	Iverk	Fiddown	Carrick on Suir
Arderra		583	Kilkenny	Iverk	Arderra	Waterford
Ardra		770	Kilkenny	Fassadinin	Castlecomer	Castlecomer
Ardreagh		297	Kilkenny	Galmoy	Urlingford	Urlingford
Ardscradaun		12	Kilkenny	Shillelogher	St. Patrick's	Kilkenny
Ashglen	Glennafunshoge	68	Kilkenny	Gowran	Woolengrange	Thomastown
Ashtown		766	Kilkenny	Knocktopher	Fiddown	Carrick on Suir
Atateemore	Blackneys	173	Kilkenny	Ida	Kilcolumb	Waterford
Attateenoe Lower		81	Kilkenny	Kells	Coolaghmore	Callan
Attateenoe Upper		133	Kilkenny	Kells	Coolaghmore	Callan
Aughatubbrid	Chatsworth	1,651	Kilkenny	Fassadinin	Castlecomer	Castlecomer
Aughkiletaum		462	Kilkenny	Gowran	Powerstown	Thomastown
Aughtanny		171	Kilkenny	Shillelogher	Castleinch or Inchyolaghan	Kilkenny
Aylwardstown		555	Kilkenny	Ida	Kilmakevoge	Waterford
Ayresfields		43	Kilkenny	Crannagh	St. Canice	Kilkenny

== B ==
Townland	Other Names	Acres	County	Barony	Civil parish	Poor law union
BALLINCREA T.		xx	Kilkenny	Ida	Kilcolumb	Waterford
BALLYGOREY T.		xx	Kilkenny	Iverk	Portnascully	Waterford
BALLYGUB NEW T.		xx	Kilkenny	Ida	Clonamery	Thomastown
BALLYHALE T.		xx	Kilkenny	Knocktopher	Derrynahinch	Thomastown
BALLYNAMONA T.		xx	Kilkenny	Ida	Dunkitt	Waterford
BALLYRAGGET T.		xx	Kilkenny	Fassadinin	Donaghmore	Castlecomer
BAUNSKEHA T.		xx	Kilkenny	Gowran	Jerpoint West	Thomastown
BENNETTSBRIDGE T.		xx	Kilkenny	Shillelogher	Danesfort	Thomastown
BENNETTSBRIDGE T.		xx	Kilkenny	Gowran	Treadingstown	Thomastown
BOOLYGLASS T.		xx	Kilkenny	Knocktopher	Aghaviller	Carrick on Suir
Badgerrock		125	Kilkenny	Gowran	Kilfane	Thomastown
Balief Lower		230	Kilkenny	Crannagh	Clomantagh	Urlingford
Balief Upper		253	Kilkenny	Crannagh	Clomantagh	Urlingford
Ballagh		98	Kilkenny	Crannagh	Kilmanagh	Callan
Ballaghcloneen		285	Kilkenny	Crannagh	Tullaroan	Kilkenny
Ballallog		362	Kilkenny	Ida	Listerlin	New Ross
Balleen Little		16	Kilkenny	Galmoy	Balleen	Urlingford
Balleen Lower		592	Kilkenny	Galmoy	Balleen	Urlingford
Balleen Upper	Baunmore	146	Kilkenny	Galmoy	Balleen	Urlingford
Balleven		293	Kilkenny	Crannagh	Ballycallan	Kilkenny
Ballilogue		664	Kilkenny	Ida	The Rower	New Ross
Ballinabarney		557	Kilkenny	Ida	The Rower	New Ross
Ballinclare		324	Kilkenny	Ida	Kilcolumb	Waterford
Ballincrea		590	Kilkenny	Ida	Kilcolumb	Waterford
Ballincurra		59	Kilkenny	Iverk	Rathkieran	Waterford
Ballincurra North		100	Kilkenny	Iverk	Arderra	Waterford
Ballincurra South		93	Kilkenny	Iverk	Arderra	Waterford
Ballincurragh		158	Kilkenny	Ida	Gaulskill	Waterford
Ballinlammy		611	Kilkenny	Ida	Kilcolumb	Waterford
Ballinlaw		75	Kilkenny	Ida	Kilcolumb	Waterford
Ballinlaw		348	Kilkenny	Ida	Rathpatrick	Waterford
Ballinlough		53	Kilkenny	Iverk	Rathkieran	Waterford
Ballintarsna		128	Kilkenny	Crannagh	Tullaroan	Kilkenny
Ballintee		348	Kilkenny	Kells	Dunnamaggin	Callan
Ballinteskin		506	Kilkenny	Knocktopher	Aghaviller	Carrick on Suir
Ballintlea		279	Kilkenny	Knocktopher	Rossinan	Waterford
Ballintober		261	Kilkenny	Knocktopher	Killahy	Waterford
Ballinva		132	Kilkenny	Knocktopher	Aghaviller	Thomastown
Ballinva North		101	Kilkenny	Knocktopher	Killahy	Waterford
Ballinva South		36	Kilkenny	Knocktopher	Killahy	Waterford
Ballinvally		1,030	Kilkenny	Gowran	Kilmacahill	Kilkenny
Ballinvarry		121	Kilkenny	Ida	The Rower	Thomastown
Ballinvarry English		449	Kilkenny	Ida	The Rower	Thomastown
Ballinvarry Irish		157	Kilkenny	Ida	The Rower	Thomastown
Ballybeagh		1,124	Kilkenny	Crannagh	Tullaroan	Kilkenny
Ballybeg		233	Kilkenny	Ida	Rosbercon	New Ross
Ballyboodan		276	Kilkenny	Knocktopher	Knocktopher	Thomastown
Ballybraghy		160	Kilkenny	Ida	Kilcoan	Waterford
Ballybrassil		260	Kilkenny	Iverk	Pollrone	Waterford
Ballybray		427	Kilkenny	Knocktopher	Kilkeasy	Thomastown
Ballybur		32	Kilkenny	Shillelogher	Tullaghanbrogue	Callan
Ballybur Lower		275	Kilkenny	Shillelogher	Ballybur	Kilkenny
Ballybur Upper		392	Kilkenny	Shillelogher	Ballybur	Kilkenny
Ballybush		10	Kilkenny	Shillelogher	Killaloe	Callan
Ballycabus		130	Kilkenny	Gowran	Powerstown	Thomastown
Ballycallan		331	Kilkenny	Crannagh	Ballycallan	Kilkenny
Ballycannon		362	Kilkenny	Crannagh	Ballinamara	Kilkenny
Ballycarran		296	Kilkenny	Crannagh	Odagh	Kilkenny
Ballycarran Little		112	Kilkenny	Crannagh	Odagh	Kilkenny
Ballyclovan		192	Kilkenny	Callan	Callan	Callan
Ballyclovan Meadows		42	Kilkenny	Callan	Callan	Callan
Ballycoam		100	Kilkenny	Knocktopher	Ennisnag	Thomastown
Ballycocksoost		801	Kilkenny	Gowran	Inistioge	Thomastown
Ballycommon		122	Kilkenny	Ida	The Rower	New Ross
Ballycomy		269	Kilkenny	Fassadinin	Dysart	Castlecomer
Ballyconnaught		204	Kilkenny	Ida	Dysartmoon	New Ross
Ballyconra		1,153	Kilkenny	Galmoy	Aharney	Urlingford
Ballyconway		485	Kilkenny	Knocktopher	Jerpointchurch	Thomastown
Ballycrony		498	Kilkenny	Ida	Ballygurrim	New Ross
Ballycuddihy		408	Kilkenny	Galmoy	Fertagh	Urlingford
Ballycuddihy		575	Kilkenny	Crannagh	Tullaroan	Kilkenny
Ballycurrin		348	Kilkenny	Ida	Listerlin	New Ross
Ballyda		339	Kilkenny	Shillelogher	Danesfort	Thomastown
Ballydaniel		377	Kilkenny	Crannagh	Odagh	Kilkenny
Ballydaw		506	Kilkenny	Iverk	Kilmacow	Waterford
Ballydonnell		108	Kilkenny	Gowran	Ballylinch	Thomastown
Ballydonnell		136	Kilkenny	Galmoy	Erke	Urlingford
Ballydowan		51	Kilkenny	Knocktopher	Derrynahinch	Thomastown
Ballydowel Big		489	Kilkenny	Crannagh	Ballinamara	Kilkenny
Ballydowel Little		230	Kilkenny	Crannagh	Ballinamara	Kilkenny
Ballyduff		167	Kilkenny	Gowran	Graiguenamanagh	Thomastown
Ballyduff		234	Kilkenny	Gowran	Inistioge	Thomastown
Ballydun		200	Kilkenny	Crannagh	Ballycallan	Kilkenny
Ballyeden		129	Kilkenny	Ida	Shanbogh	New Ross
Ballyellis		165	Kilkenny	Galmoy	Erke	Urlingford
Ballyfasy Lower		349	Kilkenny	Ida	Kilbride	Waterford
Ballyfasy Upper		647	Kilkenny	Ida	Kilbride	Waterford
Ballyfereen		179	Kilkenny	Ida	The Rower	New Ross
Ballyfliugh		234	Kilkenny	Kells	Coolaghmore	Callan
Ballyfoile Lower		113	Kilkenny	Ida	Dysartmoon	New Ross
Ballyfoile Upper		207	Kilkenny	Ida	Dysartmoon	New Ross
Ballyfoyle		1,431	Kilkenny	Gowran	Kilmadum	Kilkenny
Ballyfrunk		279	Kilkenny	Crannagh	Ballycallan	Kilkenny
Ballygallon		338	Kilkenny	Gowran	Inistioge	Thomastown
Ballygeardra		793	Kilkenny	Knocktopher	Knocktopher	Thomastown
Ballygegan		158	Kilkenny	Gowran	Inistioge	Thomastown
Ballyglassoon		160	Kilkenny	Iverk	Fiddown	Carrick on Suir
Ballygorey		488	Kilkenny	Iverk	Portnascully	Waterford
Ballygorteen		976	Kilkenny	Gowran	Shankill	Kilkenny
Ballygowan (Ponsonby)		395	Kilkenny	Kells	Kilmaganny	Carrick on Suir
Ballygowan (Reade)		374	Kilkenny	Kells	Kilmaganny	Callan
Ballygown		405	Kilkenny	Iverk	Fiddown	Carrick on Suir
Ballygowney		651	Kilkenny	Galmoy	Coolcashin	Urlingford
Ballygowney		265	Kilkenny	Galmoy	Sheffin	Urlingford
Ballygreek		134	Kilkenny	Knocktopher	Rossinan	Waterford
Ballygriffin		167	Kilkenny	Iverk	Kilmacow	Waterford
Ballygub New		1,553	Kilkenny	Ida	Clonamery	Thomastown
Ballygub Old		252	Kilkenny	Ida	Clonamery	Thomastown
Ballyhack		59	Kilkenny	Crannagh	Ballycallan	Kilkenny
Ballyhale		368	Kilkenny	Knocktopher	Derrynahinch	Thomastown
Ballyhall		279	Kilkenny	Kells	Ballytobin	Callan
Ballyhendricken		491	Kilkenny	Crannagh	Ballycallan	Kilkenny
Ballyhenebery		463	Kilkenny	Iverk	Owning	Carrick on Suir
Ballyhenebery		85	Kilkenny	Iverk	Whitechurch	Carrick on Suir
Ballyhimmin		239	Kilkenny	Knocktopher	Killahy	Waterford
Ballyhimmin		347	Kilkenny	Fassadinin	Kilmacar	Castlecomer
Ballyhobuck		281	Kilkenny	Ida	Kilcolumb	Waterford
Ballyhomuck		385	Kilkenny	Ida	Dunkitt	Waterford
Ballyjohnboy		113	Kilkenny	Gowran	Ullard	Thomastown
Ballykeefe		14	Kilkenny	Crannagh	Kilmanagh	Callan
Ballykeefe		213	Kilkenny	Crannagh	Tullaghanbrogue	Callan
Ballykeefe Bog		306	Kilkenny	Crannagh	Killaloe	Callan
Ballykeefe Hill		230	Kilkenny	Crannagh	Tullaghanbrogue	Callan
Ballykeefecastle		293	Kilkenny	Crannagh	Tullaghanbrogue	Callan
Ballykenna		586	Kilkenny	Ida	Dysartmoon	New Ross
Ballykeoghan		381	Kilkenny	Ida	Dunkitt	Waterford
Ballykeoghan		69	Kilkenny	Gowran	Kilfane	Thomastown
Ballykeoghan		45	Kilkenny	Gowran	Tullaherin	Thomastown
Ballykieran	Frankford	457	Kilkenny	Galmoy	Balleen	Urlingford
Ballykillaboy		350	Kilkenny	Ida	Dunkitt	Waterford
Ballykillaboy		64	Kilkenny	Ida	Gaulskill	Waterford
Ballyknock		457	Kilkenny	Ida	Dysartmoon	New Ross
Ballyknockbeg		196	Kilkenny	Knocktopher	Killahy	Waterford
Ballyknockmore		223	Kilkenny	Knocktopher	Lismateige	Thomastown
Ballylarkin		161	Kilkenny	Shillelogher	Killaloe	Callan
Ballylarkin Lower		370	Kilkenny	Crannagh	Ballylarkin	Kilkenny
Ballylarkin Upper		540	Kilkenny	Crannagh	Ballylarkin	Kilkenny
Ballylehaun		418	Kilkenny	Galmoy	Glashare	Urlingford
Ballylinch Demesne		817	Kilkenny	Gowran	Ballylinch	Thomastown
Ballyline		360	Kilkenny	Shillelogher	Killaloe	Callan
Ballylinnen		659	Kilkenny	Fassadinin	Castlecomer	Castlecomer
Ballylowra		342	Kilkenny	Knocktopher	Jerpointchurch	Thomastown
Ballylusky		325	Kilkenny	Knocktopher	Kilbeacon	Waterford
Ballymack (Desart)		374	Kilkenny	Shillelogher	Burnchurch	Callan
Ballymack (Flood)		200	Kilkenny	Shillelogher	Burnchurch	Callan
Ballymackillagill		398	Kilkenny	Knocktopher	Listerlin	New Ross
Ballymartin		875	Kilkenny	Fassadinin	Donaghmore	Castlecomer
Ballymartin		821	Kilkenny	Knocktopher	Listerlin	New Ross
Ballymorris		42	Kilkenny	Knocktopher	Killahy	Waterford
Ballymountain		392	Kilkenny	Ida	Dunkitt	Waterford
Ballymurragh		167	Kilkenny	Gowran	Ullard	Thomastown
Ballynaboley		685	Kilkenny	Gowran	Tullaherin	Thomastown
Ballynaboley		865	Kilkenny	Iverk	Ullid	Waterford
Ballynacooly		158	Kilkenny	Knocktopher	Killahy	Waterford
Ballynacronny		425	Kilkenny	Iverk	Owning	Carrick on Suir
Ballynakill		274	Kilkenny	Gowran	Graiguenamanagh	Thomastown
Ballynakill		306	Kilkenny	Knocktopher	Rossinan	Waterford
Ballynalacken		940	Kilkenny	Fassadinin	Donaghmore	Castlecomer
Ballynalina		290	Kilkenny	Shillelogher	St. Canice	Kilkenny
Ballynalinagh		536	Kilkenny	Kells	Tullahought	Carrick on Suir
Ballynametagh		86	Kilkenny	Iverk	Fiddown	Carrick on Suir
Ballynamona		53	Kilkenny	Gowran	Blackrath	Kilkenny
Ballynamona		53	Kilkenny	Gowran	Clara	Kilkenny
Ballynamona		155	Kilkenny	Ida	Dunkitt	Waterford
Ballynamona		389	Kilkenny	Knocktopher	Jerpointchurch	Thomastown
Ballynamona		79	Kilkenny	Ida	Kilcolumb	Waterford
Ballynamorahan		104	Kilkenny	Ida	Gaulskill	Waterford
Ballynamountain		89	Kilkenny	Iverk	Rathkieran	Waterford
Ballynaraha		290	Kilkenny	Ida	Kilmakevoge	Waterford
Ballynaraha North		38	Kilkenny	Knocktopher	Killahy	Waterford
Ballynaraha South		181	Kilkenny	Knocktopher	Killahy	Waterford
Ballynascarry (Butler)		40	Kilkenny	Crannagh	Tubbridbritain	Urlingford
Ballynascarry (Gore)		216	Kilkenny	Crannagh	Tubbridbritain	Urlingford
Ballynaslee		668	Kilkenny	Galmoy	Durrow	Urlingford
Ballyneale		167	Kilkenny	Ida	Dysartmoon	New Ross
Ballyneale		341	Kilkenny	Ida	Listerlin	New Ross
Ballynearla		467	Kilkenny	Iverk	Kilmacow	Waterford
Ballynolan		87	Kilkenny	Crannagh	Ballinamara	Kilkenny
Ballynoony East		417	Kilkenny	Knocktopher	Kilbeacon	Waterford
Ballynoony West		1,326	Kilkenny	Knocktopher	Kilbeacon	Waterford
Ballynunry		349	Kilkenny	Ida	The Rower	New Ross
Ballyogan		1,225	Kilkenny	Gowran	Graiguenamanagh	Thomastown
Ballyoskill		1,053	Kilkenny	Fassadinin	Attanagh	Castlecomer
Ballyoskill		480	Kilkenny	Fassadinin	Kilmenan	Castlecomer
Ballypatrick		38	Kilkenny	Iverk	Fiddown	Carrick on Suir
Ballyphilip		247	Kilkenny	Crannagh	Ballylarkin	Kilkenny
Ballyquin		544	Kilkenny	Knocktopher	Rossinan	Waterford
Ballyquirk		523	Kilkenny	Gowran	Gowran	Kilkenny
Ballyrafton		283	Kilkenny	Fassadinin	Dunmore	Kilkenny
Ballyragget		715	Kilkenny	Fassadinin	Donaghmore	Castlecomer
Ballyrahan		146	Kilkenny	Ida	Kilcolumb	Waterford
Ballyredding		235	Kilkenny	Gowran	Treadingstown	Thomastown
Ballyredding		53	Kilkenny	Gowran	Treadingstown	Thomastown
Ballyredding		18	Kilkenny	Shillelogher	Treadingstown	Thomastown
Ballyreddy		316	Kilkenny	Ida	Dysartmoon	New Ross
Ballyring Lower		172	Kilkenny	Galmoy	Sheffin	Urlingford
Ballyring Upper		350	Kilkenny	Galmoy	Sheffin	Urlingford
Ballyroberts		146	Kilkenny	Shillelogher	Burnchurch	Callan
Ballyroe		61	Kilkenny	Gowran	Columbkille	Thomastown
Ballyroe		171	Kilkenny	Crannagh	Freshford	Kilkenny
Ballyroe (Grace)		220	Kilkenny	Crannagh	Tullaroan	Kilkenny
Ballyroe (Maher)		201	Kilkenny	Crannagh	Tullaroan	Kilkenny
Ballyrowragh		322	Kilkenny	Ida	Kilcolumb	Waterford
Ballysallagh		617	Kilkenny	Gowran	Kilderry	Kilkenny
Ballyshane		319	Kilkenny	Gowran	Inistioge	Thomastown
Ballyspellan		1,076	Kilkenny	Galmoy	Fertagh	Urlingford
Ballytarsna		694	Kilkenny	Knocktopher	Derrynahinch	Thomastown
Ballytarsna		213	Kilkenny	Gowran	Shankill	Kilkenny
Ballytarsney		361	Kilkenny	Iverk	Ballytarsney	Waterford
Ballytarsney		71	Kilkenny	Iverk	Pollrone	Waterford
Ballytarsney		55	Kilkenny	Iverk	Rathkieran	Waterford
Ballytobin		298	Kilkenny	Kells	Ballytobin	Callan
Ballywairy		322	Kilkenny	Ida	Kilbride	Waterford
Ballywairy		160	Kilkenny	Ida	Kilcoan	Waterford
Ballyvalden		475	Kilkenny	Gowran	Shankill	Kilkenny
Ballywalter		230	Kilkenny	Callan	Callan	Callan
Ballyvarring		242	Kilkenny	Ida	Kilcolumb	Waterford
Ballyvatheen		103	Kilkenny	Knocktopher	Kilbeacon	Waterford
Ballyverneen		273	Kilkenny	Ida	Ballygurrim	New Ross
Ballyvool		467	Kilkenny	Gowran	Inistioge	Thomastown
Ballyvoulera	Moulerstown	323	Kilkenny	Ida	Kilcoan	Waterford
Banagher		221	Kilkenny	Iverk	Fiddown	Carrick on Suir
Banse Glebe		322	Kilkenny	Crannagh	Kilmanagh	Callan
Barna		193	Kilkenny	Crannagh	Clomantagh	Urlingford
Barna		91	Kilkenny	Crannagh	Fertagh	Urlingford
Barnacole		120	Kilkenny	Iverk	Tubbrid	Carrick on Suir
Barnadown		551	Kilkenny	Knocktopher	Aghaviller	Thomastown
Barnaviddaun North		97	Kilkenny	Gowran	Ullard	Thomastown
Barnaviddaun South		58	Kilkenny	Gowran	Ullard	Thomastown
Baronsland		36	Kilkenny	Gowran	Tullaherin	Thomastown
Baronsland		83	Kilkenny	Gowran	Woolengrange	Thomastown
Barrabehy		539	Kilkenny	Iverk	Tubbrid	Carrick on Suir
Barrackhill (Barton)		97	Kilkenny	Crannagh	Ballycallan	Kilkenny
Barrackhill (Cranesborough)		67	Kilkenny	Crannagh	Ballycallan	Kilkenny
Barravally		149	Kilkenny	Kells	Kilmaganny	Callan
Barrettstown		576	Kilkenny	Knocktopher	Knocktopher	Thomastown
Barronsknock		10	Kilkenny	Kells	Kells	Callan
Barrowmount		725	Kilkenny	Gowran	Grangesilvia	Thomastown
Bartonsfarm		64	Kilkenny	Knocktopher	Aghaviller	Thomastown
Baun		157	Kilkenny	Gowran	St. John's	Kilkenny
Baunanattin		22	Kilkenny	Knocktopher	Knocktopher	Thomastown
Baunaniska		242	Kilkenny	Crannagh	Freshford	Kilkenny
Baunastackaun		123	Kilkenny	Gowran	Graiguenamanagh	Thomastown
Baunatillaun		14	Kilkenny	Kells	Dunnamaggin	Callan
Baunavollaboy		20	Kilkenny	Shillelogher	Stonecarthy	Thomastown
Baunballinlough		601	Kilkenny	Galmoy	Erke	Urlingford
Bauneen		59	Kilkenny	Kells	Coolaghmore	Callan
Baunemon		148	Kilkenny	Kells	Kells	Callan
Baunfree		230	Kilkenny	Kells	Tullahought	Carrick on Suir
Baungarriff		162	Kilkenny	Crannagh	Ballycallan	Kilkenny
Baungarriff		148	Kilkenny	Iverk	Whitechurch	Carrick on Suir
Baungarrow		163	Kilkenny	Galmoy	Fertagh	Urlingford
Baunlusk		216	Kilkenny	Shillelogher	Grange	Kilkenny
Baunmore	Balleen Upper	146	Kilkenny	Galmoy	Balleen	Urlingford
Baunmore		101	Kilkenny	Gowran	Clara	Kilkenny
Baunmore		3,092	Kilkenny	Galmoy	Erke	Urlingford
Baunnageloge		175	Kilkenny	Ida	Dunkitt	Waterford
Baunnaraha		224	Kilkenny	Crannagh	Ballycallan	Kilkenny
Baunoge		159	Kilkenny	Callan	Callan	Callan
Baunreagh		6	Kilkenny	Callan	Callan	Callan
Baunreagh		175	Kilkenny	Kells	Kilmaganny	Callan
Baunreagh		151	Kilkenny	Shillelogher	St. Patrick's	Kilkenny
Baunreagh		158	Kilkenny	Shillelogher	Stonecarthy	Thomastown
Baunreagh		153	Kilkenny	Kells	Tullahought	Callan
Baunrickeen		119	Kilkenny	Galmoy	Fertagh	Urlingford
Baunskcha		909	Kilkenny	Gowran	Jerpoint West	Thomastown
Baunta		90	Kilkenny	Callan	Callan	Callan
Baunta Commons		418	Kilkenny	Callan	Callan	Callan
Bauntabarna		75	Kilkenny	Gowran	Graiguenamanagh	Thomastown
Baurnafea		1,159	Kilkenny	Gowran	Shankill	Kilkenny
Bawnhubbamaddereen		77	Kilkenny	Kells	Dunnamaggin	Callan
Bawntanameenagh		110	Kilkenny	Crannagh	Freshford	Kilkenny
Baysrath		222	Kilkenny	Kells	Dunnamaggin	Callan
Baysrath		4	Kilkenny	Knocktopher	Dunnamaggin	Thomastown
Bayswell		620	Kilkenny	Galmoy	Erke	Urlingford
Beatin		182	Kilkenny	Iverk	Owning	Carrick on Suir
Belline & Rogerstown		648	Kilkenny	Iverk	Fiddown	Carrick on Suir
Belville		171	Kilkenny	Crannagh	Garranamanagh	Urlingford
Bennettsbridge		450	Kilkenny	Shillelogher	Danesfort	Thomastown
Bennettsbridge		403	Kilkenny	Gowran	Treadingstown	Thomastown
Bennettsmeadow		2	Kilkenny	Callan	Callan	Callan
Bigbog		137	Kilkenny	Crannagh	Ballycallan	Kilkenny
Bigmeadow		14	Kilkenny	Callan	Callan	Callan
Bigmeadow		38	Kilkenny	Crannagh	Killaloe	Callan
Birchfield		158	Kilkenny	Shillelogher	St. Patrick's	Kilkenny
Birchwood		176	Kilkenny	Kells	Tullahought	Carrick on Suir
Bishops Demesne		54	Kilkenny	Crannagh	St. Canice	Kilkenny
Bishopsfurze		71	Kilkenny	Crannagh	St. Canice	Kilkenny
Bishopshall		240	Kilkenny	Ida	Gaulskill	Waterford
Bishopsknock		27	Kilkenny	Ida	The Rower	New Ross
Bishopsland		190	Kilkenny	Ida	Clonamery	Thomastown
Bishopslough East		15	Kilkenny	Gowran	Tullaherin	Thomastown
Bishopslough Newtown		574	Kilkenny	Gowran	Tullaherin	Thomastown
Bishopslough South		189	Kilkenny	Gowran	Tullaherin	Thomastown
Bishopslough West		98	Kilkenny	Gowran	Tullaherin	Thomastown
Bishopsmeadows		50	Kilkenny	Crannagh	Odagh	Kilkenny
Bishopsmeadows		32	Kilkenny	Crannagh	St. Canice	Kilkenny
Bishopsmountain		404	Kilkenny	Ida	Rossinan	Waterford
Blackbog		426	Kilkenny	Kells	Kilmaganny	Carrick on Suir
Blackbotttom		117	Kilkenny	Crannagh	Killahy	Urlingford
Blackneys	Atateemore	173	Kilkenny	Ida	Kilcolumb	Waterford
Blackstaff		23	Kilkenny	Callan	Callan	Callan
Blackwell		160	Kilkenny	Gowran	Tullaherin	Thomastown
Blackwood		375	Kilkenny	Galmoy	Rathbeagh	Urlingford
Blanchfieldsbog		168	Kilkenny	Crannagh	Tubbridbritain	Urlingford
Blanchfieldsland		116	Kilkenny	Gowran	St. John's	Kilkenny
Blanchville Demesne		179	Kilkenny	Gowran	Blanchvilleskill	Kilkenny
Blanchvilleskill		98	Kilkenny	Gowran	Gowran	Kilkenny
Blanchvilleskill		31	Kilkenny	Gowran	Tiscoffin	Kilkenny
Blanchvillespark		902	Kilkenny	Gowran	Gowran	Kilkenny
Blanchvillestown		396	Kilkenny	Gowran	Blanchvilleskill	Kilkenny
Blanchvillestown		106	Kilkenny	Gowran	Gowran	Kilkenny
Bleachgreen		12	Kilkenny	Gowran	St. John's	Kilkenny
Blessington		206	Kilkenny	Gowran	Columbkille	Thomastown
Blessington		104	Kilkenny	Gowran	Inistioge	Thomastown
Blessington		120	Kilkenny	Gowran	Kilfane	Thomastown
Blossomhill		92	Kilkenny	Ida	Dunkitt	Waterford
Bodal		170	Kilkenny	Gowran	Dungarvan	Kilkenny
Bodalmore		314	Kilkenny	Shillelogher	Outrath	Kilkenny
Bog Commons		93	Kilkenny	Kells	Coolaghmore	Callan
Boggan		460	Kilkenny	Crannagh	Tullaroan	Kilkenny
Boheragaddy		250	Kilkenny	Gowran	Tullaherin	Thomastown
Boherawarraga		8	Kilkenny	Kells	Coolaghmore	Callan
Boherkyle		44	Kilkenny	Crannagh	Freshford	Kilkenny
Boherkyle		301	Kilkenny	Gowran	Powerstown	Thomastown
Bohermore		46	Kilkenny	Gowran	Graiguenamanagh	Thomastown
Bohernastrekaun	Killure	253	Kilkenny	Gowran	Wells	Kilkenny
Bohilla		223	Kilkenny	Gowran	Inistioge	Thomastown
Bolton		133	Kilkenny	Callan	Callan	Callan
Bonnetsrath		269	Kilkenny	Gowran	St. John's	Kilkenny
Bonnetstown		574	Kilkenny	Crannagh	St. Canice	Kilkenny
Booly		261	Kilkenny	Shillelogher	Burnchurch	Callan
Boolyglass		876	Kilkenny	Knocktopher	Aghaviller	Carrick on Suir
Boolyshea		168	Kilkenny	Crannagh	St. Canice	Kilkenny
Bootstown (Connor)		186	Kilkenny	Crannagh	Ballinamara	Kilkenny
Bootstown (Cox)		199	Kilkenny	Crannagh	Ballinamara	Kilkenny
Borris Big		41	Kilkenny	Fassadinin	Odagh	Kilkenny
Borris Little		7	Kilkenny	Fassadinin	Odagh	Kilkenny
Borrisbeg		218	Kilkenny	Galmoy	Urlingford	Urlingford
Borrismore		1,087	Kilkenny	Galmoy	Borrismore	Urlingford
Bowersacre		1	Kilkenny	Knocktopher	Knocktopher	Thomastown
Brabstown		151	Kilkenny	Ida	Listerlin	New Ross
Brabstown		200	Kilkenny	Crannagh	Tullaroan	Kilkenny
Brackin		102	Kilkenny	Fassadinin	Mayne	Kilkenny
Brambletown		1,442	Kilkenny	Gowran	Dungarvan	Thomastown
Brandondale		65	Kilkenny	Gowran	Graiguenamanagh	Thomastown
Brandonhill		1,654	Kilkenny	Gowran	Graiguenamanagh	Thomastown
Brandonhill		1,057	Kilkenny	Ida	The Rower	Thomastown
Bregaun		243	Kilkenny	Kells	Tullahought	Carrick on Suir
Brenar		311	Kilkenny	Iverk	Fiddown	Carrick on Suir
Brickana		200	Kilkenny	Gowran	Gowran	Kilkenny
Briskalagh		85	Kilkenny	Crannagh	Tullaroan	Kilkenny
Brittas	New England	551	Kilkenny	Crannagh	Tullaroan	Kilkenny
Brittasdryland		611	Kilkenny	Crannagh	Kilmanagh	Callan
Broadmore		102	Kilkenny	Callan	Callan	Callan
Brownmountain		134	Kilkenny	Iverk	Owning	Carrick on Suir
Brownsbarn		492	Kilkenny	Gowran	Famma	Thomastown
Brownsford		871	Kilkenny	Ida	Dysartmoon	New Ross
Brownstown		105	Kilkenny	Knocktopher	Aghaviller	Carrick on Suir
Brownstown		209	Kilkenny	Shillelogher	Castleinch or Inchyolaghan	Kilkenny
Brownstown		83	Kilkenny	Crannagh	Clashacrow	Kilkenny
Brownstown		655	Kilkenny	Ida	Dysartmoon	New Ross
Brownstown		110	Kilkenny	Ida	Listerlin	New Ross
Brownstown		537	Kilkenny	Gowran	St. John's	Kilkenny
Bruckana		77	Kilkenny	Galmoy	Erke	Urlingford
Bullockhill		196	Kilkenny	Fassadinin	Kilmademoge	Kilkenny
Burnchurch		588	Kilkenny	Shillelogher	Burnchurch	Callan
Burnchurch Viper		227	Kilkenny	Shillelogher	Burnchurch	Callan
Burntfurze		32	Kilkenny	Crannagh	St. Canice	Kilkenny
Burrellspark		24	Kilkenny	Gowran	Thomastown	Thomastown
Busherstown		344	Kilkenny	Ida	Ballygurrim	New Ross
Bushtameen		26	Kilkenny	Kells	Kilree	Callan
Butlersgrove		207	Kilkenny	Gowran	Kilmacahill	Kilkenny
Butlerswood		470	Kilkenny	Kells	Killamery	Callan
Byrnesgrove		725	Kilkenny	Fassadinin	Kilmacar	Castlecomer

== C ==
Townland	Other Names	Acres	County	Barony	Civil parish	Poor law union
CALLAN T.		xx	Kilkenny	Callan	Callan	Callan
CASTLECOMER T.		xx	Kilkenny	Fassadinin	Castlecomer	Castlecomer
CLOGH T.		xx	Kilkenny	Fassadinin	Castlecomer	Castlecomer
Caherlesk		1,162	Kilkenny	Kells	Ballytobin	Callan
Callan North		21	Kilkenny	Callan	Callan	Callan
Callan South		96	Kilkenny	Callan	Callan	Callan
Cannafahy		31	Kilkenny	Callan	Callan	Callan
Canvarstown		373	Kilkenny	Crannagh	Tullaroan	Kilkenny
Cappafaulish		87	Kilkenny	Shillelogher	Tullaghanbrogue	Callan
Cappagh		128	Kilkenny	Ida	Gaulskill	Waterford
Cappagh		730	Kilkenny	Gowran	Inistioge	Thomastown
Cappagh		516	Kilkenny	Knocktopher	Jerpointchurch	Thomastown
Cappagh		161	Kilkenny	Ida	Kilcoan	Waterford
Cappagh		140	Kilkenny	Crannagh	St. Canice	Kilkenny
Cappahayden		589	Kilkenny	Shillelogher	Killaloe	Callan
Cappahenry		12	Kilkenny	Callan	Callan	Callan
Cappahenry East		49	Kilkenny	Callan	Callan	Callan
Cappalauna		21	Kilkenny	Kells	Mallardstown	Callan
Cappass		56	Kilkenny	Callan	Callan	Callan
Carran		289	Kilkenny	Gowran	Dunbell	Kilkenny
Carran		179	Kilkenny	Gowran	Tullaherin	Thomastown
Carranroe Lower		144	Kilkenny	Ida	The Rower	New Ross
Carranroe Upper		281	Kilkenny	Ida	The Rower	New Ross
Carrickanoran		214	Kilkenny	Ida	The Rower	Thomastown
Carrickcloney		500	Kilkenny	Ida	Kilmakevoge	Waterford
Carrickinnane		65	Kilkenny	Ida	Rossinan	Waterford
Carrickmerlin		85	Kilkenny	Knocktopher	Aghaviller	Thomastown
Carrickmourne		300	Kilkenny	Gowran	Columbkille	Thomastown
Carrickshock Commons		47	Kilkenny	Knocktopher	Knocktopher	Thomastown
Carriganurra		393	Kilkenny	Ida	Kilcolumb	Waterford
Carrigatna		338	Kilkenny	Kells	Kilmaganny	Callan
Carrigeen		107	Kilkenny	Knocktopher	Jerpointchurch	Thomastown
Carrigeen		46	Kilkenny	Knocktopher	Knocktopher	Thomastown
Carrigeen		450	Kilkenny	Crannagh	Odagh	Kilkenny
Carrigeen		518	Kilkenny	Gowran	Rathcoole	Kilkenny
Cashel		227	Kilkenny	Iverk	Clonmore	Carrick on Suir
Cashel		39	Kilkenny	Shillelogher	St. Canice	Kilkenny
Cashel	Tobernafauna	79	Kilkenny	Iverk	Fiddown	Carrick on Suir
Cassagh		245	Kilkenny	Gowran	Mothell	Kilkenny
Castle Ellis		195	Kilkenny	Gowran	Gowran	Kilkenny
Castle Eve		548	Kilkenny	Shillelogher	Earlstown	Callan
Castlebanny		2,071	Kilkenny	Knocktopher	Derrynahinch	Thomastown
Castleblunden		190	Kilkenny	Shillelogher	St. Patrick's	Kilkenny
Castlecolumb		364	Kilkenny	Knocktopher	Knocktopher	Thomastown
Castlecomer		81	Kilkenny	Fassadinin	Castlecomer	Castlecomer
Castlecosker		509	Kilkenny	Gowran	Jerpoint West	Thomastown
Castlefield		196	Kilkenny	Gowran	Tullaherin	Thomastown
Castlegannon		972	Kilkenny	Knocktopher	Derrynahinch	Thomastown
Castlegarden		1,018	Kilkenny	Gowran	Kilfane	Thomastown
Castleinch	Inchyolaghan	447	Kilkenny	Shillelogher	Castleinch or Inchyolaghan	Kilkenny
Castlekelly		511	Kilkenny	Gowran	Kilmacahill	Kilkenny
Castlemarket		665	Kilkenny	Fassadinin	Rosconnell	Castlecomer
Castlemarket East		59	Kilkenny	Fassadinin	Attanagh	Castlecomer
Castlemarket West		9	Kilkenny	Fassadinin	Attanagh	Castlecomer
Castlemorris		513	Kilkenny	Knocktopher	Aghaviller	Thomastown
Castletobin		85	Kilkenny	Callan	Callan	Callan
Castletobin East		11	Kilkenny	Callan	Callan	Callan
Castletobin West		67	Kilkenny	Callan	Callan	Callan
Castletown		860	Kilkenny	Galmoy	Erke	Urlingford
Castletown		987	Kilkenny	Iverk	Whitechurch	Carrick on Suir
Castlewarren		1,046	Kilkenny	Gowran	Tiscoffin	Kilkenny
Catsrock		117	Kilkenny	Ida	Kilcolumb	Waterford
Catstown		536	Kilkenny	Knocktopher	Aghaviller	Thomastown
Cellarstown East		167	Kilkenny	Gowran	St. John's	Kilkenny
Cellarstown Lower		100	Kilkenny	Gowran	St. John's	Kilkenny
Cellarstown Upper		87	Kilkenny	Gowran	St. John's	Kilkenny
Cellarstown West		299	Kilkenny	Gowran	St. John's	Kilkenny
Charlestown		278	Kilkenny	Ida	Dunkitt	Waterford
Charterschoolland		34	Kilkenny	Gowran	St. John's	Kilkenny
Chatsworth	Aughatubbrid	1,651	Kilkenny	Fassadinin	Castlecomer	Castlecomer
Cherrymount		54	Kilkenny	Shillelogher	Stonecarthy	Thomastown
Church Hill		262	Kilkenny	Shillelogher	Grange	Kilkenny
Churchclara		335	Kilkenny	Gowran	Clara	Kilkenny
Clara Upper		559	Kilkenny	Gowran	Clara	Kilkenny
Clarabricken		567	Kilkenny	Gowran	Clara	Kilkenny
Clashacollare		84	Kilkenny	Callan	Callan	Callan
Clashacrow		560	Kilkenny	Crannagh	Clashacrow	Kilkenny
Clasharoe		56	Kilkenny	Iverk	Portnascully	Waterford
Clashavaha		148	Kilkenny	Kells	Coolaghmore	Callan
Clashduff		263	Kilkenny	Fassadinin	Dysart	Castlecomer
Clashduff Lower		39	Kilkenny	Fassadinin	Kilmacar	Castlecomer
Clashduff Upper		188	Kilkenny	Fassadinin	Kilmacar	Castlecomer
Clashmagrath		143	Kilkenny	Gowran	Gowran	Kilkenny
Clashwilliam		220	Kilkenny	Gowran	Dunbell	Kilkenny
Clashwilliam		282	Kilkenny	Gowran	Gowran	Kilkenny
Clashwilliam Upper		292	Kilkenny	Gowran	Gowran	Kilkenny
Clifden	Rathgarvan	484	Kilkenny	Gowran	Clara	Kilkenny
Clifden Commons		114	Kilkenny	Gowran	Gowran	Kilkenny
Clincaun		42	Kilkenny	Kells	Kilmaganny	Callan
Clintstown		447	Kilkenny	Fassadinin	Coolcraheen	Kilkenny
Clintstown		232	Kilkenny	Crannagh	Freshford	Kilkenny
Clogaralt		96	Kilkenny	Ida	The Rower	Thomastown
Clogga		1,067	Kilkenny	Iverk	Pollrone	Carrick on Suir
Clogh		506	Kilkenny	Fassadinin	Castlecomer	Castlecomer
Cloghabrody		375	Kilkenny	Gowran	Thomastown	Thomastown
Cloghala		577	Kilkenny	Gowran	Dungarvan	Thomastown
Clogharinka		580	Kilkenny	Fassadinin	Muckalee	Castlecomer
Cloghasty North		137	Kilkenny	Gowran	Ullard	Thomastown
Cloghasty South		49	Kilkenny	Gowran	Ullard	Thomastown
Cloghoge		280	Kilkenny	Crannagh	Ballycallan	Kilkenny
Cloghpook		453	Kilkenny	Gowran	Kilmadum	Kilkenny
Cloghscregg		1,032	Kilkenny	Gowran	Kilfane	Thomastown
Clohoge		44	Kilkenny	Gowran	Clara	Kilkenny
Clomantagh (Mt. Garret)		981	Kilkenny	Crannagh	Clomantagh	Urlingford
Clomantagh Lower		544	Kilkenny	Crannagh	Clomantagh	Urlingford
Clomantagh Upper		209	Kilkenny	Crannagh	Clomantagh	Urlingford
Clonamery		554	Kilkenny	Ida	Clonamery	Thomastown
Clonard		69	Kilkenny	Crannagh	Ballycallan	Kilkenny
Clonassy		720	Kilkenny	Iverk	Kilmacow	Waterford
Clonassy		341	Kilkenny	Iverk	Rathkieran	Waterford
Clonconey		406	Kilkenny	Iverk	Clonmore	Carrick on Suir
Clone		374	Kilkenny	Kells	Kilmaganny	Callan
Clone		452	Kilkenny	Galmoy	Rathbeagh	Urlingford
Cloneen		800	Kilkenny	Fassadinin	Castlecomer	Castlecomer
Clonmoran		127	Kilkenny	Shillelogher	St. Patrick's	Kilkenny
Clonmore	Clonmaccormick	923	Kilkenny	Iverk	Clonmore	Carrick on Suir
Clontubbrid		386	Kilkenny	Crannagh	Sheffin	Urlingford
Clonygarra		120	Kilkenny	Kells	Coolaghmore	Callan
Cloone		171	Kilkenny	Ida	Dunkitt	Waterford
Cloranshea		353	Kilkenny	Crannagh	St. Canice	Kilkenny
Clover		231	Kilkenny	Gowran	Gowran	Kilkenny
Clumbkille		989	Kilkenny	Gowran	Columbkille	Thomastown
Coalsfarm		264	Kilkenny	Shillelogher	Burnchurch	Callan
Coan East		1,720	Kilkenny	Fassadinin	Dysart	Castlecomer
Coan West		1,496	Kilkenny	Fassadinin	Dysart	Castlecomer
Coldharbour		222	Kilkenny	Crannagh	Killahy	Urlingford
Collegepark		9	Kilkenny	Kilkenny, Muni. Borough of	St. John's	Kilkenny
Colpitparks		123	Kilkenny	Knocktopher	Aghaviller	Thomastown
Com		106	Kilkenny	Gowran	Kilfane	Thomastown
Commoge		13	Kilkenny	Callan	Callan	Callan
Common		4	Kilkenny	Knocktopher	Knocktopher	Thomastown
Commons		116	Kilkenny	Gowran	Gowran	Kilkenny
Commons		50	Kilkenny	Fassadinin	Kilmacar	Castlecomer
Commons North		72	Kilkenny	Gowran	Gowran	Kilkenny
Commons South		9	Kilkenny	Gowran	Gowran	Kilkenny
Condonstown		322	Kilkenny	Knocktopher	Aghaviller	Thomastown
Coneygar		235	Kilkenny	Gowran	Clara	Kilkenny
Connahy		1,519	Kilkenny	Fassadinin	Grangemaccomb	Castlecomer
Coolaghflags		106	Kilkenny	Kells	Coolaghmore	Callan
Coolaghmore		430	Kilkenny	Kells	Coolaghmore	Callan
Coolalong		79	Kilkenny	Callan	Callan	Callan
Coolanimod North		164	Kilkenny	Knocktopher	Kilbeacon	Waterford
Coolanimod South		113	Kilkenny	Knocktopher	Kilbeacon	Waterford
Coolapogue		135	Kilkenny	Shillelogher	Tullaghanbrogue	Callan
Coolatogher		275	Kilkenny	Gowran	Powerstown	Thomastown
Coolbaun		683	Kilkenny	Fassadinin	Castlecomer	Castlecomer
Coolbricken		119	Kilkenny	Gowran	Rathcoole	Kilkenny
Coolcashin		348	Kilkenny	Galmoy	Coolcashin	Urlingford
Coolcullen		3,234	Kilkenny	Fassadinin	Mothell	Castlecomer
Coolcuttia		286	Kilkenny	Gowran	Shankill	Kilkenny
Coole		203	Kilkenny	Fassadinin	Donaghmore	Castlecomer
Coole		137	Kilkenny	Ida	The Rower	New Ross
Cooleen		317	Kilkenny	Ida	Dysartmoon	New Ross
Coolehill Lower		175	Kilkenny	Kells	Killamery	Callan
Coolehill Upper		402	Kilkenny	Kells	Killamery	Callan
Cooleshal		145	Kilkenny	Crannagh	Killaloe	Callan
Cooleshal Beg		97	Kilkenny	Crannagh	Odagh	Kilkenny
Cooleshal More		182	Kilkenny	Crannagh	Odagh	Kilkenny
Coolfarnamanagh		87	Kilkenny	Gowran	Graiguenamanagh	Thomastown
Coolgrange		159	Kilkenny	Crannagh	St. Canice	Kilkenny
Coolgrange		263	Kilkenny	Gowran	Tiscoffin	Kilkenny
Coolgreany		366	Kilkenny	Gowran	Tiscoffin	Kilkenny
Coolhill		439	Kilkenny	Ida	The Rower	Thomastown
Coolierin		127	Kilkenny	Gowran	Graiguenamanagh	Thomastown
Coolmarks		200	Kilkenny	Gowran	Tiscoffin	Kilkenny
Coolmeen		617	Kilkenny	Knocktopher	Derrynahinch	Thomastown
Coolmore		299	Kilkenny	Knocktopher	Knocktopher	Thomastown
Coolnabrone		103	Kilkenny	Shillelogher	Tullaghanbrogue	Callan
Coolnabrone		163	Kilkenny	Gowran	Powerstown	Thomastown
Coolnacoppogue	Coolnambrisklaun	130	Kilkenny	Fassadinin	Kilmacar	Castlecomer
Coolnacrutta		888	Kilkenny	Galmoy	Glashare	Urlingford
Coolnahau		522	Kilkenny	Knocktopher	Jerpoint West	New Ross
Coolnaleen		430	Kilkenny	Fassadinin	Castlecomer	Castlecomer
Coolnambrisklaun	Coolnacoppogue	130	Kilkenny	Fassadinin	Kilmacar	Castlecomer
Coolnamuck		493	Kilkenny	Ida	Clonamery	Thomastown
Coolnapisha		38	Kilkenny	Crannagh	Tullaroan	Kilkenny
Coologe		146	Kilkenny	Kells	Coolaghmore	Callan
Cooloultha	Moneynamuck	465	Kilkenny	Galmoy	Erke	Urlingford
Coolraheen		188	Kilkenny	Fassadinin	Muckalee	Castlecomer
Coolraheen North		472	Kilkenny	Fassadinin	Mothel	Castlecomer
Coolraheen South		660	Kilkenny	Fassadinin	Mothel	Castlecomer
Coolrainy		347	Kilkenny	Gowran	Inistioge	Thomastown
Coolrainy		172	Kilkenny	Ida	The Rower	Thomastown
Coolroe		428	Kilkenny	Gowran	Inistioge	Thomastown
Coolroe		910	Kilkenny	Gowran	Graiguenamanagh	Thomastown
Coolroebeg		320	Kilkenny	Knocktopher	Jerpointchurch	Thomastown
Coolsillagh		55	Kilkenny	Gowran	Inistioge	Thomastown
Coontraght		23	Kilkenny	Shillelogher	Tullaghanbrogue	Callan
Coorleagh		351	Kilkenny	Gowran	Shankill	Kilkenny
Coppanagh		1,347	Kilkenny	Gowran	Graiguenamanagh	Kilkenny
Corbally		824	Kilkenny	Iverk	Fiddown	Carrick on Suir
Corbally		61	Kilkenny	Callan	Callan	Callan
Corbetstown		502	Kilkenny	Fassadinin	Mothell	Castlecomer
Corloughan		356	Kilkenny	Iverk	Fiddown	Carrick on Suir
Corluddy		331	Kilkenny	Iverk	Portnascully	Waterford
Cornyeal		12	Kilkenny	Callan	Callan	Callan
Corragaun (Morris)		144	Kilkenny	Kells	Tullahought	Carrick on Suir
Corragaun (Reade)		63	Kilkenny	Kells	Tullahought	Carrick on Suir
Corstown		312	Kilkenny	Crannagh	Ballycallan	Kilkenny
Cotterellsbooly		210	Kilkenny	Knocktopher	Stonecarthy	Thomastown
Cotterellsbooly		781	Kilkenny	Knocktopher	Jerpointchurch	Thomastown
Cotterellsrath		421	Kilkenny	Shillelogher	Kells	Callan
Cottrellstown		129	Kilkenny	Kells	Kilmaganny	Callan
Courstown		429	Kilkenny	Crannagh	Tullaroan	Kilkenny
Courtnaboghilla		425	Kilkenny	Gowran	Powerstown	Thomastown
Courtnabooly		121	Kilkenny	Kells	Mallardstown	Callan
Courtnabooly East		220	Kilkenny	Kells	Coolaghmore	Callan
Courtnabooly West		227	Kilkenny	Kells	Coolaghmore	Callan
Cox's Fields		12	Kilkenny	Shillelogher	St. Patrick's	Kilkenny
Craddockstown		249	Kilkenny	Crannagh	Tubbridbritain	Urlingford
Craigue		233	Kilkenny	Iverk	Whitechurch	Carrick on Suir
Cramersgrove	Grove	356	Kilkenny	Gowran	Kilkieran	Kilkenny
Creenkill Beg		113	Kilkenny	Galmoy	Balleen	Urlingford
Creenkill More		250	Kilkenny	Galmoy	Balleen	Urlingford
Croan		277	Kilkenny	Knocktopher	Aghaviller	Thomastown
Croan		410	Kilkenny	Shillelogher	Danesfort	Thomastown
Croghtabeg	Bunbury	181	Kilkenny	Kells	Ballytobin	Callan
Croghtabeg	Courtown	189	Kilkenny	Kells	Ballytobin	Callan
Croghtenclogh		3,470	Kilkenny	Fassadinin	Castlecomer	Castlecomer
Crokershill		25	Kilkenny	Crannagh	St. Canice	Kilkenny
Croneenlaun		61	Kilkenny	Kells	Kilmaganny	Callan
Cronoge		16	Kilkenny	Shillelogher	Earlstown	Callan
Crossoge		3	Kilkenny	Callan	Callan	Callan
Crosspatrick		616	Kilkenny	Galmoy	Erke	Urlingford
Crossybrennan		25	Kilkenny	Fassadinin	Muckalee	Castlecomer
Crowbally		520	Kilkenny	Knocktopher	Derrynahinch	Thomastown
Crowbally		144	Kilkenny	Gowran	Tullaherin	Thomastown
Crowhill		216	Kilkenny	Crannagh	Freshford	Kilkenny
Cruan		224	Kilkenny	Kells	Coolaghmore	Callan
Crutt		2,456	Kilkenny	Fassadinin	Castlecomer	Castlecomer
Cullaun		486	Kilkenny	Ida	The Rower	Thomastown
Cullentragh		565	Kilkenny	Ida	The Rower	Thomastown
Curkacrone		45	Kilkenny	Callan	Callan	Callan
Curragh		188	Kilkenny	Crannagh	Ballycallan	Kilkenny
Curragh		60	Kilkenny	Kells	Coolaghmore	Callan
Curraghbehy		298	Kilkenny	Knocktopher	Killahy	Waterford
Curraghduff		77	Kilkenny	Crannagh	Freshford	Kilkenny
Curraghkehoe		261	Kilkenny	Crannagh	Ballycallan	Kilkenny
Curraghlane		343	Kilkenny	Ida	Dysartmoon	New Ross
Curraghlane Lower		306	Kilkenny	Gowran	Powerstown	Thomastown
Curraghlane Upper		262	Kilkenny	Gowran	Powerstown	Thomastown
Curraghmartin		153	Kilkenny	Iverk	Aglish	Waterford
Curraghmore		576	Kilkenny	Iverk	Owning	Carrick on Suir
Curraghmore		239	Kilkenny	Ida	Kilcolumb	Waterford
Curraghmore		467	Kilkenny	Ida	Jerpoint West	New Ross
Curraghnadimpaun		168	Kilkenny	Kells	Tullahought	Carrick on Suir
Curraghscarteen		116	Kilkenny	Crannagh	Tullaroan	Kilkenny
Currahill Lower		234	Kilkenny	Kells	Kilmaganny	Callan
Currahill Upper		250	Kilkenny	Kells	Kilmaganny	Callan
Cussan		288	Kilkenny	Kells	Tullahought	Callan
Cussana		124	Kilkenny	Iverk	Portnascully	Waterford
Cussana		58	Kilkenny	Iverk	Aglish	Waterford

== D ==
Townland	Other Names	Acres	County	Barony	Civil parish	Poor law union
DOONANE T.		xx	Kilkenny	Iverk	Pollrone	Waterford
DUNBELL T.		xx	Kilkenny	Gowran	Dunbell	Kilkenny
Dungarvan T.		xx	Kilkenny	Gowran	Dungarvan	Thomastown
DUNNAMAGGIN T.		xx	Kilkenny	Kells	Dunnamaggin	Callan
Dairyhill		98	Kilkenny	Shillelogher	Killaloe	Callan
Damerstown East		532	Kilkenny	Fassadinin	Dysart	Castlecomer
Damerstown West		338	Kilkenny	Fassadinin	Dysart	Castlecomer
Damma Lower		589	Kilkenny	Crannagh	Ballycallan	Kilkenny
Damma Upper		164	Kilkenny	Crannagh	Ballycallan	Kilkenny
Danesfort		771	Kilkenny	Shillelogher	Danesfort	Thomastown
Danesrath		335	Kilkenny	Knocktopher	Knocktopher	Thomastown
Dangan		409	Kilkenny	Gowran	Columbkille	Thomastown
Dangan		592	Kilkenny	Iverk	Kilmacow	Waterford
Danganbeg		370	Kilkenny	Kells	Kilree	Callan
Danganmore		375	Kilkenny	Kells	Dunnamaggin	Callan
Danville		143	Kilkenny	Shillelogher	St. Patrick's	Kilkenny
Darbyshill		76	Kilkenny	Crannagh	Clomantagh	Urlingford
Darbystown		273	Kilkenny	Knocktopher	Listerlin	New Ross
Davidstown		428	Kilkenny	Ida	Kilcolumb	Waterford
Deansground		35	Kilkenny	Kilkenny, Muni. Borough of	St. Patrick's	Kilkenny
Deerpark		530	Kilkenny	Crannagh	St. Canice	Kilkenny
Deerpark		229	Kilkenny	Gowran	Graiguenamanagh	Thomastown
Deerpark		198	Kilkenny	Knocktopher	Rossinan	Waterford
Deerpark		75	Kilkenny	Shillelogher	Killaloe	Callan
Derdimus		129	Kilkenny	Shillelogher	Inchyolaghan	Kilkenny
Derdimus		129	Kilkenny	Shillelogher	Castleinch or Inchyolaghan	Kilkenny
Derreen		205	Kilkenny	Shillelogher	Killaloe	Callan
Derrylacky		826	Kilkenny	Knocktopher	Derrynahinch	Thomastown
Derrynahinch		993	Kilkenny	Knocktopher	Derrynahinch	Thomastown
Desert Demesne		500	Kilkenny	Shillelogher	Tullaghanbrogue	Callan
Dicksborough		136	Kilkenny	Shillelogher	St. Patrick's	Kilkenny
Dirtystep		31	Kilkenny	Callan	Callan	Callan
Donaghmore		862	Kilkenny	Fassadinin	Donaghmore	Castlecomer
Donaghmore		53	Kilkenny	Shillelogher	St. Patrick's	Kilkenny
Donaghmore Lower		527	Kilkenny	Galmoy	Fertagh	Urlingford
Donaghmore Upper		148	Kilkenny	Galmoy	Fertagh	Urlingford
Donaguile		784	Kilkenny	Fassadinin	Castlecomer	Castlecomer
Doorath		494	Kilkenny	Crannagh	Ballycallan	Kilkenny
Doornane		417	Kilkenny	Iverk	Pollrone	Waterford
Dowling		440	Kilkenny	Iverk	Fiddown	Carrick on Suir
Drakeland Lower		104	Kilkenny	Shillelogher	St. Patrick's	Kilkenny
Drakeland Middle		230	Kilkenny	Shillelogher	St. Patrick's	Kilkenny
Drakeland Upper		40	Kilkenny	Shillelogher	St. Patrick's	Kilkenny
Dreelingstown		289	Kilkenny	Crannagh	Ballycallan	Kilkenny
Drimeen		59	Kilkenny	Callan	Callan	Callan
Drimeen North		26	Kilkenny	Callan	Callan	Callan
Drimeen South		5	Kilkenny	Callan	Callan	Callan
Drumdowney Lower		178	Kilkenny	Ida	Rathpatrick	Waterford
Drumdowney Upper		952	Kilkenny	Ida	Rathpatrick	Waterford
Drumerhin		387	Kilkenny	Fassadinin	Kilmadum	Kilkenny
Drumgoole		295	Kilkenny	Fassadinin	Castlecomer	Castlecomer
Dukesmeadows		37	Kilkenny	Shillelogher	St. Patrick's	Kilkenny
Dukesmeadows		69	Kilkenny	Shillelogher	St. John's	Kilkenny
Dukesmeadows		8	Kilkenny	Shillelogher	St. Canice	Kilkenny
Dunbell Big		1,298	Kilkenny	Gowran	Dunbell	Kilkenny
Dunbell Little		36	Kilkenny	Gowran	Dunbell	Kilkenny
Dundaryark		548	Kilkenny	Shillelogher	Danesfort	Thomastown
Dungarvan		41	Kilkenny	Gowran	Tullaherin	Thomastown
Dungarvan		464	Kilkenny	Gowran	Dungarvan	Thomastown
Dungarvan Glebe		48	Kilkenny	Gowran	Dungarvan	Thomastown
Dungooly		352	Kilkenny	Iverk	Rathkieran	Waterford
Duninga		1,255	Kilkenny	Gowran	Grangesilvia	Kilkenny
Dunkitt		530	Kilkenny	Ida	Dunkitt	Waterford
Dunmore		242	Kilkenny	Fassadinin	Dunmore	Kilkenny
Dunmore		105	Kilkenny	Gowran	St. John's	Kilkenny
Dunmore East		479	Kilkenny	Fassadinin	Dunmore	Kilkenny
Dunmore Park		399	Kilkenny	Fassadinin	Dunmore	Kilkenny
Dunmore West		825	Kilkenny	Fassadinin	Dunmore	Kilkenny
Dunmorepark		111	Kilkenny	Gowran	St. John's	Kilkenny
Dunnamaggin East		212	Kilkenny	Kells	Dunnamaggin	Callan
Dunnamaggin West		293	Kilkenny	Kells	Dunnamaggin	Callan
Dunningstown		467	Kilkenny	Crannagh	St. Canice	Kilkenny
Dysart		239	Kilkenny	Gowran	Pleberstown	Thomastown
Dysart Glebe		144	Kilkenny	Fassadinin	Dysart	Castlecomer

== E ==
Townland	Other Names	Acres	County	Barony	Civil parish	Poor law union
Eagles Hill		67	Kilkenny	Gowran	Clara	Kilkenny
Earlsbog		195	Kilkenny	Crannagh	Odagh	Kilkenny
Earlsbog Common		77	Kilkenny	Gowran	Gowran	Kilkenny
Earlsgarden		208	Kilkenny	Fassadinin	Attanagh	Castlecomer
Earlsgarden		47	Kilkenny	Fassadinin	Rosconnell	Castlecomer
Earlsgrove		108	Kilkenny	Knocktopher	Knocktopher	Thomastown
Earlsland		61	Kilkenny	Callan	Callan	Callan
Earlsquarter		126	Kilkenny	Gowran	Tullaherin	Thomastown
Earlsrath		144	Kilkenny	Knocktopher	Kilbeacon	Waterford
Ennisnag		1,240	Kilkenny	Shillelogher	Ennisnag	Thomastown
Esker		451	Kilkenny	Fassadinin	Mothell	Castlecomer

== F ==
Townland	Other Names	Acres	County	Barony	Civil parish	Poor law union
FIDDOWN T		xx	Kilkenny	Iverk	Fiddown	Carrick on Suir
FRESHFORD T.		xx	Kilkenny	Crannagh	Freshford	Kilkenny
Fahy	Fahee	355	Kilkenny	Ida	Gaulskill	Waterford
Fanningstown		421	Kilkenny	Iverk	Owning	Carrick on Suir
Farmley		255	Kilkenny	Shillelogher	Burnchurch	Callan
Farnoge		117	Kilkenny	Ida	Dunkitt	Waterford
Farnoge East		210	Kilkenny	Ida	Rossinan	Waterford
Farnoge West		621	Kilkenny	Ida	Rossinan	Waterford
Farranaree		73	Kilkenny	Kells	Killamery	Callan
Farranmacedmond		140	Kilkenny	Iverk	Rathkieran	Waterford
Farrantemple		151	Kilkenny	Ida	The Rower	New Ross
Feathallagh		295	Kilkenny	Gowran	Kilderry	Kilkenny
Fiddaun Lower		127	Kilkenny	Gowran	Inistioge	Thomastown
Fiddaun Upper		257	Kilkenny	Gowran	Inistioge	Thomastown
Fiddown		466	Kilkenny	Iverk	Fiddown	Carrick on Suir
Fiddown Island		40	Kilkenny	Iverk	Fiddown	Carrick on Suir
Filbuckstown		159	Kilkenny	Iverk	Rathkieran	Waterford
Finnan		567	Kilkenny	Fassadinin	Donaghmore	Castlecomer
Firgrove		157	Kilkenny	Gowran	Inistioge	Thomastown
Firoda Lower	Glenmagoo	1,049	Kilkenny	Fassadinin	Castlecomer	Castlecomer
Firoda Upper		1,184	Kilkenny	Fassadinin	Castlecomer	Castlecomer
Fishersgraigue		64	Kilkenny	Gowran	Graiguenamanagh	Thomastown
Flagmount		418	Kilkenny	Gowran	Gowran	Kilkenny
Flagmount South		24	Kilkenny	Gowran	Gowran	Kilkenny
Flemingstown		156	Kilkenny	Iverk	Kilmacow	Waterford
Flemingstown		195	Kilkenny	Ida	Kilcoan	Waterford
Floodhall	Rathtooterny	394	Kilkenny	Knocktopher	Jerpointchurch	Thomastown
Forekill		167	Kilkenny	Crannagh	Clomantagh	Urlingford
Forestalstown		318	Kilkenny	Ida	Ballygurrim	New Ross
Foulkscourt		113	Kilkenny	Galmoy	Erke	Urlingford
Foulkscourt		868	Kilkenny	Galmoy	Fertagh	Urlingford
Foulksrath		355	Kilkenny	Fassadinin	Coolcraheen	Kilkenny
Foulksrath		162	Kilkenny	Callan	Callan	Callan
Foulkstown		131	Kilkenny	Shillelogher	Outrath	Kilkenny
Foxcover		237	Kilkenny	Shillelogher	Killaloe	Callan
Foylatalure		357	Kilkenny	Crannagh	Tullaroan	Kilkenny
Foyle North		117	Kilkenny	Galmoy	Balleen	Urlingford
Foyle South		351	Kilkenny	Galmoy	Balleen	Urlingford
Frankford	Ballykieran	457	Kilkenny	Galmoy	Balleen	Urlingford
Frankfort East		282	Kilkenny	Kells	Killamery	Callan
Frankfort West		278	Kilkenny	Kells	Killamery	Callan
Freynestown		876	Kilkenny	Gowran	Tiscoffin	Kilkenny
Freshford		97	Kilkenny	Crannagh	Freshford	Kilkenny
Freshford Lots		66	Kilkenny	Crannagh	Freshford	Kilkenny
Friarsinch		43	Kilkenny	Gowran and Muni. Borough	St. John's	Kilkenny
Furzehouse		296	Kilkenny	Shillelogher	Outrath	Kilkenny

== G ==
Townland	Other Names	Acres	County	Barony	Civil parish	Poor law union
GLENMORE T.		xx	Kilkenny	Ida	Kilmakevoge	Waterford
GLENMORE T.		xx	Kilkenny	Ida	Kilcoan	Waterford
Goresbridge T.		xx	Kilkenny	Gowran	Grangesilvia	Thomastown
Gowran T.		xx	Kilkenny	Gowran	Gowran	Kilkenny
Graiguenamanagh T.		xx	Kilkenny	Gowran	Graiguenamanagh	Thomastown
GRANGE T.		xx	Kilkenny	Iverk	Pollrone	Waterford
Gallowshill		86	Kilkenny	Shillelogher	St. Patrick's	Kilkenny
Gardens		30	Kilkenny	Kilkenny, Muni. Borough of	St. Patrick's	Kilkenny
Gardens		55	Kilkenny	Kilkenny, Muni. Borough of	St. John's	Kilkenny
Gardens		81	Kilkenny	Kilkenny, Muni. Borough of	St. Canice	Kilkenny
Garnagale		244	Kilkenny	Crannagh	Tubbridbritain	Urlingford
Garranamanagh		357	Kilkenny	Crannagh	Garranamanagh	Urlingford
Garranbehy Big		189	Kilkenny	Ida	Rosbercon	New Ross
Garranbehy Little		24	Kilkenny	Ida	Rosbercon	New Ross
Garranconnell		155	Kilkenny	Crannagh	Tubbridbritain	Urlingford
Garrandarragh		376	Kilkenny	Knocktopher	Kilbeacon	Waterford
Garrandarragh		699	Kilkenny	Ida	Jerpoint West	New Ross
Garranhalloo		194	Kilkenny	Kells	Tullahought	Callan
Garranmachenry		433	Kilkenny	Kells	Killamery	Callan
Garrannaguilly		386	Kilkenny	Fassadinin	Donaghmore	Castlecomer
Garranrobin		116	Kilkenny	Kells	Kilmaganny	Callan
Garranstan		211	Kilkenny	Kells	Kells	Callan
Garranvabby		151	Kilkenny	Ida	The Rower	New Ross
Garraun		165	Kilkenny	Kells	Coolaghmore	Callan
Garraun		181	Kilkenny	Shillelogher	Castleinch or Inchyolaghan	Kilkenny
Garrincreen		116	Kilkenny	Gowran	St. John's	Kilkenny
Garrydague		157	Kilkenny	Galmoy	Coolcashin	Urlingford
Garryduff		866	Kilkenny	Gowran	Kilmacahill	Kilkenny
Garryduff		515	Kilkenny	Iverk	Owning	Carrick on Suir
Garrygaug		495	Kilkenny	Iverk	Muckalee	Carrick on Suir
Garryhiggin		132	Kilkenny	Crannagh	Tubbridbritain	Urlingford
Garrylaun		245	Kilkenny	Galmoy	Erke	Urlingford
Garryleesha		60	Kilkenny	Gowran	Powerstown	Thomastown
Garrynamann Lower		189	Kilkenny	Kells	Kells	Callan
Garrynamann Upper		345	Kilkenny	Kells	Kells	Callan
Garrynarea		510	Kilkenny	Iverk	Owning	Carrick on Suir
Garryrickin		1,067	Kilkenny	Kells	Killamery	Callan
Garrythomas		151	Kilkenny	Kells	Killamery	Callan
Gaulstown		251	Kilkenny	Ida	Gaulskill	Waterford
Gaulstown		485	Kilkenny	Fassadinin	Muckalee	Castlecomer
Gaulstown		143	Kilkenny	Ida	Kilcolumb	Waterford
Gaulstown Lower		330	Kilkenny	Crannagh	Ballinamara	Kilkenny
Gaulstown Upper		373	Kilkenny	Crannagh	Ballinamara	Kilkenny
Glashare		872	Kilkenny	Galmoy	Glashare	Urlingford
Glebe		51	Kilkenny	Shillelogher	Castleinch or Inchyolaghan	Kilkenny
Glebe		19	Kilkenny	Fassadinin	Castlecomer	Castlecomer
Glebe		27	Kilkenny	Galmoy	Fertagh	Urlingford
Glebe		24	Kilkenny	Knocktopher	Knocktopher	Thomastown
Glebe		75	Kilkenny	Gowran	Kilfane	Thomastown
Glebe		34	Kilkenny	Kells	Kells	Callan
Glen		71	Kilkenny	Kells	Kilmaganny	Callan
Glenballyvally		449	Kilkenny	Ida	Dysartmoon	New Ross
Glenbower		244	Kilkenny	Iverk	Fiddown	Carrick on Suir
Glencloghlea		128	Kilkenny	Ida	Shanbogh	New Ross
Glencommaun		227	Kilkenny	Kells	Tullahought	Carrick on Suir
Glencoum		604	Kilkenny	Gowran	Graiguenamanagh	Thomastown
Glendine		123	Kilkenny	Gowran and Muni. Borough	St. John's	Kilkenny
Glendonnell		358	Kilkenny	Knocktopher	Rossinan	Waterford
Glengrant		72	Kilkenny	Iverk	Portnascully	Waterford
Glenmagoo	Firoda Lower	1,049	Kilkenny	Fassadinin	Castlecomer	Castlecomer
Glenmore		160	Kilkenny	Knocktopher	Jerpointchurch	Thomastown
Glennafunshoge	Ashglen	68	Kilkenny	Gowran	Woolengrange	Thomastown
Glenpipe		1,157	Kilkenny	Knocktopher	Jerpoint West	New Ross
Glenreagh		157	Kilkenny	Crannagh	Tubbridbritain	Urlingford
Glensansaw		137	Kilkenny	Ida	Rosbercon	New Ross
Glentiroe		189	Kilkenny	Ida	Dysartmoon	New Ross
Glinn		77	Kilkenny	Ida	Rosbercon	New Ross
Goghala		35	Kilkenny	Gowran	Tullaherin	Thomastown
Goldenfield		224	Kilkenny	Crannagh	Ballycallan	Kilkenny
Goodwinsgarden		684	Kilkenny	Kells	Kells	Callan
Gorteen		421	Kilkenny	Gowran	Powerstown	Thomastown
Gorteen		682	Kilkenny	Fassadinin	Castlecomer	Castlecomer
Gorteenara		83	Kilkenny	Fassadinin	Kilmenan	Castlecomer
Gorteennalee		64	Kilkenny	Shillelogher	Killaloe	Callan
Gorteennamuck		513	Kilkenny	Galmoy	Coolcashin	Urlingford
Gorteens		1,002	Kilkenny	Ida	Rathpatrick	Waterford
Gorteenteen		198	Kilkenny	Crannagh	Ballycallan	Kilkenny
Gortnacurragh		15	Kilkenny	Shillelogher	Killaloe	Callan
Gortnagap		654	Kilkenny	Crannagh	Tullaroan	Kilkenny
Gortnaglogh		189	Kilkenny	Kells	Tullahought	Callan
Gortnasragh		19	Kilkenny	Callan	Killaloe	Callan
Gortphaudeen		11	Kilkenny	Kells	Coolaghmore	Callan
Gortrush		396	Kilkenny	Iverk	Fiddown	Carrick on Suir
Goslingstown		311	Kilkenny	Shillelogher	Castleinch or Inchyolaghan	Kilkenny
Gowran		259	Kilkenny	Gowran	Gowran	Kilkenny
Gowran Demesne		846	Kilkenny	Gowran	Gowran	Kilkenny
Gragara		594	Kilkenny	Fassadinin	Mayne	Kilkenny
Graigavine		268	Kilkenny	Iverk	Clonmore	Carrick on Suir
Graigue		338	Kilkenny	Kells	Coolaghmore	Callan
Graigue (Hartford)		160	Kilkenny	Crannagh	Kilmanagh	Callan
Graigue (Hayden)		243	Kilkenny	Crannagh	Kilmanagh	Callan
Graigue Lower		129	Kilkenny	Shillelogher	Burnchurch	Callan
Graigue Upper		241	Kilkenny	Shillelogher	Burnchurch	Callan
Graiguenakill		156	Kilkenny	Ida	Kilmakevoge	Waterford
Graiguenamanagh		356	Kilkenny	Gowran	Graiguenamanagh	Thomastown
Graigueooly		221	Kilkenny	Shillelogher	Killaloe	Callan
Graiguesmeadow		8	Kilkenny	Callan	Callan	Callan
Graigueswood		254	Kilkenny	Crannagh	Sheffin	Urlingford
Grange		414	Kilkenny	Ida	The Rower	New Ross
Grange		643	Kilkenny	Iverk	Pollrone	Waterford
Grange		674	Kilkenny	Fassadinin	Grangemaccomb	Urlingford
Grange		287	Kilkenny	Shillelogher	Grange	Kilkenny
Grange		25	Kilkenny	Shillelogher	Castleinch or Inchyolaghan	Kilkenny
Grange Lower		1,962	Kilkenny	Gowran	Grangesilvia	Thomastown
Grange Upper		864	Kilkenny	Gowran	Grangesilvia	Thomastown
Grangecuff		324	Kilkenny	Shillelogher	Grange	Kilkenny
Grangefertagh		920	Kilkenny	Galmoy	Fertagh	Urlingford
Grangehill		378	Kilkenny	Gowran	Tiscoffin	Kilkenny
Granny		1,137	Kilkenny	Iverk	Kilmacow	Waterford
Greatoak		197	Kilkenny	Shillelogher	Killaloe	Callan
Greatwood		218	Kilkenny	Shillelogher	Killaloe	Callan
Greenhill		258	Kilkenny	Crannagh	Killahy	Urlingford
Greenridge		163	Kilkenny	Gowran	St. John's	Kilkenny
Greenville		273	Kilkenny	Ida	Dunkitt	Waterford
Grenan		653	Kilkenny	Gowran	Thomastown	Thomastown
Grevine East		385	Kilkenny	Shillelogher	Outrath	Kilkenny
Grevine West		130	Kilkenny	Shillelogher	Outrath	Kilkenny
Griffinstown		250	Kilkenny	Gowran	Ullard	Thomastown
Grogan		407	Kilkenny	Ida	Kilcolumb	Waterford
Grove		101	Kilkenny	Gowran	Blanchvilleskill	Kilkenny
Grove		324	Kilkenny	Shillelogher	Tullaghanbrogue	Callan
Grove		169	Kilkenny	Gowran	Powerstown	Thomastown
Grove	Cramersgrove	356	Kilkenny	Gowran	Kilkieran	Kilkenny
Grovebeg		233	Kilkenny	Kells	Kilree	Callan
Guilkagh Beg		68	Kilkenny	Ida	Listerlin	New Ross
Guilkagh More		134	Kilkenny	Ida	Listerlin	New Ross

== H ==
Townland	Other Names	Acres	County	Barony	Civil parish	Poor law union
HUGGINSTOWN T.		xx	Kilkenny	Knocktopher	Aghaviller	Thomastown
Haggard		172	Kilkenny	Kells	Kilree	Callan
Haggard		543	Kilkenny	Ida	Kilmakevoge	Waterford
Haggartsgreen		109	Kilkenny	Callan	Callan	Callan
Harristown		630	Kilkenny	Knocktopher	Muckalee	Carrick on Suir
Hermitage		104	Kilkenny	Ida	The Rower	New Ross
Higginstown		629	Kilkenny	Gowran	Blackrath	Kilkenny
Highbays		10	Kilkenny	Kilkenny, Muni. Borough of	St. John's	Kilkenny
Highrath		51	Kilkenny	Gowran	St. Martin's	Kilkenny
Highrath		223	Kilkenny	Gowran	Blackrath	Kilkenny
Hillend		139	Kilkenny	Crannagh	Killahy	Urlingford
Holdensrath		320	Kilkenny	Shillelogher	St. Patrick's	Kilkenny
Holdenstown		276	Kilkenny	Gowran	Dunbell	Kilkenny
Hoodsgrove		295	Kilkenny	Ida	Rosbercon	New Ross
Hugginstown		327	Kilkenny	Knocktopher	Aghaviller	Thomastown
Huntingtown		287	Kilkenny	Gowran	Dungarvan	Thomastown
Huntstown		568	Kilkenny	Crannagh	Tullaroan	Kilkenny

== I ==
Townland	Other Names	Acres	County	Barony	Civil parish	Poor law union
INISTIOGE T.		xx	Kilkenny	Gowran	Inistioge	Thomastown
Inch More		352	Kilkenny	Crannagh	Coolcraheen	Kilkenny
Inchabride		40	Kilkenny	Fassadinin	Mothell	Castlecomer
Inchacarran		118	Kilkenny	Knocktopher	Killahy	Waterford
Inchakill Glebe		168	Kilkenny	Fassadinin	Mayne	Kilkenny
Inchanaglogh		133	Kilkenny	Kells	Tullahought	Callan
Inchbeg		252	Kilkenny	Crannagh	Coolcraheen	Kilkenny
Inchmore		21	Kilkenny	Crannagh	Freshford	Kilkenny
Inchyolaghan	Castleinch	447	Kilkenny	Shillelogher	Castleinch or Inchyolaghan	Kilkenny
Inistioge		1,739	Kilkenny	Gowran	Inistioge	Thomastown
Islands		1,719	Kilkenny	Galmoy	Urlingford	Urlingford
Islands		138	Kilkenny	Crannagh	Coolcraheen	Kilkenny

== J ==
Townland	Other Names	Acres	County	Barony	Civil parish	Poor law union
JOHNSTOWN T.		xx	Kilkenny	Galmoy	Fertagh	Urlingford
Jackstown		120	Kilkenny	Gowran	Columbkille	Thomastown
Jamesgreen		33	Kilkenny	Kilkenny, Muni. Borough of	St. Canice	Kilkenny
Jamespark		40	Kilkenny	Crannagh and Muni. Borough	St. Canice	Kilkenny
Jamestown		255	Kilkenny	Iverk	Fiddown	Carrick on Suir
Jamestown		294	Kilkenny	Ida	Ballygurrim	New Ross
Jenkinstown		610	Kilkenny	Fassadinin	Mayne	Kilkenny
Jerpoint West		399	Kilkenny	Gowran	Jerpoint West	Thomastown
Jerpointabbey		764	Kilkenny	Gowran	Jerpointabbey	Thomastown
Jerpointchurch		635	Kilkenny	Knocktopher	Jerpointchurch	Thomastown
Jerpointhill		518	Kilkenny	Knocktopher	Jerpointchurch	Thomastown
Jockeyhall		50	Kilkenny	Gowran	Jerpointabbey	Thomastown
Johnswell		445	Kilkenny	Gowran	Rathcoole	Kilkenny
Joinersfolly		116	Kilkenny	Shillelogher	St. Patrick's	Kilkenny
Jordanstown		95	Kilkenny	Gowran	Kilmacahill	Kilkenny
Jordanstown		52	Kilkenny	Gowran	Shankill	Kilkenny
Julianstown		97	Kilkenny	Fassadinin	Dysart	Castlecomer

== K ==
Townland	Other Names	Acres	County	Barony	Civil parish	Poor law union
KELLS T.		xx	Kilkenny	Kells	Kells	Callan
KILKENNY CITY		xx	Kilkenny	Kilkenny City	St. Canice	Kilkenny
KILKENNY CITY		xx	Kilkenny	Kilkenny City	St. Patrick's	Kilkenny
KILKENNY CITY		xx	Kilkenny	Kilkenny City	St. Maul's	Kilkenny
KILKENNY CITY		xx	Kilkenny	Kilkenny City	St. Martin's	Kilkenny
KILKENNY CITY		xx	Kilkenny	Kilkenny City	St. John's	Kilkenny
KILKENNY CITY		xx	Kilkenny	Kilkenny City	St. Mary's	Kilkenny
KILMACOW T.		xx	Kilkenny	Iverk	Kilmacow	Waterford
KILMAGANNY T.		xx	Kilkenny	Kells	Kilmaganny	Callan
KILMANAGH T.		xx	Kilkenny	Crannagh	Kilmanagh	Callan
KNOCKTOPHER T.		xx	Kilkenny	Knocktopher	Knocktopher	Thomastown
Kearneysbay		141	Kilkenny	Ida	Kilcolumb	Waterford
Keatingstown		733	Kilkenny	Crannagh	St. Canice	Kilkenny
Keatingstown		110	Kilkenny	Knocktopher	Lismateige	Thomastown
Kells		629	Kilkenny	Kells	Kells	Callan
Kellsborough		62	Kilkenny	Kells	Kells	Callan
Kellsgrange		478	Kilkenny	Kells	Kells	Callan
Kellymount		1,094	Kilkenny	Gowran	Shankill	Kilkenny
Kilballykeefe		158	Kilkenny	Crannagh	Ballycallan	Callan
Kilballykeefe		236	Kilkenny	Crannagh	Tullaghanbrogue	Callan
Kilbline		690	Kilkenny	Gowran	Tullaherin	Thomastown
Kilbraghan		411	Kilkenny	Crannagh	Kilmanagh	Callan
Kilbraghan		288	Kilkenny	Ida	Dysartmoon	New Ross
Kilbrickan		538	Kilkenny	Shillelogher	Earlstown	Callan
Kilbride		378	Kilkenny	Ida	Kilbride	Waterford
Kilbride		2	Kilkenny	Callan	Callan	Callan
Kilbride Glebe		39	Kilkenny	Callan	Callan	Callan
Kilcollan		408	Kilkenny	Fassadinin	Mothel	Castlecomer
Kilconnelly		177	Kilkenny	Ida	The Rower	Thomastown
Kilcraggan		369	Kilkenny	Iverk	Ballytarsney	Waterford
Kilcreen		118	Kilkenny	Shillelogher	St. Patrick's	Kilkenny
Kilcreen		42	Kilkenny	Crannagh and Muni. Borough	St. Canice	Kilkenny
Kilcross		894	Kilkenny	Gowran	Inistioge	Thomastown
Kilcullen		662	Kilkenny	Gowran	Columbkille	Thomastown
Kilcurl (Anglesey)		113	Kilkenny	Knocktopher	Knocktopher	Thomastown
Kilcurl (Feronsby)		141	Kilkenny	Knocktopher	Knocktopher	Thomastown
Kildalton		799	Kilkenny	Iverk	Fiddown	Carrick on Suir
Kilderry		419	Kilkenny	Gowran	Kilderry	Kilkenny
Kildrinagh		474	Kilkenny	Crannagh	Tubbridbritain	Urlingford
Kildrummy		325	Kilkenny	Kells	Kilmaganny	Callan
Kilfane Demesne		514	Kilkenny	Gowran	Kilfane	Thomastown
Kilfane East		95	Kilkenny	Gowran	Kilfane	Thomastown
Kilfane West		91	Kilkenny	Gowran	Kilfane	Thomastown
Kilferagh		365	Kilkenny	Shillelogher	Kilferagh	Kilkenny
Kiljames Lower		222	Kilkenny	Gowran	Columbkille	Thomastown
Kiljames Upper		248	Kilkenny	Gowran	Columbkille	Thomastown
Kilkeasy		1,508	Kilkenny	Knocktopher	Kilkeasy	Thomastown
Kilkieran		749	Kilkenny	Gowran	Kilkieran	Kilkenny
Kilkieran		313	Kilkenny	Gowran	Inistioge	Thomastown
Kill		331	Kilkenny	Fassadinin	Rathaspick	Castlecomer
Killahy		234	Kilkenny	Knocktopher	Killahy	Waterford
Killahy		464	Kilkenny	Crannagh	Killahy	Urlingford
Killaloe		299	Kilkenny	Shillelogher	Killaloe	Callan
Killamery		608	Kilkenny	Kells	Killamery	Callan
Killandrew		235	Kilkenny	Knocktopher	Rossinan	Waterford
Killaree		656	Kilkenny	Crannagh	Odagh	Kilkenny
Killarney		155	Kilkenny	Gowran	Killarney	Thomastown
Killaspy		478	Kilkenny	Ida	Dunkitt	Waterford
Killeen		244	Kilkenny	Gowran	Inistioge	Thomastown
Killeen		860	Kilkenny	Crannagh	Kilmanagh	Callan
Killeen		208	Kilkenny	Knocktopher	Killahy	Waterford
Killeen East		116	Kilkenny	Gowran	Ullard	Thomastown
Killeen West		292	Kilkenny	Gowran	Ullard	Thomastown
Killeens		78	Kilkenny	Ida	The Rower	Thomastown
Killinaspick		265	Kilkenny	Iverk	Clonmore	Carrick on Suir
Killindra		25	Kilkenny	Kells	Dunnamaggin	Callan
Killinny		380	Kilkenny	Kells	Kells	Callan
Killonerry		438	Kilkenny	Iverk	Whitechurch	Carrick on Suir
Killoshulan		1,182	Kilkenny	Crannagh	Fertagh	Urlingford
Killure	Bohernastrekaun	253	Kilkenny	Gowran	Wells	Kilkenny
Kilmacahill		269	Kilkenny	Gowran	Kilmacahill	Kilkenny
Kilmacar		813	Kilkenny	Fassadinin	Kilmacar	Castlecomer
Kilmacoliver		347	Kilkenny	Kells	Tullahought	Carrick on Suir
Kilmacow		246	Kilkenny	Iverk	Kilmacow	Waterford
Kilmacshane		705	Kilkenny	Gowran	Inistioge	Thomastown
Kilmademoge		195	Kilkenny	Fassadinin	Kilmademoge	Kilkenny
Kilmadum		358	Kilkenny	Fassadinin	Kilmadum	Kilkenny
Kilmaganny		273	Kilkenny	Kells	Kilmaganny	Callan
Kilmagar		615	Kilkenny	Gowran	Clara	Kilkenny
Kilmagar		342	Kilkenny	Gowran	Kilderry	Kilkenny
Kilmakevoge		210	Kilkenny	Ida	Kilmakevoge	Waterford
Kilmanagh		368	Kilkenny	Crannagh	Kilmanagh	Callan
Kilmanaheen		743	Kilkenny	Gowran	Dungarvan	Thomastown
Kilmanahin		237	Kilkenny	Iverk	Fiddown	Carrick on Suir
Kilminnick East		18	Kilkenny	Callan	Callan	Callan
Kilminnick West		66	Kilkenny	Callan	Callan	Callan
Kilmog	Racecourse	377	Kilkenny	Shillelogher	Grange	Kilkenny
Kilmogue		654	Kilkenny	Knocktopher	Fiddown	Carrick on Suir
Kilmurry		28	Kilkenny	Gowran	Kilfane	Thomastown
Kilmurry		1,239	Kilkenny	Ida	Rathpatrick	Waterford
Kilmurry		371	Kilkenny	Gowran	Columbkille	Thomastown
Kilree		785	Kilkenny	Shillelogher	Grangekilree	Kilkenny
Kilree		420	Kilkenny	Kells	Kilree	Callan
Kilrush		423	Kilkenny	Crannagh	Clomantagh	Urlingford
Kiltallaghan		178	Kilkenny	Kells	Killamery	Callan
Kiltorcan		976	Kilkenny	Knocktopher	Derrynahinch	Thomastown
Kiltown		730	Kilkenny	Fassadinin	Castlecomer	Castlecomer
Kiltown		350	Kilkenny	Ida	The Rower	New Ross
Kiltrassy		395	Kilkenny	Kells	Killamery	Callan
Kilvinoge		508	Kilkenny	Knocktopher	Jerpointchurch	Thomastown
Kingsland		88	Kilkenny	Gowran	Clara	Kilkenny
Kingsland		104	Kilkenny	Gowran	St. John's	Kilkenny
Kingsland East		161	Kilkenny	Crannagh	St. Canice	Kilkenny
Kingsland West		75	Kilkenny	Crannagh	St. Canice	Kilkenny
Kingsmountain	Mylerstown	390	Kilkenny	Knocktopher	Aghaviller	Thomastown
Kirwan's Inch		148	Kilkenny	Fassadinin	Dunmore	Kilkenny
Knickeen		142	Kilkenny	Kells	Tullahought	Carrick on Suir
Knockadrina		267	Kilkenny	Shillelogher	Stonecarthy	Thomastown
Knockanaddoge		1,163	Kilkenny	Fassadinin	Dysart	Castlecomer
Knockanore		195	Kilkenny	Gowran	Woolengrange	Thomastown
Knockanroe		59	Kilkenny	Gowran	Columbkille	Thomastown
Knockanroe North		119	Kilkenny	Gowran	Kilfane	Thomastown
Knockanroe South		24	Kilkenny	Gowran	Kilfane	Thomastown
Knockard		192	Kilkenny	Gowran	Jerpointabbey	Thomastown
Knockatore		279	Kilkenny	Ida	The Rower	New Ross
Knockavally		82	Kilkenny	Shillelogher	Tullaghanbrogue	Callan
Knockbarron North		54	Kilkenny	Gowran	Ullard	Thomastown
Knockbarron South		156	Kilkenny	Gowran	Ullard	Thomastown
Knockbodaly		161	Kilkenny	Gowran	Graiguenamanagh	Thomastown
Knockbrack		556	Kilkenny	Ida	Kilcolumb	Waterford
Knockbrack		42	Kilkenny	Gowran	Woolengrange	Thomastown
Knockbutton		58	Kilkenny	Kells	Coolaghmore	Callan
Knockdav		169	Kilkenny	Galmoy	Fertagh	Urlingford
Knockeenbaun		538	Kilkenny	Crannagh	Kilmanagh	Callan
Knockeenglass		282	Kilkenny	Crannagh	Kilmanagh	Callan
Knockglass		29	Kilkenny	Kells	Tullahought	Carrick on Suir
Knockgrace		69	Kilkenny	Crannagh	Odagh	Kilkenny
Knocklegan		60	Kilkenny	Shillelogher	Castleinch or Inchyolaghan	Kilkenny
Knockmajor		804	Kilkenny	Fassadinin	Muckalee	Castlecomer
Knockmore		208	Kilkenny	Knocktopher	Killahy	Waterford
Knockmoylan		128	Kilkenny	Knocktopher	Lismateige	Thomastown
Knockmoylan		1,382	Kilkenny	Knocktopher	Kilkeasy	Thomastown
Knocknabooly		133	Kilkenny	Knocktopher	Ennisnag	Thomastown
Knocknaguppoge		285	Kilkenny	Gowran	Rathcoole	Kilkenny
Knocknamuck		250	Kilkenny	Crannagh	Tullaroan	Kilkenny
Knocknew		504	Kilkenny	Fassadinin	Kilmademoge	Kilkenny
Knockown		96	Kilkenny	Crannagh	Freshford	Kilkenny
Knockreagh		363	Kilkenny	Shillelogher	Tullamaine	Callan
Knockroe		189	Kilkenny	Kells	Tullahought	Callan
Knockroe		83	Kilkenny	Crannagh	Ballinamara	Kilkenny
Knockroe		354	Kilkenny	Fassadinin	Rathbeagh	Castlecomer
Knockroe		165	Kilkenny	Kells	Kilmaganny	Callan
Knockshanbally		453	Kilkenny	Gowran	Kilmadum	Kilkenny
Knocktopher Commons		187	Kilkenny	Knocktopher	Knocktopher	Thomastown
Knocktopherabbey		228	Kilkenny	Knocktopher	Knocktopher	Thomastown
Knocktophermanor		257	Kilkenny	Knocktopher	Knocktopher	Thomastown
Knockwilliam		248	Kilkenny	Knocktopher	Derrynahinch	Thomastown
Kyle		177	Kilkenny	Kells	Kilmaganny	Callan
Kyle East		186	Kilkenny	Kells	Coolaghmore	Callan
Kyle West		223	Kilkenny	Kells	Coolaghmore	Callan
Kyleadohir		249	Kilkenny	Kells	Coolaghmore	Callan
Kyleandangan		95	Kilkenny	Shillelogher	Tullaghanbrogue	Callan
Kyleateera		197	Kilkenny	Kells	Mallardstown	Callan
Kyleballynamoe		595	Kilkenny	Crannagh	Tubbridbritain	Urlingford
Kyleballyoughter		295	Kilkenny	Crannagh	Tullaroan	Kilkenny
Kylebeg		211	Kilkenny	Shillelogher	St. Patrick's	Kilkenny
Kylebeg		157	Kilkenny	Gowran	Gowran	Kilkenny
Kylemore		311	Kilkenny	Ida	The Rower	New Ross
Kylenasaggart		61	Kilkenny	Crannagh	Ballycallan	Kilkenny
Kylenaskeagh		374	Kilkenny	Shillelogher	Killaloe	Callan
Kyleroe		170	Kilkenny	Gowran	St. John's	Kilkenny
Kyleva		225	Kilkenny	Knocktopher	Aghaviller	Thomastown
Kylevehagh Commons		83	Kilkenny	Callan	Callan	Callan

== L ==
Townland	Other Names	Acres	County	Barony	Civil parish	Poor law union
LICKETSTOWN T.		xx	Kilkenny	Iverk	Portnascully	Waterford
LISDOWNEY T.		xx	Kilkenny	Galmoy	Aharney	Urlingford
Lacken		24	Kilkenny	Gowran and Muni. Borough	St. John's	Kilkenny
Lacken		267	Kilkenny	Crannagh	St. Canice	Kilkenny
Lacken		102	Kilkenny	Gowran	Ullard	Thomastown
Lackendragaun		285	Kilkenny	Kells	Dunnamaggin	Callan
Laghtbrack		73	Kilkenny	Kells	Kells	Callan
Lakyle		58	Kilkenny	Shillelogher	Killaloe	Callan
Lamoge		468	Kilkenny	Kells	Tullahought	Callan
Lates		124	Kilkenny	Crannagh	Tullaroan	Kilkenny
Lawcus		261	Kilkenny	Shillelogher	Ennisnag	Thomastown
Lavistown		255	Kilkenny	Gowran	St. Martin's	Kilkenny
Leapstown		187	Kilkenny	Fassadinin	Kilmademoge	Kilkenny
Legan		241	Kilkenny	Gowran	Ballylinch	Thomastown
Leggetsrath East		215	Kilkenny	Gowran	St. John's	Kilkenny
Leggetsrath West		245	Kilkenny	Gowran and Muni. Borough	St. John's	Kilkenny
Lemonstown		382	Kilkenny	Kells	Kilmaganny	Callan
Lennaght		103	Kilkenny	Ida	The Rower	New Ross
Leugh		418	Kilkenny	Crannagh	Odagh	Kilkenny
Licketstown		342	Kilkenny	Iverk	Portnascully	Waterford
Lintaun		86	Kilkenny	Callan	Callan	Callan
Lisballyfroot		544	Kilkenny	Crannagh	Tullaroan	Kilkenny
Lisdowney		1,755	Kilkenny	Galmoy	Aharney	Urlingford
Lisduff		69	Kilkenny	Fassadinin	Grangemaccomb	Urlingford
Lismaine		316	Kilkenny	Fassadinin	Coolcraheen	Kilkenny
Lismateige		1,180	Kilkenny	Knocktopher	Lismateige	Thomastown
Lisnafunshin		425	Kilkenny	Fassadinin	Mothell	Castlecomer
Lisnalea		286	Kilkenny	Crannagh	Tullaroan	Kilkenny
Listerlin		1,407	Kilkenny	Ida	Listerlin	New Ross
Listrolin		699	Kilkenny	Iverk	Rathkieran	Carrick on Suir
Listrolin		489	Kilkenny	Iverk	Muckalee	Carrick on Suir
Littlefield		74	Kilkenny	Fassadinin	Mayne	Kilkenny
Loan		872	Kilkenny	Fassadinin	Castlecomer	Castlecomer
Lodge		311	Kilkenny	Galmoy	Balleen	Urlingford
Lodge Demesne East		146	Kilkenny	Crannagh	Sheffin	Urlingford
Lodge Demesne West		169	Kilkenny	Galmoy	Sheffin	Urlingford
Lough		293	Kilkenny	Galmoy	Erke	Urlingford
Loughbeg		30	Kilkenny	Kells	Dunnamaggin	Callan
Loughboreen		212	Kilkenny	Gowran	Tullaherin	Thomastown
Loughboy		109	Kilkenny	Shillelogher	St. Patrick's	Kilkenny
Loughill		48	Kilkenny	Fassadinin	Rosconnell	Castlecomer
Loughill		599	Kilkenny	Fassadinin	Attanagh	Castlecomer
Loughill		431	Kilkenny	Fassadinin	Abbeyleix	Castlecomer
Loughmacask		56	Kilkenny	Crannagh	St. Canice	Kilkenny
Loughmerans		369	Kilkenny	Gowran	St. John's	Kilkenny
Loughooly		23	Kilkenny	Callan	Callan	Callan
Loughsollish		239	Kilkenny	Kells	Dunnamaggin	Callan
Lousybush		107	Kilkenny	Crannagh	St. Canice	Kilkenny
Luffany		444	Kilkenny	Iverk	Portnascully	Waterford
Luffany		237	Kilkenny	Ida	Rathpatrick	Waterford
Lughinny		382	Kilkenny	Crannagh	Killahy	Urlingford
Lushkinnagh		160	Kilkenny	Crannagh	Odagh	Kilkenny
Lyons		40	Kilkenny	Kilkenny, Muni. Borough of	St. Canice	Kilkenny
Lyrath		128	Kilkenny	Gowran	Blackrath	Kilkenny
Lyrath		63	Kilkenny	Gowran	St. Martin's	Kilkenny
Lyrath		74	Kilkenny	Gowran	St. John's	Kilkenny

== M ==
Townland	Other Names	Acres	County	Barony	Civil parish	Poor law union
MOONCOIN T.		xx	Kilkenny	Iverk	Pollrone	Waterford
MULLINAVAT T.		xx	Kilkenny	Knocktopher	Kilbeacon	Waterford
Mabbotstown		93	Kilkenny	Knocktopher	Aghaviller	Thomastown
Maddockstown		593	Kilkenny	Gowran	Blackrath	Kilkenny
Maidenhall		160	Kilkenny	Shillelogher	Danesfort	Thomastown
Maidenhill		45	Kilkenny	Shillelogher and Muni. Borough	St. Canice	Kilkenny
Mallardstown		258	Kilkenny	Kells	Mallardstown	Callan
Mallardstown East		77	Kilkenny	Kells	Mallardstown	Callan
Mallardstown Great		316	Kilkenny	Kells	Mallardstown	Callan
Mallardstown Lower		245	Kilkenny	Kells	Mallardstown	Callan
Mallardstown Upper		207	Kilkenny	Kells	Mallardstown	Callan
Mallardstown West		86	Kilkenny	Kells	Mallardstown	Callan
Manselscourt		229	Kilkenny	Knocktopher	Kilbeacon	Waterford
Mantingstown		81	Kilkenny	Kells	Coolaghmore	Callan
Margaret's-fields		34	Kilkenny	Shillelogher	St. Patrick's	Kilkenny
Marnellsmeadows		19	Kilkenny	Shillelogher and Muni. Borough	St. Canice	Kilkenny
Maudlin		319	Kilkenny	Fassadinin	Kilmacar	Castlecomer
Maudlin		88	Kilkenny	Fassadinin	Mothell	Castlecomer
Maudlinsland		53	Kilkenny	Gowran	St. John's	Kilkenny
Maxtown		119	Kilkenny	Callan	Callan	Callan
Meallaghmore		209	Kilkenny	Kells	Tullahought	Callan
Meallaghmore Lower		175	Kilkenny	Kells	Killamery	Callan
Meallaghmore Upper		149	Kilkenny	Kells	Killamery	Callan
Melville		270	Kilkenny	Ida	Dunkitt	Waterford
Memory		43	Kilkenny	Kells	Kilmaganny	Callan
Michaelschurch		278	Kilkenny	Crannagh	Ballycallan	Kilkenny
Middleknock		55	Kilkenny	Gowran	St. John's	Kilkenny
Mill Island		24	Kilkenny	Kells	Mallardstown	Callan
Millbanks		198	Kilkenny	Ida	Rosbercon	New Ross
Milltown		939	Kilkenny	Knocktopher	Muckalee	Carrick on Suir
Milltown		507	Kilkenny	Ida	Dunkitt	Waterford
Milltown		195	Kilkenny	Ida	Ballygurrim	New Ross
Milltown		577	Kilkenny	Gowran	Ullard	Thomastown
Minnauns		197	Kilkenny	Callan	Callan	Callan
Moanamought Commons		53	Kilkenny	Callan	Callan	Callan
Moangarve		200	Kilkenny	Kells	Mallardstown	Callan
Moankeal Commons		44	Kilkenny	Callan	Callan	Callan
Moanmore		386	Kilkenny	Kells	Dunnamaggin	Callan
Moanmore Commons		281	Kilkenny	Callan	Callan	Callan
Moanroe		53	Kilkenny	Ida	Kilcolumb	Waterford
Moanroe Commons		68	Kilkenny	Knocktopher	Knocktopher	Thomastown
Moanteenmore		454	Kilkenny	Gowran	Dungarvan	Thomastown
Moat		140	Kilkenny	Crannagh	Freshford	Kilkenny
Moatpark		217	Kilkenny	Fassadinin	Donaghmore	Castlecomer
Mohil		294	Kilkenny	Fassadinin	Kilmademoge	Kilkenny
Molassy		169	Kilkenny	Callan	Callan	Callan
Molum		702	Kilkenny	Iverk	Ullid	Waterford
Monablanchameen		151	Kilkenny	Crannagh	Tubbridbritain	Urlingford
Monaboul		187	Kilkenny	Kells	Kilmaganny	Callan
Monabrika		150	Kilkenny	Crannagh	Freshford	Kilkenny
Monabrogue		236	Kilkenny	Crannagh	Ballylarkin	Kilkenny
Monachunna		107	Kilkenny	Kells	Dunnamaggin	Callan
Monadubbaun		155	Kilkenny	Kells	Dunnamaggin	Callan
Monafrica		41	Kilkenny	Crannagh	Odagh	Kilkenny
Monarche Commons		389	Kilkenny	Callan	Callan	Callan
Monassa		281	Kilkenny	Kells	Ballytobin	Callan
Monavadaroe		169	Kilkenny	Crannagh	Tullaroan	Kilkenny
Monavaddra		158	Kilkenny	Shillelogher	Tullaghanbrogue	Callan
Monavinnaun		156	Kilkenny	Iverk	Muckalee	Carrick on Suir
Monawinnia		32	Kilkenny	Kells	Mallardstown	Callan
Moneen		364	Kilkenny	Gowran	Graiguenamanagh	Thomastown
Moneenaun		148	Kilkenny	Galmoy	Rathbeagh	Urlingford
Moneenroe		1,303	Kilkenny	Fassadinin	Castlecomer	Castlecomer
Moneyhenry		121	Kilkenny	Knocktopher	Killahy	Waterford
Moneynamuck	Cooloultha	465	Kilkenny	Galmoy	Erke	Urlingford
Moneynamuck (Stopford)		491	Kilkenny	Galmoy	Erke	Urlingford
Monphole		68	Kilkenny	Galmoy	Sheffin	Urlingford
Monyheige Commons		30	Kilkenny	Knocktopher	Knocktopher	Thomastown
Mooncoin		43	Kilkenny	Iverk	Pollrone	Waterford
Moonhall		157	Kilkenny	Gowran	Tiscoffin	Kilkenny
Moonveen		326	Kilkenny	Iverk	Portnascully	Waterford
Mortgage Fields		48	Kilkenny	Shillelogher	St. Patrick's	Kilkenny
Mouler-town	Ballyvoulera	323	Kilkenny	Ida	Kilcoan	Waterford
Mountfinn		328	Kilkenny	Galmoy	Urlingford	Urlingford
Mountgale		456	Kilkenny	Crannagh	Ballycallan	Kilkenny
Mountjuliet	Walton's Grove	536	Kilkenny	Knocktopher	Jerpointchurch	Thomastown
Mountloftus		48	Kilkenny	Gowran	Powerstown	Thomastown
Mountneill		315	Kilkenny	Iverk	Aglish	Waterford
Mountnugent Lower		214	Kilkenny	Gowran	Rathcoole	Kilkenny
Mountnugent Upper		246	Kilkenny	Gowran	Rathcoole	Kilkenny
Moyhora		1,172	Kilkenny	Fassadinin	Castlecomer	Castlecomer
Moyne		141	Kilkenny	Fassadinin	Kilmacar	Castlecomer
Muck		157	Kilkenny	Crannagh	Tullaghanbrogue	Callan
Muckalee		1,123	Kilkenny	Fassadinin	Muckalee	Castlecomer
Muckmeadows		27	Kilkenny	Shillelogher	Tullaghanbrogue	Callan
Mullaunattina		257	Kilkenny	Galmoy	Urlingford	Urlingford
Mullaunglass		4	Kilkenny	Callan	Callan	Callan
Mullenbeg		743	Kilkenny	Iverk	Fiddown	Carrick on Suir
Mullennahone		295	Kilkenny	Ida	Kilmakevoge	Waterford
Mullennakill		849	Kilkenny	Knocktopher	Jerpoint West	New Ross
Mullinabro		207	Kilkenny	Ida	Dunkitt	Waterford
Mullinavat		32	Kilkenny	Knocktopher	Kilbeacon	Waterford
Mungan		302	Kilkenny	Ida	The Rower	New Ross
Mungmacody		552	Kilkenny	Gowran	Columbkille	Thomastown
Murtaghstown		153	Kilkenny	Ida	Rathpatrick	Waterford
Mylerstown	Kingsmountain	390	Kilkenny	Knocktopher	Aghaviller	Thomastown

== N ==
Townland	Other Names	Acres	County	Barony	Civil parish	Poor law union
Naglesland		63	Kilkenny	Crannagh	Odagh	Kilkenny
Narrabaun North		126	Kilkenny	Iverk	Kilmacow	Waterford
Narrabaun South		247	Kilkenny	Iverk	Kilmacow	Waterford
Neigham		470	Kilkenny	Gowran	Dungarvan	Thomastown
Newchurch		391	Kilkenny	Kells	Kilmaganny	Carrick on Suir
Newengland		308	Kilkenny	Crannagh	Tullaroan	Kilkenny
Newfarm		54	Kilkenny	Ida	The Rower	New Ross
Newgrove		409	Kilkenny	Ida	Dysartmoon	New Ross
Newhouse		598	Kilkenny	Gowran	Tullaherin	Thomastown
Newhouse		176	Kilkenny	Gowran	Gowran	Kilkenny
Newlands		148	Kilkenny	Shillelogher	Burnchurch	Callan
Newmarket		185	Kilkenny	Knocktopher	Aghaviller	Thomastown
Neworchard		208	Kilkenny	Gowran	St. John's	Kilkenny
Newpark		67	Kilkenny	Kells	Kilmaganny	Callan
Newpark Lower		151	Kilkenny	Gowran and Muni. Borough	St. Maul's	Kilkenny
Newpark Upper		160	Kilkenny	Gowran	St. Maul's	Kilkenny
Newtown		82	Kilkenny	Ida	Dunkitt	Waterford
Newtown		133	Kilkenny	Crannagh	Clomantagh	Urlingford
Newtown		134	Kilkenny	Gowran	St. John's	Kilkenny
Newtown		76	Kilkenny	Iverk	Kilmacow	Waterford
Newtown		328	Kilkenny	Crannagh	Kilcooly	Kilkenny
Newtown		291	Kilkenny	Fassadinin	Mothell	Castlecomer
Newtown		197	Kilkenny	Gowran	Graiguenamanagh	Thomastown
Newtown		189	Kilkenny	Kells	Dunnamaggin	Callan
Newtown		902	Kilkenny	Crannagh	St. Canice	Kilkenny
Newtown		500	Kilkenny	Gowran	Thomastown	Thomastown
Newtown (Baker)		647	Kilkenny	Shillelogher	Earlstown	Callan
Newtown (Shea)		577	Kilkenny	Shillelogher	Earlstown	Callan
Nicholastown		113	Kilkenny	Fassadinin	Kilmenan	Castlecomer
Nicholastown		623	Kilkenny	Ida	Kilcolumb	Waterford
Nicholastown		184	Kilkenny	Iverk	Pollrone	Carrick on Suir

== O ==
Townland	Other Names	Acres	County	Barony	Civil parish	Poor law union
Odagh		1	Kilkenny	Crannagh	Odagh	Kilkenny
Oldcastle Lower		172	Kilkenny	Kells	Killamery	Callan
Oldcastle Upper		195	Kilkenny	Kells	Killamery	Callan
Oldcourt		345	Kilkenny	Ida	Clonamery	Thomastown
Oldcourt		517	Kilkenny	Iverk	Fiddown	Carrick on Suir
Oldgrange		717	Kilkenny	Gowran	Graiguenamanagh	Thomastown
Oldpark		17	Kilkenny	Crannagh	St. Canice	Kilkenny
Oldtown		296	Kilkenny	Knocktopher	Jerpointchurch	Thomastown
Oldtown		390	Kilkenny	Shillelogher	Burnchurch	Callan
Oldtown		282	Kilkenny	Crannagh	Tullaroan	Kilkenny
Oldtown		556	Kilkenny	Fassadinin	Grangemaccomb	Castlecomer
Oldtownhill		403	Kilkenny	Crannagh	Tullaroan	Kilkenny
Ossoryhill		518	Kilkenny	Gowran	Kilderry	Kilkenny
Outrath		528	Kilkenny	Shillelogher	Outrath	Kilkenny
Ovenstown		610	Kilkenny	Shillelogher	Earlstown	Callan
Owning		799	Kilkenny	Iverk	Owning	Carrick on Suir

== P ==
Townland	Other Names	Acres	County	Barony	Civil parish	Poor law union
PAULSTOWN T.		xx	Kilkenny	Gowran	Kilmacahill	Kilkenny
PAULSTOWN T.		xx	Kilkenny	Gowran	Shankill	Kilkenny
PILLTOWN T.		xx	Kilkenny	Iverk	Fiddown	Carrick on Suir
POLLRONE T.		xx	Kilkenny	Iverk	Pollrone	Waterford
Paddock		60	Kilkenny	Shillelogher	Burnchurch	Callan
Palmerstown		57	Kilkenny	Shillelogher	St. Patrick's	Kilkenny
Palmerstown		162	Kilkenny	Crannagh	St. Canice	Kilkenny
Parkmore		160	Kilkenny	Shillelogher	Castleinch or Inchyolaghan	Kilkenny
Parks		86	Kilkenny	Crannagh	Tubbridbritain	Urlingford
Parksgrove		603	Kilkenny	Galmoy	Aharney	Urlingford
Parkstown Lower		187	Kilkenny	Ida	Kilmakevoge	Waterford
Parkstown Upper		169	Kilkenny	Ida	Kilmakevoge	Waterford
Paulstown		1,074	Kilkenny	Gowran	Kilmacahill	Kilkenny
Pawlerth		53	Kilkenny	Callan	Callan	Callan
Pennefatherslot		87	Kilkenny	Gowran and Muni. Borough	St. John's	Kilkenny
Physicianstown		286	Kilkenny	Kells	Coolaghmore	Callan
Picketstown		115	Kilkenny	Crannagh	Tullaroan	Kilkenny
Pigeonpark		260	Kilkenny	Shillelogher	Danesfort	Thomastown
Pleberstown		659	Kilkenny	Gowran	Pleberstown	Thomastown
Pollagh		597	Kilkenny	Crannagh	Kilmanagh	Callan
Pollagh		639	Kilkenny	Gowran	Powerstown	Thomastown
Pollagh		30	Kilkenny	Kells	Mallardstown	Callan
Pollagh		35	Kilkenny	Kells	Killamery	Callan
Pollrone		699	Kilkenny	Iverk	Pollrone	Waterford
Pollrone		253	Kilkenny	Kells	Tullahought	Carrick on Suir
Portnahully		288	Kilkenny	Iverk	Aglish	Waterford
Portnascully		131	Kilkenny	Iverk	Pollrone	Waterford
Portnascully		265	Kilkenny	Iverk	Portnascully	Waterford
Posey		48	Kilkenny	Gowran	Ullard	Thomastown
Pottlerath		1,016	Kilkenny	Crannagh	Kilmanagh	Callan
Poulanassy		1	Kilkenny	Iverk	Kilmacow	Waterford
Poulboy		80	Kilkenny	Kells	Kilmaganny	Callan
Poulgour		131	Kilkenny	Shillelogher	St. Patrick's	Kilkenny
Powerstown East		399	Kilkenny	Gowran	Powerstown	Thomastown
Powerstown West		15	Kilkenny	Gowran	Powerstown	Thomastown
Powerswood		665	Kilkenny	Gowran	Inistioge	Thomastown
Priestsvalley		82	Kilkenny	Gowran	Graiguenamanagh	Thomastown
Prologue		39	Kilkenny	Callan	Callan	Callan
Purcellsgarden		194	Kilkenny	Crannagh	Odagh	Kilkenny
Purcellsinch		177	Kilkenny	Gowran	St. John's	Kilkenny

== Q ==
Townland	Other Names	Acres	County	Barony	Civil parish	Poor law union
Quarryland		19	Kilkenny	Gowran	St. John's	Kilkenny

== R ==
Townland	Other Names	Acres	County	Barony	Civil parish	Poor law union
ROSBERCON T.		xx	Kilkenny	Ida	Rosbercon	New Ross
Racecourse	Kilmog	377	Kilkenny	Shillelogher	Grange	Kilkenny
Radestown North		584	Kilkenny	Gowran	St. John's	Kilkenny
Radestown South		168	Kilkenny	Gowran	St. John's	Kilkenny
Raggetsland		97	Kilkenny	Shillelogher	St. Patrick's	Kilkenny
Rahard		401	Kilkenny	Ida	Dunkitt	Waterford
Rahard East		26	Kilkenny	Ida	Rossinan	Waterford
Rahard West		254	Kilkenny	Ida	Rossinan	Waterford
Raheen		175	Kilkenny	Kells	Dunnamaggin	Callan
Raheen		269	Kilkenny	Ida	Rosbercon	New Ross
Raheen		584	Kilkenny	Iverk	Fiddown	Carrick on Suir
Raheen		382	Kilkenny	Crannagh	Tullaroan	Kilkenny
Raheenapisha		212	Kilkenny	Shillelogher	Castleinch or Inchyolaghan	Kilkenny
Raheenarran		409	Kilkenny	Kells	Kilmaganny	Carrick on Suir
Raheendonore		2,256	Kilkenny	Gowran	Graiguenamanagh	Thomastown
Raheenduff		223	Kilkenny	Ida	The Rower	New Ross
Raheenduff		219	Kilkenny	Shillelogher	Grange	Kilkenny
Raheennagun		46	Kilkenny	Crannagh	St. Canice	Kilkenny
Raheenroche		740	Kilkenny	Gowran	Dungarvan	Thomastown
Rahelty		298	Kilkenny	Crannagh	Ballinamara	Kilkenny
Rahillakeen		269	Kilkenny	Ida	Dunkitt	Waterford
Rahillakeen		122	Kilkenny	Ida	Rossinan	Waterford
Rahora		236	Kilkenny	Ida	Listerlin	New Ross
Rathaglish		44	Kilkenny	Ida	Kilcolumb	Waterford
Rathaleek		169	Kilkenny	Shillelogher	Castleinch or Inchyolaghan	Kilkenny
Rathbane		472	Kilkenny	Galmoy	Erke	Urlingford
Rathbeagh(or Castledough)		618	Kilkenny	Galmoy	Rathbeagh	Urlingford
Rathbourn	Ratheenmore	201	Kilkenny	Gowran	St. Martin's	Kilkenny
Rathcash		36	Kilkenny	Gowran	Blanchvilleskill	Kilkenny
Rathcash East		198	Kilkenny	Gowran	Tiscoffin	Kilkenny
Rathcash Little		11	Kilkenny	Gowran	Tiscoffin	Kilkenny
Rathcash West		1,149	Kilkenny	Gowran	Tiscoffin	Kilkenny
Rathclevin		137	Kilkenny	Crannagh	Tubbridbritain	Urlingford
Rathclogh		582	Kilkenny	Shillelogher	Danesfort	Thomastown
Rathcorrig	Rathcusack	170	Kilkenny	Gowran	Woolengrange	Thomastown
Rathculbin		646	Kilkenny	Kells	Mallardstown	Callan
Rathcurby North		124	Kilkenny	Iverk	Rathkieran	Waterford
Rathcurby South		277	Kilkenny	Iverk	Rathkieran	Waterford
Rathcusack	Rathcorrig	170	Kilkenny	Gowran	Woolengrange	Thomastown
Rathduff		373	Kilkenny	Gowran	Woolengrange	Thomastown
Rathduff		148	Kilkenny	Fassadinin	Donaghmore	Castlecomer
Rathduff		55	Kilkenny	Kells	Stonecarthy	Thomastown
Rathduff (Bayley)		75	Kilkenny	Kells	Kells	Callan
Rathduff (Madden)		99	Kilkenny	Kells	Kells	Callan
Rathduff Lower		92	Kilkenny	Kells	Kells	Callan
Rathduff Upper		304	Kilkenny	Kells	Kells	Callan
Rathealy		596	Kilkenny	Crannagh	Tullaroan	Kilkenny
Ratheenmore	Rathbourn	201	Kilkenny	Gowran	St. Martin's	Kilkenny
Rathgarry		249	Kilkenny	Fassadinin	Abbeyleix	Castlecomer
Rathgarvan	Clifden	484	Kilkenny	Gowran	Clara	Kilkenny
Rathinure		574	Kilkenny	Ida	Kilcolumb	Waterford
Rathkieran		319	Kilkenny	Iverk	Rathkieran	Waterford
Rathkyle		769	Kilkenny	Fassadinin	Kilmacar	Castlecomer
Rathleen		272	Kilkenny	Gowran	Inistioge	Thomastown
Rathlogan		484	Kilkenny	Galmoy	Rathlogan	Urlingford
Rathlogan		146	Kilkenny	Galmoy	Glashare	Urlingford
Rathmacan		656	Kilkenny	Crannagh	Tullaroan	Kilkenny
Rathmoyle		374	Kilkenny	Crannagh	Ballinamara	Kilkenny
Rathnasmolagh		337	Kilkenny	Ida	Dunkitt	Waterford
Rathoscar		90	Kilkenny	Galmoy	Fertagh	Urlingford
Rathosheen		132	Kilkenny	Galmoy	Erke	Urlingford
Rathpatrick		988	Kilkenny	Galmoy	Erke	Urlingford
Rathpatrick		365	Kilkenny	Ida	Rathpatrick	Waterford
Rathpoleen		269	Kilkenny	Galmoy	Erke	Urlingford
Rathreagh		621	Kilkenny	Galmoy	Erke	Urlingford
Rathsnagadan		246	Kilkenny	Ida	The Rower	New Ross
Rathtooterny	Floodhall	394	Kilkenny	Knocktopher	Jerpointchurch	Thomastown
Readesbarn		247	Kilkenny	Kells	Kilmaganny	Callan
Redacres North		2,239	Kilkenny	Knocktopher	Killahy	Waterford
Redacres South		116	Kilkenny	Knocktopher	Killahy	Waterford
Redbog		95	Kilkenny	Gowran	Kilmacahill	Kilkenny
Redbog		136	Kilkenny	Gowran	Gowran	Kilkenny
Redeen		69	Kilkenny	Crannagh	Ballycallan	Kilkenny
Redgap		33	Kilkenny	Ida	Kilcolumb	Waterford
Redhouse		232	Kilkenny	Shillelogher	Killaloe	Callan
Reevanagh		1,029	Kilkenny	Gowran	Tiscoffin	Kilkenny
Remeen		222	Kilkenny	Crannagh	Tullaroan	Kilkenny
Remeen		51	Kilkenny	Crannagh	Ballinamara	Kilkenny
Reviewfields		138	Kilkenny	Shillelogher	St. Patrick's	Kilkenny
Ricesland		65	Kilkenny	Knocktopher	Knocktopher	Thomastown
Rickardsland North		45	Kilkenny	Ida	Kilcoan	Waterford
Rickardsland South		42	Kilkenny	Ida	Kilcoan	Waterford
Ridge		184	Kilkenny	Galmoy	Borrismore	Urlingford
Riesk		86	Kilkenny	Shillelogher	Killaloe	Callan
Riesk		190	Kilkenny	Crannagh	Ballycallan	Kilkenny
Riesk		37	Kilkenny	Shillelogher	Tullaghanbrogue	Callan
Ringville		213	Kilkenny	Ida	Kilcolumb	Waterford
Ringwood		206	Kilkenny	Ida	The Rower	New Ross
Riversfield		69	Kilkenny	Callan	Callan	Callan
Roachpond		31	Kilkenny	Gowran and Muni. Borough	St. John's	Kilkenny
Robertshill		67	Kilkenny	Shillelogher and Muni. Borough	St. Canice	Kilkenny
Robinstown		323	Kilkenny	Ida	Kilmakevoge	Waterford
Rochestown		486	Kilkenny	Iverk	Rathkieran	Waterford
Rochestown		862	Kilkenny	Ida	Kilcolumb	Waterford
Rogerstown		296	Kilkenny	Kells	Kilmaganny	Callan
Rogerstown & Belline		648	Kilkenny	Iverk	Fiddown	Carrick on Suir
Rosbercon		110	Kilkenny	Ida	Rosbercon	New Ross
Roscon		283	Kilkenny	Kells	Killamery	Callan
Rossaneny (Morris)		187	Kilkenny	Kells	Killamery	Callan
Rossaneny (Reade)		510	Kilkenny	Kells	Killamery	Callan
Rossdama		246	Kilkenny	Shillelogher	Grange	Kilkenny
Rossenarra		146	Kilkenny	Kells	Kilmaganny	Callan
Rossenarra Demesne		953	Kilkenny	Kells	Kilmaganny	Callan
Rossinan		182	Kilkenny	Knocktopher	Rossinan	Waterford
Rossmore		421	Kilkenny	Shillelogher	Killaloe	Callan
Rossnanowl		119	Kilkenny	Ida	The Rower	New Ross
Rossroe		147	Kilkenny	Gowran	Inistioge	Thomastown
Roughfield		80	Kilkenny	Gowran	Blanchvilleskill	Kilkenny
Ruppa		268	Kilkenny	Gowran	Columbkille	Thomastown
Russellstown		331	Kilkenny	Fassadinin	Kilmenan	Castlecomer
Russellstown		198	Kilkenny	Ida	The Rower	New Ross
Ruthstown		157	Kilkenny	Fassadinin	Kilmadum	Kilkenny
Ruthstown		348	Kilkenny	Fassadinin	Kilmademoge	Kilkenny
Ryelanes		164	Kilkenny	Shillelogher	Tullaghanbrogue	Callan

== S ==
Townland	Other Names	Acres	County	Barony	Civil parish	Poor law union
STONYFORD T.		xx	Kilkenny	Knocktopher	Ennisnag	Thomastown
STONYFORD T.		xx	Kilkenny	Knocktopher	Stonecarthy	Thomastown
Sandfordscourt		596	Kilkenny	Gowran	Rathcoole	Kilkenny
Sandpits		158	Kilkenny	Iverk	Fiddown	Carrick on Suir
Sart		355	Kilkenny	Crannagh	Clashacrow	Kilkenny
Sart		379	Kilkenny	Crannagh	Ballinamara	Kilkenny
Scanlansland		171	Kilkenny	Fassadinin	Muckalee	Castlecomer
Scart		48	Kilkenny	Gowran	Clara	Kilkenny
Scart		48	Kilkenny	Gowran	Blackrath	Kilkenny
Scart		388	Kilkenny	Knocktopher	Rossinan	Waterford
Scart		481	Kilkenny	Gowran	Dungarvan	Thomastown
Scartnamoc		76	Kilkenny	Ida	Kilcolumb	Waterford
Scotsborough		303	Kilkenny	Shillelogher	Killaloe	Callan
Screhan		273	Kilkenny	Kells	Coolaghmore	Callan
Seixeslough		49	Kilkenny	Gowran and Muni. Borough	St. John's	Kilkenny
Seskin		480	Kilkenny	Galmoy	Aharney	Urlingford
Seskin		296	Kilkenny	Kells	Killamery	Callan
Seskin Little		36	Kilkenny	Galmoy	Aharney	Urlingford
Seskin North		402	Kilkenny	Galmoy	Aharney	Urlingford
Seskin South		342	Kilkenny	Galmoy	Aharney	Urlingford
Sevensisters		224	Kilkenny	Galmoy	Fertagh	Urlingford
Shanbogh Lower		328	Kilkenny	Ida	Shanbogh	New Ross
Shanbogh Upper		649	Kilkenny	Ida	Shanbogh	New Ross
Shancashlaun		25	Kilkenny	Kells	Kilmaganny	Callan
Shanganny		104	Kilkenny	Fassadinin	Mayne	Kilkenny
Shanganny		264	Kilkenny	Fassadinin	Grangemaccomb	Kilkenny
Shanganny		50	Kilkenny	Fassadinin	Coolcraheen	Kilkenny
Shankill		1,880	Kilkenny	Gowran	Shankill	Kilkenny
Sheafield North		138	Kilkenny	Gowran	Gowran	Kilkenny
Sheafield South		20	Kilkenny	Gowran	Gowran	Kilkenny
Sheastown		599	Kilkenny	Shillelogher	Kilferagh	Kilkenny
Sheepstown		572	Kilkenny	Knocktopher	Knocktopher	Thomastown
Sheeptown		28	Kilkenny	Crannagh	Tullaghanbrogue	Callan
Sheeptown		95	Kilkenny	Crannagh	Kilmanagh	Callan
Shellumsrath		128	Kilkenny	Shillelogher	St. Patrick's	Kilkenny
Sheskin Commons		7	Kilkenny	Callan	Callan	Callan
Shortallstown		304	Kilkenny	Kells	Kilree	Callan
Silverspring	Afaddy	77	Kilkenny	Iverk	Pollrone	Waterford
Silverspring	Afaddy	165	Kilkenny	Iverk	Ballytarsney	Waterford
Simonsland		86	Kilkenny	Crannagh	Odagh	Kilkenny
Sionhermitage		20	Kilkenny	Gowran	St. John's	Kilkenny
Skeaghacloran		204	Kilkenny	Callan	Callan	Callan
Skeaghaturrish		187	Kilkenny	Shillelogher	Danesfort	Thomastown
Skeaghcroum		70	Kilkenny	Crannagh	Tubbridbritain	Urlingford
Skeard		295	Kilkenny	Ida	Dunkitt	Waterford
Skehana		926	Kilkenny	Fassadinin	Castlecomer	Castlecomer
Skeaghvastheen				County Kilkenny		
Skinstown		176	Kilkenny	Galmoy	Rathbeagh	Urlingford
Slade		157	Kilkenny	Callan	Callan	Callan
Sleveen		133	Kilkenny	Fassadinin	Kilmacar	Castlecomer
Slievecarragh		262	Kilkenny	Ida	Dysartmoon	New Ross
Smartcastle East		76	Kilkenny	Ida	Dunkitt	Waterford
Smartcastle West		110	Kilkenny	Ida	Dunkitt	Waterford
Smithsland North		106	Kilkenny	Shillelogher	St. Patrick's	Kilkenny
Smithsland South		66	Kilkenny	Shillelogher	St. Patrick's	Kilkenny
Smithstown		9	Kilkenny	Gowran	Tullaherin	Thomastown
Smithstown		777	Kilkenny	Knocktopher	Listerlin	New Ross
Smithstown		689	Kilkenny	Fassadinin	Dysart	Castlecomer
Smithstown		375	Kilkenny	Gowran	Dunbell	Kilkenny
Smithstown		169	Kilkenny	Knocktopher	Kilbeacon	Waterford
Smithstown Lower		98	Kilkenny	Gowran	Thomastown	Thomastown
Smithstown Upper		358	Kilkenny	Gowran	Thomastown	Thomastown
Spahill		201	Kilkenny	Galmoy	Balleen	Urlingford
Springhill		156	Kilkenny	Fassadinin	Odagh	Kilkenny
Springhill		148	Kilkenny	Shillelogher	St. Patrick's	Kilkenny
Spruceshay		56	Kilkenny	Kells	Mallardstown	Callan
Sragh		287	Kilkenny	Crannagh	Tubbridbritain	Urlingford
Sraghgaddy		313	Kilkenny	Gowran	Kilmacahill	Kilkenny
Sraleagh		115	Kilkenny	Fassadinin	Donaghmore	Castlecomer
Srughawadda		137	Kilkenny	Kells	Kilmaganny	Callan
Stakally		356	Kilkenny	Gowran	Powerstown	Thomastown
Stampspark		16	Kilkenny	Gowran	Thomastown	Thomastown
Stangs		119	Kilkenny	Gowran	Gowran	Kilkenny
Stonecarthy East		317	Kilkenny	Shillelogher	Stonecarthy	Thomastown
Stonecarthy West		405	Kilkenny	Shillelogher	Stonecarthy	Thomastown
Stoneen		77	Kilkenny	Gowran	Kilfane	Thomastown
Strangsmill		10	Kilkenny	Ida	Dunkitt	Waterford
Stripes		55	Kilkenny	Ida	The Rower	New Ross
Stroan		208	Kilkenny	Gowran	Kilfane	Thomastown
Sugarloaf Hill		6	Kilkenny	Kilkenny, Muni. Borough of	St. Canice	Kilkenny
Sugarstown		263	Kilkenny	Gowran	Kilfane	Thomastown
Summerslane		115	Kilkenny	Kells	Coolaghmore	Callan
Sunhill		47	Kilkenny	Shillelogher	Burnchurch	Callan
Suttonsrath		223	Kilkenny	Fassadinin	Odagh	Kilkenny
Sweethill		259	Kilkenny	Galmoy	Rathbeagh	Urlingford
Swiftsheath		593	Kilkenny	Fassadinin	Coolcraheen	Kilkenny

== T ==
Townland	Other Names	Acres	County	Barony	Civil parish	Poor law union
THE ROWER T.		xx	Kilkenny	Ida	The Rower	New Ross
THOMASTOWN T.		xx	Kilkenny	Gowran	Thomastown	Thomastown
THOMASTOWN T.		xx	Kilkenny	Gowran	Columbkille	Thomastown
Talbotshill		207	Kilkenny	Gowran	Gowran	Kilkenny
Talbotsinch		303	Kilkenny	Crannagh and Muni. Borough	St. Canice	Kilkenny
Templemartin		210	Kilkenny	Gowran	St. Martin's	Kilkenny
Templemartin		28	Kilkenny	Gowran	St. John's	Kilkenny
Templemartin		82	Kilkenny	Gowran	Blackrath	Kilkenny
Templeorum		252	Kilkenny	Iverk	Fiddown	Carrick on Suir
Tentore		238	Kilkenny	Galmoy	Sheffin	Urlingford
Thomastown		16	Kilkenny	Gowran	Thomastown	Thomastown
Threecastles		457	Kilkenny	Crannagh	Odagh	Kilkenny
Threecastles Demesne		198	Kilkenny	Crannagh	Odagh	Kilkenny
Tibberaghny		1,147	Kilkenny	Iverk	Tibberaghny	Carrick on Suir
Tiermore		102	Kilkenny	Iverk	Ullid	Waterford
Tifeaghna (Browne)		110	Kilkenny	Galmoy	Sheffin	Urlingford
Tifeaghna (Mt. Garrett)		212	Kilkenny	Galmoy	Sheffin	Urlingford
Tikerlevan		831	Kilkenny	Gowran	Graiguenamanagh	Thomastown
Tinalintan		253	Kilkenny	Fassadinin	Kilmacar	Castlecomer
Tinaslatty		257	Kilkenny	Ida	The Rower	New Ross
Tincarraun		178	Kilkenny	Ida	The Rower	New Ross
Tincashel		329	Kilkenny	Galmoy	Urlingford	Urlingford
Tincouse		132	Kilkenny	Gowran	Powerstown	Thomastown
Tingarran		187	Kilkenny	Shillelogher	Killaloe	Callan
Tinnakeenly		188	Kilkenny	Gowran	Powerstown	Thomastown
Tinnakilly		262	Kilkenny	Iverk	Fiddown	Carrick on Suir
Tinnakilly		228	Kilkenny	Shillelogher	Killaloe	Callan
Tinnakilly Big		216	Kilkenny	Ida	Rosbercon	New Ross
Tinnakilly Little		17	Kilkenny	Ida	Rosbercon	New Ross
Tinnalintan		234	Kilkenny	Fassadinin	Donaghmore	Castlecomer
Tinnamoona		59	Kilkenny	Callan	Callan	Callan
Tinnapark		179	Kilkenny	Gowran	Graiguenamanagh	Thomastown
Tinnaranny		826	Kilkenny	Ida	Rosbercon	New Ross
Tinnascarty		112	Kilkenny	Galmoy	Sheffin	Urlingford
Tinnascolly		300	Kilkenny	Ida	The Rower	New Ross
Tinnaslatty		771	Kilkenny	Galmoy	Aharney	Urlingford
Tintine		265	Kilkenny	Ida	The Rower	New Ross
Tinvaucoosh		320	Kilkenny	Ida	Dunkitt	Waterford
Tinvaum		419	Kilkenny	Kells	Kilree	Callan
Tiroe		326	Kilkenny	Gowran	Ullard	Thomastown
Toberbreedia		201	Kilkenny	Crannagh	Ballycallan	Kilkenny
Tobernabrone		602	Kilkenny	Iverk	Fiddown	Carrick on Suir
Tobernafauna	Cashel	79	Kilkenny	Iverk	Fiddown	Carrick on Suir
Tobernapeastia		219	Kilkenny	Crannagh	Freshford	Kilkenny
Tomakeany		191	Kilkenny	Fassadinin	Kilmacar	Castlecomer
Tomascotha		35	Kilkenny	Fassadinin	Muckalee	Castlecomer
Tomnahaha		231	Kilkenny	Gowran	Powerstown	Thomastown
Toor Beg		287	Kilkenny	Fassadinin	Kilmacar	Castlecomer
Toor More		423	Kilkenny	Fassadinin	Kilmacar	Castlecomer
Toornamongan		79	Kilkenny	Galmoy	Erke	Urlingford
Toortane		308	Kilkenny	Fassadinin	Rathaspick	Castlecomer
Treanaree		252	Kilkenny	Ida	Kilcolumb	Waterford
Trenchardstown		429	Kilkenny	Crannagh	Tullaroan	Kilkenny
Trenchmore		422	Kilkenny	Kells	Coolaghmore	Callan
Troyswood		507	Kilkenny	Crannagh	St. Canice	Kilkenny
Tubbrid		344	Kilkenny	Iverk	Tubbrid	Carrick on Suir
Tubbrid Lower		475	Kilkenny	Crannagh	Tubbridbritain	Urlingford
Tubbrid Upper		497	Kilkenny	Crannagh	Tubbridbritain	Urlingford
Tuitestown		173	Kilkenny	Kells	Dunnamaggin	Thomastown
Tuitestown Little		61	Kilkenny	Kells	Dunnamaggin	Callan
Tullagher		367	Kilkenny	Ida	Dysartmoon	New Ross
Tullaherin		759	Kilkenny	Gowran	Tullaherin	Thomastown
Tullahought		211	Kilkenny	Kells	Tullahought	Carrick on Suir
Tullamaine (Ashbrook)		670	Kilkenny	Shillelogher	Tullamaine	Callan
Tullamaine (Flood)		138	Kilkenny	Shillelogher	Tullamaine	Callan
Tullanvoolty		435	Kilkenny	Galmoy	Erke	Urlingford
Tullaroan		443	Kilkenny	Crannagh	Tullaroan	Kilkenny
Tullowbrin		984	Kilkenny	Gowran	Rathcoole	Kilkenny
Tullowglass		286	Kilkenny	Fassadinin	Mayne	Kilkenny
Turkstown		260	Kilkenny	Iverk	Fiddown	Carrick on Suir

== U ==
Townland	Other Names	Acres	County	Barony	Civil parish	Poor law union
URLINGFORD T.		xx	Kilkenny	Galmoy	Urlingford	Urlingford
Ullard		637	Kilkenny	Gowran	Ullard	Thomastown
Ullid		579	Kilkenny	Iverk	Ullid	Waterford
Upperwood Demesne		283	Kilkenny	Crannagh	Freshford	Kilkenny
Urlingford		347	Kilkenny	Galmoy	Urlingford	Urlingford
Uskerty		1,222	Kilkenny	Fassadinin	Dysart	Castlecomer

== W ==
Townland	Other Names	Acres	County	Barony	Civil parish	Poor law union
WINDGAP T.		xx	Kilkenny	Kells	Killamery	Callan
Waddingstown		319	Kilkenny	Iverk	Rathkieran	Waterford
Walkinslough		71	Kilkenny	Kilkenny, Muni. Borough of	St. Canice	Kilkenny
Wallslough		262	Kilkenny	Shillelogher	Outrath	Kilkenny
Wallslough		205	Kilkenny	Shillelogher	Grangekilree	Kilkenny
Wallstown		393	Kilkenny	Crannagh	Ballinamara	Kilkenny
Walton's Grove	Mountjuliet	536	Kilkenny	Knocktopher	Jerpointchurch	Thomastown
Warrenstown		701	Kilkenny	Galmoy	Fertagh	Urlingford
Warrenstown		50	Kilkenny	Galmoy	Erke	Urlingford
Warrington		487	Kilkenny	Shillelogher	St. Patrick's	Kilkenny
Washer's Bog		26	Kilkenny	Shillelogher	Burnchurch	Callan
Waterland		75	Kilkenny	Galmoy	Erke	Urlingford
Watree		301	Kilkenny	Gowran	Gowran	Kilkenny
Weatherstown		495	Kilkenny	Ida	Kilcoan	Waterford
Webbsborough		274	Kilkenny	Fassadinin	Mothell	Castlecomer
Westcourt Commons		118	Kilkenny	Callan	Callan	Callan
Westcourt Demesne		140	Kilkenny	Callan	Callan	Callan
Westcourt North		406	Kilkenny	Callan	Callan	Callan
Westcourt South		19	Kilkenny	Callan	Callan	Callan
Westmoreland		145	Kilkenny	Knocktopher	Aghaviller	Thomastown
Wetland		65	Kilkenny	Shillelogher	St. Patrick's	Kilkenny
Whitecastle Lower		127	Kilkenny	Knocktopher	Knocktopher	Thomastown
Whitecastle Upper		27	Kilkenny	Knocktopher	Knocktopher	Thomastown
Whitechurch		273	Kilkenny	Iverk	Whitechurch	Carrick on Suir
Whitehouse		251	Kilkenny	Shillelogher	Killaloe	Callan
Whitesland		106	Kilkenny	Callan	Callan	Callan
Whiteswall		977	Kilkenny	Galmoy	Erke	Urlingford
Wildfield		200	Kilkenny	Gowran	Kilmadum	Castlecomer
Wildfield		290	Kilkenny	Fassadinin	Muckalee	Castlecomer
Woodlands		234	Kilkenny	Shillelogher	Castleinch or Inchyolaghan	Kilkenny
Woodlands		234	Kilkenny	Shillelogher	Inchyolaghan	Kilkenny
Woodquarter		63	Kilkenny	Gowran	Gowran	Kilkenny
Woodsgift		491	Kilkenny	Crannagh	Clomantagh	Urlingford
Woodville		118	Kilkenny	Gowran	Kilmacahill	Kilkenny
Woolengrange		729	Kilkenny	Gowran	Woolengrange	Thomastown

== V ==
Townland	Other Names	Acres	County	Barony	Civil parish	Poor law union
Vinesgrove		173	Kilkenny	Kells	Dunnamaggin	Callan
Viperkells		168	Kilkenny	Shillelogher	Kells	Callan
