= Grange Lower =

Grange Lower An Ghráinseach Íochtarach
- Townland
- Johnville Bridge, in Grange Lower townland, spans the Powerstown River

- Location in Ireland
- Coordinates: 52°37′09″N 7°0′42″W
- Country: Ireland
- Province: Leinster
- County: County Kilkenny
- Civil parish: Grangesilvia

Area
  - Total: 7.94 km^{2} (3.07 sq mi)
- Time zone: UTC+0 (WET)
  - Summer (DST): UTC-1 (IST (WEST))
- Irish grid reference: S669523

Grange Lower (Irish: An Ghráinseach Íochtarach) is a townland in the civil parish of Grangesilvia and the historical barony of Gowran in County Kilkenny, Ireland. It is near the village of Goresbridge. Jeanville, historically known as Johnville, was a former estate in the area. The townland of Grange Lower, which has an area of approximately 7.94 square kilometres (3.07 sq mi), had a population of 213 people as of the 2011 census.

== History ==
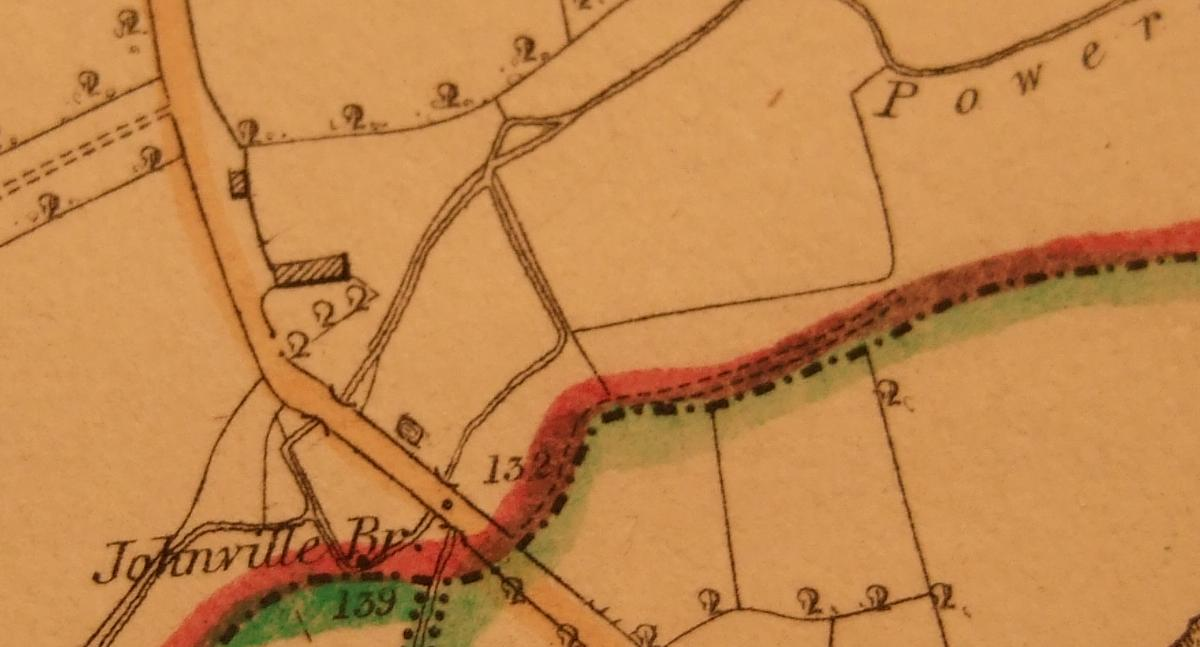
An 1842 OSI map of County Kilkenny (sheet 29) showing "Johnville Bridge" and the "Power[stown River]"

Evidence of ancient settlement in the townland of Grange Lower includes a cist grave which was discovered on a farm in Jeanville in 1960. Other sites, recorded in the Record of Monuments and Places, include a number of barrow, tower house (castle) and enclosure sites.

Johnville House, built in the area in 18th century, was occupied by the Davis family at the turn of the 19th century. The area near the house became known as Johnville, and gradually Jeanville, owing to a concentration of Huguenots in the area. Johnville Bridge, named as such on Ordnance Survey maps, spans the Powerstown River nearby.

== See also ==
- List of townlands in County Kilkenny
