= Hoodsgrove =

Townland in Rosbercon, County Kilkenny, Ireland

Coordinates: 52.4040°N 6.9920°W

Hoodsgrove (Irish: Garrán an Hudaigh) is a townland in the civil parish of Rosbercon, County Kilkenny, Ireland. It is approximately 295 acres (1.2 km^{2}) in area and bordered by Ballybeg to the east, Tinneranny to the north and Kilbrahan to the south. As of the 2011 census, Hoodsgrove had a population of 23 people. The "Mile Bush" is a local landmark, standing in a fork on the main New Ross to Mullinavat road.

== See also ==
- List of townlands in County Kilkenny
