= Rahelty, County Kilkenny =

Townland in County Kilkenny, Ireland

Coordinates: 52.678°N 7.357°W

Rahelty (Irish: Ráth-eilte) is a townland of 298 acres in the civil parish of Ballinamara in the barony of Cranagh in County Kilkenny, Ireland.

It is located a few miles to the north-west of Kilkenny City.
