= Columbkille, County Kilkenny =

Civil parish and townland in County Kilkenny, Ireland

Coordinates: 52.5313°N 7.1237°W

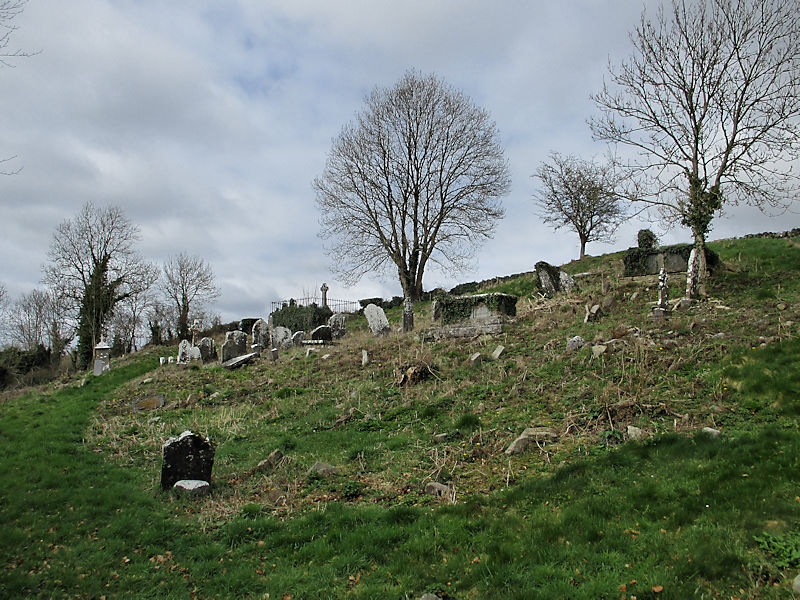
The old graveyard in Columbkille contains a number of 18th century graves and several recorded by the Commonwealth War Graves Commission

Columbkille (Irish: Cill Cholm Cille) is a civil parish and townland in County Kilkenny, Ireland. Located near Thomastown, it is in the historical barony of Gowran. Evidence of historical settlement in Columkille townland itself include a number of fulacht fiadh sites, a reputed holy well, and a graveyard and ruined church in an ecclesiastical enclosure. Other townlands within Columbkille civil parish include Ballyroe, Carrickmourne, Dangan, Jackstown, Kilcullen, Kiljames (Upper and Lower), Kilmurry, Ruppa and Mungmacody.
