= Iverk =

Barony in County Kilkenny, Ireland

Iverk Uíbh Eirc (Irish)
- Barony
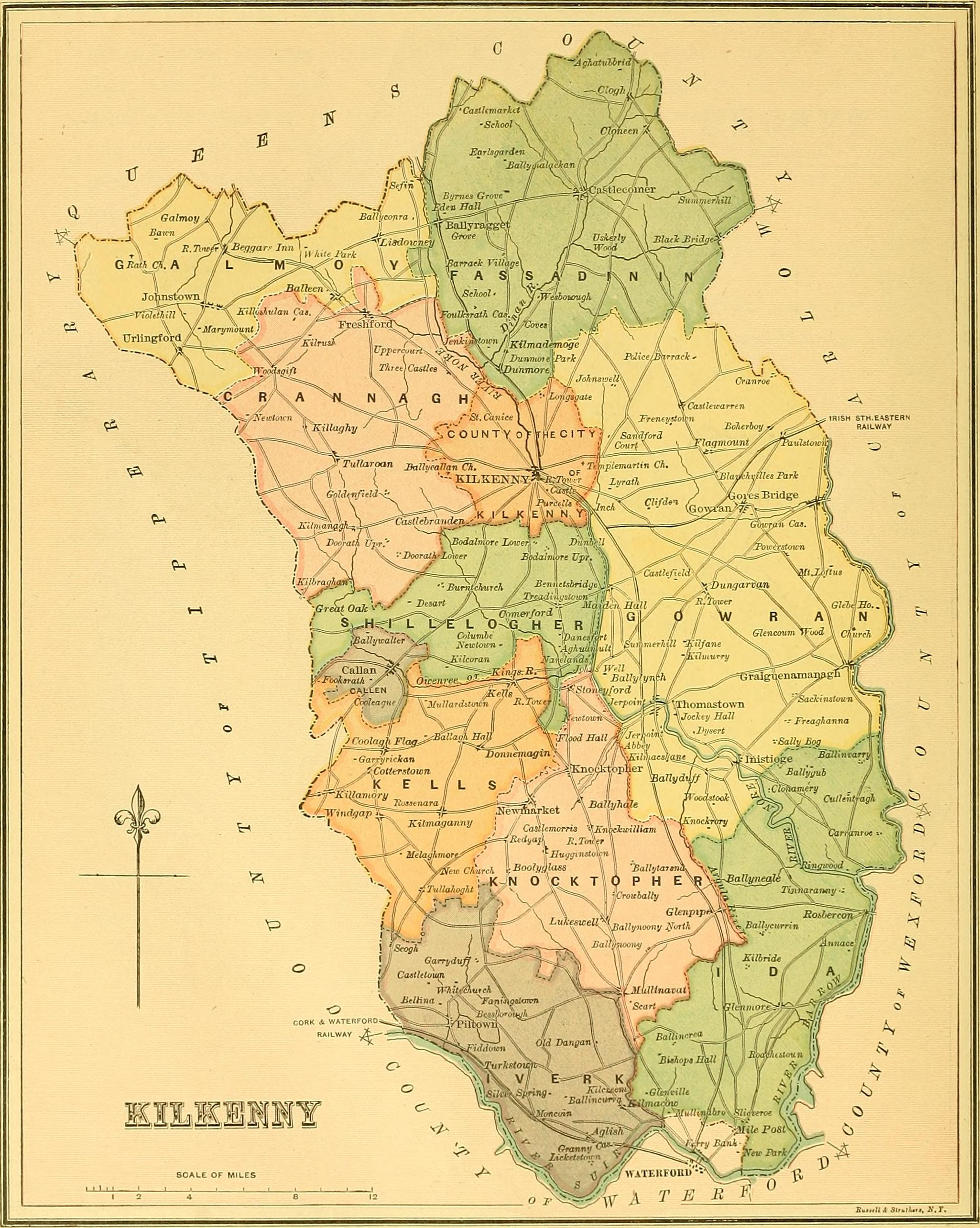
- Map of Iverk

- Location in Ireland
- Coordinates: 52.315°N 7.274°W
- Country: Ireland
- Province: Leinster
- County: County Kilkenny
- Civil parishes: List: Aglish; Arderra, Ballytarsney, Clonmore, Fiddown; Kilmacow; Muckalee; Pollrone, Portnascully; Rathkieran; Tibberaghny; Tubbrid; Ullid; Whitechurch

Area
  - Total: 167.3 km^{2} (64.6 sq mi)

Iverk (Irish: Uíbh Eirc) is a barony in the south-west of County Kilkenny, Ireland. The size of the barony is 167.3 square kilometres (64.6 sq mi). There are 15 civil parishes in Iverk. The chief town today is Piltown. The N24 crosses the barony.

Iverk lies at the south-west of the county, with the baronies of Kells and Knocktopher to the north (whose chief towns are Kells and Knocktopher), and the baronies of Ida and Kilculliheen to the east. County Waterford is located to the south of the boundary.

The barony was part of the historic kingdom of Osraige (Ossory). Today it is part of the Roman Catholic Church diocese of Ossory and the Church of Ireland diocese of Cashel and Ossory. Iverk is currently administered by Kilkenny County Council.

== History ==
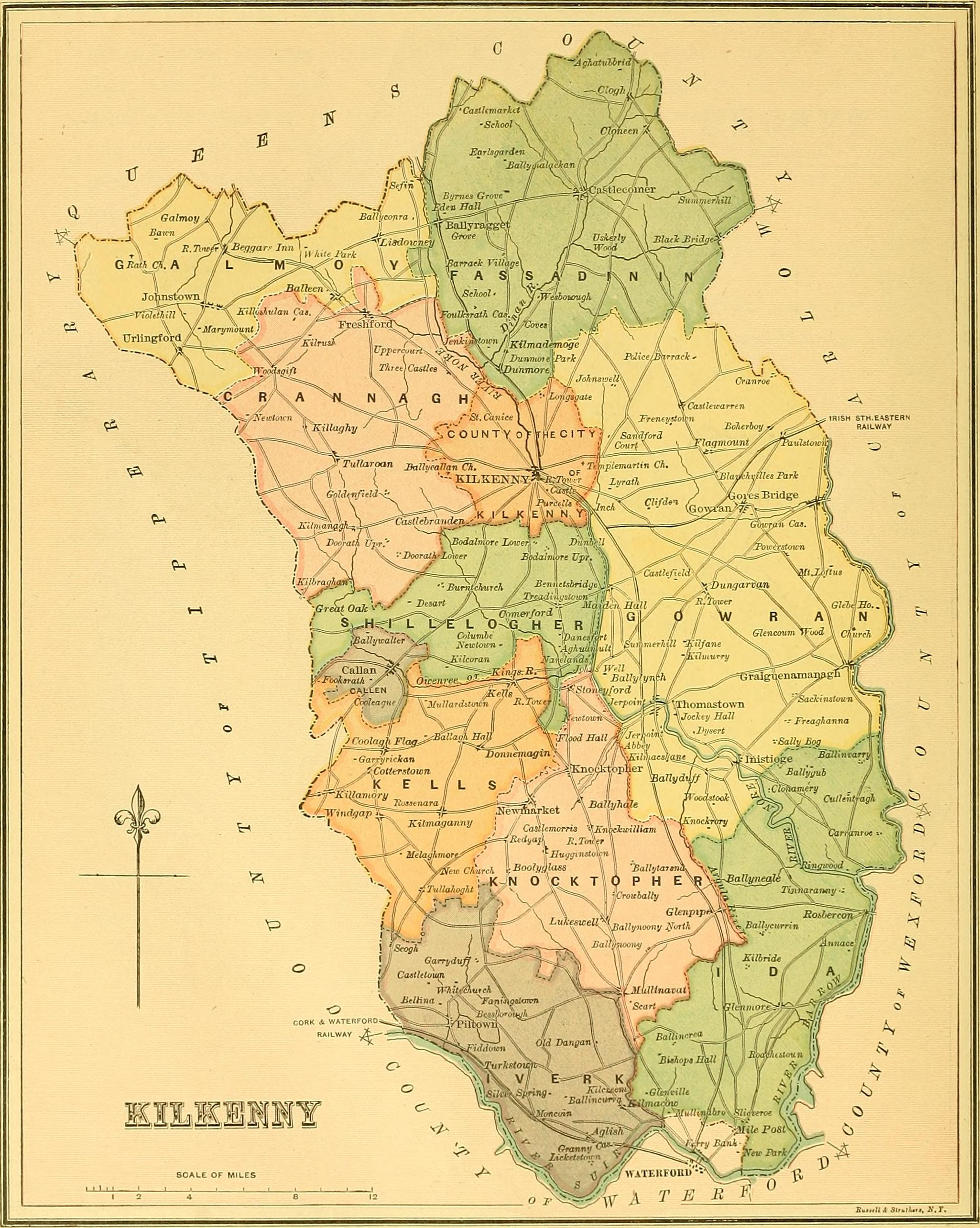
Map of County Kilkenny.

Iverk was part of the medieval Irish kingdom of Osraige. It was the territory of the Irish clan Uí Duach. In 1358 this Barony was known by its ancient name the "Cantred of Odoth". The earliest reference to the barony was in 1587, when it was described as the barony of "Fasaghdenyn and Idoghe".

The early Anglo-Norman records of "Overk in Ossory" included the present Barones of Iverk and Ida and the southern extremity of the barony of Knocktopher. The territory of Uibh-Eirc was co-extensive with the present Barony of Iverk.

Iverk was recorded in the Down Survey (1656), and on Griffith's Valuation (1864). Parts of the barony were in the Poor law unions of Carrick on Suir and Waterford.

Territory of O Faolain (O'Phelan) and O'Dunphy. Ballycastlane Cottage is located in Iverk.

== Geography ==
Iverk contains the towns of Pilltown, Kilmacow, Fiddown, Mooncoin and the settlements of Owning and Templeorum.

Iverk contains the civil parishes of Aglish, Arderra, Ballytarsney, Clonmore, Fiddown, Kilmacow, Muckalee, Pollrone, Portnascully, Rathkieran, Tibberaghny, Tubbrid, Ullid, and Whitechurch.

Fiddown Island and the Poulanassy and Lingaun River are in Iverk. It also contains a bogland called Moondeega. There is a wood called Corbally Wood.

== See also ==
- Barony (country subdivision)
- List of baronies of Ireland
- List of townlands in County Kilkenny
