= Freynestown, County Kilkenny =

Freynestown, County Kilkenny Baile an Fhreinigh
- Townland
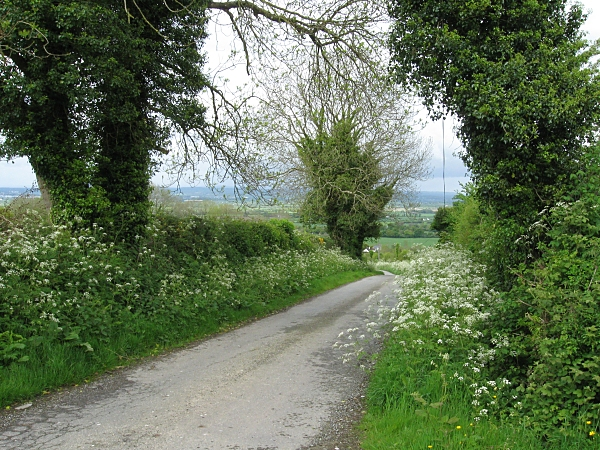
- Country Lane: nr.Freynestown, County Kilkenny

- Location in Ireland
- Coordinates: 52°41′03″N 7°07′39″W
- Country: Ireland
- Province: Leinster
- County: County Kilkenny
- Time zone: UTC+0
  - Summer (DST): UTC-1

Freynestown (Irish: Baile an Fhréinigh, meaning 'town of freyne') is a townland in the civil parish of Tiscoffin in the barony of Gowran, County Kilkenny, Ireland. Freynestown was anciently located in the Kingdom of Ossory and derives its name from the Cambro-Norman family of "de la Freyne.".

The seeds of Freynestown’s origins were sown around 1171 following the death of Diarmait Mac Murchada the Irish King of Leinster, when his son-in-law Richard de Clare, 2nd Earl of Pembroke alias Strongbow became Lord of Leinster. In opposition Domhnall Caomhánach son of Diarmait, was proclaimed King of Leinster by the local Irish clan chiefs citing the ancient Irish Brehon Laws.

However, despite intense opposition Strongbow launched a vigorous military campaign and commenced building fortresses, castles and towns. He also began initiating grants of land to his knights in exchange for military service. In 1192 William Marshal, 1st Earl of Pembroke, succeeded as Lord of Leinster having married Strongbow’s daughter Isabel de Clare, 4th Countess of Pembroke. He continued the process of land grants within the province and most of Ossory was shared amongst William's knights.

== Land grants ==
Around this period Ossory was divided into the ancient divisions known as cantreds or baronies. The cantreds of Odogh and Oskelan were divided up between the Bishop of Ossory and the Norman knights: with knight Fitzwarin; later named de la Freyne, being granted or inheriting portions. These cantreds would later evolve into the barony of Fassadinin and Gowran respectively.

In 1247 Geoffrey de Fraxino (de la Freyne) held a quarter Knight's fee at Kilmenan in the barony of Fassadinin held previously by a Walter Purcell.

In 1306 Odo de Fraxineto [Freyne] held one and a half Knight's fees in the barony of Gowran.

Fulk de la Freyne was sheriff of Kilkenny in 1327 and was knighted in 1335 in Ireland by James Butler, 1st Earl of Ormond for his valour. His son Patrick de la Freyne was Seneschal of Leinster.

John son of Fulk, was granted lands in Rathcash, parish of Tiscoffin wherein is the townland of Freneystown, as well as land in Lavistown townland south east of Kilkenny town.

From 1347 in Ireland:

Maurice Fitz Thomas, Earl of Kildare, and Lord Fulk de la Freigne, having been called and invited by the King entered France for the Siege of Calais that lasted from the preceding feast of the nativity of blessed Mary right up to the feast of St. Laurence, martyr. And then after many attacks and dreadful and incredible famine the French were compelled to submit they keys of the city and themselves to the mercy of the King of England.

Freynestown, like the whole of county Kilkenny, would from then on be included in the historical events of the period known as the Lordship of Ireland: before gradually slipping into a quiet rural existence.

== Early history ==
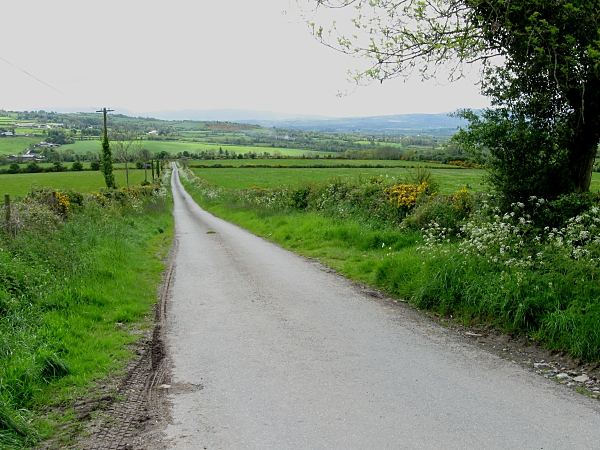
Country road in Freynestown

The ancient kingdom of Ossory was formed around the 2nd century when the Osraighe, an Érainn Iverni tribe, led by their King Aengus Osrithe, established a semi-independent state within the territory of the Laigin (Leinster).

Part of that territory now includes Freynestown and was in the early medieval period the Tuatha of the Ui Duach - the descendants of Duach who held these lands from the mid-6th century. The old barony of "Fassadinin and Idough" would loosely correspond to their lands: alternatively the cantreds of Ogenty and Oskelan.

This ancient cantred of Oskelan was that of the "Ui-Scellain - the descendants of Scellan, sixth in descent from Aengus Osrithe, the founder of the kingdom of Ossory: according to Edmund Curtis's 1933 edition of the Ormond Deeds." Also in the "Feilire of Aengus the Culdee" - "Hui Scellain was in Sliabh Mairge, the mountain district which, extending into Kilkenny from Carlow and Queen's County, embraced the Castlewarren, Johnswell, and Kilmogar hills, in the north of the Barony of Gowran."

The septs of Ua Braonáin (O'Brennan), Ua Donnchadha (Dunphy, O'Donoghue), Ua Cearbhaill (O'Carrowill, O'Carroll, MacCarroll) and Mac Giolla Phadraig (Fitzpatrick), were for many centuries dominant in this part of Ossory.

Freynestown townland is the location of the old monastery of St. Scuithin a 6th- and 7th-century Irish saint with strong connections to Wales. Tiscoffin Monastery is noted in the List of monastic houses in Ireland. The neighbouring town of Castlewarren celebrates this ancient saint's memory with the church of St.Scuithin.

There exists another Freynestown, near Dunlavin in County Wicklow which stems from the same family of "de la freyne"
