= R704 road =

R704 road may refer to:

- R704 road (Ireland)
- R704 (South Africa)
