= Irish Forest Rally Championship =

Rallying series in the Republic of Ireland

- Category: Rallying
- Country: Ireland
- Inaugural season: 1978
- Drivers' champion: (Republic of Ireland) Cathan McCourt (2019)
- Official website: Website

The National Forestry Rally, Motorsport Ireland National Forest Rally is a rallying series in the Republic of Ireland. It consists series of events, organized by a different motor club representing the region.

The championship is regulated by Motorsport Ireland who are the governing body of Motorsports in the Republic of Ireland.

== Seasons ==
=== 2022 ===
With COVID-19 restrictions effectively being lifted, full event calendar has been announced. Killarney Forestry Rally returned to the calendar after 15 years. Midland Forest Rally is scheduled for a debut, and the round 7 details are yet to be announced. Limerick Forest Rally, Lakeland Stages Rally and Sean Conlon Memorial Forestry Rally have been dropped this year.

2022 event calendar
Round	Dates	Event	Rally HQ	Organizer
1	20 February	Killarney Forestry Rally	Castleisland	Killarney and District Motor Club
2	10 April	Willie Loughman Forest Rally	Carrick-on-Suir	Carrick-on-Suir Motor Club
3	~~22 May~~ cancelled	Midland Forest Rally	Drumshanbo	Midland Motor Club
4	2 July	Moonraker Forest Rally	Ballyvourney	Munster Car Club
5	14 August	Jim Walsh Forest Rally	Mallow	Cork Motor Club
6	17 September	Bushwhacker Rally	Omagh	Omagh Motor Club
7	TBA	TBA	TBA	TBA

Round 1 of the event was stopped after rally driver Eoin McCarthy crashed heavily on stage 4. The competitor was transferred to the hospital, where he died from his injuries. His co-driver Daniel O'Brien only suffered minor injuries.

Round 3 of the event was cancelled 16 days before the rally as the organizers lost access and use of tracks of up to 1/3 of the rally mileage.

==== Results ====
Round	Winner
1	Desi Henry / Paddy Robinson (Ford Fiesta Rally2)
2	Patrick O'Brien / Stephen O'Brien (Škoda Fabia R5)
3	Cancelled
4	Keith Cronin / Mikie Galvin (VW Polo GTI R5)

=== 2021 ===
COVID-19 pandemic continued into 2021, and all motorsports events remained suspended. The Irish Forest Rally Championship was by default cancelled, although no announcement was made. As the vaccinations were progressing, at the end of May Motorsport Ireland announced that motorsports events can resume from 7 June, subject to local restrictions. There was no championship, but some of the Irish Forest Rally event dates were announced. Bushwhacker Rally and Lakeland Stages Rally were also announced by Northern Ireland's motor clubs.

Event	Proposed date	Organizer	Status
Moonraker Forest Rally	~~31 July~~	Munster Car Club	Postponed indefinitely on 6 July.
Bushwhacker Rally	18 August	Omagh Motor Club	Entries opened 26 August. Starting grid consisted of 114 starters.
Jim Walsh Cork Forest Rally	~~22 August~~	Cork Motor Club	Cancelled on 4 July.
Lakeland Stages Rally	~~4 September~~	Enniskillen Motor Club	Cancelled on 26 August.
Sean Conlon Memorial Forestry Rally	23 October	Tipperary Car Club	Not planned originally, announced on 25 September.

=== 2020 ===
The 2020 calendar included two changes, round 4 Cavan Forest Rally has been dropped in favor of Sean Conlon Memorial Forestry Rally, and round 7 Lakeland Stages Rally replaced by Bushwhacker Rally.

The Moonraker Forest Rally was initially scheduled 18 April, but later rescheduled to 28 March. Limerick Forest Rally on 1 March was postponed on the day due to snowfall, the new date proposed is 18–19 April.

On 12 March all motorsports events were postponed in the light of the coronavirus pandemic. On 20 March, Motorsport Ireland issued a statement that all motorsport events are suspended until 1 June 2020. After the government released a road map on easing the COVID-19 restrictions on 6 May, Motorsport Ireland released a statement same day that in line with Phase 4 of this road map the suspension of all motor sports events is extended until the 20 July 2020. Rally events fall under Phase 5 of the guidelines and will not be considered until after the 10 August 2020. On 19 May Motorsport Ireland cancelled the 2020 championship. Clubs might still be able to run events if they wish but it won't hold championship status.

Only the round 1 took place before rounds 2-6 were postponed, and eventually all remaining rounds were cancelled.

2020 event calendar before cancellation
Round	Dates	Event	Rally HQ	Organizer
1	16 February	Willie Loughman Forest Rally	Carrick-on-Suir	Carrick-on-Suir Motor Club
2	1 March cancelled	Limerick Forest Rally	Rockchapel	Limerick Motor Club
3	28 March cancelled	Moonraker Forest Rally	Ballyvourney	Munster Car Club
4	17 May cancelled	Sean Conlon Memorial Forestry Rally	Tipperary	Tipperary Car Club
5&6	25–26 July cancelled	Jim Walsh Forest Rally	Mallow	Cork Motor Club
7	26 September cancelled	Bushwhacker Rally	Omagh	Omagh Motor Club

=== 2019 ===
The calendar consisted of seven events, with a reserve Bushwhacker Rally on 21 September, which ended up not being included as a championship round.

The overall champion: (Republic of Ireland) Cathan McCourt, Ford Fiesta R5

Round	Dates	Event	Rally HQ	Organizer
1	20 January	Willie Loughman Forest Rally	Slieverue	Carrick-on-Suir Motor Club
2	3 March	Limerick Forest Rally	Rockchapel	Limerick Motor Club
3	13 April	Moonraker Forest Rally	Ballyvourney	Munster Car Club
4	18 May	Donegal Forest Rally	Bundoran	Donegal Motor Club
5&6	27–28 July	Jim Walsh Forest Rally	Mallow	Cork Motor Club
7	7 September	Lakeland Stages Rally	Enniskillen	Enniskillen Motor Club

Top 10 drivers overall:

Pos	Driver	Car	Class	1	2	3	4	5	6	7	Points	Points (best 5)
1	Cathan McCourt	Ford Fiesta R5	5	13	3	21	21	18	18	19	113	97
2	Michael Carbin	Mitsubishi Lancer Evo 8	20	9	19	16	16	13	15	15	103	81
3	Sam Moffett	Ford Fiesta R5	5	17	0	0	0	19	21	21	78	78
4	Niall McCullagh	Ford Fiesta R5	4	15	2	11	19	14	13	17	91	78
5	Conor McCourt	Ford Fiesta R5	5	11	2	1	18	17	16	16	81	78
6	Joe Hegarty	Mitsubishi Lancer Evo 9	20	8	9	17	17	7	1	14	73	65
7	David Crossen	Ford Escort Mk2	13	1	17	15	15	11	0	1	60	59
8	Martin McKenna	Ford Fiesta WRC	7	0	2	7	13	15	14	10	61	59
9	Barry McKenna	Ford Fiesta R5	5	16	1	1	0	21	19	0	58	58
10	Niall Henry	Citroen DS3 R5	5	14	7	19	1	0	0	15	56	56

=== 2018 ===
The calendar consisted of seven events. Round 4 was pushed forward by two weeks.

The overall champion: (Republic of Ireland) Josh Moffet, Ford Fiesta R5

Round	Dates	Event	Rally HQ	Organizer
1	3 February	Willie Loughman Forest Rally	Slieverue	Carrick-on-Suir Motor Club
2	4 March	Limerick Forest Rally	Rockchapel	Limerick Motor Club
3	14 April	Moonraker Forest Rally	Ballyvourney	Munster Car Club
4	14 July	Cavan Forest Rally	?	Cavan Motor Club
5	29 July	Jim Walsh Forest Rally	Mallow	Cork Motor Club
6	1 September	Lakeland Stages Rally	Enniskillen	Enniskillen Motor Club
7	22 September	Bushwhacker Rally	Omagh	Omagh Motor Club

Top 10 drivers overall:

Pos	Driver	Car	Class	1	2	3	4	5	6	7	Points	Points (best 5)
1	Josh Moffet	Ford Fiesta R5	5	2	21	19	18	21	21	21	123	103
2	Barry McKenna	Ford Fiesta R5	5	19	19	21	19	19	1	#	98	97
3	Cathan McCourt	Citroen DS3 R5	5	1	17	1	15	17	19	19	89	87
4	Stephen McCann	Ford Fiesta S2000	5	18	16	17	16	16	16	4	103	83
5	Andrew Purcell	Ford Fiesta R5	5	21	18	1	21	18	1	#	80	79
6	Donall Sweeney	Mitsubishi Lancer Evo 6	20	#	14	16	10	13	1	0	54	54
7	Conor McCourt	Mitsubishi Lancer Evo 9	4	13	2	#	11	14	13	1	54	53
8	Adrian Hetherington	Ford Escort RS1800	15	1	#	1	17	1	18	15	53	52
9	Shane McGirr	Toyota Starlet RWD	13	1	11	13	13	12	1	0	51	50
10	Mickey Conlon	Ford Escort Mk2	14	11	10	10	8	9	2	0	50	48

- Note: # - did not start

=== 2017 ===
The calendar originally consisted of seven events, however round 2 was cancelled. The best 5 results counted towards championship points.

The overall champion: (Republic of Ireland) Sam Moffet, Ford Fiesta WRC

Round	Dates	Event	Rally HQ	Organizer
1	12 February	Willie Loughman Forest Rally	Slieverue	Carrick-on-Suir Motor Club
2 (cancelled)	4 March	Sean Conlon Memorial Forestry Rally	Tipperary	Tipperary Car Club
3	8 April	Moonraker Forest Rally	Ballyvourney	Munster Car Club
4	13 May	Donegal Forest Rally	Bundoran	Donegal Motor Club
5	30 July	Jim Walsh Forest Rally	Mallow	Cork Motor Club
6	2 September	Lakeland Stages Rally	Enniskillen	Enniskillen Motor Club
7	23 September	Bushwhacker Rally	Omagh	Omagh Motor Club

Top 10 drivers overall:

Pos	Driver	Car	Class	1	2	3	4	5	6	7	Points	Points (best 5)
1	Sam Moffet	Ford Fiesta WRC	5	19	-	19	#	21	19	19	97	97
2	David Crossen	Ford Escort Mk2	13	10	-	11	19	18	16	12	86	76
3	Gerard Lucey	Mitsubishi Lancer Evo 8	20	13	-	16	16	16	13	#	74	74
4	Jonny Leonard	Mitsubishi Lancer Evo 6	20	14	-	15	1	19	2	16	67	66
5	Josh Moffett	Ford Fiesta R5	5	21	-	21	#	#	21	#	63	63
6	Jordan Hone	Mitsubishi Lancer Evo 9	4	1	-	14	2	17	15	8	57	56
7	Adrian Hetherington	Ford Fiesta R5	15	16	-	17	1	1	1	18	54	53
8	Mickey Conlon	Ford Escort Mk2	13	8	-	9	17	11	#	5	50	50
9	Liam Regan	Mitsubishi Lancer Evo	20	11	-	13	#	#	12	14	50	50
10	Enda McCormack	Subaru Impreza S10	7	7	-	12	13	15	2	#	49	49

- Note: # - did not start

== Sponsors ==
The main event sponsors are the Coillte - the national forestry company, and Valvoline - the overall title sponsor.

== Broadcasting ==
The TV coverage is captured by On the Limit Sports. The viewers can view the series on TG4 and RTE Player in Ireland, as well as on satellite channel and Motorsport.tv.
