= Tiscoffin =

Tiscoffin Tigh Scoithín
- Civil Parish
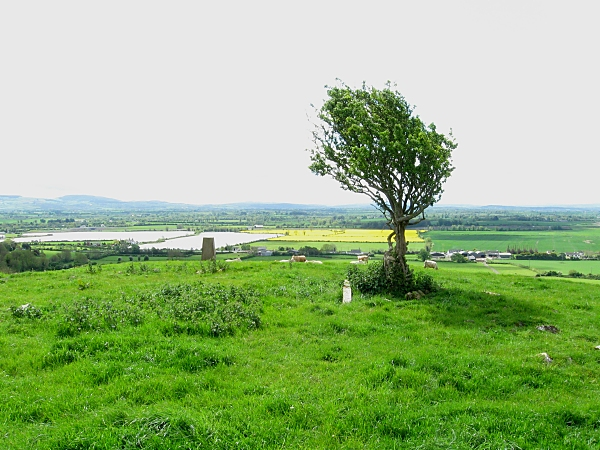
- Hawthorn tree, Freestone hill, Tiscoffin

- Location in Ireland
- Coordinates: 52°39′15″N 7°07′50″W
- Country: Ireland
- Province: Leinster
- County: County Kilkenny
- Time zone: UTC+0
  - Summer (DST): UTC-1

Tiscoffin (Irish: Tigh Scoithín, meaning 'house of Scoithín') is a civil parish, in County Kilkenny, Ireland.

It lies in the old barony of Gowran, county of Kilkenny, and province of Leinster, roughly ten kilometres east of Kilkenny town. Tiscoffin is reputedly the site of a battle in 1362, where James Butler, 2nd Earl of Ormond slew around six hundred of the clan of the Mac Murroughs - (Art Mór Mac Murchadha Caomhánach).

Tiscoffin parish is the location of Freestone hill: the site of an Iron Age ringfort and Bronze Age cairn. During archaeological excavations in 1948 and 1949 led by Dr. Gerhard Bersu, a number of important Roman artifacts were unearthed. These included: a decorated bracelet, a possible buckle stud, a strip of decorated bronze and three rings, a copper coin of Constantine the Great (c.337 to 340AD), iron needles, a blue glass bracelet, two shreds of later Roman pottery and a small, polished cone.

On top of Freestone hill stands an ancient hawthorn tree long held in reverence by the local population.

Freynestown townland was the site of the old monastery of St. Scuithin from whom Tiscoffin-(Tigh Scuithin) drives its placename.

In A Topographical Dictionary of Ireland, published in 1837, Tiscoffin is described as:

The parish comprises 7128 statute acres; Culm has been found within its limits, and was formerly worked. It is a rectory, in the Diocese of Ossory, constituting the corps of the prebend of Tascoffin in the cathedral of St Canice, Kilkenny, and in the patronage of the Bishop. The church was built in 1796, when the late Board of First Fruits gave £500 towards its erection, and the Ecclesiastical Commissioners have lately granted £308 for its repair.

In the R. C. divisions this parish forms part of the union or district of Gowran, and contains a chapel. About 130 children are educated in three private schools

== Townlands ==
Tiscoffin civil parish includes the following townlands:

- Blanchvilleskill
- Castlewarren
- Coolgreany
- Coolmarks
- Coolgrange
- Freynestown
- Grangehill
- Moonhall
- Rathcash Little
- Rathcash East
- Rathcash West
- Reevanagh
