= Kilbeacon =

Parish in County Kilkenny, Ireland

Kilbeacon is a civil parish in the ancient barony of Knocktopher. It is located in the south of County Kilkenny, Ireland and is around 22 miles (35 km) south of the city of Kilkenny on the road to Waterford. The parish contains 3,151 statute acres. (Note: "A topographical dictionary of Ireland" - Samuel Lewis, 1837.) According to Lewis's survey of 1837, (Note: "A topographical dictionary of Ireland" - Samuel Lewis, 1837.) "At Earlsrath was a large fort, encompassed by a fosse and a bank about 20 feet high.". In 1833, there were 383 inhabited houses in the parish; of these, 270 families were primarily engaged in agriculture, 61 in manufactures or crafts, 52 in other. The total population was 2,284 people. (Note: Accounts and Papers: Population of Ireland, Volume XXXIV, pg44)

The main settlement in the parish is the village of Mullinavat which is located in parish's most southerly townland of the same name.

== Geography ==
The Black Water, which is a tributary of the River Suir, flows through the parish from north to south. The highest point in the parish, at 200m, is in the eastern townland of Ballynooney East.

== Ecclesiastical parish ==
Like all civil parishes, this civil parish is derived from, and co-extensive with a pre-existing Church of Ireland parish of the same name. (Note: John Caillard Erck, The ecclesiastical register: containing the names of the dignitaries and parochial clergy of Ireland : as also of the parishes and their respective patrons and an account of monies granted for building churches and glebe-houses with ecclesiastical annals annexed to each diocese and appendixes : containing among other things several cases of quare impedit, (1927), page 113)). In the Diocese of Cashel and Ossory, the church mentioned in Lewis's survey is located in the townland of Garrandarragh. (Note: Buildings of Ireland - Church of Ireland building.) The building was in use from 1750 to 1900; today, only the tombstones of the adjoining graveyard are visible. (Note: Buildings of Ireland - Reg. No. 12404003.)

In the Catholic Church, the civil parish forms part of the ecclesiastical parish of Mullinavat in the Roman Catholic Diocese of Ossory. (Note: Catholic Diocese of Ossory - Mullinavat parish) It also includes in its territory the area of the civil parishes of Killahy (between the rivers Black Water and Pollanassa); Rossin (on the southern side of Tory Hill); and the northern part of Dunkitt (also known as "Big Wood") in the neighbouring barony of Ida. Prior to 1842 this parish was united with Kilmacow.

== Townlands ==
There are 11 townlands in the parish.

Name in Gaelic	Name in English	Acres
An Baile Loiscthe	Ballylusky	325
Baile an Inneonaigh Thoir	Ballynoony East	417
Baile an Inneonaigh Thiar	Ballynoony West	1,326
Baile Bhaitín	Ballyvatheen	103
Cúil an Adhmaid Thuaidh	Coolanimod North	164
Cúil an Adhmaid Theas	Coolanimod South	113
Ráth an Iarla	Earlsrath	144
An Garrán Darach	Garrandarragh	376
Cúirt an Mhoinséalaigh	Manselscourt	229
Muileann an Bhata	Mullinavat	32
Baile an Ghabhann Beag	Smithstown	169
