= Tullaherin =

Tullaherin Irish: An Tulaigh Thirim
- Civil parish
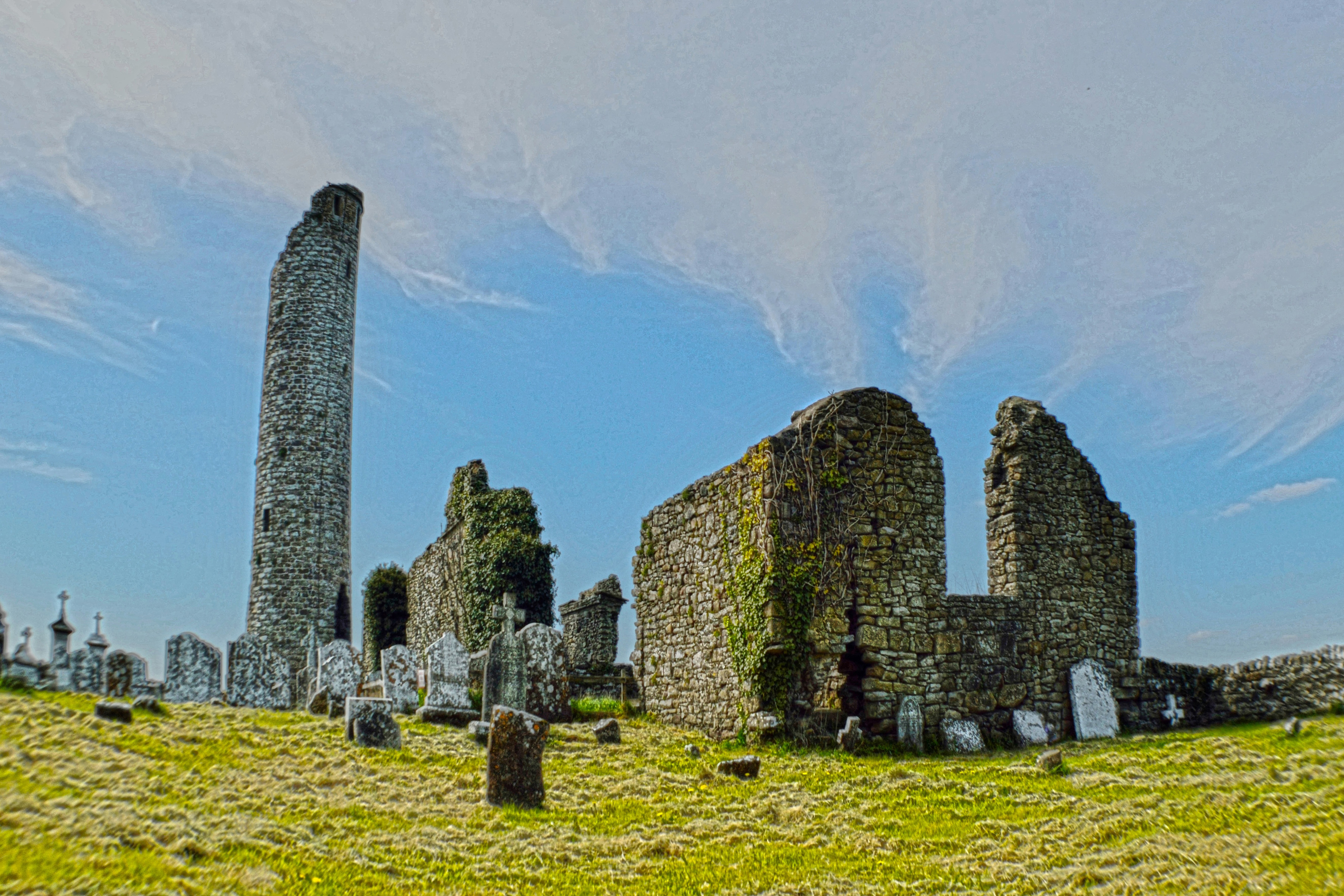
- Tullaherin Monastic site

- Location within Ireland
- Coordinates: 52.58°N 7.13°W
- Country: Ireland
- County: Kilkenny
- Barony: Gowran

Tullaherin (Irish: An Tulaigh Thirim) is a civil parish and townland in County Kilkenny, Ireland.

== History ==
Tullaherin townland is the site of a number of historical archeological remains, including a round tower, an 11th-13th century ruined church and two ogham stones. Kilbline Castle, a 16th-century tower house, also lies within the civil parish.

The Tullaherin round tower stands 22.5 m high and was probably built in the 11th century. The cap is missing and the top 3 m are a second phase of masonry. It is reported that the tower was struck by lightning in 1121, causing a stone to fall, killing a student in the church. Most probably it was after this date that the top was rebuilt on the same principle as Clonmacnoise with eight windows instead of the usual four.

The present church at Tullaherin was built about 1840. (Note: "The church being dedicated to St. Kieran, the name, Tullaherin, was generally supposed to signify the height of Kieran; but it was sometimes pronounced and spelled Tullaherim, which would mean the dry hill, a term certainly descriptive of its peculiar situation, it being elevated ground nearly surrounded by a marsh.") The Tullaherin Folk Museum can be viewed at the old parochial residence. The museum was established in 1981 by Duchas and the Tullaherin Heritage Society.
