= Tybroughney =

Tibberaghny Tiobra Fhachna
- Civil parish, townland
- Location in Ireland
- Coordinates: 52°20′42″N 7°21′46″W
- Country: Ireland
- Province: Leinster
- County: County Kilkenny

Area
  - Total: 4.644 km^{2} (1.793 sq mi)
- Time zone: UTC+0 (WET)
  - Summer (DST): UTC-1 (IST (WEST))
- Ref

Tybroughney, statutory spelling Tibberaghny (Irish: Tiobra Fhachna), is a civil parish in the barony of Iverk, County Kilkenny in Ireland. The parish comprises a single townland, also called Tibberaghny. It lies on the north bank of the River Suir facing County Waterford, while the Lingaun river separates it from County Tipperary to the west.

== Name ==
The name Tiobra Fhachna means "well of Saint Fachtna", who was at Lismore Abbey in the seventh century. Various anglicised spellings include Tibberaghny, Tiberaghny, Tipperaghny, Tybroughney, Tyburoughny, Tibroughny, Tybrachny.

== History ==
Saint Fachtna's well, the holy well from which the townland is named, lies near the ruined former parish church. Saint Modomnoc reputedly lived as a hermit in the area in the sixth century, and a pattern was celebrated there on 13 February, his feast day. The church was built before the Norman invasion of Ireland, and the parish formerly belonged to the Diocese of Lismore rather than the Diocese of Ossory. A pillar in the churchyard is carved in the style of a Celtic high cross, of which it may be a remnant. In the Church of Ireland the parish was united to Whitechurch parish by 1821, and in 1833 both were among five civil parishes in the benefice of Fiddown. In the Catholic church it is part of Templeorum parish.

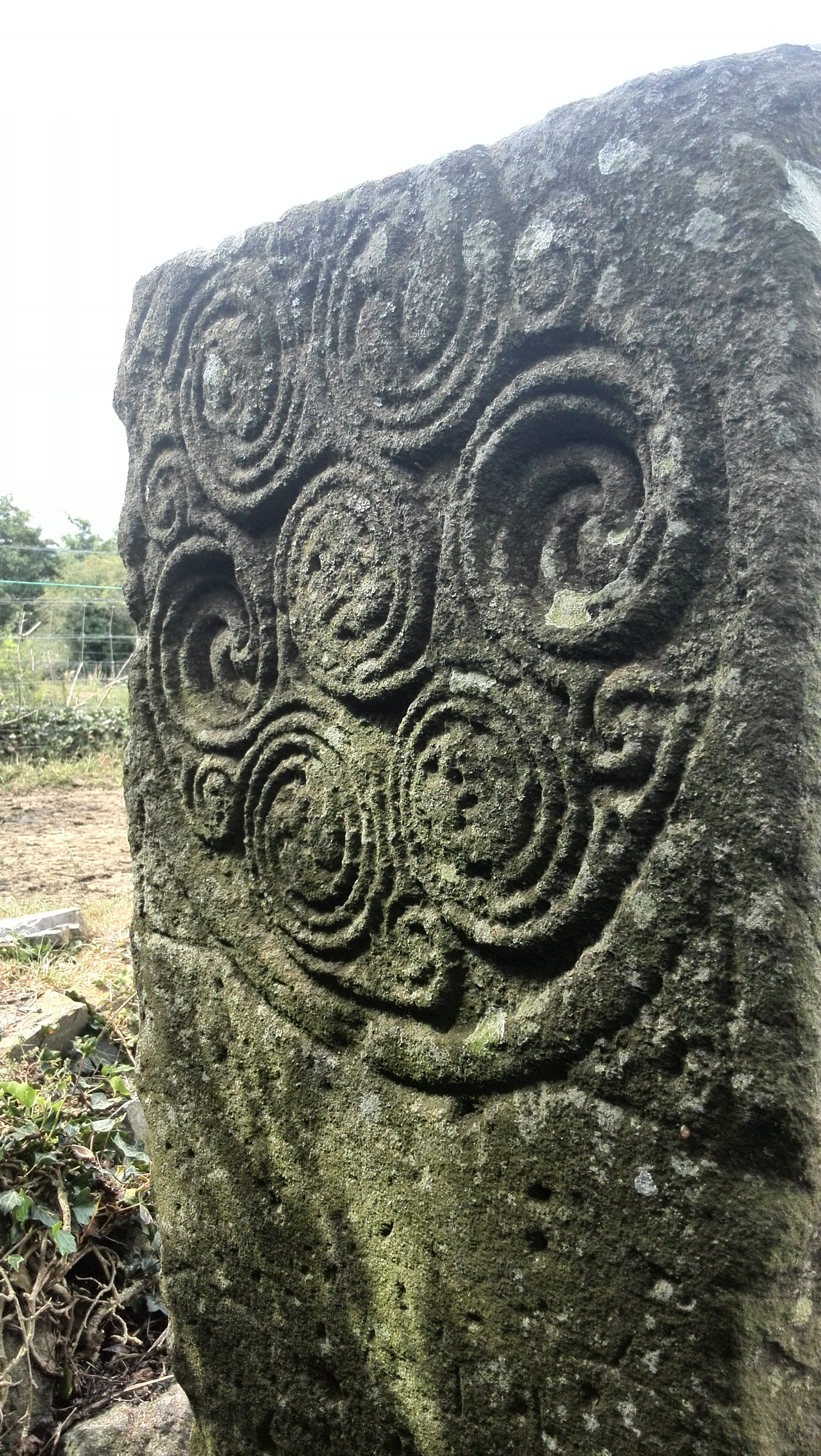
Tibberaghny Standing Stone East side

The site is at the limit of access upstream on the Suir for medieval sea-going vessels. A Viking settlement here was destroyed in 980. Prince John of England built a castle here in 1185 with another at Ardfinnan and Lismore, shortly after the Norman invasion, to guard the northern border of Waterford. John's castle may have been built on the site of the extant Tybroughney Castle built in the 15th century, or a motte-and-bailey on a now-empty height near by. The parish was in County Tipperary as late as 1536, but had been transferred to County Kilkenny by 1649.

=== Population ===
Censuses recorded population by townland until 1911.

Population of civil parish and townland of Tibberaghny at decennial censuses
Year	1841	1851	1861	1871	1881	1891	1901	1911
Population	278	247	210	190	147	128	104	71

== Transport ==
The section of the N24 road between Carrick-on-Suir and Piltown runs through the north of the townland. Further south is the Limerick–Rosslare railway line, between Carrick-on-Suir station and Waterford station. A nearer station at Fiddown closed in 1964.
