= Scuithin =

Irish saint with strong Welsh connections

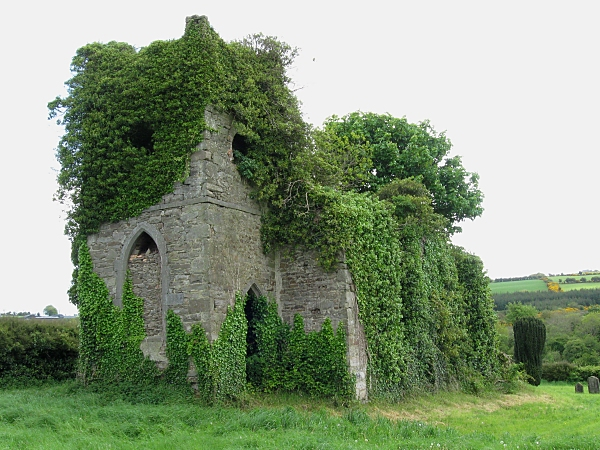
- Old church ruins at Freynestown

Old church ruins at Freynestown, County Kilkenny
- Born: 6th century
- Residence: Freynestown, County Kilkenny
- Died: 7th century
- Venerated in: Eastern Orthodoxy, Roman Catholic Church
- Feast: 2 January
- Patronage: Castlewarren, County Kilkenny
- Influences: St. David of Wales
- Tradition or genre: St. Scuithin monastery, Johnswell hills, County Kilkenny

St. Scuithin (fl. 6th/7th century) also known as Scolan, Scothin or Scuitin, was a medieval Irish saint with strong Welsh connections. Sometime in the 6th century, Scuthin left Ireland to pursue a life of cenobitic monasticism at Tyddewi in Wales, founded by St. David (whom at a later date, he was reported to have saved from poisoning).

According to the Irish Ecclesiastical Record, St. Scuithin, having attained advanced ascetic virtues, returned to Ireland c. 540 to live the life of a hermit monk, building himself an austere and isolated cell. This cell was located at Freynestown, on the Johnswell hills in the ancient barony of Slieve Margy, Kingdom of Ossory. This habitat would become known in Irish as tigh scuithin and evolve into Tiscoffin monastery as noted in the List of monastic houses in Ireland.

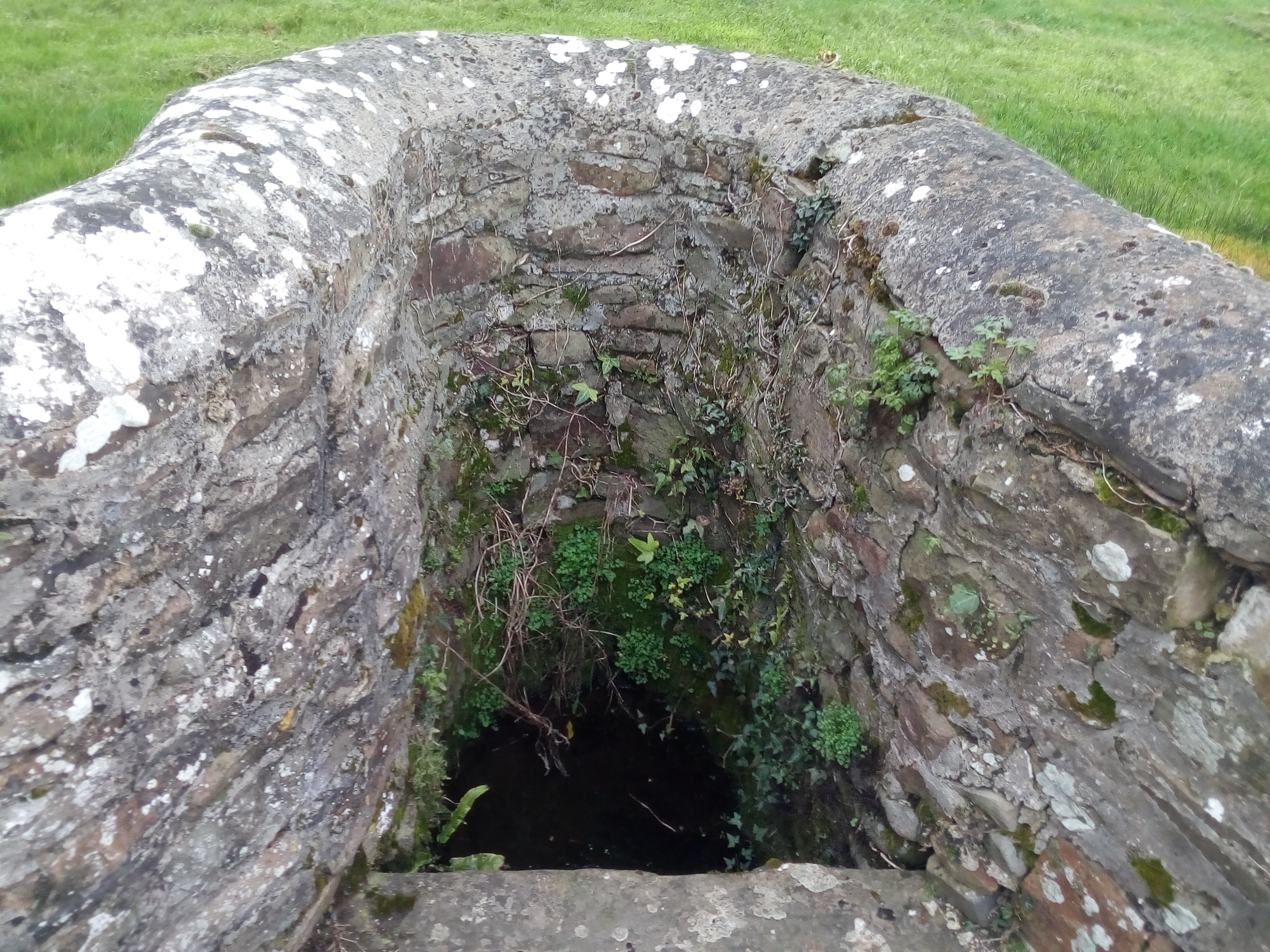
Saint Scuithin's Well in Freneystown

In the Irish language tigh scuithin means the house/abode of Scuithin. This has been anglicised as Tiscoffin and preserved as one of the civil parishes in Ireland within the Kilkenny Barony of Gowran. The county Kilkenny town of Castlewarren in the Diocese of Ossory also preserves his name with the church of St. Scuithin. The townland of Freynestown is closely associated with St. Scuithin.

== St. Scuithin of Bed-Yscolan ==
There exists an apparently significant historical reference to St. Scuithin in the ancient annals of Wales. William Forbes Skene, in the Four Ancient Books of Wales, (Edinburgh, 1868) while reviewing poems in the Black Book of Carmarthen makes reference to this saint. There is a poem in which St. Scuithin, described as Yscolan, is confronted by the figure of Myrddin Wyllt. A portion of the poem reads:

Black thy horse, black thy cope, black thy head, black thyself, Yes, black art thou, Yscolan.
I am Yscolan the scholar, slight is my clouded reason, there is no drowning the woe of him who offends a sovereign....

Skene further states that the same name occurs in the lives of St. David, when he is said to have met an Irish ecclesiastic called Scuthyn, at a place later called Bed-y-Scolan.

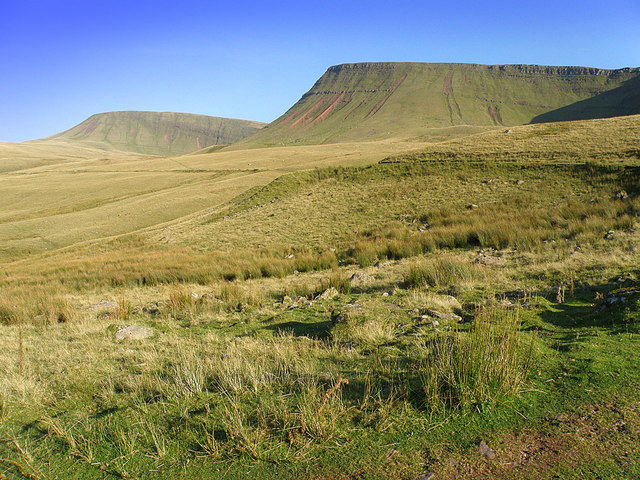
Carmarthen Fan

== Asceticism of St. Scuithin ==
It is recorded that St. Scuithin led a life of austere self-discipline and on being quizzed by his contemporary St. Brendan how he was preserved from temptation, he responded that whenever he slept, two heavenly virgins, i.e., divine hope and charity, kept watch by his side to protect him from evil attack. He was so spiritualized by his constant penance, and so unconcerned with worldly attractions, that he is said to have been able to walk on water.

Legend states that once while performing this act on the waters between Ireland and Wales he met St. Finbarr in his boat. St. Scuithin grasped a variegated flower - a scuitliin from the water and threw it to St. Finbarr saying: “See how, by the mercy of God, it is in a flowery meadow that we are journeying." To which St. Finbarr replied: “This is not a flowery meadow, but the sea;" and plunging his hand into the water, he caught a salmon which he tossed to St. Scuithin, saying: "See how richly it is supplied by God to minister to our wants."

The note in the Felire of St. Oengus adds, that it was on account of that variegated flower that our Saint received his name of Scuithin.

== St. Scuithin of Slieve Margy and St. Gobban of Old Leighlin ==
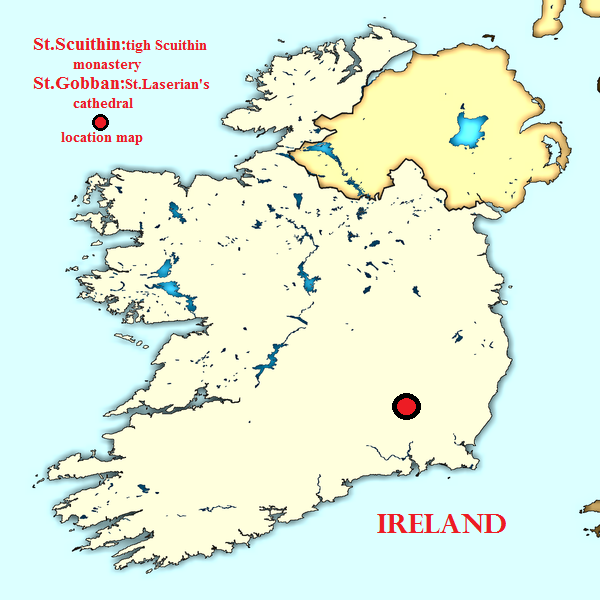
Location map for St. Scuithin's and St.Gobban's monasteries.

The ancient habitat and personae of St. Scuithin is often confused with that of St. Gobban of Old Leighlin which is some seven kilometres distant. St. Gobban founded his monastery in the early 7th century; it would later evolve into St. Laserian's Cathedral, Old Leighlin, County Carlow. Confusion exists regarding the various holy men named St. Goban.

The close proximity of these two ancient ecclesiastical sites, plus the passage of time, distortion of language and dialect has entwined and confused the true identities of these saints of early Celtic Christianity. St. Scuithin and St. Goban were two distinct historical persons.

== St. Scuithin in the Annals ==
He was described in the History and Antiquities of the Diocese of Ossory as:

Scothin, son of Setnae. son of Trebthach, son of Dal, son of Laidir (Cu-corb's charioteer), son of Imrossa Nith, son of Fertlachtga, son of Fergus mac Roig.

He is also entered January 2, in The Martyrology of Donegal as:

Sguithin of Tech-Sguithin, in Sliabh Mairge, in Leinster.

Two ancient manuscripts in the Bibliothèque Royale, Brussels preserve St. Scuithin's memory in poetry:

And on Scoithin of great Slieve Margy – known for his holy rigour.
