= Willie Loughman Forest Rally =

Annual motorsport forest rally in Ireland

- Category: Rally
- Inaugural season: 1985
- Drivers' champion: (Northern Ireland) James Wilson
- Co-Drivers' champion: (Republic of Ireland) Arthur Kierans

Irish Forest Rally Championship

South East Stages Rally Championship

National Rally Championship (1985–1988)

Willie Loughman Forest Rally
- Dates: February 15, 2020 - February 16, 2020
- Frequency: Annual
- Location: County Tipperary
- Country: (Republic of Ireland) Ireland
- Most recent: 2020
- Organiser: Carrick-on-Suir Motor Club
- Sponsor: The Carraig Hotel; Suirway Forklifts
- Website: Website

The Carrick-on-Suir William Loughman Forestry Rally, William Loughman Memorial Forestry Rally is an annual motorsport forest rallying event held in County Tipperary, Ireland. Promoted and organised by Carrick-on-Suir Motor Club, Wm. Loughman Forestry Rally is long-standing opening round of the Irish Forest Rally Championship.

It was also a stage in South East Stages Rally Championship in 2002 and 2006. It is back on the calendar since 2019.

== History ==
Starting in 1985 as Carrick-on-Suir Forest Rally, the Willie Loughman Memorial Forestry Rally is Ireland's longest running forestry rally. The event ran every year with exception of 2001 due to the outbreak of foot-and-mouth disease.

In the early years the rally would start at midnight at the forestry gate, follow the route arrows, and finish the stage at the forestry exit gate. The arrow signs were made from tin by Willie Loughman, to whose name the forestry rally is now dedicated.

== 2020 ==
The 2020 event was the opening round for the Irish Forest Rally Championship and the South East States Rally Championship. Directed by the Clerk of the Course Liam Mackey, the event consisted of 59.44 stage kilometers and 144.12 road kilometers divided into 6 stages. This year's entry fee was €700. The rally went ahead despite heavy winds and rain caused by Storm Dennis. Out of 70 starters, 48 have reached the finish line. James Wilson, 2018 Billy Coleman Award winner, led the rally from start to finish.

== Roll of Honor ==
Rally winners
Season	Driver	Co-driver	Car
2020	James Wilson	Arthur Kierans	Hyundai i20 R5
2019	Marty McCormack	Barney Mitchell	Škoda Fabia R5
2018	Andrew Purcell	Mark Wiley	Ford Fiesta R5
2017	Josh Moffett	Stephen Thornton	Ford Fiesta R5
2016	Sam Moffett	James Fulton	Ford Fiesta R5
2015	Michael O'Brien	James O'Brien	Ford Focus RS WRC '08
2014	Josh Moffett	Jason McKenna	Mitsubishi Lancer Evo IX
2013	Owen Murphy	James O'Brien	Mitsubishi Lancer Evo IX
2012	Craig Breen	Gareth Roberts	Ford Fiesta S2000
2011	Owen Murphy	James O'Brien	Mitsubishi Lancer Evo IX
2010	Pat O'Connell	Mark Wiley	Mitsubishi Lancer Evo IX
2009	Trevor J. Harding	Andrew Purcell	Subaru Impreza 555
2008	Ray Breen	Craig Breen	Ford Focus RS WRC '04
2007	Stephen Moore	Tony McHugh	Ford Focus RS WRC '04
2006	Kenny McKinstry	Kenny Hull	Subaru Impreza S7 WRC '01
2005	Gareth MacHale	Paul Nagle	Toyota Corolla WRC
2004	Kevin Lynch	Francis Regan	Subaru Impreza S6 WRC '00
2003	John McCarthy	Dan Maguire	Subaru Impreza 555
2002	Robbie McGurk	Rory Kennedy	Subaru Impreza Sti
2001	no rally - outbreak of foot and mouth disease		
2000	Peter McCullagh sr.	Mark Murphy	Ford Escort RS Cosworth
1999	Kenny McKinstry	Paddy Toner	Subaru Impreza 555
1998	no data		
1997	no data		
1996	no data		
1995	no data		
1994	Richie Curran	Gerry English	Ford Sierra Cosworth
1993	Richie Curran	Gerry English	Vauxhall Chevette HSR
1992	no data		
1991	no data		
1990	no data		
1989	no data		
1988	Frank Meagher	O'Sullivan	Ford Escort RS 1800 MKII
1987	no data		
1986	Kevin O'Kane	Noel Alexander	Talbot Sunbeam Lotus
1985	James Doherty	Michael Curley	Vauxhall Chevette 2300 HSR

Driver most wins
(United Kingdom) Kenny McKinstry	2
(Republic of Ireland) Moffett Josh	2
(Republic of Ireland) Richie Curran	2

Driver most starts
(Republic of Ireland) Sean Benskin	15
(Republic of Ireland) John Reid	14
(Republic of Ireland) Gerard Lucey	13
(Republic of Ireland) Alan Commins	12
(Republic of Ireland) Ray Benskin sr.	11
(Republic of Ireland) Gemma Kerley	11
(United Kingdom) Kevin O'Kane	11
(Republic of Ireland) James Coleman	10
(Republic of Ireland) Michael Nevin	10
(Republic of Ireland) Mark Murply	10
(Republic of Ireland) Andrew Purcell	10

Most stage wins
(Republic of Ireland) Andrew Purcell	8
(United Kingdom) Kevin Lynch	7
(Republic of Ireland) John McCarthy	7
(Republic of Ireland) Josh Moffett	7
(Republic of Ireland) Sam Moffett	7
(Republic of Ireland) Owen Murphy	7

* as of 2020
