= Kilkeasy =

Kilkeasy Irish: Cill Chéise
- Civil parish
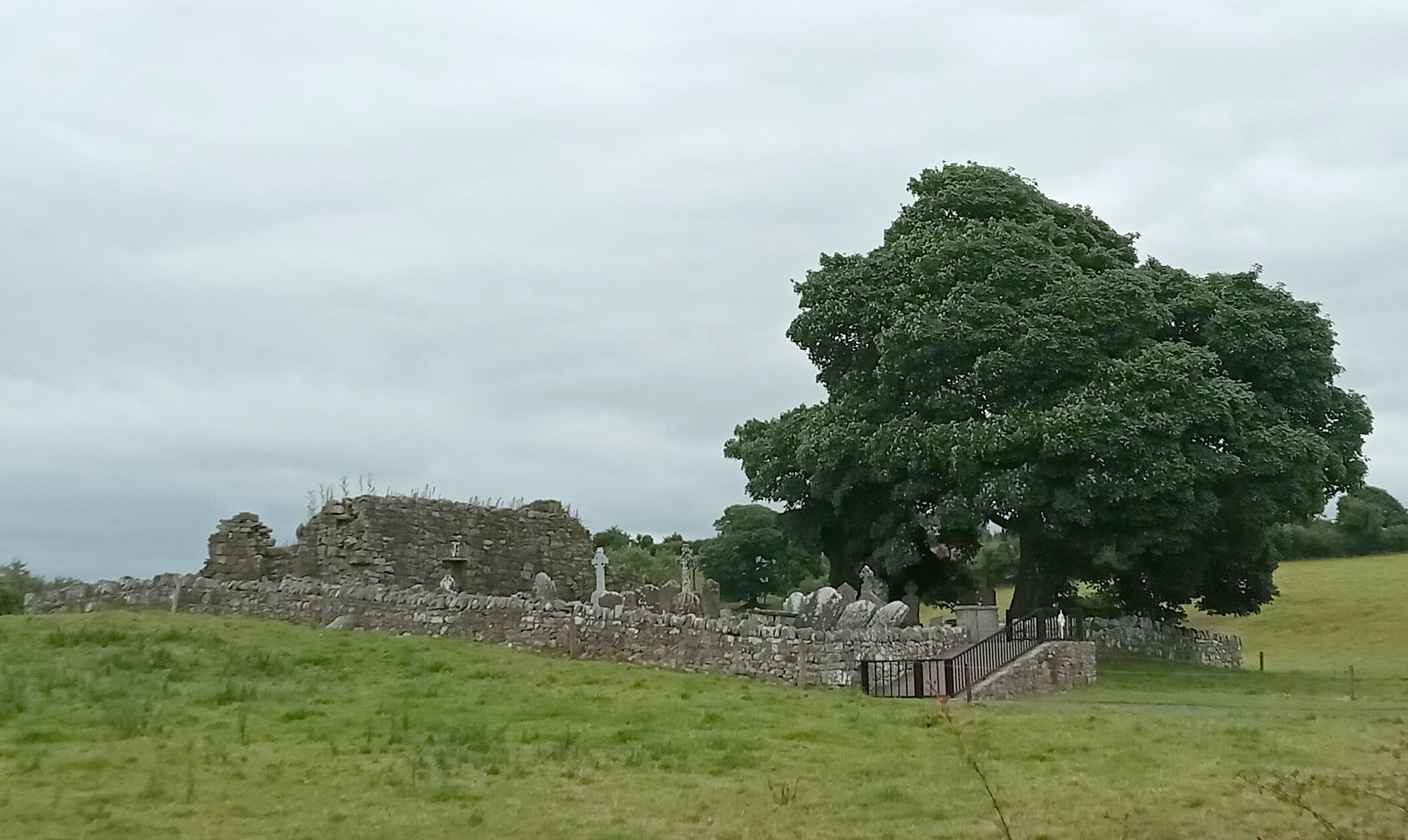
- Cemetery and ruined church in Kilkeasy

- Location within Ireland
- Coordinates: 52.441°N 7.225°W
- Country: Ireland
- County: Kilkenny
- Barony: Knocktopher
- Irish grid reference: S528324

Kilkeasy (Irish: Cill Chéise) is a civil parish in the historical barony of Knocktopher in County Kilkenny, Ireland. Kilkeasy civil parish, which has an area of approximately 13.4 square kilometres (5.2 mi^{2}), contains the townlands of Ballybray, Kilkeasy and Knockmoylan. Kilkeasy also shares its name with a local electoral division.

Within Kilkeasy townland is a ruined church and graveyard. This graveyard contains a reputed holy well that, according to local folklore, is said to cure warts and sore eyes. The source for the "healing water" is an opening in a tree which is routinely filled with water. There is also a memorial stone to Thomas Phelan, who died in the nearby Battle of Carrickshock, within the graveyard.

Kilkeasy Bog, a wetland area comprising lakes and heathland, is a proposed Natural Heritage Area.

== Gallery ==
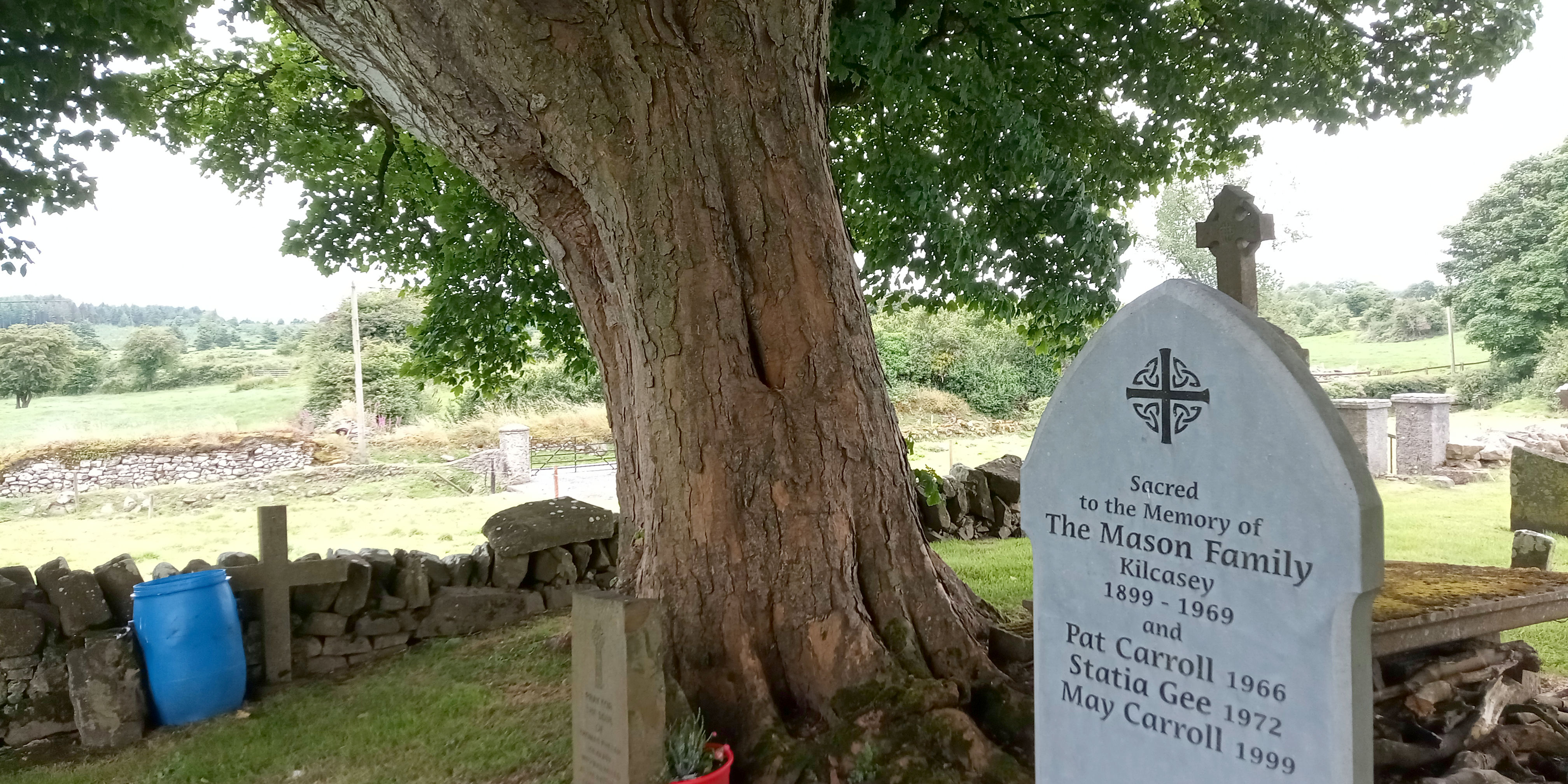
Tree in Kilkeasy graveyard; Phelan memorial stone to the left

Video of Kilkeasy graveyard

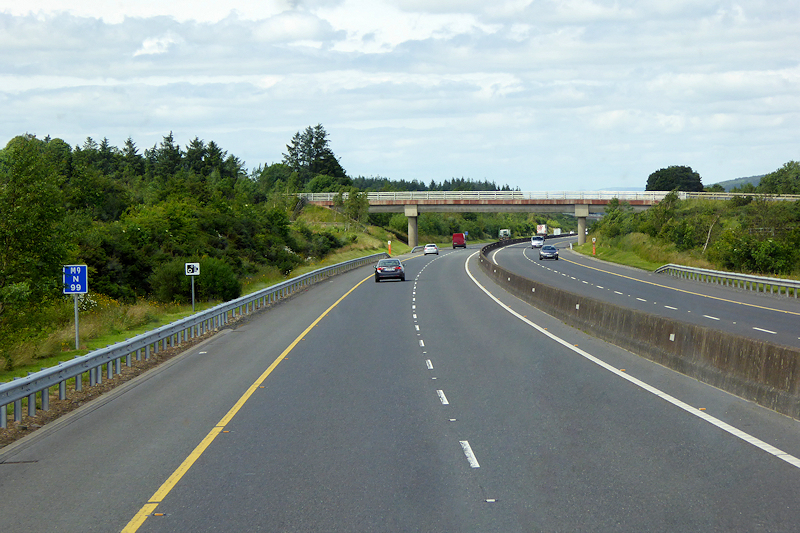
The M9 motorway passes through the area

== See also ==
- Hugginstown
