= Kilkenny Blackwater =

River in the county of Kilkenny, Ireland

Coordinates: 52°16′35″N 7°08′34″W

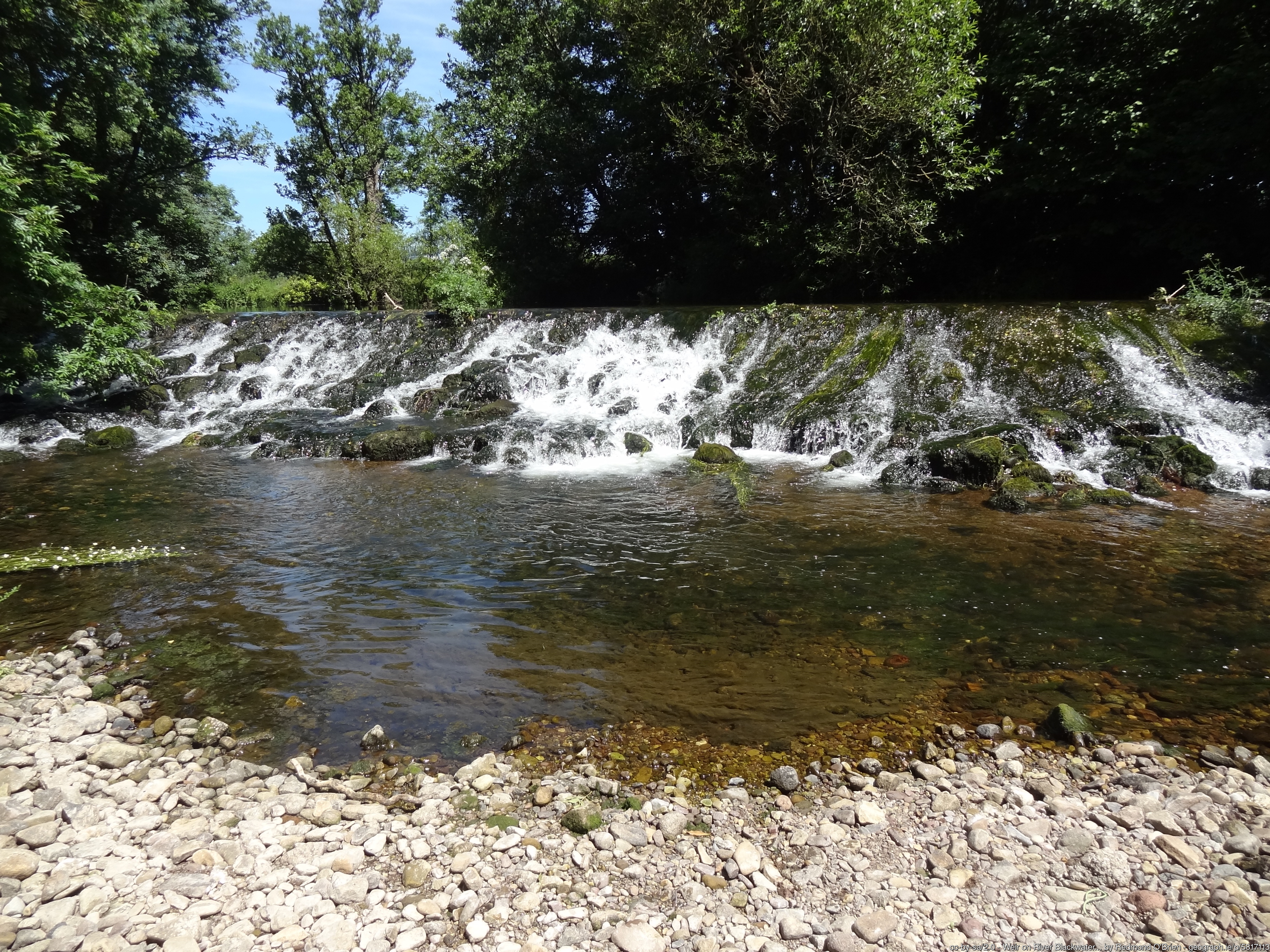
Weir on River Blackwater in Kilkenny

River Blackwater is a tributary of the River Suir in County Kilkenny, Ireland. It is formed by the confluence of the Derrylacky River and the Poulanassy or Assy River just to the south of Mullinavat before it flows southwards through the village of Kilmacow before joining the Suir estuary below the townland of Dunkitt.

A rubble stone bridge crosses the river near Kilmacow. Built about 1775 it is believed to incorporate some of a late medieval bridge of C1600. It comprises eight pointed segmental arches with squared voussoirs and rubble stone soffits. The unrefined rustic quality means it integrates well in the rural landscape.
