= Ida (barony) =

Barony in County Kilkenny, Ireland

Ida Uí Dheá (Irish) Barony of Ida
- Barony
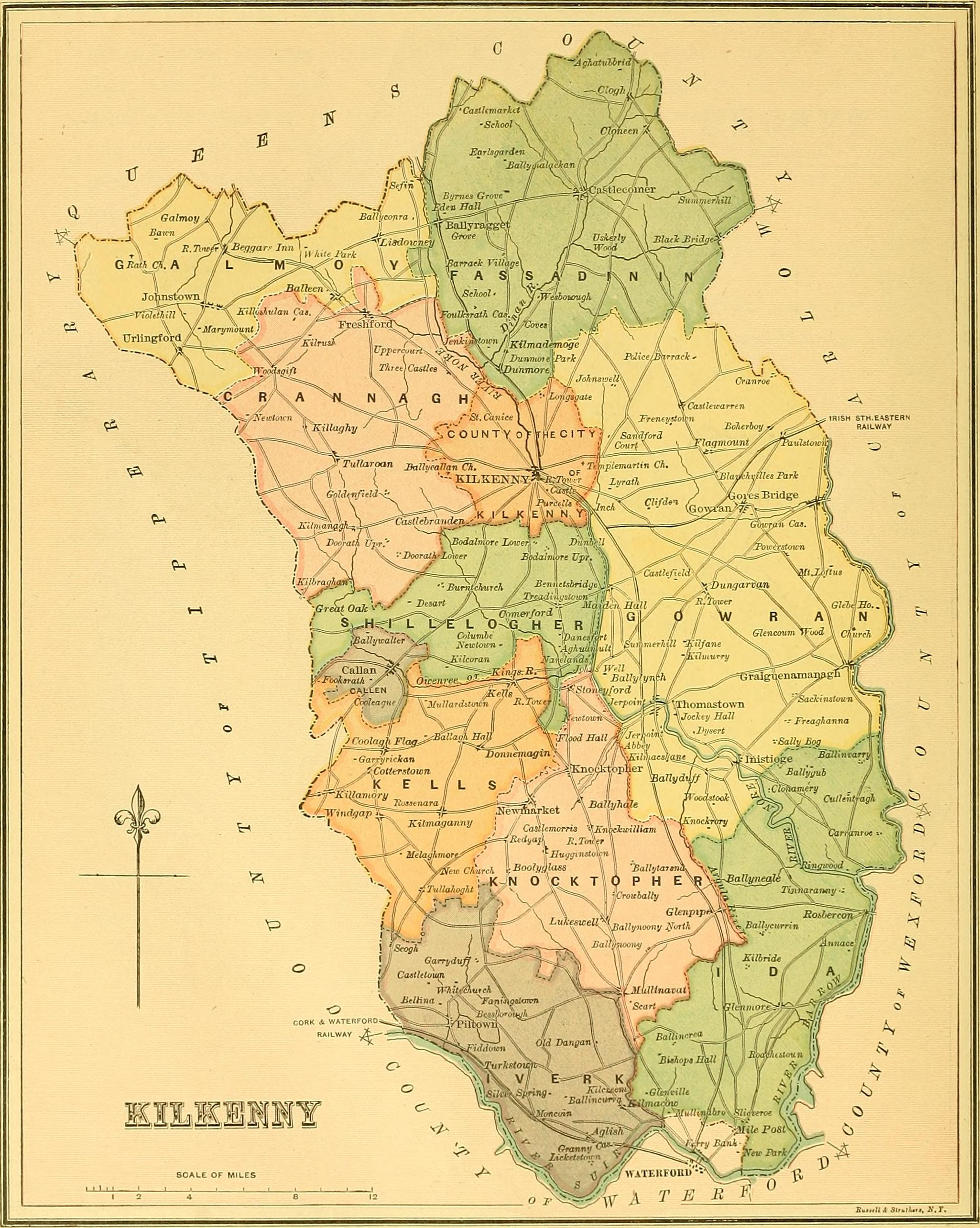
- Map of Ida

- Location in Ireland
- Coordinates: 52°22′50″N 7°2′16″W
- Country: Ireland
- Province: Leinster
- County: County Kilkenny
- Civil parishes: List: Ballygurrim; Clonamery; Dunkitt; Dysartmoon; Gaulskill; Jerpointwest; Kilbride; Kilcoan; Kilcolumb; Kilmakevoge; Listerlin; Rathpatrick; Rosbercon; Rossinan; The Rower; Shanbogh

Government
  - Type: County Council
  - Body: Kilkenny County Council

Area
  - Total: 249.8 km^{2} (96.4 sq mi)

Ida (Irish: Uí Dheá) is a barony in the south-east of County Kilkenny, Ireland. Ida is made up of 16 civil parishes containing 191 townlands, it is one of 12 baronies in the County. The barony is 249.8 square kilometres (96.4 sq mi) in size, with highest point at Tory Hill. The chief town is Slieveroe. The N25 crosses the barony.

Ida lies at the south-east of the county, with the barony of Gowran to the north (whose chief town is Gowran), Iverk and Knocktopher to the west (whose chief towns are Piltown and Knocktopher), and the barony of Kilculliheen to the south. County Waterford is located to the east of the barony.

== Etymology ==
The earliest reference to "Ida" as the barony was in 1587 where it was described as the barony of "Igrinn and Ida". The name Ida is derived the name of the ancient sept, "Ui Deaghaigh" now O'Dea in English. It has had many spellings including "Odawe Odaw", "Odaygh", "Hidaa", "Oda", "Odda", "Idagh", "Idea", and by 1839, the "Barony of Ida". Ida was recorded in the Down Survey (1656) as "Ida Igrin Ibercon" and on Griffith's Valuation (1864) as "Ida".

== History ==
The area was in the south-east of the ancient kingdom of Osraige (Ossory), referred to as "Comor na tri uisge", "the district of the three waters", possibly referring to the area where the rivers Barrow and Suir meet. Before the arrival of the Normans the three Osraige tribal lands were Ida, Igrinn and Iberchon. The Ossorian clans included "Ua nDeaghaidh" (O'Dea) of "Uí Dheaghaidh" (Ida), "Ua Braonáin" (O'Brennan) of "Uí Duach" (Idough), and "Ua Caollaidhe" (O'Kealy, O'Coely, Quealy) of "Uí Bercháin" (Ibercon).

"Ui-Bearrchon of the yellow mantle -
King of that terriroty is O'Caelluidhe,
Plain of a tribe, who return heavily,
The land over the bright-flowing Barrow."

— O'Heerin Topographical Poem (1420)

Previously known as the barony of Iberchon, and in ancient taxation it was known as the Deanery of Obargon or O'Bercon. The early Anglo-Norman records of "Overk in Ossory" included the present day baronies of Iverk and Ida, and the southern extremity of the barony of Knocktopher. This was probably the same area as "Desceart Osraige" ("South Osraige").

In the early 1170s Richard de Clare (Strongbow) granted the cantred, or barony, of Overk (Iverk) to Milo fitz David (or fitz Bishop), (the son of David FitzGerald, Archdeacon of Cardigan and Bishop of St David's). Milo's descendants were barons of Overk for nearly the next 150 years.

In the 18th century the county contained the baronies of Ida, Igrin, and Ibercon. By the 19th century these were restructured into the barony of Ida. While baronies continue to be officially defined units, they are no longer used for many administrative purposes. Their official status is illustrated by Placenames Orders made since 2003, where official Irish names of baronies are listed under "Administrative units".

== Geography ==
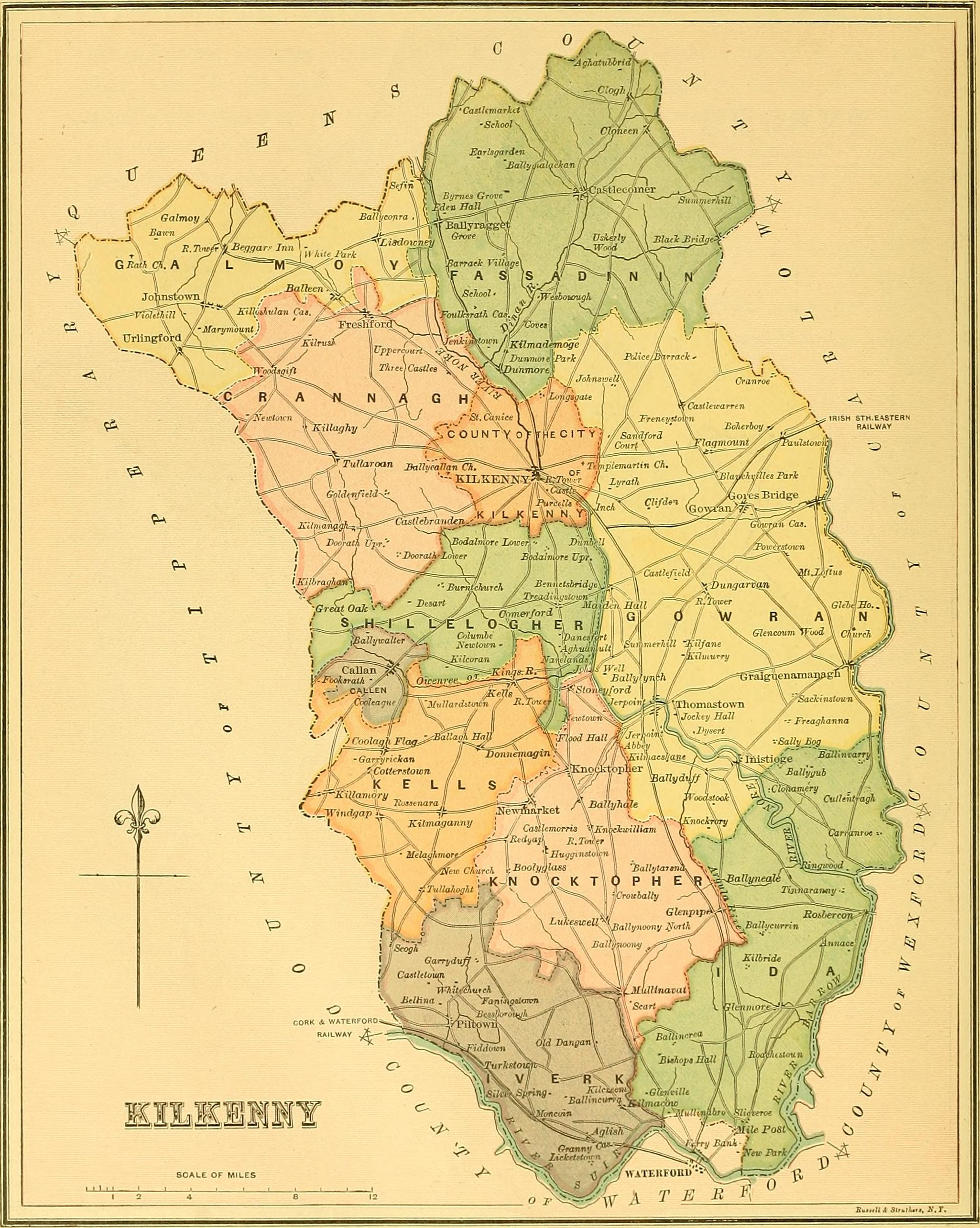
Map of County Kilkenny.

Under the administeration of Kilkenny County Council. Ida is 249.8 square kilometres (96.4 sq mi) in size and lies at the south-east of the county. With the barony of Gowran to the north, Iverk and Knocktopher to the west, and the barony of Kilculliheen to the south. Ida contains the town of Slieveroe and the population centres of Glenmore, The Rower and Tullagher. Ida contains the civil parishes of Ballygurrim, Clonamery, Dunkitt, Dysartmoon, Gaulskill, Jerpointwest, Kilbride, Kilcoan, Kilcolumb, Kilmakevoge, Listerlin, Rathpatrick, Rosbercon, Rossinan, The Rower, and Shanbogh.

Lough Cullen and the River Nore are in Ida. It also contains Moondice bog, Tory Hill, The Pink Point, and Garraunbaun Rock.

Part of the Roman Catholic Church diocese of Ossory and the Church of Ireland diocese of Cashel and Ossory.

Today, the county of Kilkenny is subdivided into 12 baronies. These include Kilkenny in the centre of the county, and clockwise from north of the county, Fassadinin, Gowran, Ida, Kilculliheen, Iverk, Knocktopher, Kells, Callan, Shillelogher, Crannagh, Galmoy.

== See also ==
- Barony (county division)
- Barony (Ireland)
- List of baronies of Ireland
- List of townlands of County Kilkenny
