= Limerick Forest Rally =

- Category: Rally
- Inaugural season: 1979
- Drivers' champion: (Republic of Ireland) Keith Power
- Co-Drivers' champion: (Republic of Ireland) Mark O'Sullivan

Irish Forest Rally Championship

South East Stages Rally Championship

Junior Rally Series

Limerick Forest Rally
- Dates: March 2021
- Frequency: Annual
- Location: County Limerick
- Country: (Republic of Ireland) Ireland
- Most recent: 2019
- Organiser: Limerick Motor Club
- Sponsor: Keltec Engineering; T Junction Cars
- Website: Website

The Limerick Forestry Rally is an annual motorsport forest rallying event held in County Limerick, Ireland. Promoted and organised by Limerick Motor Club, the rally is the second round of the Irish Forest Rally Championship, South East Stages Rally Championship and Junior Rally Series.

== History ==
The even was added to the calendar by Limerick Motor Club in late 70s, while the club's main event, Circuit of Munster ran since 1949. The event ran irregularly, with 2020 being first time that the even ran three years in a row.

== 2021 ==
COVID-19 pandemic continued into 2021, and all motorsports events remained suspended. The Irish Forest Rally Championship was by default cancelled, although no announcement was made. As the vaccinations were progressing, at the end of May Motorsport Ireland announced that motorsports events can resume from 7 June, subject to local restrictions. There was no championship, but some of the Irish Forest Rally event dates were announced, Limerick Forest Rally not being one of them.

== 2020 ==
The 2020 event was the second round of the Irish Forest Rally Championship, the South East States Rally Championship and the Junior Rally Series. Directed by the Clerk of the Course Anthony Nestor, very compact event route consisted of 68.3 stage kilometers and 178.5 road kilometers divided into 6 stages. This year's entry fee was €653.

Despite Storm Jorge passing over Ireland, the rally was anticipated to go ahead as scheduled. However, due to snowfall during the night before the rally the start was initially delayed, and later the event was postponed. The new proposed date was 18–19 April. On 12 March the event was postponed again in the light of the coronavirus pandemic. On 20 March, Motorsport Ireland issued a statement that all motorsport events are suspended until 1 June 2020. After the government released a road map on easing the COVID-19 restrictions on 6 May, Motorsport Ireland released a statement same day that in line with Phase 4 of this road map the suspension of all motor sports events is extended until the 20 July 2020. Rally events fall under Phase 5 of the guidelines and will not be considered until after the 10 August 2020. On 19 May Motorsport Ireland cancelled the 2020 championship. Club hoped it might still be able to run the event as non-championship, however the restrictions continued into 2021.

== 2019 ==
The event was stopped at SS2 because of "freak-blizzard" that unexpectedly hit the area. Many competitors slid off the road, until the road was blocked.

== 2018 ==
The rally was originally scheduled for the 3 March, however due to possible effects of Storm Emma the event was rescheduled to 24 March.

== Roll of Honor ==
Rally winners
Year	Full Event Name	Overall winner	Co-driver	Car
2020	Keltec Engineering Limerick Forest Rally	cancelled		
2019	Treaty Plant Hire Limerick Forest Rally	Keith Power	Mark O'Sullivan	Mitsubishi Lancer Evo IX
2018	Treaty Plant Hire Limerick Forest Rally	Josh Moffett	Stephen Thornton	Ford Fiesta R5
2016	Lyons of Limerick Forest Rally	Josh Moffett	Emmet Sherry	Ford Fiesta R5
2013	West Limerick Forest Rally	Philip Morrow	Jonny Hart	Mitsubishi Lancer Evo IX
2008	Limerick Forestry Rally	Ray Breen	Craig Breen	Ford Focus RS WRC '04
2007	Tom White Memorial Forestry Rally	Kevin Lynch	David Moynihan	Ford Focus RS WRC '04
2000	Thomond Forestry Rally	D. McNeil	F. Regan	Ford Escort RS Cosworth
1998	Thomond Forestry Rally	D. Kelly	G. Shinnors	Ford Escort RS Cosworth
1982	Limerick Forestry Rally	no data		
1981	Limerick Forestry Rally	Ray Benskin		Ford Escort 1600
1979	Spring Forestry Rally	Austin McHale	Joe McGee	Ford Escort RS200
