= Kilbline Castle =

Tower house in County Kilkenny, Ireland

Coordinates: 52.575°N 7.15°W

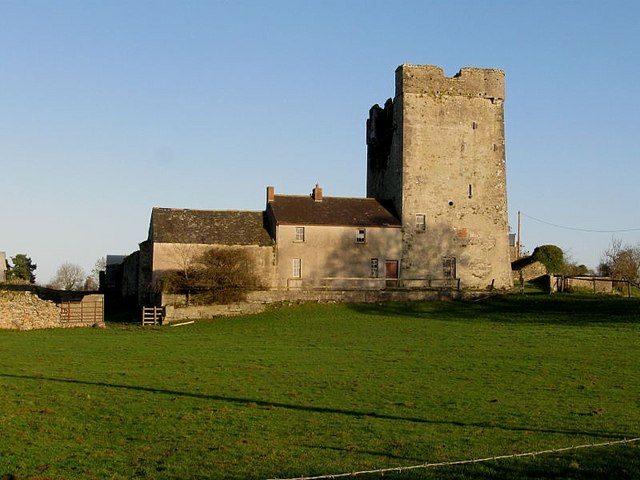
Kilbline Castle, County Kilkenny

Kilbline Castle is a fortified 16th century tower house in County Kilkenny in Ireland. It is set on the Kilbline Estate in the parish of Tullaherin, within the historical barony Gowran, approximately 1 mile southeast of Bennettsbridge. It is recorded as a protected (listed) structure by Kilkenny County Council.

The tower house was originally owned by the Comerford family. It was forfeit to the crown by Thomas Comerford in 1566 "on his attainder for rebellion". By the early 18th century, the castle was in the possession of the Candler family, ancestors of Coca-Cola founder Asa Griggs Candler. It was later occupied by members of the Ryan family "for several generations", before passing to the Lannon/Lennon family in 1969. It remains in private ownership.

Attached to the castle is a later two-story house, with a larger and more modern house in the grounds. It is roofed, with a low, two-storey, three-bay house with narrow windows and simple doorcase added. In the tower is a chimney-piece dated 1580 and a panelled room. Beside the house are early brick walls with blank arches.

== Timeline ==
- 1566 - Kilbline Castle forfeited by Thomas Comerford of Ballymac in 1566. [O’Kelly]
- 1651 - Peter Shortall, Kilblane [I Wills]
- 1662 - Peter Shortall, Kilblayn. [Oss Wills]
- 1668 - Walter Forstall, Kilbride [? Kilbline] [Oss Wills]
- 1684 - Mary Milbanke of Kilblein, Kilkenny, wid. & Walt. Milbanke her son [Cornwall R O]
- 12.10.1774 - Interest of Rev Henry Candler in lands of Kibline to be sold re debt due to Sir John Blunden. [FLJ Copy at Hunting]
- 19.10.1774 - Candler announcing he has paid debt and not for sale. [FLJ copied]
- 01.11.1797 - Died, on Saturday last, at Kilbline, Mrs Walsh, relict of the late Mr Edward Walsh of Tullow in this county, farmer. [FLJ]
- 1840 - Auction of farm equipment and furniture at Kilbline for Admins of late Patrick Purcell. [29.8.1840 Jnl]
- 04.05.1853 - Joseph Purcell, Kilbline. [KJnl]
- 1876 - Catherine Ryan, Kilbline. [Will]
- 1969 – unknown - Lannon/Lennon family home. [O’Kelly]
- Since 2024 - Privately owned but vacant. The current owner engaged CANICE architects in a conservation management plan. The intent is to make repairs and restore it as a family residence.
