= Kilmacow =

Kilmacow Irish: Cill Mhic Bhúith
- Village
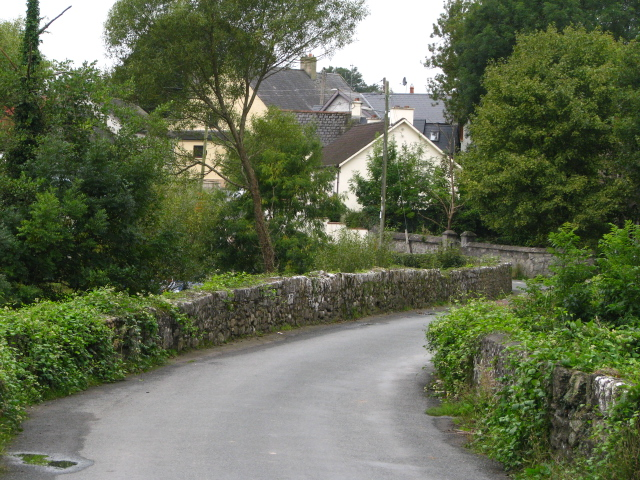
- Road bridge in Kilmacow

- Location in Ireland
- Coordinates: 52°18′51″N 7°10′36″W
- Country: Ireland
- Province: Leinster
- County: County Kilkenny

Population (2016)
  - Total: 647
- Time zone: UTC+0 (WET)
  - Summer (DST): UTC-1 (IST (WEST))

Kilmacow (Irish: Cill Mochua, meaning 'Mochua's church' — otherwise known in Irish as Cill Mhic Bhúith) is a small village and civil parish in County Kilkenny, Ireland. The townland of Kilmacow is south of the village.

== Geography ==
Situated about 7 km (4 mi) south of Mullinavat and 8 km (5 mi) north from Waterford City, Kilmacow consists of an Upper and Lower Village approximately 1 km (0.6 mi) apart. The population of each of the villages is approximately 650. The Blackwater river runs through both the Upper and Lower Villages.

== Public transport ==
Bus Éireann route 365 from Thomastown to Waterford via Knocktopher serves the village on Thursdays only allowing passengers an opportunity to travel into Waterford for a few hours. The bus stops at the community centre.

== Amenities ==
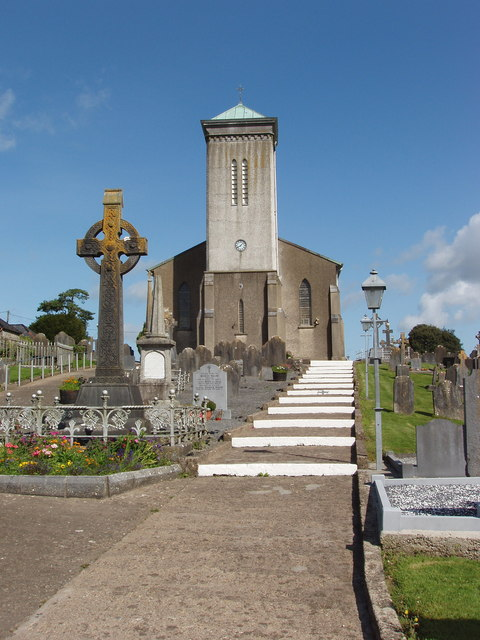
St Senan's church, Kilmacow

Kilmacow has three primary schools: a mixed school at Strangsmills, a boys' school in Dangan, and a girls' school in the upper village. The boys and girls schools have now joined with junior infants to second class now in what was the boys' school and third to sixth class now in what was the girls' school.

Kilmacow youth club has re-opened in recent years providing a place where young people can meet and participate in a variety of activities.

== Sport ==
Kilmacow has a hurling team which competes in the Junior Hurling Championship. However, they have failed to win the championship since 1956. Kilmacow also has a soccer team and a camogie club ranging from under-8s to juniors.

== Twin towns ==
Kilmacow is twinned with the village of Saint-Thurien (Brittany) in France.

== See also ==
- List of towns and villages in Ireland
