= R704 road (Ireland) =

Road in Ireland

R704 road
- Bóthar R704
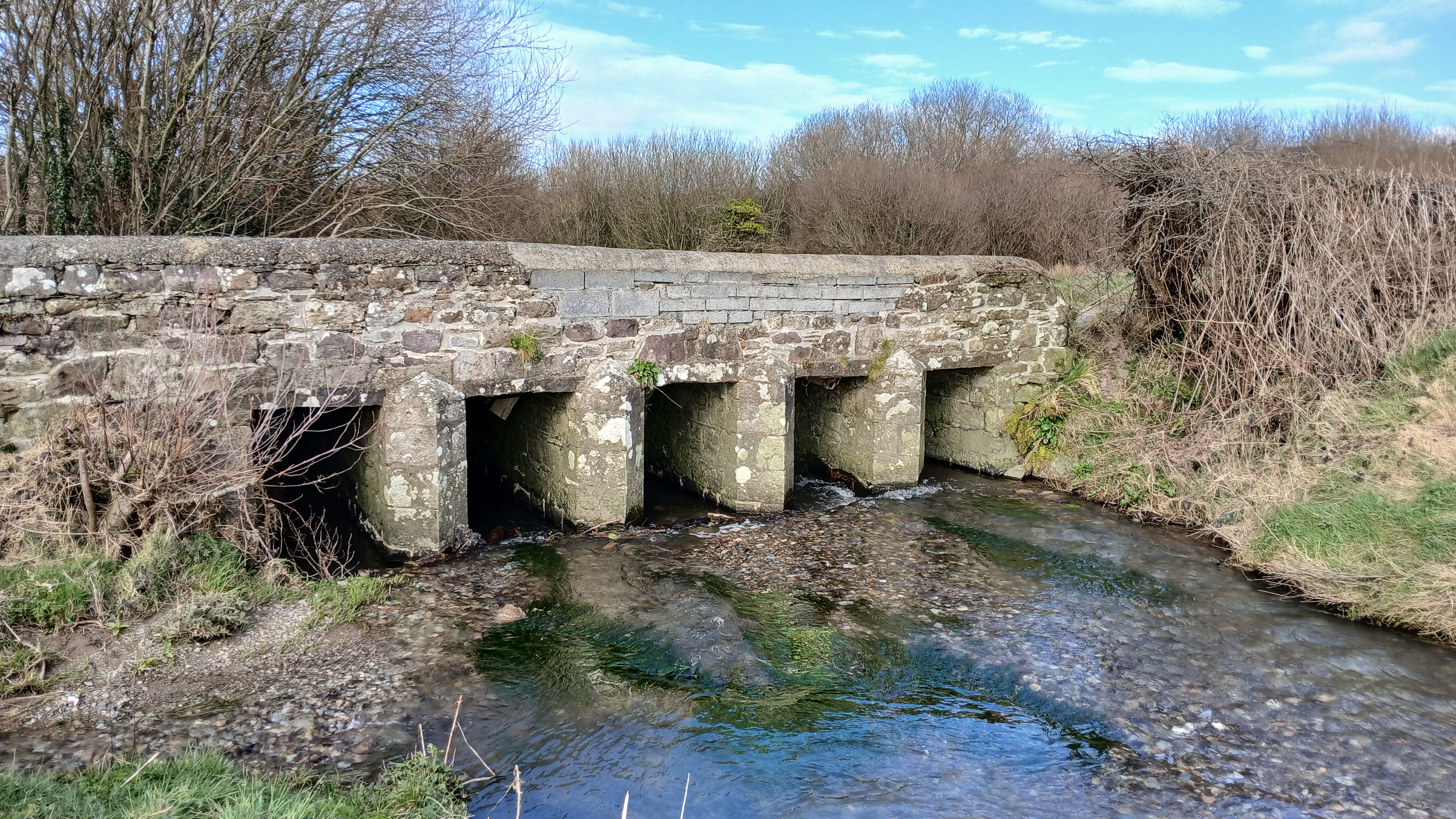
- The Listerlin bridge on the R704

Route information
- Length: 17.6 km (10.9 mi)

Major junctions
- From: R448 at Mullinavat, County Kilkenny
- M9 at Garrandarragh; Enter County Wexford
- To: R723 at Rosbercon, New Ross, County Wexford

Location
- Country: Ireland

Highway system
- Roads in Ireland; Motorways; Primary; Secondary; Regional
← R703	→ R705

The R704 road is a regional road in counties Kilkenny and Wexford in Ireland. It travels from Mullinavat, County Kilkenny to New Ross, County Wexford. The road is 17.6 kilometres (10.9 mi) long.

It passes through the villages of Listerlin and Rosbercon. It ends at the Port of New Ross in Rosbercon.
