= Gowran (barony) =

Barony in County Kilkenny, Ireland

Gowran Gabhrán (Irish) Barony of Gabhrán
- Barony
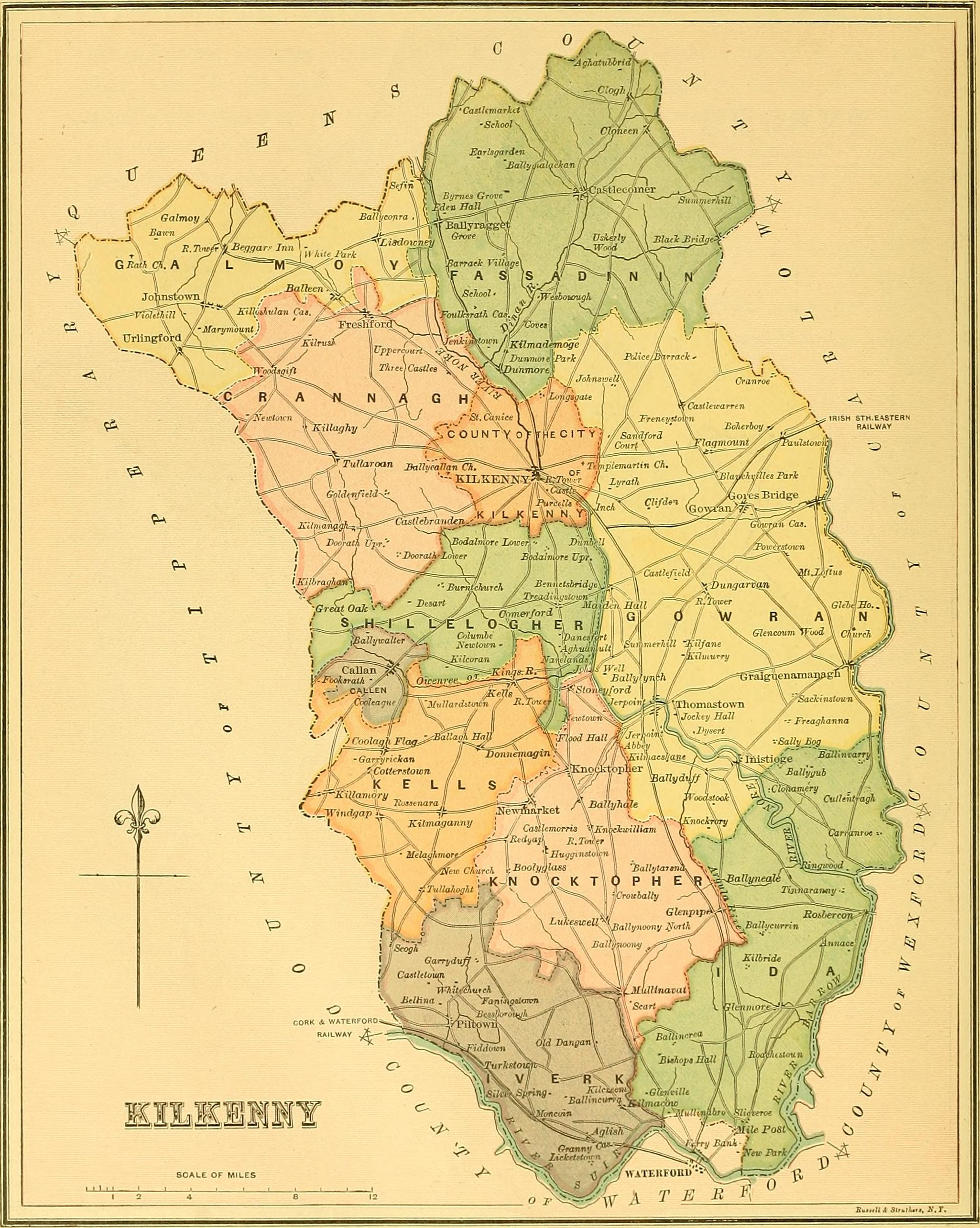
- Map of Gowran

- Location in Ireland
- Coordinates: 52°35′50″N 7°5′0″W
- Country: Ireland
- Province: Leinster
- County: County Kilkenny
- Civil parishes: List: Ballylinch; Blackrath; Blanchvilleskill; Clara; Columbkille; Dunbell; Dungarvan; Famma; Gowran; Graiguenamanagh; Grangesilvia; Inistioge; Jerpoint Abbey; Jerpoint West; Kilderry; Kilfane; Kilkieran; Killarney; Kilmacahill; Kilmadum; Mothell; Pleberstown; Rathcoole; Shankill; St. Martin's; Thomastown; Tiscoffin; Treadingstown; Tullaherin; Ullard; Wells; Woolengrange

Government
  - Type: County Council
  - Body: Kilkenny County Council

Area
  - Total: 430.5 km^{2} (166.2 sq mi)

Gowran (/ˈɡoʊrən/; Irish: Gabhrán) is a barony in the east of County Kilkenny, Ireland. The size of the barony is 430.5 square kilometres (166.2 sq mi). There are 35 civil parishes in Gowran. The chief town today is Gowran. The barony contains the ecclesiastical sites of Kilfane and Duiske Abbey The barony of Gowran is situated in the east of the county between the baronies of Fassadinin to the north (whose chief town is Castlecomer), the baronies of Kilkenny, Shillelogher and Knocktopher to the west (whose chief towns are Kilkenny, Bennettsbridge and Knocktopher), and the barony of Ida is to the south. It borders County Carlow to the east. The M9 motorway bisects the barony.

== Geography ==
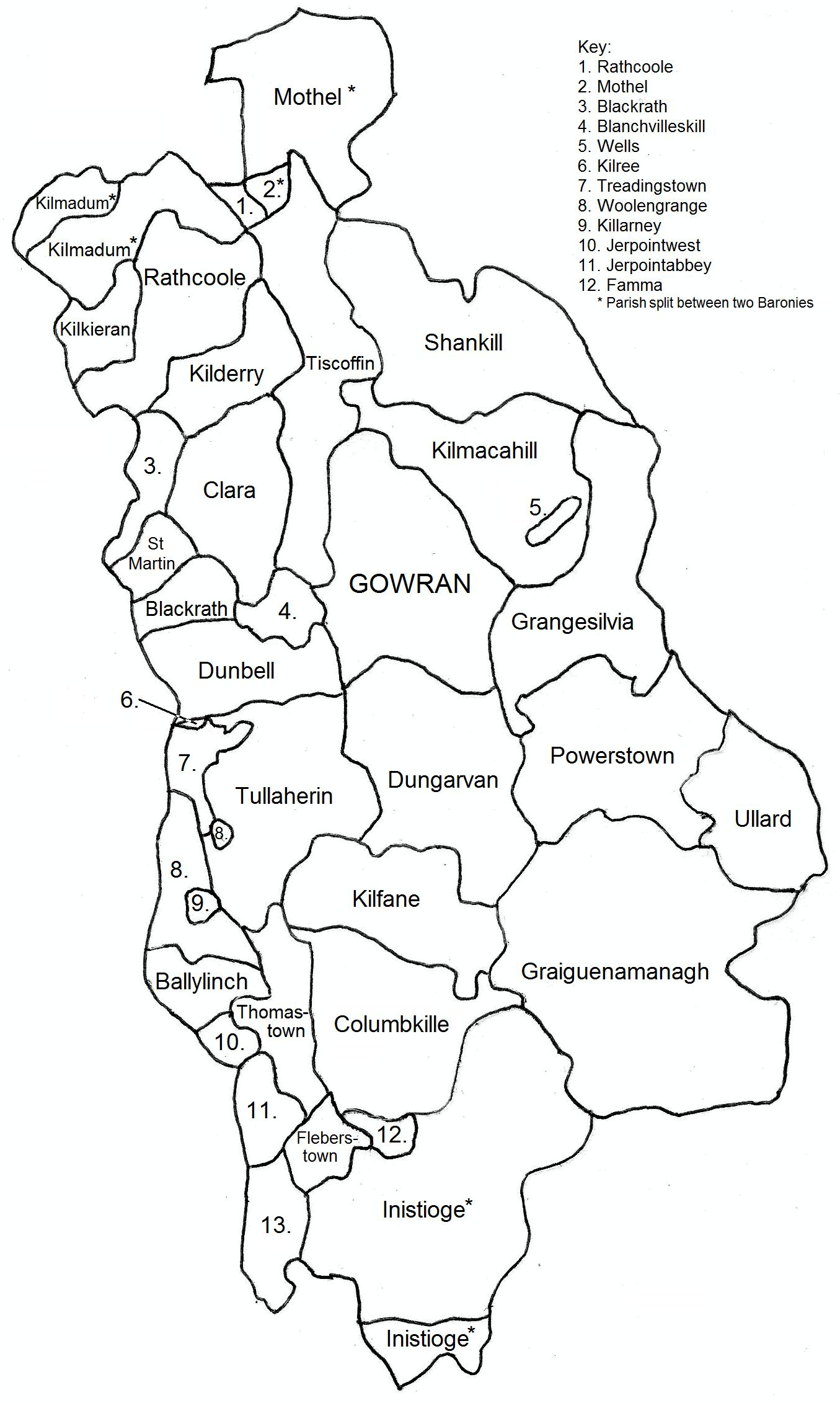
Civil parishes of Gowran

Gowran contains the towns of Thomastown, Paulstown, Bennettsbridge, Goresbridge, Gowran, Graiguenamanagh, and Inistioge, and the settlements of Ballyfoyle, Maddockstown, Whitehall, Castlewarren, Dungarvan, Rathgarvan or Clifden, Skeaghvasteen, and Johnswell.

There are 35 civil parishes in the barony (see map). They are: Blackrath, Blanchvilleskill, Clara, Columbkille, Dunbell, Dungarvan, Famma, Gowran, Graiguenamanagh, Grangesilvia, Inistioge, Jerpointabbey, Jerpointwest, Kilderry, Kilfane, Kilkieran, Killarney, Kilmacahill, Kilmadum, Mothell, Pleberstown, Powerstown, Rathcoole, Shankill, St. John's, St. Martin's, St. Maul's, Thomastown, Tiscoffin, Treadingstown, Tullaherin, Ullard, Wells, and Woolengrange. Three of which are split between the Barony of Gowran and the Baronies of Fassadinin and Ida (Mothell, Kilmadum and Inistioge). Most of the eastern boundary of the barony of Gowran is formed by the River Barrow.

== History ==
The barony was part of the territory of the historic kingdom of Osraige (Ossory). That kingdom was almost co-terminus with the still extant Catholic diocese of Ossory . In the Church of Ireland, the diocese has been merged into the diocese of Cashel and Ossory. Gowran is currently administered by Kilkenny County Council. Gowran was recorded in the Down Survey (1656), and on Griffith's Valuation (1864). Parts of the barony were in the Poor law unions of Castlecomer, Kilkenny, and Thomastown.

Territory of O'Carroll and O'Dunphy. Given to Theobald Fitzwalter (Butler ). Dobbyn family based there in the 15th century. Richard FitzPatrick was created Lord Gowran in 1715, and his son was created Earl of Upper Ossory in 1751. Both titles became extinct in 1818.

The barony contains the ecclesiastical sites of Kilfane and Duiske Abbey. Kilbline Castle and Woodstock Castle are also located in Gowran.

== See also ==
- List of baronies of Ireland
- List of townlands of County Kilkenny
