= Slieverue =

Village in County Kilkenny, Ireland

Slieverue Sliabh Rua (Irish)
- Village
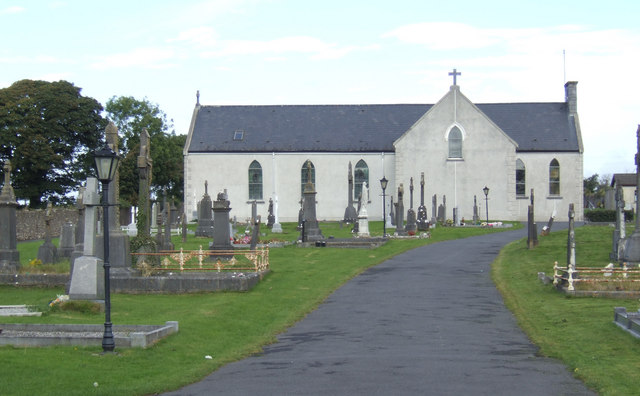
- Slieveroe Church

- Location in Ireland
- Coordinates: 52°17′00″N 7°04′05″W
- Country: Ireland
- Province: Leinster
- County: County Kilkenny

Population (2016)
  - Total: 476

Slieverue, officially Slieveroe, (Irish: Sliabh Rua, meaning 'red mountain') is a village in South County Kilkenny, Ireland. It is located in the historical barony of Ida. Despite the name, the land is relatively low-lying and fertile. Slieverue's population, as of the 2016 census, was 476.

== Geography ==
The village lies alongside the main N25 road, some 5 km from Waterford City and 14 km from New Ross in County Wexford, near the point where the Rivers Barrow and Suir come together.

== Landmarks ==
A prominent local hill, known as Carriganurra, features a large concrete cross at its summit. This cross was erected by local residents in 1950 to celebrate the Holy Year.

The Church of the Assumption is an early nineteenth century Roman Catholic church in Slieverue village. The only church in the parish, it was renovated in the early 1990s. It is listed on the Record of Protected Structures for County Kilkenny.

Earlier churches in the area included a church at Drumdowney (built in honour of Saint Patrick), at Kilmurray crossroads (dedicated to the Blessed Virgin), at Killaspy (dedicated to the presiding bishop), and at Rathpatrick (the remains of which can still be seen).

== Education ==
There are two national schools in the parish, at Slieverue and Ringville.

== People ==
Atateemore near Slieverue is the birthplace of John O'Donovan, a scholar who translated the ancient text Annals of the Four Masters into English.

== See also ==
- List of towns and villages in Ireland
