= Mullinavat =

Town in County Kilkenny, Ireland

Mullinavat Irish: Muileann an Bhata
- Village
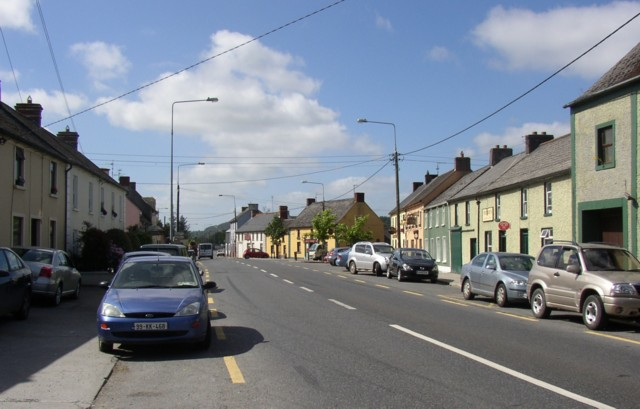
- Main Street

- Location in Ireland
- Coordinates: 52°22′05″N 7°10′17″W
- Country: Ireland
- Province: Leinster
- County: County Kilkenny

Population (2022)
  - Total: 210
- Time zone: UTC+0 (WET)
  - Summer (DST): UTC-1 (IST (WEST))

Mullinavat (Irish: Muileann an Bhata, meaning 'mill of the stick') is a village in south County Kilkenny, Ireland. The village's Irish name, Muileann an Bhata, translates as 'mill of the stick' which, according to local tradition, refers to a mill which could only be approached by means of a rough stick which spanned the river close to where Mullinavat Bridge is now located.

== Geography ==
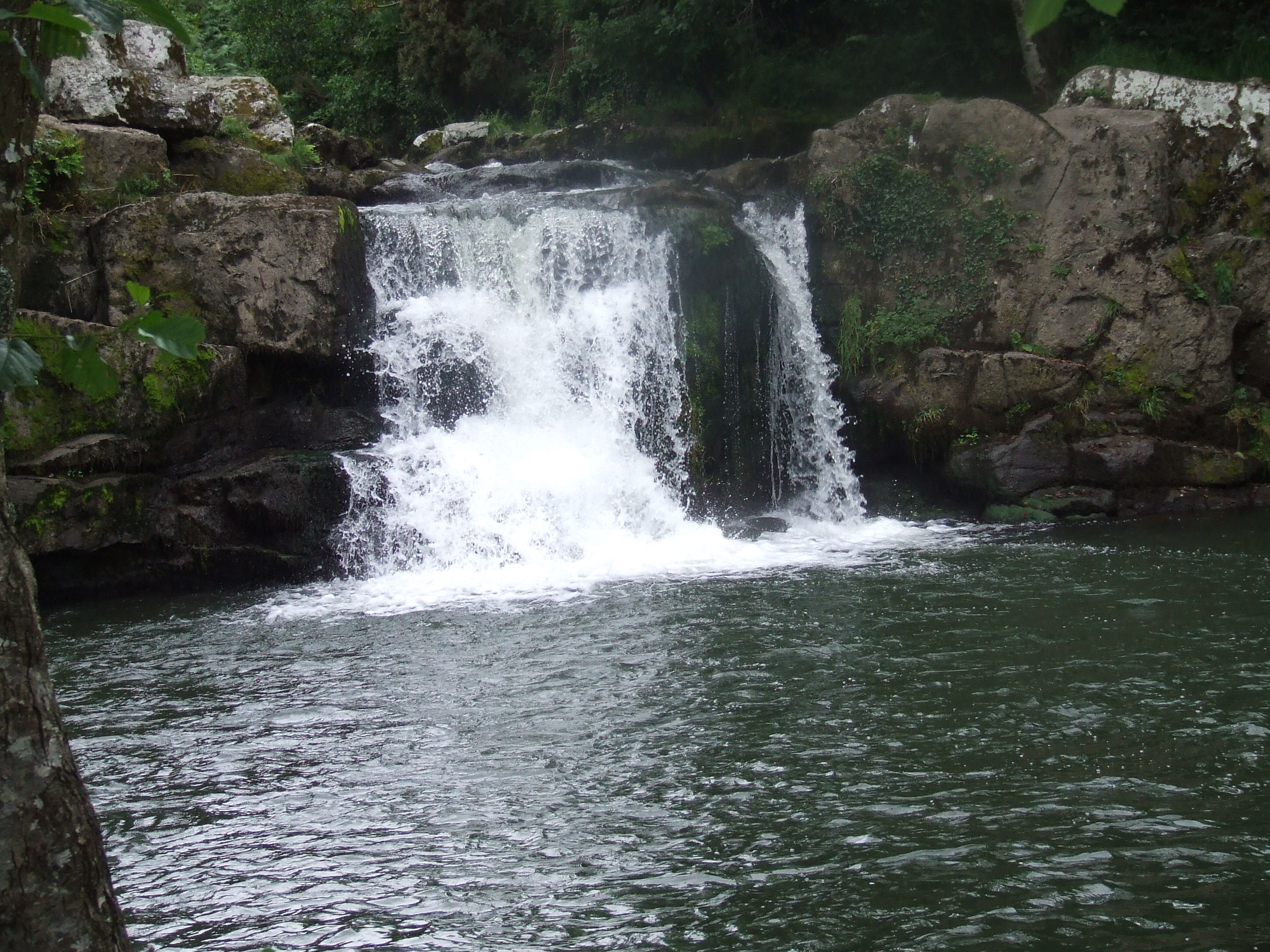
Pollanassa waterfall is approximately 2 kilometres (1.2 mi) east of Mullinavat

The village and townland of Mullinavat lie in the electoral division of Killahy, in the civil parish of Kilbeacon in the historical Barony of Knocktopher in County Kilkenny. The civil parishes of Kilahy and Rossinan are nearby. Mullinavat is approximately 12 km (7 mi) north of Waterford city.

Two small rivers, Abhainn na Bhata (Glendonnell River)and the Poulanassa River (Poul an easa), join the Blackwater River to the south of Mullinavat. Other local geographic features include Tory Hill which rises to 290 m (950 ft) above sea level. This hill is said to have derived its name from an outlaw named Edmund Den, who was active in the area around the year 1700. There is a pattern held each year on Tory Hill on the second Sunday of July. This is locally called 'Tory Hill Sunday' and 'Frocchans Sunday'. It was not previously a religious celebration, but consisted of local people gathering to pick the wild berries called 'Frocchans'. In the "holy year" of 1950, a large cross was erected on the summit of the hill, and since then, the rosary has been said by the people who gather beneath the cross.

Named after 'Fort of the Wren', nearby Listrolin is in the Walsh Mountains, overlooking Mullinavat, Mooncoin, Kilmacow and Tempelorum. Listrolin and the Walsh Mountains were acquired by the Walsh family when they landed in Ireland with Strongbow in the 12th century. This area was controlled by the family until the Cromwellian conquest of Ireland in the 17th century. It was once home to several castles owned by the family's descendants. In 1946, the townlands of Clonassy, Listrolin and Rochestown were annexed from Mooncoin, becoming part of Mullinavat district parish. The ancient church of this district stood in Listrrolin, in the laneway leading over the Assy River to Ballinacoaley.

== History ==
Evidence of ancient settlement in the area includes a number of fulacht fiadh, enclosure and ringfort sites in the surrounding townlands of Deerpark, Garrandarragh and Glendonnell.

Mullinavat (Irish: Muileann an Bhata, meaning 'mill of the stick') was historically associated with milling, and 19th century saw mill and corn mill buildings still stand on the River Blackwater in Glendonnell townland. The local church, Saint Beacon's Catholic Church in Garrandarragh, dates to c. 1890. A 19th century Church of Ireland church, outside the village, was demolished in the 20th century - though its graveyard remains. These churches, and Kilbeacon parish, are historically associated with Saint Beacon (Bécán).

Clonassey Castle is located in the area, and the remains of the foundations are to be seen in what is still known as the 'Castle Field'. Its last occupant was Robert Walsh, Member of Parliament for the County Kilkenny constituency in the Parliament of Ireland of 1689. He was killed at the siege of Limerick in 1691.

Inchicarron (or Inchacarran) Castle, to the east of Mullinavat, was occupied by poet John Mac Walter Walsh (also known as 'Tatter Jack Walsh'). While only one of his poems survives, a dance tune (jib) is still known as 'Tatter Jack Walsh'. His property was confiscated in his old age. He died in 1660 and was reputedly buried in Kilbeacon cemetery.

== Transport ==
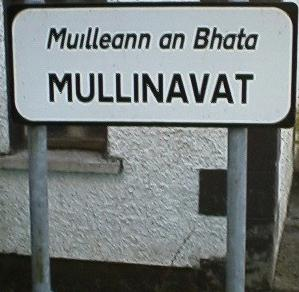
Bilingual signage approaching Mullinavat

The area is served by Bus Éireann routes 73 (Waterford to Athlone) and 365 (Waterford to Carlow).Until May 2026, it was served by the Route 4 Waterford to Dublin Airport Expressway bus.

Mullinavat is located on the R448 Naas–Waterford road. The village was bypassed in July 2010 when the Kilkenny–Waterford section of the M9 motorway opened. It is at junction 11 of the motorway. The R704 road goes to New Ross.

Although the Dublin–Waterford railway line runs through the area, there is no longer a station. Mullinavat railway station opened in May 1853 and closed in early 1963. Now disused and in a state of disrepair, Mullinavat station is included on the Record of Protected Structures maintained by Kilkenny County Council.

== Sport ==
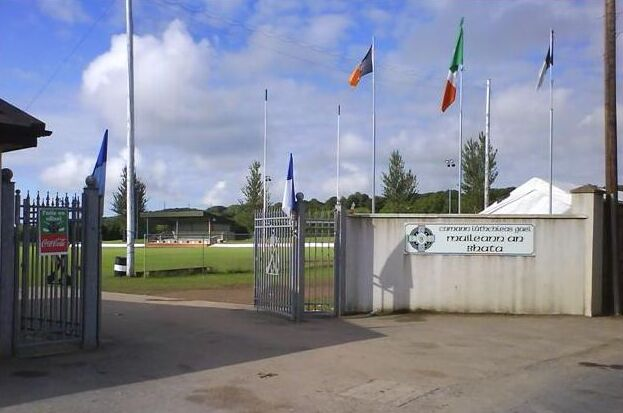
Mullinavat GAA grounds

The local Gaelic Athletic Association (GAA) club, Mullinavat GAA club, was formed in 1887. Gaelic football was the dominant sport in the parish until around 1913 when a hurling team from Mullinavat entered the Junior championship for the first time. The club won the Leinster Intermediate Club Hurling Championship in 2014.

== Amenities and economy ==
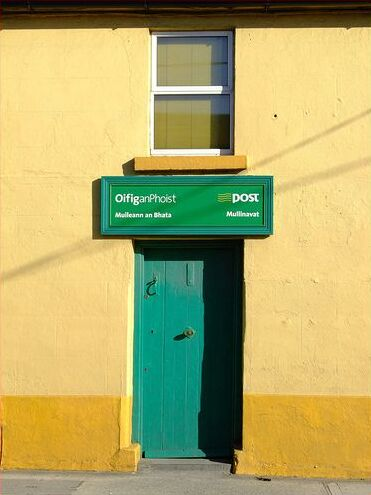
Mullinavat's post office closed in 2018

There are two national (primary) schools serving the area: St. Beacon's National School in Mullinavat village and St. Colmcille's National School in Bigwood. The nearest secondary school is in Ballyhale.

Amenities and businesses include a health centre, shop, restaurants, GAA grounds, and several public houses. There is also a Teagasc office in the area.

Mulinavat is in an area of productive land, which is used for both agriculture and forestry.. Dairy and cattle farming are most common. Milk is supplied to Tírlán in Belview, County Kilkenny. There is also some tillage, with some barley, wheat, oats and potatoes grown in the area. Production of sugar beet stopped with the closure of the Carlow sugar plant.

Afforestation in the area has been undertaken by Coillte. Forestry has been important in Mullinavat since the 1960s, mainly conifer plantations. Government policy has also promoted the development of some deciduous woodlands.

== Demographics ==
Historical population
Year	Pop.	±%
1986	306	—
1991	283	−7.5%
1996	275	−2.8%
2002	309	+12.4%
2006	255	−17.5%
2011	259	+1.6%
2016	233	−10.0%
2022	210	−9.9%

Between the 2002 census and 2016 census, the population of Mullinavat decreased from 309 to 233. As of the 2022 census, it had a population of 210. Of these, over 95% (200 people) were Irish citizens, 2% (5 people) were from the United Kingdom, with a small number (3 people) holding citizenship of other European countries. As of the 2022 census, nearly 91% of respondents indicated that they were Catholic, with 1% other religions and 8% either of no religion or no stated religion.

== See also ==
- List of towns and villages in Ireland
