= Castlewarren =

Castlewarren Caisleán an Bhairínigh
- Village
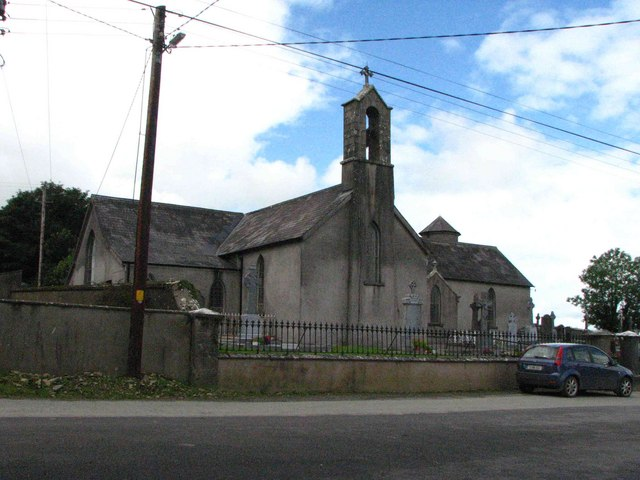
- Castlewarren Church

- Location in Ireland
- Coordinates: 52°41′43″N 7°06′30″W
- Country: Ireland
- Province: Leinster
- County: County Kilkenny
- Elevation: 200 m (660 ft)
- Time zone: UTC+0 (WET)
  - Summer (DST): UTC-1 (IST (WEST))

Castlewarren (Irish: Caisleán an Bhairínigh), previously known as Buile (pronounced "Boula"), is a small village in County Kilkenny, Ireland, located some 4 kilometres (2.5 mi) north of the N10 national primary road at Flagmount. The castle site, from which Castlewarren takes its name, is on top of a ridge 200 metres (660 ft) above sea level.

== St. Scuithin's ==
The Catholic church in the village is dedicated to St.Scuithin. There was an old kiln where the church now stands; the people used to build a makeshift altar in the kiln where mass was celebrated. As time went on they began to build small shelters to protect the women of the congregation during inclement weather. The present church was built in 1829 in the shape of a cross. Castlewarren is a sub-parish of Clara, County Kilkenny.

== See also ==
- List of towns and villages in Ireland
