= Fiddown =

Village in County Kilkenny, Ireland

Fiddown Fiodh Dúin (Irish)
- Village
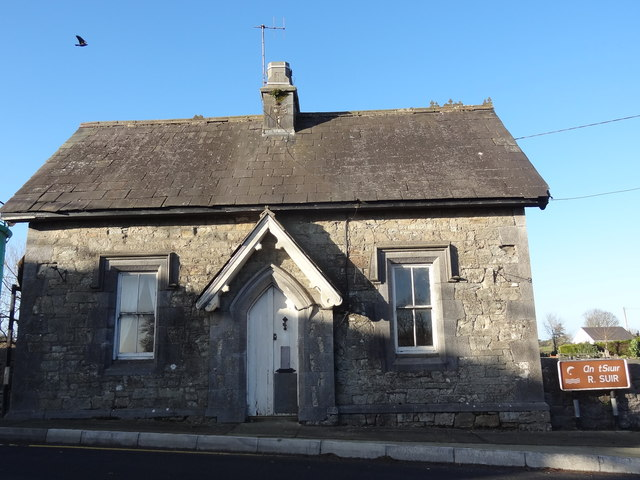
- An old "toll house" at Fiddown (on the Kilkenny side of the bridge over the Suir)

- Location in Ireland
- Coordinates: 52°19′49″N 7°18′51″W
- Country: Ireland
- Province: Leinster
- County: Kilkenny
- Elevation: 11 m (36 ft)

Population (2016)
  - Total: 369
- Time zone: UTC+0 (WET)
  - Summer (DST): UTC-1 (IST (WEST))
- Irish Grid Reference: S467200

Fiddown (Irish: Fiodh Dúin, meaning 'wood of the fort') is a small village in County Kilkenny, Ireland. It is located in the south of the county, just off the N24 road, 37 km (23 mi) south of Kilkenny city. The village is on the banks of the River Suir, near the border with County Waterford to which the village is connected via the Fiddown Bridge. Carrick-on-Suir is 7 km to the west, and Waterford city is 16 km to the east. The village is in a townland and civil parish of the same name.

Fiddown was the site of a 6th-century monastery, associated with the monk Maidoc or Momodoc, which was located near the river crossing.

Fiddown Island nearby is a nature reserve in the River Suir.

== See also ==
- List of towns and villages in Ireland
