= Cranagh (barony) =

Barony in County Kilkenny, Ireland

Cranagh Crannach (Irish) Barony of Cranagh
- Barony
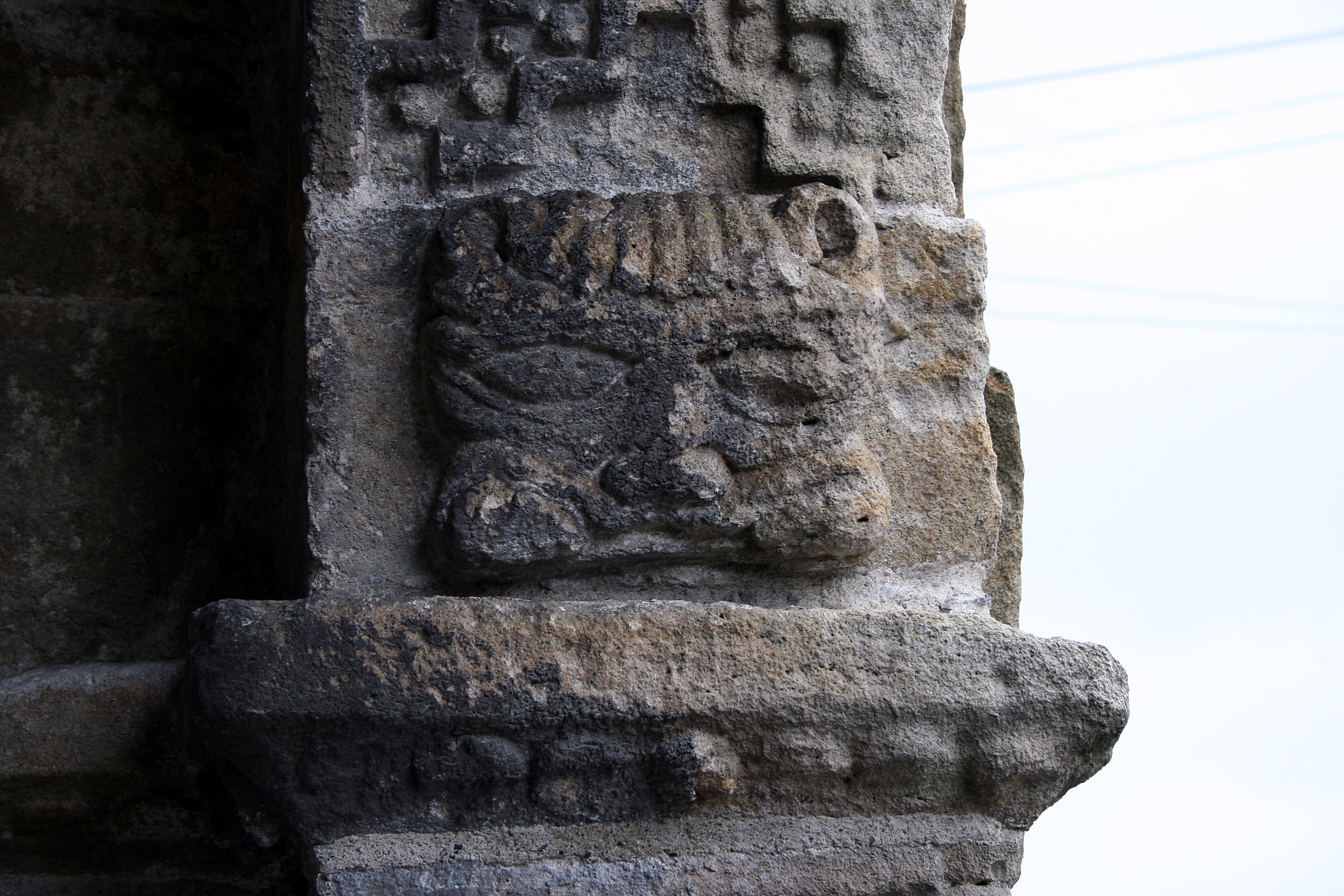
- A detail from the portal of St. Lachtain's Church.
- Etymology: Abounding in Trees, or Woodland
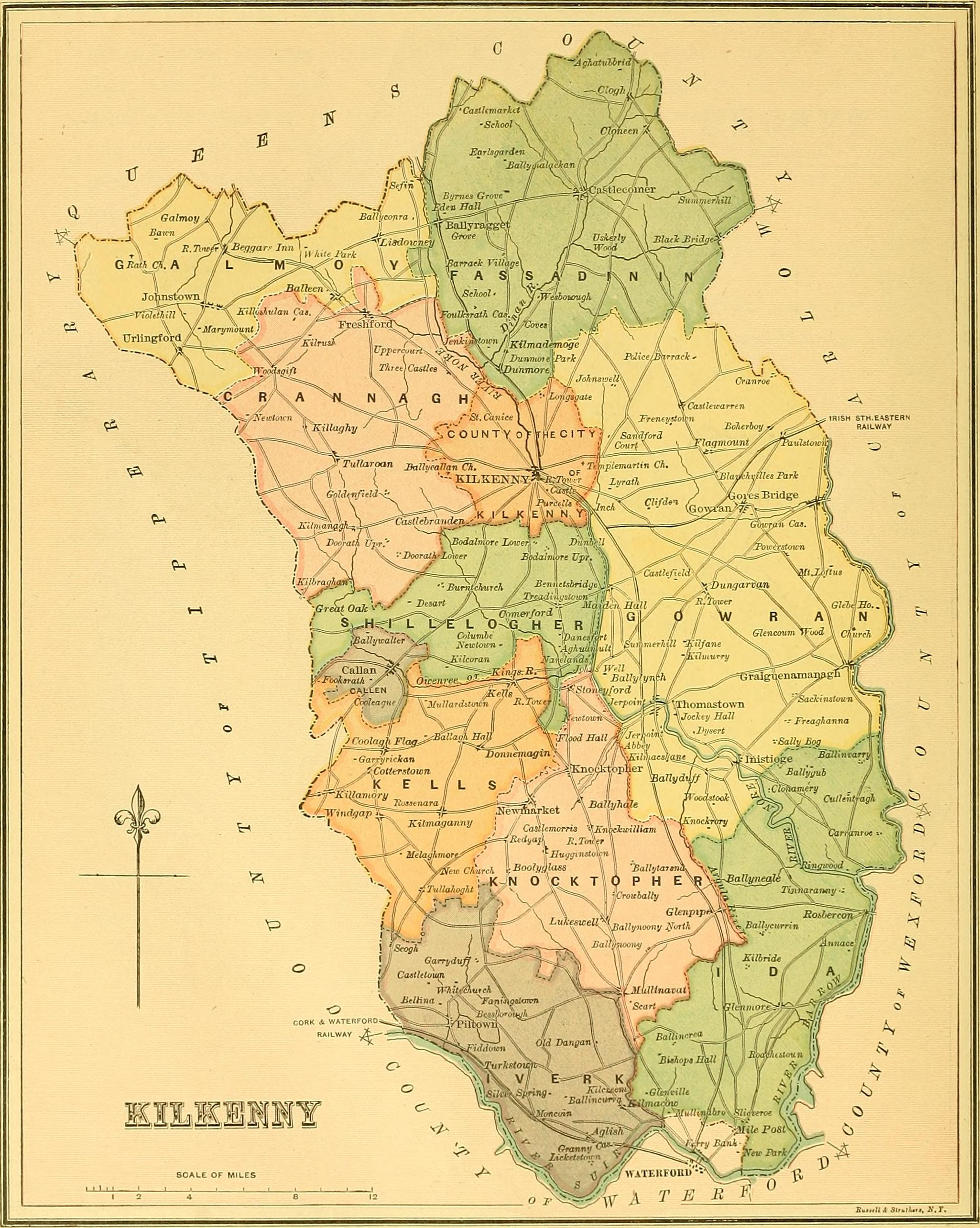
- Map of Cranagh

- Location in Ireland
- Coordinates: 52°40′35″N 7°25′26″W
- Country: Ireland
- Province: Leinster
- County: County Kilkenny
- Civil parishes: List: Ballinamara; Ballycallan; Ballylarkin; Clashacrow; Clomantagh; Coolcraheen; Fertagh; Freshford; Garranamanagh; Kilcooly; Killahy; Killaloe; Kilmanagh; Odagh; Sheffin; Tubbridbritain; Tullaghanbrogue; Tullaroan

Government
  - Type: County Council
  - Body: Kilkenny County Council

Area
  - Total: 210.8 km^{2} (81.4 sq mi)

Crannagh (Irish: Crannach, meaning 'Abounding in Trees, or Woodland'), sometimes written Cranagh or Granagh, is a barony in the north western part of County Kilkenny, Ireland. It is one of 12 baronies in County Kilkenny. The size of the barony is 210.8 square kilometres (81.4 sq mi). There are 19 civil parishes in Crannagh, made up of 182 townlands. The chief town Freshford, with highest point at Clomantagh Hill. Crannagh lies at the north west of the county, with the baronies of Galmoy and Fassadinin to the north (whose chief towns are Galmoy and Castlecomer), and the barony of the Kilkenny to the east (whose chief town is Kilkenny) and Shillelogher to the south (whose chief town is Bennettsbridge). It is buffers County Tipperary on the west. The R693 road crosses the barony.

== History ==
The barony was part of in the historic kingdom of Osraige (Ossory) and the territory of the Ua Caibhdheanaigh. The name of Cranagh, in Irish Crannach, meaning "abounding in Trees or the Woodland", from "crann", a tree, and the collective termination "ach". According to O'Heerin's Topographical Poem (1420) at the time of the Norman invasion the area was the territory of the clan called the Ua Caibhdheanaigh (O'Coveney, Keveny) who were the chiefs of the plain of Magh Airbh (Moy Arve) and Clar Coill. "Magh-Narbh", or the plain of Arbh, named for Narbh, Prince of Ireland, and the son of Úgaine Mór, comprised much of the present barony. In 891 Grane Hill was mentioned in the Annals of the Four Masters "A slaughter was made of the Eóganachta at Grian-Airby, by the Osraighi".

"Over Magh-Airby, I now mention,
Is O'Caibhdeanaigh of the woody plain,
Head of every meeting is the steady chief,
At the head of Coill-O'g-Cathosaigh."

— O'Heerin Topographical Poem (1420)

Described as the "Manor of Crannagh" in 1311 in the "Calendar of Ormond deeds". The name "Barrony of Cranagh" appears for the first time in 1587 contained in a book listing "ploughlands" or "Horsemen's beds" in the county. The barony probably dates from an earlier period. In 1609 Sir John de Rocheford of Killary and George St. Leger of Woncestown (Bouncestown) were returned as Constables of the barony. Cranagh was recorded in the Down Survey (1655–1656). and on Griffith's Valuation (1864). The barony contain few megalithic remains but many raths, ruined ancient churches and Norman castles. The Graces were the feudal Barons of Courtstown, Tullaroan.

In the 18th century County Kilkenny consisted of the Liberties of Kilkenny and of Callan and the baronies of Galmoy, Lower Ossory, Fassadinig, Cranagh, Shellilogher, Gowran, Kells, Knocktopher, Ida, Igrin, Iverk and Ibercon. By the 19th century these were restructured into the baronies of Callan, Crannagh, Fassadinin, Galmoy, Gowran, Ida, Iverk, Kells, Knocktopher, and Shillelogher.

== Geography ==
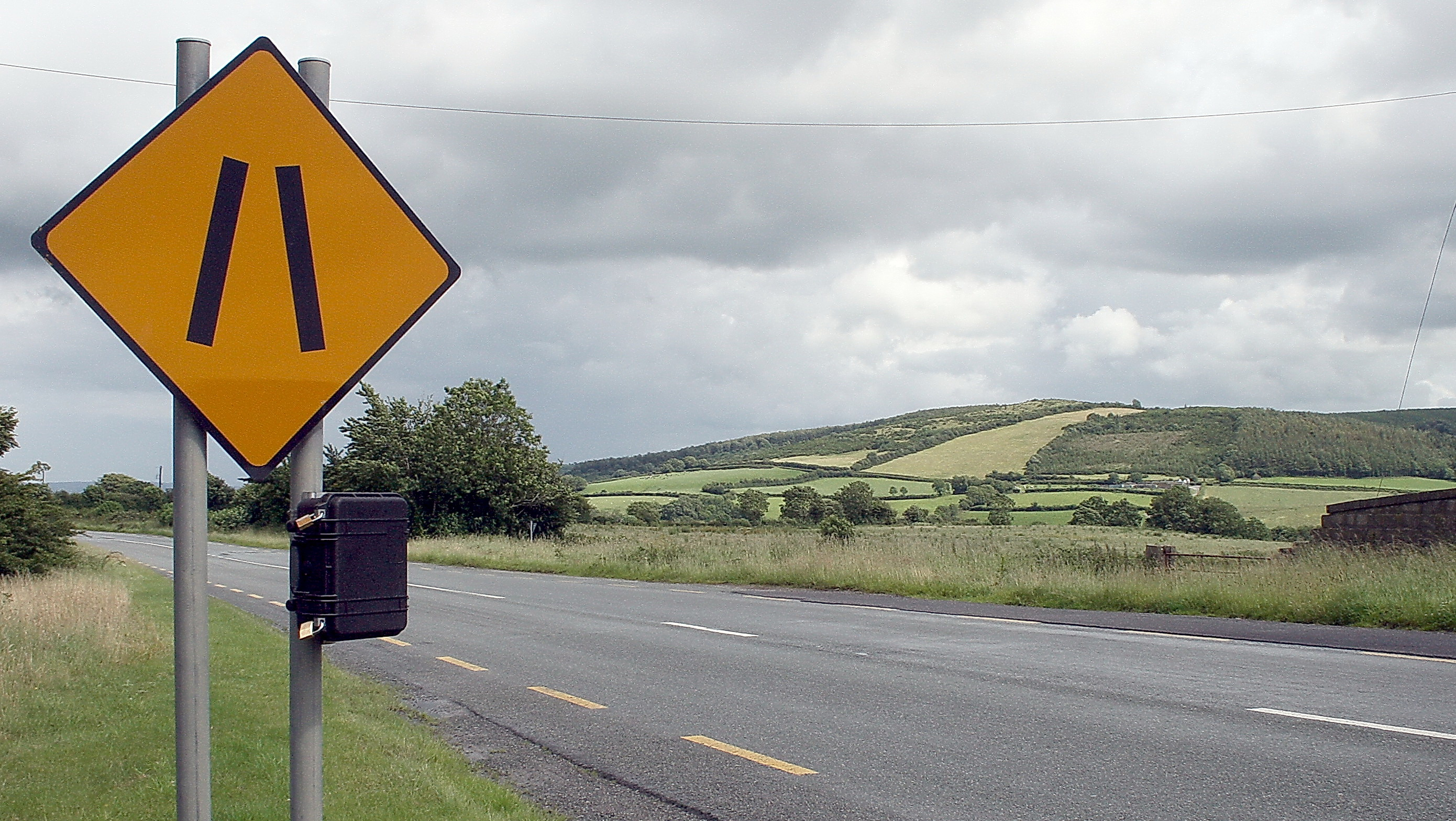
R693 at Clomantagh Hill.

The county of Kilkenny is subdivided into 12 baronies. These include Kilkenny in the centre of the county, and clockwise from north of the county, Fassadinin, Gowran, Ida, Kilculliheen, Iverk, Knocktopher, Kells, Callan, Shillelogher, Crannagh, Galmoy. Crannagh is 210.8 square kilometres (81.4 sq mi) in size and lies at the north west of the county, with the baronies of Galmoy and Fassadinin to the north, and the barony of the Kilkenny to the east and Shillelogher to the south. It extends from the valley of the Nore westwards to the border of Tipperary.

Cranagh contains the town of Freshford and the settlements of Odagh, Threecastles, Woodsgift, Kilmanagh, Kilmanagh, Lacken, Rathmoyle and Tullaroan. The baronies highest point is 349 metres (1,145 ft) at Clomantagh Hill with a sandstone rock formation resting on the central county limestone substratum. The rivers Nore is to the east and the Nuenna flows through Crannagh. There is a turlough called the Loughans which is an area of Special Conservation, and the nature reserve of Ballykeeffe Wood. Crannagh is made up of 19 civil parishes including Freshford, Odagh, Ballycallan, Ballylarkin, Ballinamara, Killahy, Kilcooly, Killaloe, Kilmanagh, Clomantagh, Coolcraheen, Fertagh, Garranamanagh, Clashacrow, St. Canice, Sheffin, Tubbridbritain, Tullaroan, and Tullaghanbrogue. Parts were in the Poor law unions of Callan, Kilkenny, and Urlingford. Today it is part of the Roman Catholic Church diocese of Ossory and the Church of Ireland diocese of Cashel and Ossory. Crannagh is currently administered by Kilkenny County Council.

== See also ==
- Barony (county division)
- Barony (Ireland)
- List of baronies of Ireland
- List of townlands of County Kilkenny
