= Galmoy (barony) =

Barony in County Kilkenny, Ireland

Galmoy Gabhalmhaigh (Irish) Barony of Galmoy
- Barony
- Etymology: plain of the Branch, or Ghabhal (River Goul)
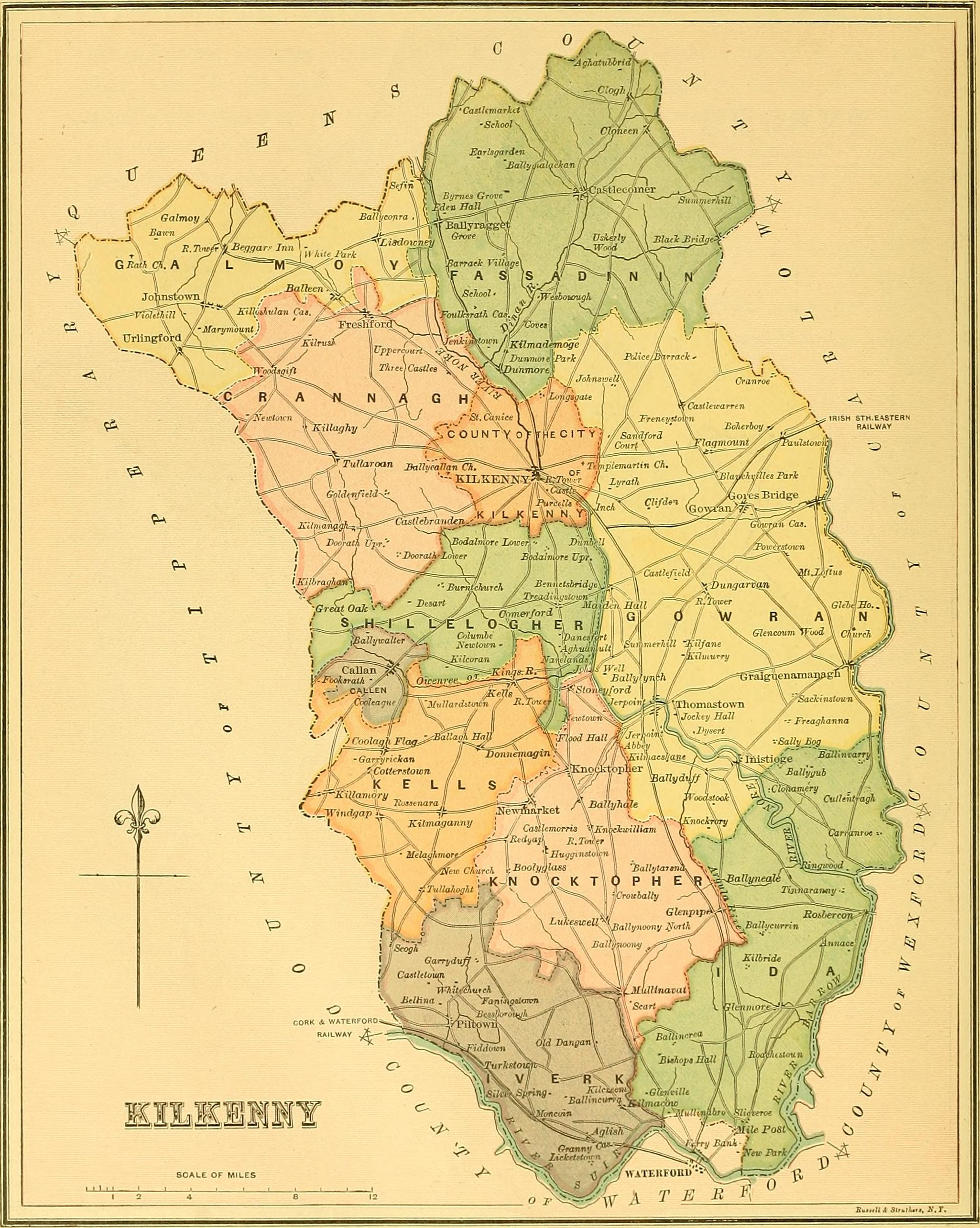
- Map of Galmoy

- Location in Ireland
- Coordinates: 52°46′6″N 7°30′57″W
- Country: Ireland
- Province: Leinster
- County: County Kilkenny
- Civil parishes: List: Erke; Aharney; Urlingford; Balleen; Borrismore; Coolcashin; Durrow; Fertagh; Glashare; Rathbeagh; Rathlogan; Sheffin

Government
  - Type: County Council
  - Body: Kilkenny County Council

Area
  - Total: 162.7 km^{2} (62.8 sq mi)

Galmoy (Irish: Gabhalmhaigh, meaning 'plain of the Ghabhal [River Goul]') is a barony in the north western part of County Kilkenny, Ireland. It is one of 12 baronies in County Kilkenny. The size of the barony is 162.7 square kilometres (62.8 sq mi). There are 12 civil parishes in Galmoy. While it is named after the village of Galmoy, today the chief town of the barony is Urlingford. Galmoy barony lies at the north-western corner of the county between Fassadinin to the east (whose chief town is Castlecomer), and Crannagh to the south (whose chief town is Freshford). It is surrounded on two sides by counties Tipperary to the west and Laois to the north. The M8 Dublin/Cork motorway bisects the barony. It is situated 121 kilometres (75 mi) from Dublin city and 131 kilometres (81 mi) from Cork city. Galmoy is currently administered by Kilkenny County Council. The barony was part of in the historic kingdom of Osraige (Ossory).

== History ==
The name of Galmoy, in Irish Gabhalmhaigh, means "plain of the Branch, or Ghabhal" (River Goul). The barony was part of in the historic kingdom of Osraige (Ossory) and was the territory of the Ua Bróithe clan. According to O'Heerin's Topographical Poem (1420) at the time of the Norman invasion the area was the territory of the clan called the Ua Bróithe (O'Brophy) of Mag Sédna.

"A fine district of beauteous nuts;
O'Broithe over free Magh Sedna."

— Ó hUidhrín, Triallam timcheall na Fodla ("Let us wander around Ireland") (1420).

In a 1247 feodary, Stephen Archid[ekne] holds 2 1/2 knights' fees in Ganelomey (also known at the time as Gauleme) in the Calendar of Patent Rolls. In the 1324 feodary, Raymond le Ercedekne, son of Richard, held the lands of Gavelmoy, in the barony of Galmoy. Galmoy was recorded in the Down Survey (1656), the 1840 Ordnance Survey Map and on Griffith's Valuation (1864).

The main landholders in the barony were the Butlers. The Viscount Galmoye peers were descended from the 10th Earl of Ormond (see Piers Butler, 3rd Viscount Galmoye). The O'Brophys and Archdeacons were based in Galmoy. It had been established by 1672.

In the 18th century County Kilkenny consisted of the Liberties of Kilkenny, and of Callan, and the baronies of Galmoy, Lower Ossory, Fassadinig, Cranagh, Shellilogher, Gowran, Kells, Knocktopher, Ida, Igrin, Iverk and Ibercon. By the 19th century these were restructured into the baronies of Callan, Crannagh, Fassadinin, Galmoy, Gowran, Ida, Iverk, Kells, Knocktopher, and Shillelogher. It was in the Poor law union of Urlingford.

== Geography ==
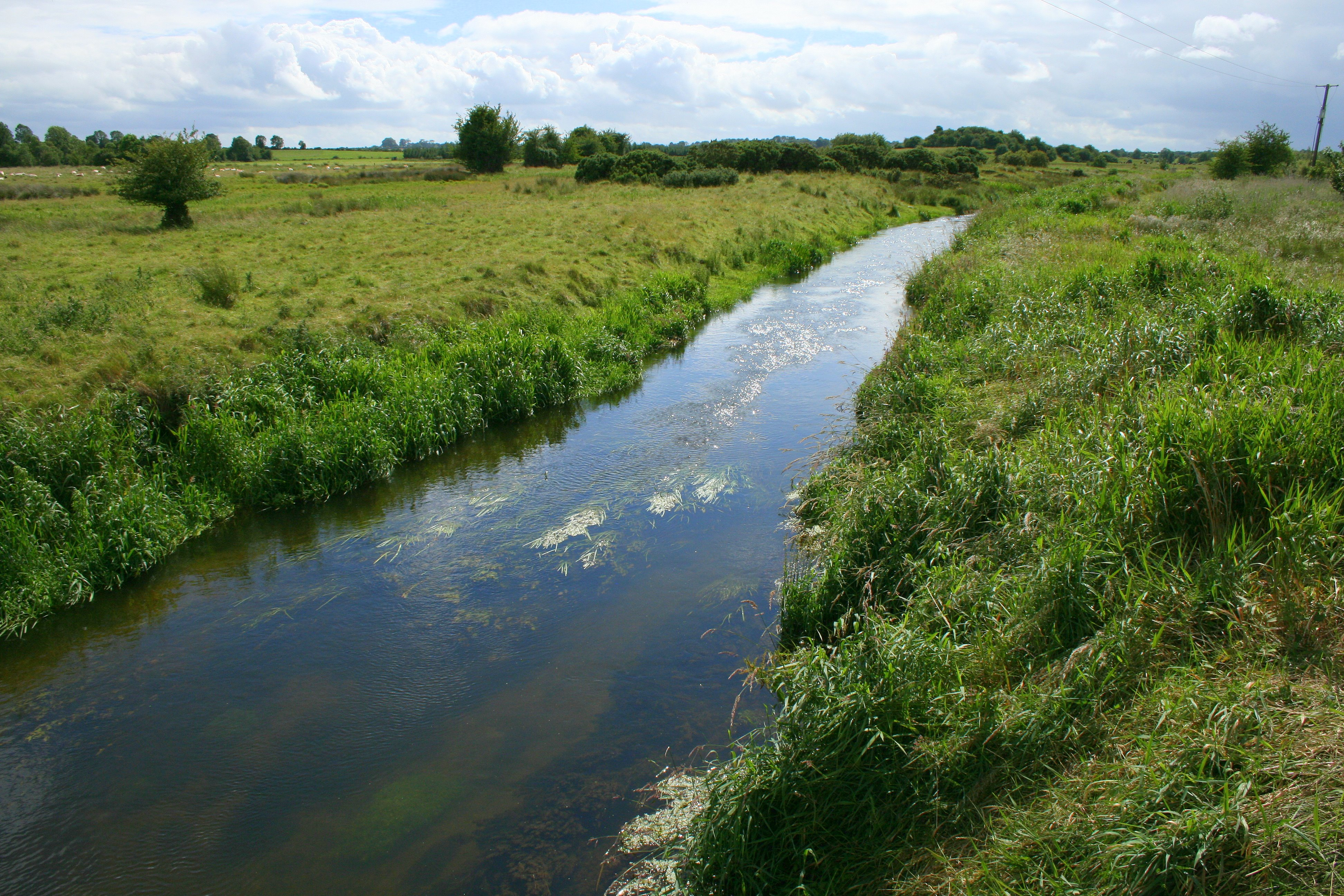
River Goul near village of Galmoy.

The county is subdivided into 12 baronies These include Kilkenny in the centre of the county, and clockwise from north of the county, Fassadinin, Gowran, Ida, Kilculliheen, Iverk, Knocktopher, Kells, Callan, Shillelogher, Crannagh, Galmoy.

Galmoy contains the towns of Urlingford, Johnstown, and Ballyragget, and the population centres of Crosspatrick, Galmoy, Gattabaun. Galmoy is made up of 12 civil parishes of Erke, Aharney, Urlingford, Balleen, Borrismore, Coolcashin, Durrow, Fertagh, Glashare, Rathbeagh, Rathlogan, and Sheffin And these include 86 townlands (See List of townlands in County Kilkenny).

Kennedys Cross and Knockmannon Cross Roads are crossroads located in Galmoy. Today it is part of the Roman Catholic Church diocese of Ossory and the Church of Ireland diocese of Cashel and Ossory.

== Legal context ==
Baronies were created after the Norman invasion of Ireland as subdivisions of counties and were used for administration. While baronies continue to be officially defined units, they have been administratively obsolete since 1898. However, they continue to be used in land registration and specification such as in planning permissions. In many cases, a barony corresponds to an earlier Gaelic túath which had submitted to the Crown.

== See also ==
- Barony (county division)
- Barony (Ireland)
- List of baronies of Ireland
- List of townlands of County Kilkenny
- List of Irish Local Government Areas 1900 - 1921
