= Galmoy =

Galmoy may refer to:

- Galmoy, County Kilkenny, village in Ireland
- Galmoy (barony), administrative barony centred on the village
- Galmoy Mine, mine near the village
- Viscount Galmoy, title in the Peerage of Ireland

== See also ==
- Galmoy Hurdle, Irish National Hunt horserace run at Gowran Park
- Galmo Williams, Premier of the Turks and Caicos Islands in 2009
