= Callan (barony) =

Barony in County Kilkenny, Ireland

Callan Callainn (Irish) Barony of Callan
- Barony
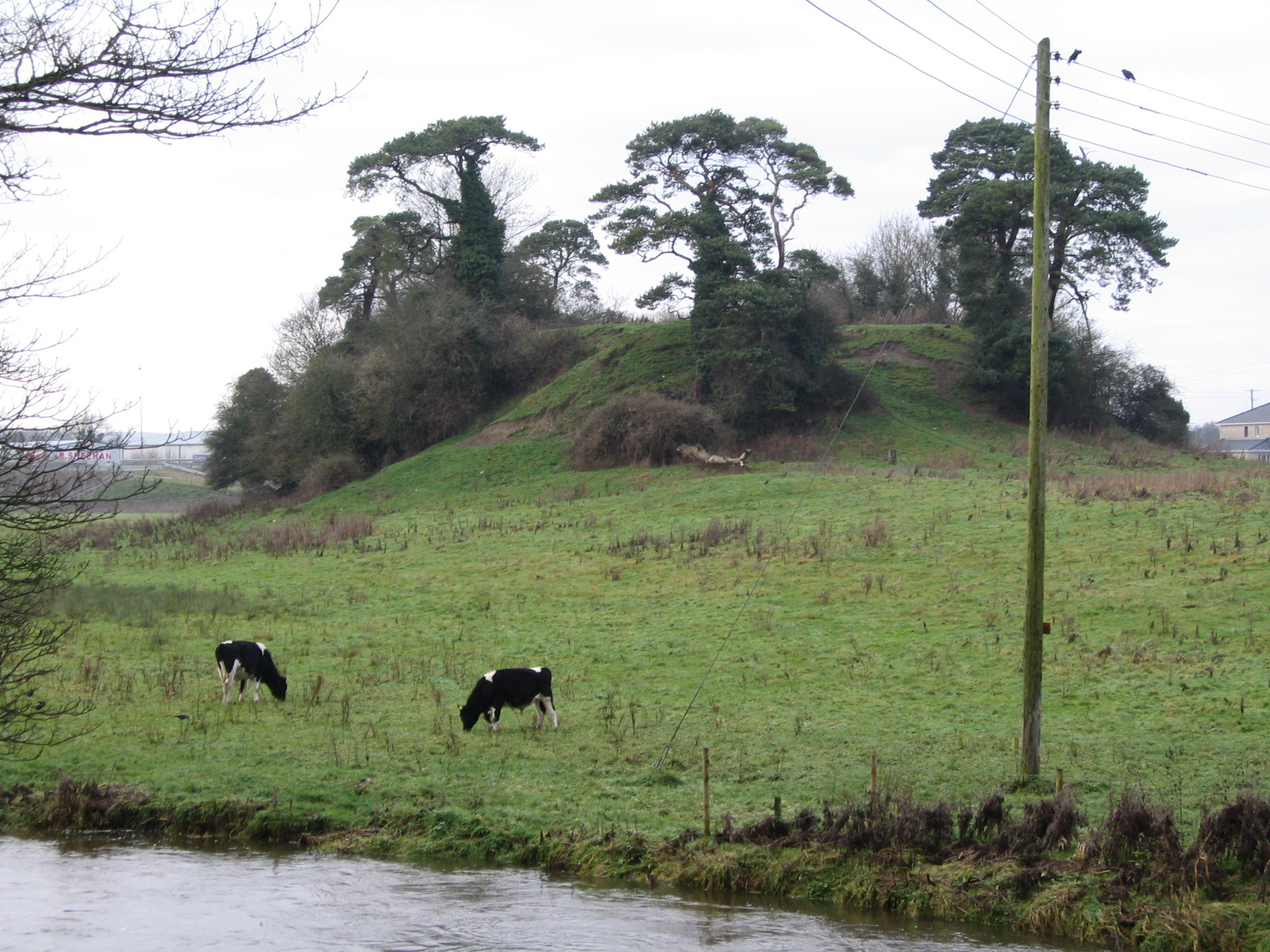
- Callan Motte in Callan.
- Etymology: Callow land
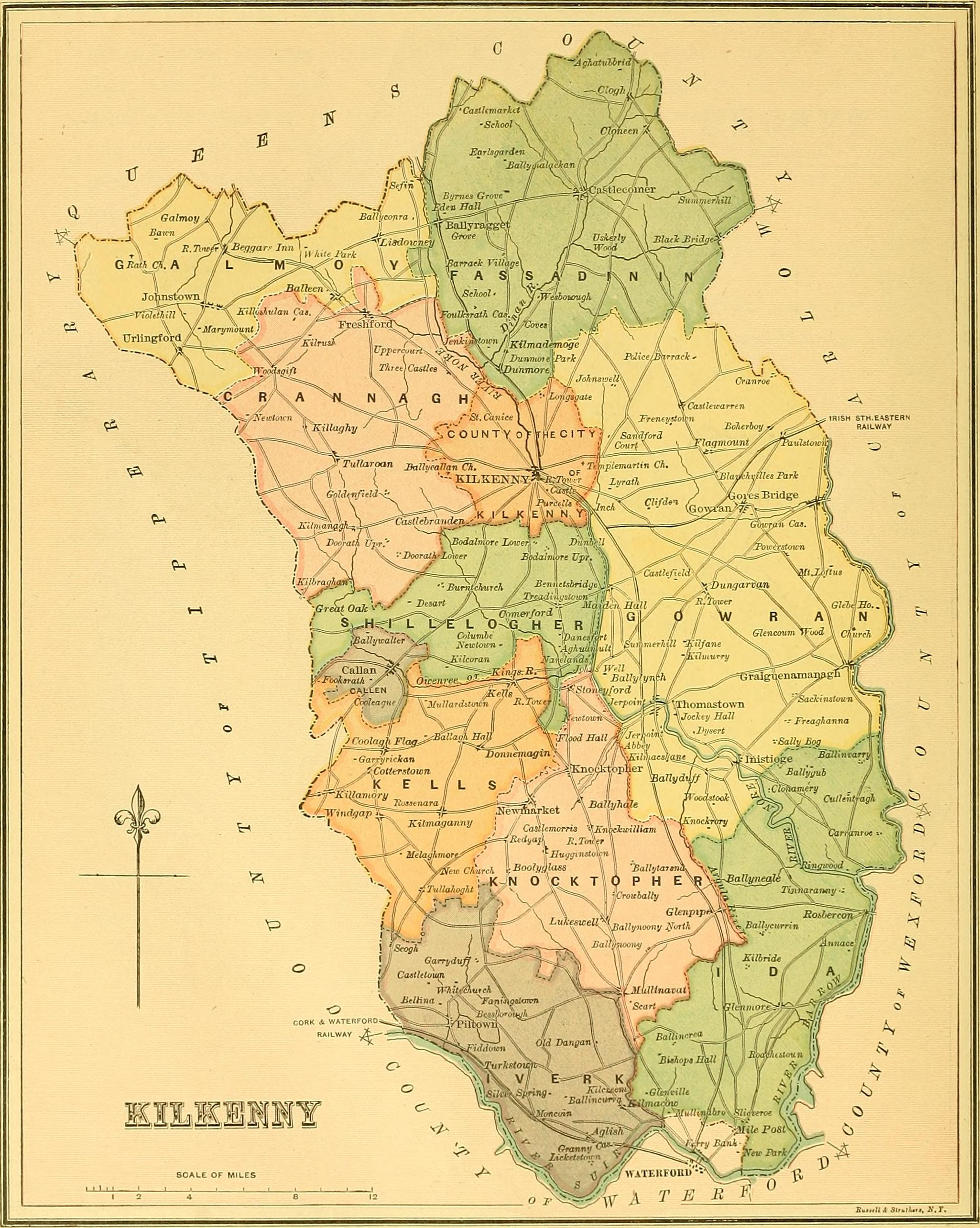
- Barony of Callan

- Location in Ireland
- Coordinates: 52°32′50″N 7°24′6″W
- Country: Ireland
- Province: Leinster
- County: County Kilkenny
- Town of Callan: 1217
- Founded by: William Marshal, 1st Earl of Pembroke
- Civil parishes: List: Callan; Killaloe

Government
  - Type: County Council
  - Body: Kilkenny County Council

Area
  - Total: 22.9 km^{2} (8.8 sq mi)

The barony of Callan (Irish: Callainn, meaning 'Callow land') is a barony in the west of County Kilkenny, Ireland. The barony is 22.9 square kilometres (8.8 sq mi) in size. It is one of 12 baronies in County Kilkenny. Unusually for a barony, it contains only two civil parishes which together comprise 65 townlands. The chief town is Callan. The barony is bordered by the baronies of Shillelogher to the north (whose chief town is Bennettsbridge) and by Kells to the south (whose chief town is Kells). The N76 road bisects the barony. Notable features include Callan Motte and Callan Augustinian Friary.

Callan was an early medieval cantred within the shire of Kilkenny, and part of the historic kingdom of Osraige (Ossory). Today it is part of the Roman Catholic Church diocese of Ossory and the Church of Ireland diocese of Cashel and Ossory. Callan is currently administered by Kilkenny County Council.

== Etymology ==
The barony, town, and liberties, of Callan, take their name from the river Callainn, now the King's River. The name in Irish, Callainn (pronounce Colling), comes from the Irish cala or caladh meaning, "callow land", and this refers to long coarse grass which grew in summer along the river bank after being waterlogged all winter.

== History ==
The barony was part of in the historic Gaelic kingdom of Osraige (Ossory) and the territory of the Ua Glóiairn clan of Callann. According to O'Heerin's Topographical Poem (1420) at the time of the Norman invasion the area was the territory of the clan called the Ua Glóiairn of Callann. The Ó Glóiairn (O'Gloran) were chiefs of Callainn, the area of the "cantred of O'Glóiairn", lying on both sides of the King's River. This later became the "Liberties of Callan".

"O'Gloiairn, the fruit branch has got,
A cantred of a sweet country,
A smooth land along the beauteous Callainn,
A land without a particle of blemish."

— O'Heerin Topographical Poem (1420)

Callan town and the surrounding area were a cantred in the 13th century, and the area was often included in the barony of Kells or Shillelogher. The town of Callan received a charter from William Marshal, 1st Earl of Pembroke in 1217. In the Down Survey (1656) it was called "Callan Liberties", however, the 1836 Act explicitly states the town and liberties of Callan "shall be deemed and taken to be a barony". The barony was recorded the 1840 Ordnance Survey map and Griffith's Valuation (1864).

In the 18th century County Kilkenny consisted of the Liberties of Kilkenny and of Callan and the baronies of Galmoy, Lower Ossory, Fassadinig, Cranagh, Shellilogher, Gowran, Kells, Knocktopher, Ida, Igrin, Iverk and Ibercon. By the 19th century these were restructured into the baronies of Callan, Crannagh, Fassadinin, Galmoy, Gowran, Ida, Iverk, Kells, Knocktopher, and Shillelogher.

== Geography ==
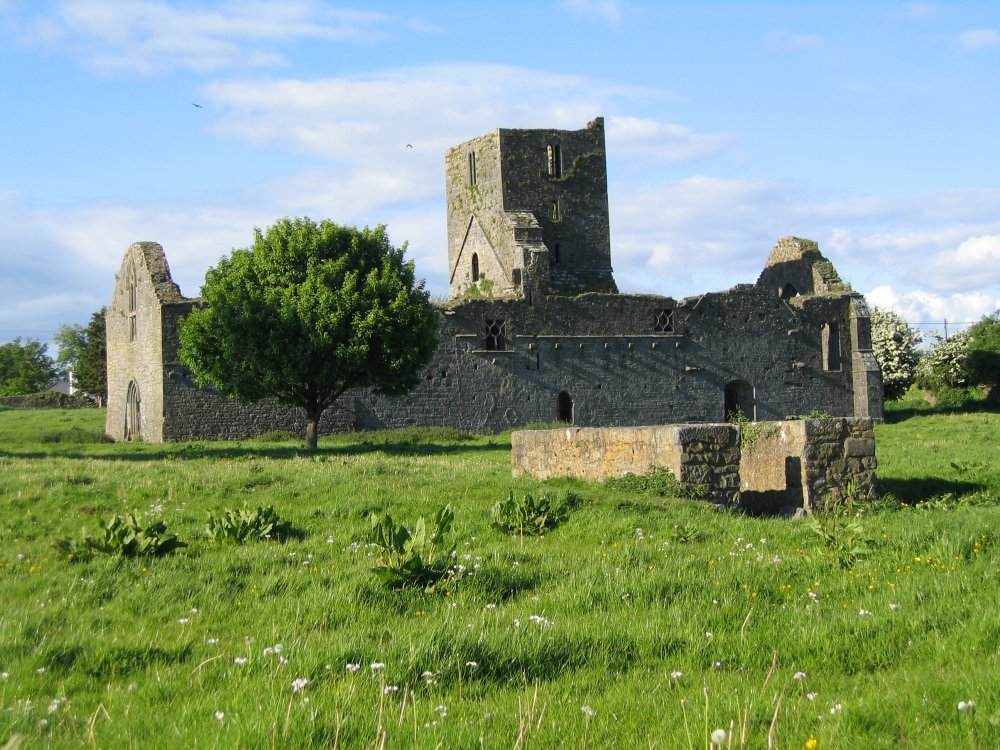
Callan Augustinian Friary in Callan.

Today, the county of Kilkenny is subdivided into 12 baronies. These include Kilkenny in the centre of the county, and clockwise from north of the county, Fassadinin, Gowran, Ida, Kilculliheen, Iverk, Knocktopher, Kells, Callan, Shillelogher, Crannagh, Galmoy.

Callan lies to the west of the county, with the baronies of Shillelogher to the north and Kells to the south. Unusually for a barony, it contains only two civil parishes Callan and Killaloe. It is made up of 65 townlands. The Kings River flows through it, and was previously called the Callan River.

Places of interest include Callan Motte and Callan Augustinian Friary. Today it is part of the Roman Catholic Church diocese of Ossory and the Church of Ireland diocese of Cashel and Ossory. Callan is currently administered by Kilkenny County Council. A single townland of 19 acres, Gortnasragh, which is an exclave of the civil parish of Killaloe, forms the remaining civil parish of the barony.

== See also ==
- Barony (county division)
- Barony (Ireland)
- List of baronies of Ireland
- List of townlands of County Kilkenny
