= R694 road (Ireland) =

Road in Ireland

R694 road
- Bóthar R694
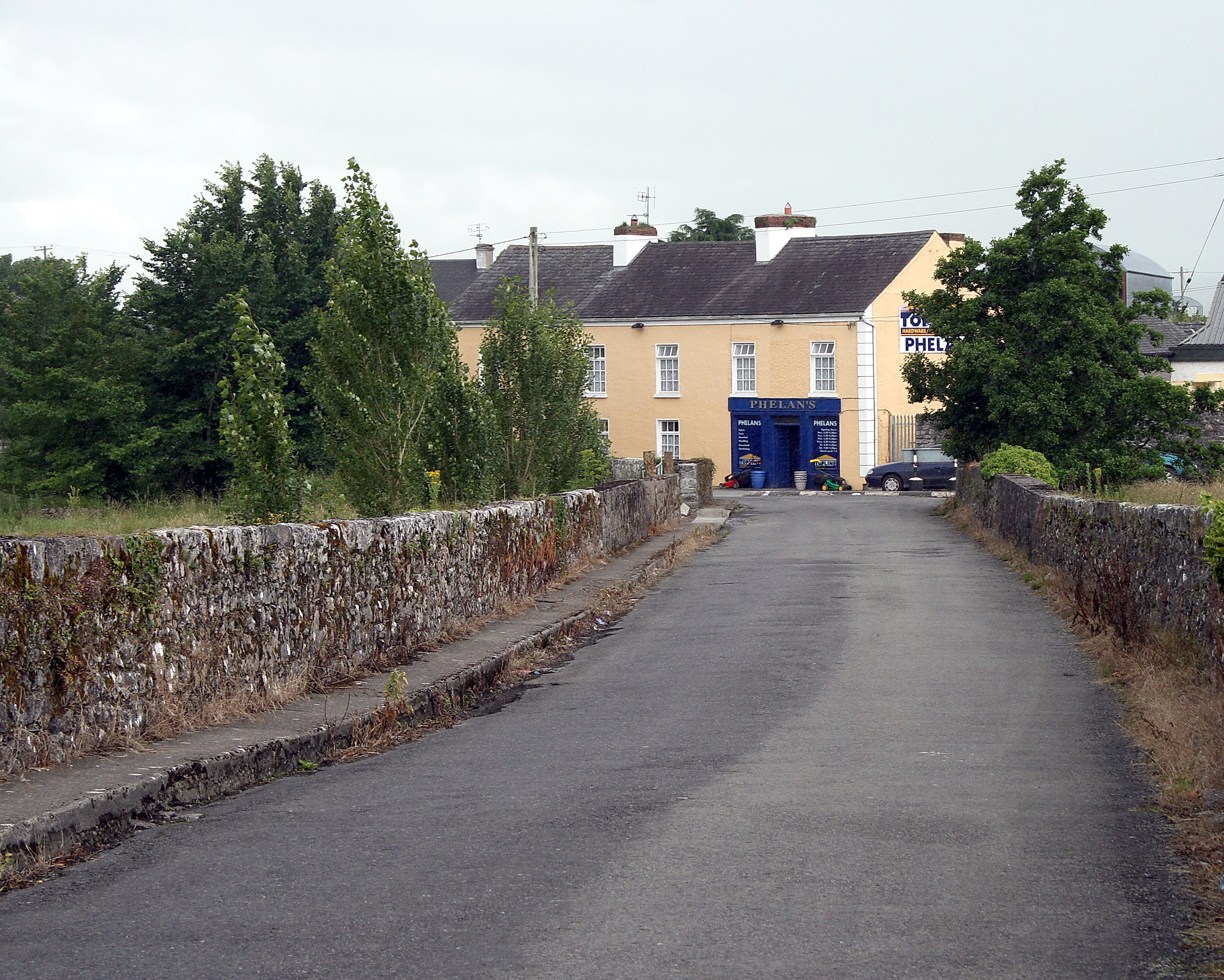
- By-passed section of the R694 - a bridge over the River Nore in Ballyragget, County Kilkenny. The current R694 passes in front of the shop

Route information
- Length: 20 km (12 mi)

Location
- Country: Ireland
- Primary destinations: County Kilkenny; Freshford leave the R693; Ballyragget joins the N77; crosses the River Nore; leaves the N77; (R432); Leaves Ballyragget; Terminates in Castlecomer at junction with the N77 and R426

Highway system
- Roads in Ireland; Motorways; Primary; Secondary; Regional

The R694 road is a regional road in Ireland linking Freshford to Castlecomer, all in County Kilkenny. It passes through the small town of Ballyragget en route. The road is 20 km (12 mi) long.

== See also ==
- Roads in Ireland
- National primary road
- National secondary road
