= Kells (County Kilkenny barony) =

Barony of Kells Ceanannas (Irish)
- Barony
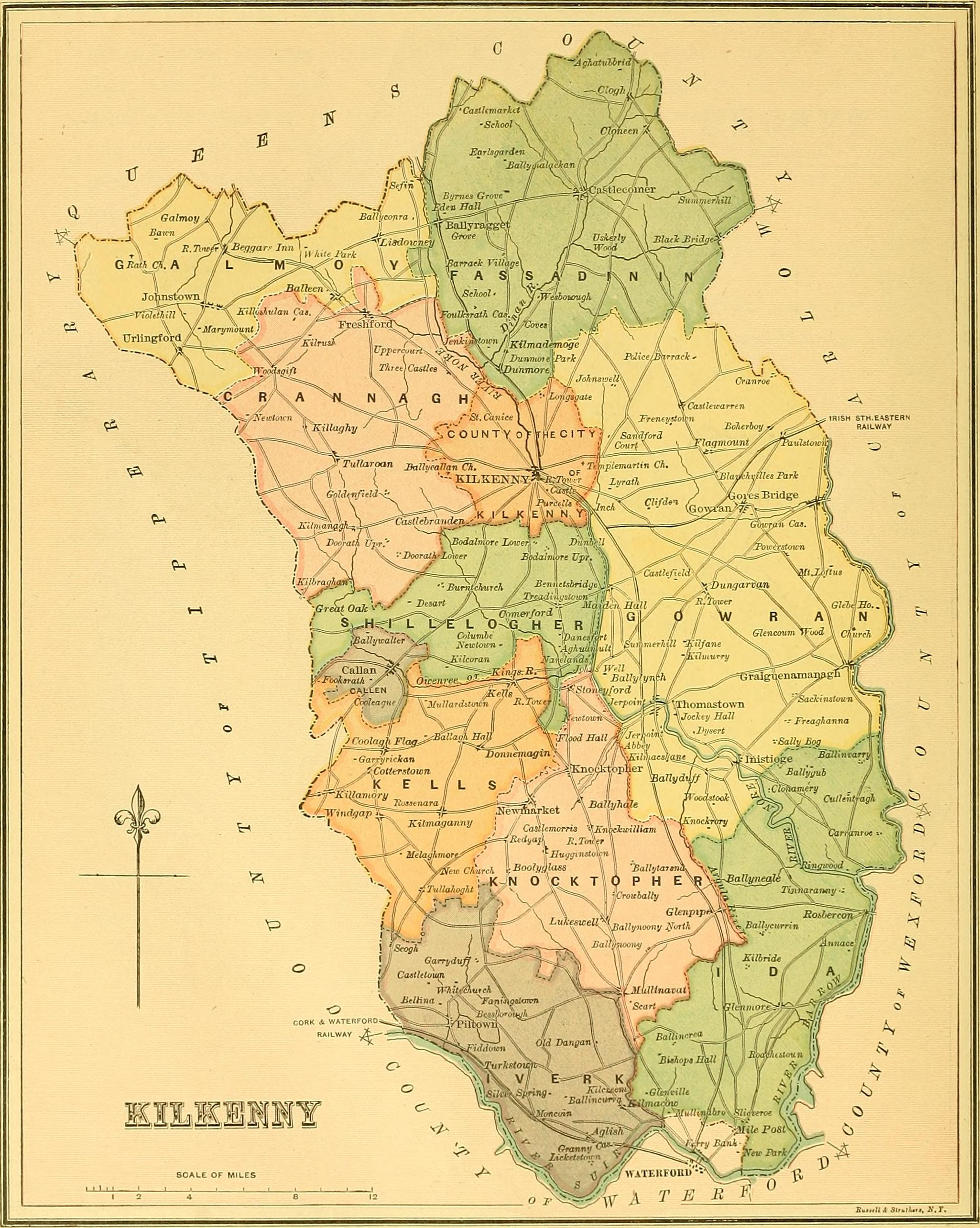
- Etymology: head fort, seat or residence
- Location in Ireland
- Coordinates: 52°27′47″N 7°19′43″W
- Country: Ireland
- Province: Leinster
- County: County Kilkenny
- Civil parishes: List: Ballytobin; Coolaghmore; Dunnamaggin; Kells; Killamery; Kilmaganny; Kilree; Mallardstown; Stonecarthy; Tullahought

Government
  - Type: County Council
  - Body: Kilkenny County Council

Area
  - Total: 155.6 km^{2} (60.1 sq mi)

Kells (Irish: Ceanannas, meaning 'head fort, seat or residence') is a barony in the south-west of County Kilkenny, Ireland. It is one of 12 baronies in County Kilkenny. The size of the barony is 155.6 square kilometres (60.1 sq mi). There are 10 civil parishes in Kells, made up of 167 townlands. The chief town is Kells.

Kells lies to the south-west of the county, with the baronies of Callan and Shillelogher to the north (whose chief towns are Callan and Bennettsbridge), and the baronies of Iverk and Knocktopher to the south (whose chief towns are Piltown and Knocktopher). It has a border with County Tipperary on the west.

The barony was part of the territory of the Ua Glóiairn clan of Callann, and in the historic kingdom of Osraige (Ossory). Kells Priory is located in the barony. Today it is part of the Roman Catholic Church diocese of Ossory and the Church of Ireland diocese of Cashel and Ossory. Kells is currently administered by Kilkenny County Council.

== Etymology ==
The name "Kells" developed from the ancient Irish: Ceanannas (pronounced Kannanas, accent on the first syllable). Still today Ceanannas is used by Irish speakers. After the Norman Invasion "Ceanannas" was corrupted into "Kenelis", and later into "Kells". From the 12th century onward, the settlement was referred to in English and Anglo-Norman as Kenelis, Kenles, Kenlis, Kenlys, Kenllis, Cellys (Deanery), Kyllis, and it has been Kells since the 1655. Carrigan 1905 says that there is no mention of Kells in Ossory in Gaelic records, but agrees with John O'Donovan who suggests the name signifies "the head seat or residence". And that this is of similar origin to Kells in County Meath.

== History ==
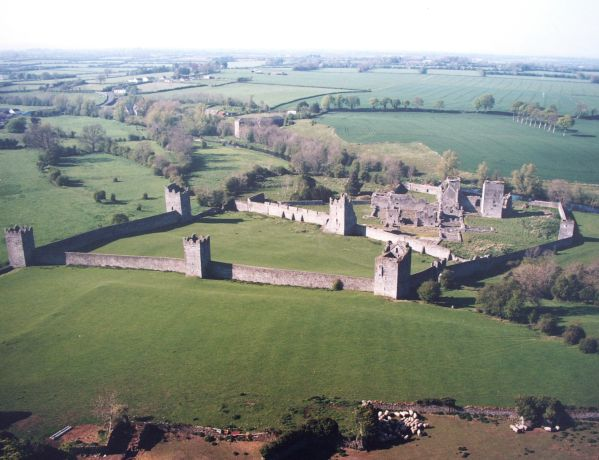
Kells Priory in Kells, County Kilkenny. The 12th Century Priory, now in ruins, with outer walls still intact.

Kells is located in the historic Gaelic kingdom of Ossory (Osraige). According to O'Heerin's Topographical Poem (1420) in the 1170s at the time of the Norman invasion the area was the territory of the clan called the Ua Glóiairn of Callann. The "cantred of O'Glóiairn" was located on both sides of the river Callann, now the King's River and included the present day barony of Callan. The territory of Callan was part of the early "cantred of Kells".

"O'Gloiairn, the fruit branch has got,
A cantred of a sweet country,
A smooth land along the beauteous Callainn,
A land without a particle of blemish."

— O'Heerin Topographical Poem (1420)

In 1358 the "Barony of Kenlys" was very small and located in the eastern portion of the present barony. In the western part of the modern barony was the "cantred of Erley". The barony of Erley and the barony of Kells have been merged for many centuries. The barony of Erley must also have included the parish of Earlstown or Erley that is now in the barony of Shillelogher, and the townland of Frankford also belonged to Erley.

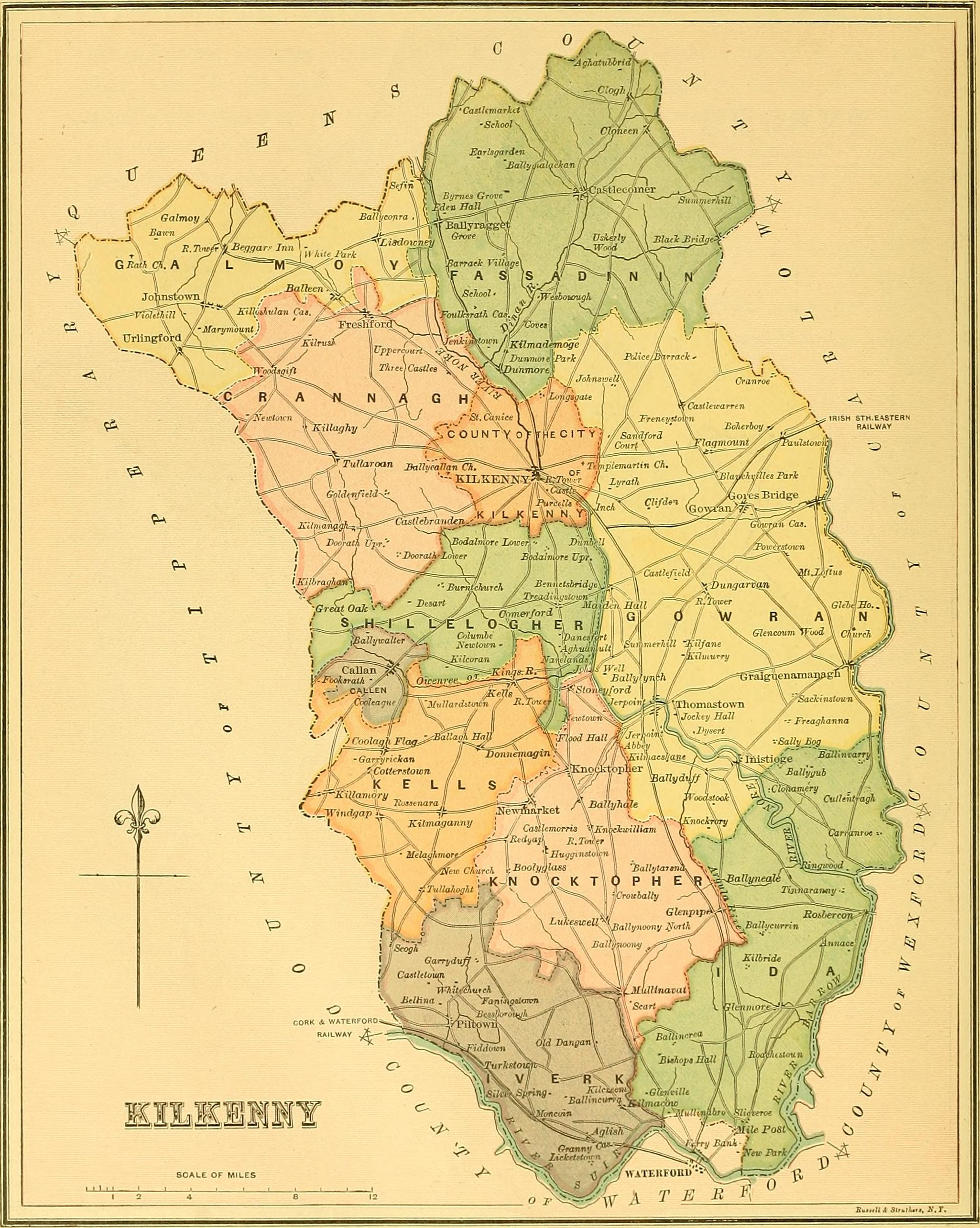
Barony map of County Kilkenny.

On 14 January 1387 William, son of Richard Tobin ("de Sancto Albino") granted to James Butler, 2nd Earl of Ormond, one messuage, with two carucates, and 20 acres of arable land in Moyclere in the Barony of Erley.

Baron of Kells, Geoffrey FitzRobert de Monte Marisco, who was Richard de Clare's Constable of Leinster, built a castle by the banks of the Kings River and founded a town (the village of Kells) in c.1192. He married the illegitimate half-sister of Isabel de Clare, Basile de Clare, who was the widow of Raymond FitzGerald and grand-daughter to Gilbert de Clare. In the late 12th century, Huolyn (Howlin) served as Lords of Kilree.

By the end of the 14th century the Sweetmans had succeeded the D'Erleys in their property of Earlstown and title Baron of Erley, they were based at Castleeve Castle. Kells was recorded in the Down Survey (1656), the 1840 Ordnance Survey map, and on Griffith's Valuation (1864).

== Geography ==
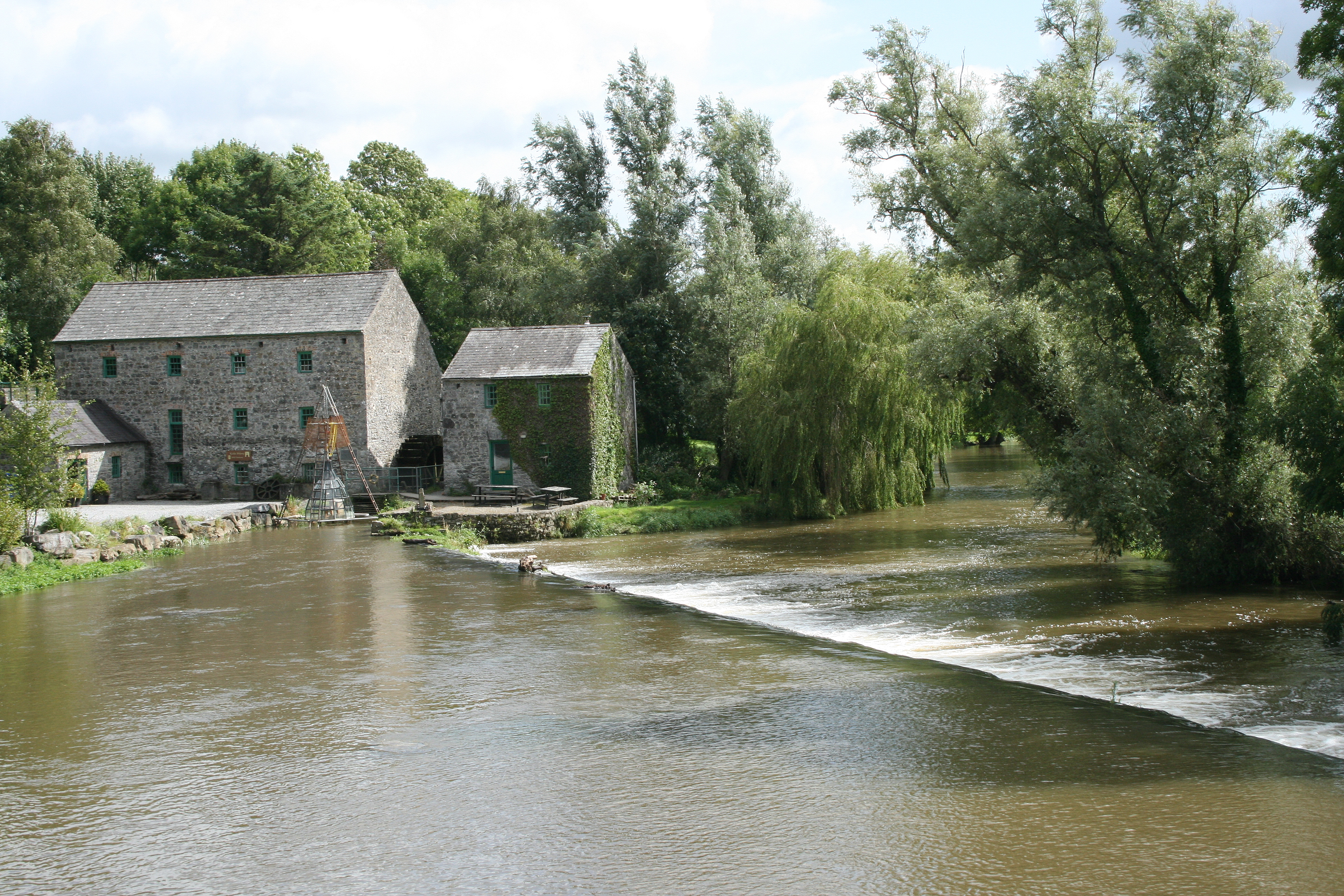
Kings River in Kells in County Kilkenny

Contains the King's River or River Glory, which had a ford at Aughatarry and a bridge called Kyleadohir Bridge. The King’s River originates in the Slieveardagh Hills, it flows 25 kilometres northwest to Kells village and it then flows 6 kilometres east where it feeds into the River Nore. The surrounding landscape is undulating, with a mix of tillage and grazing lands. The Walsh Mountains are in the barony and they stretch into the barony of barony of Knocktopher.

Kells barony contains the towns of Kells and Kilmaganny, and the settlements of Baurscoob, Windgap, Dunnamaggan. The village of Kells is situated on the south side of the King’s River on its floodplain.

Kells contains the civil parishes of Ballytobin, Coolaghmore, Dunnamaggan, Kells, Dunnamaggan, Kilmaganny, Kilree, Mallardstown, Stonecarthy, and Tullahought.

Kells contains parts of the Roman Catholic parishes of Callan, Dunnamaggan, and Windgap. Parts of the barony were in the Poor law unions of Callan, Carrick on Suir, and Thomastown.

== See also ==
- Barony (county division)
- Barony (Ireland)
- List of baronies of Ireland
- List of townlands of County Kilkenny
- List of Irish Local Government Areas 1900 - 1921
