= Danesfort =

Townland in County Kilkenny, Ireland

Danesfort Dún Feart
- Civil parish
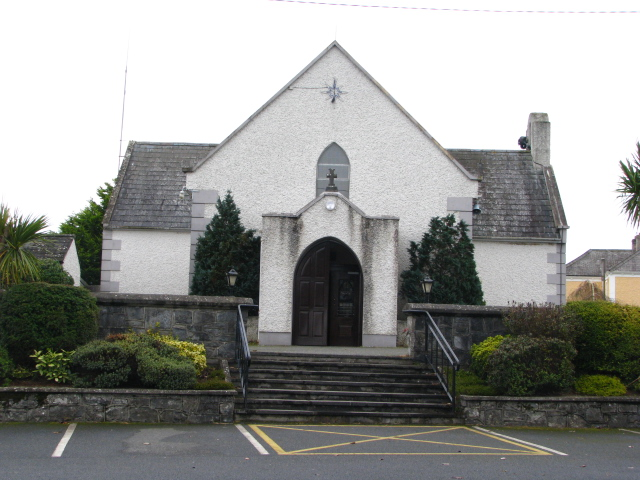
- Saint Michael's Catholic church in Danesfort

- Location in Ireland
- Coordinates: 52°33′N 7°15′W
- Country: Ireland
- Province: Leinster
- County: County Kilkenny

Population (2011)
  - Total: 99
- (Danesfort townland)
- Time zone: UTC+0 (WET)
  - Summer (DST): UTC+1 (IST (WEST))

Danesfort (Irish: Dún Feart, meaning 'fort of the grave mound') is a civil parish, electoral division and rural townland in County Kilkenny, Ireland. Located approximately 6 km from Kilkenny City on the N10 (Waterford to Kilkenny road), the M9 motorway also passes through Danesfort townland.

The area has a primary school, Roman Catholic church (including graveyard), creche, community centre and a care home for the elderly. The local Gaelic Athletic Association (GAA) club is Danesfort GAA. A holy well, known as Lady's Well, is in Ballyda townland in Danesfort parish.

== Location ==
Danesfort townland is in a civil parish and electoral division of the same name, in the historical barony of Shillelogher. For census purposes, parts of the electoral division of Danesfort were included within the census area of Bennettsbridge, a nearby town, in the 2006 census.

Danesfort is included within Kilkenny City for the purposes of Gaelic Athletic Association (GAA) structures, and the local credit union is the St. Canice's Kilkenny City Credit Union.

The local Catholic church, St Michael's Church in Danesfort, is within the Roman Catholic Diocese of Ossory.

== See also ==
- List of townlands in County Kilkenny
