= Burnchurch =

Civil parish in County Kilkenny, Ireland

Burnchurch Irish: An Teampall Loiscthe
- Civil parish
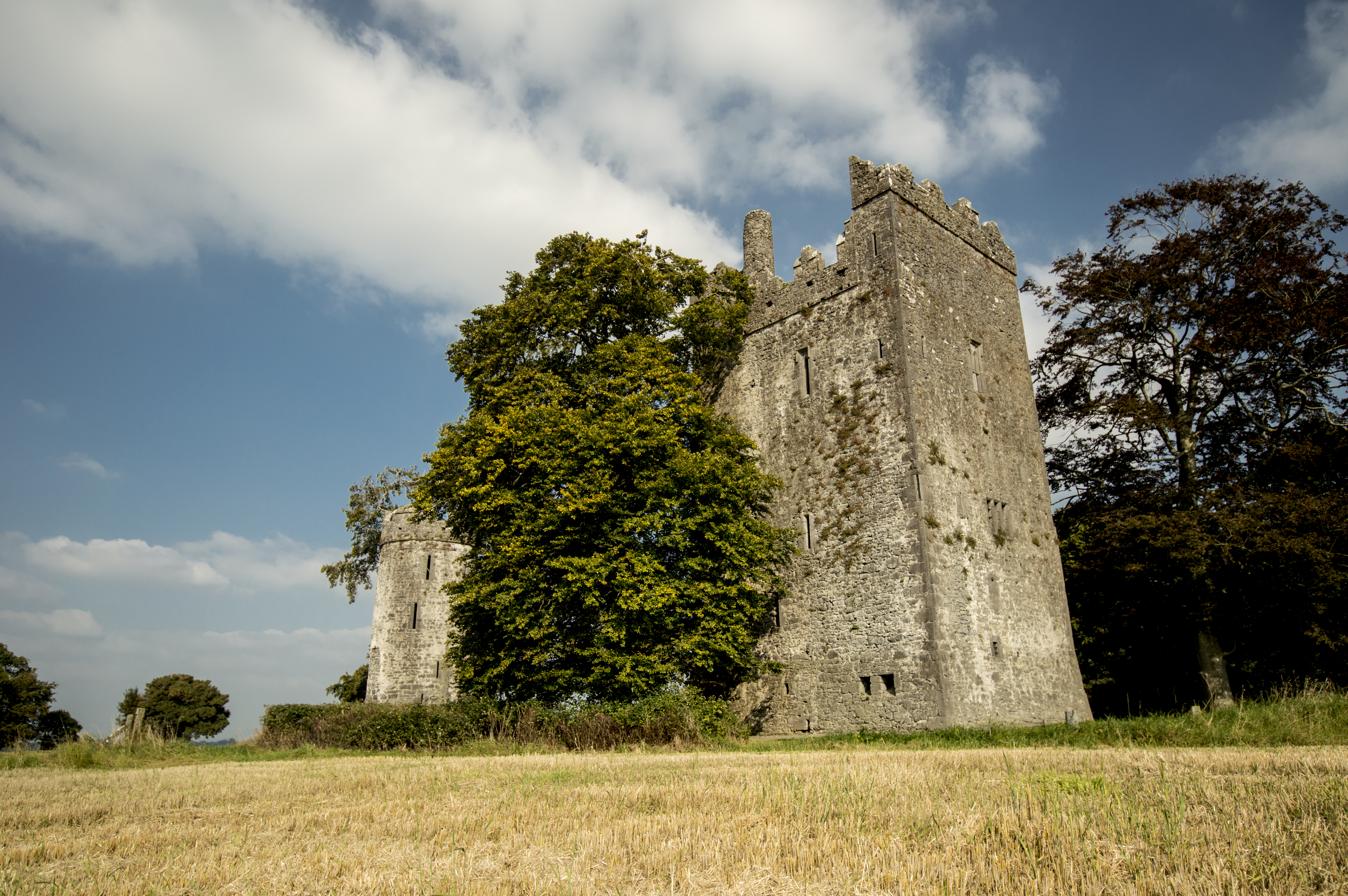
- Burnchurch Castle, dating to the 15th or 16th century, is protected as a national monument

- Location within Ireland
- Coordinates: 52.578°N 7.302°W
- Country: Ireland
- County: Kilkenny
- Barony: Shillelogher

Area
  - Total: 13.7 km^{2} (5.3 sq mi)
- Irish grid reference: S476474

Burnchurch (Irish: An Teampall Loiscthe) is a civil parish in Shillelogher, County Kilkenny, Ireland. It has an area of approximately 13.7 square kilometres (3,400 acres). Burnchurch parish contains 15 townlands, including a townland also known as Burnchurch. As of the 2011 census, Burnchurch townland had a population of 111 people. The local national (primary) school, Burnchurch National School, had an enrollment of 61 pupils as of early 2024.

== History and etymology ==
The name of the parish derives from the townland of Burnchurch situated within the parish. The townland itself was originally named after the early Irish church founded there in the 6th century by Saint Dallán Forgaill. The original name of the church was Cill Dalláin, meaning the 'church of Dallán'. The Irish name was later corrupted into different spellings such as Kiltranyn, Kiltranen, Kyltranyn, Kiltranye and Kiltranyheyn. Kiltrani seemes to be the earliest surviving mention in 1225.

After the Norman invasion of Ireland, the parish was granted to the Fitzmaurice family. St Dallán's feast day is held on 29 January and the feast was certainly kept there in medieval times, as a document (No. 81) in the Calendar of Ormond Deeds dated 1429 states:

"Richard Horihan quit-claims to John, son of Richard Tobyn of Barlesky, all claim in all his messuages, lands and tenements in Kylamery to him and his heirs for ever. Given on the feast of St. Dallan in the 7th year of Henry VI. January 29, 1429. Seal"

Barlesky and Kylamery are corruptions of the modern townlands of Caherlesk and Killamery in the adjoining parishes of Ballytobin and Killamery. There is a holy well in the middle of Burnchurch townland named 'Tobar San Dallán' (St. Dallan's Well) in honour of the saint. The Roman Catholic Bishop of Ossory Diocese, James Phelan (1669–1695), wrote a list of patrons of the different parishes in the diocese and stated that a pattern was held at Dallán's well annually for the week commencing 31 July (probably because the weather was warmer then rather than holding it on the feast day of the saint).

According to Fr. Stephen Barron in his article Distinguished Waterford Families, published in "The Journal of the Waterford Archaeological Society" (Vol. XVII, 1914, page 54), Robert the Bruce burned Kiltranyn in 1316 and after that it was henceforth known as Burnchurch (in Irish Teampall Loiscthe or the incinerated church). In Latin it was named Ecclesia Cremata and Ecclesia Combusta. There is, however, a lack of documentary evidence for this burning and the earliest mention of the name "Burnchurch" dates from the beginning of the 15th century.

Burnchurch Castle, between Farmley and Burnchurch townlands, is a 15th or 16th-century tower house that is historically associated with the FitzGerald dynasty. It is protected as a state-owned national monument.

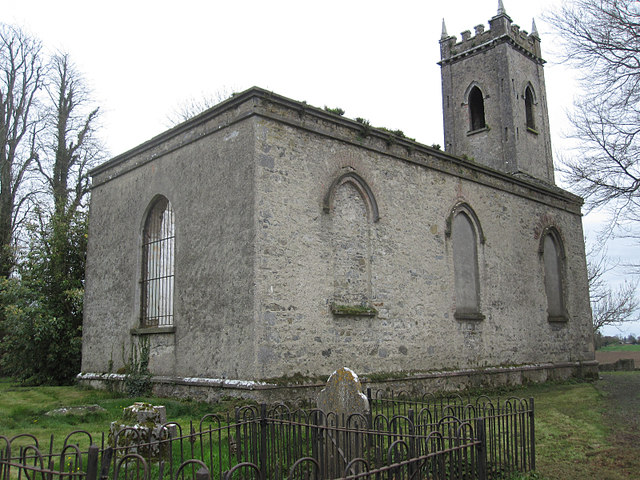
The Church of Ireland church in Burnchurch, now disused, was built c. 1810

The nearby Church of Ireland (Anglican) church was built c. 1810. It has been disused since its closure in the mid-20th century. The adjoining cemetery contains grave markers dating from the early 18th to the mid-20th century.

== Townlands ==
The townlands of Burnchurch civil parish include: Ballymack (Desart); Ballymack (Flood); Ballyroberts; Booly; Burnchurch; Burnchurch Viper; Coalsfarm; Farmley; Graigue Lower; Graigue Upper; Newlands; Oldtown; Paddock; Sunhill and Washers Bog.
