= Ballyda =

Townland in County Kilkenny, Ireland

Ballyda Baile Dháith
- Townland
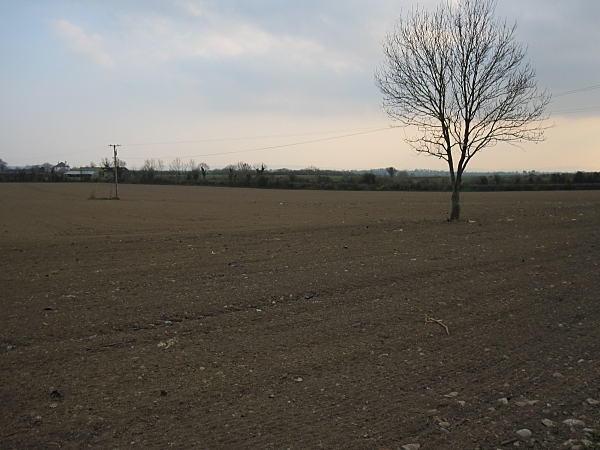
- Tilled field in Ballyda townland

- Location in Ireland
- Coordinates: 52°34′40″N 7°15′34″W
- Country: Ireland
- Province: Leinster
- County: County Kilkenny
- Time zone: UTC+0 (WET)
  - Summer (DST): UTC-1 (IST (WEST))

Ballyda (Irish: Baile Dháith) is a small townland in the civil parish of Danesfort in County Kilkenny, Ireland. The townland has an area of approximately 1.4 square kilometres (0.5 sq mi), and is 9 kilometres (6 mi) south of Kilkenny city centre. It had a population of 70 people as of the 2011 census.

== Built heritage ==
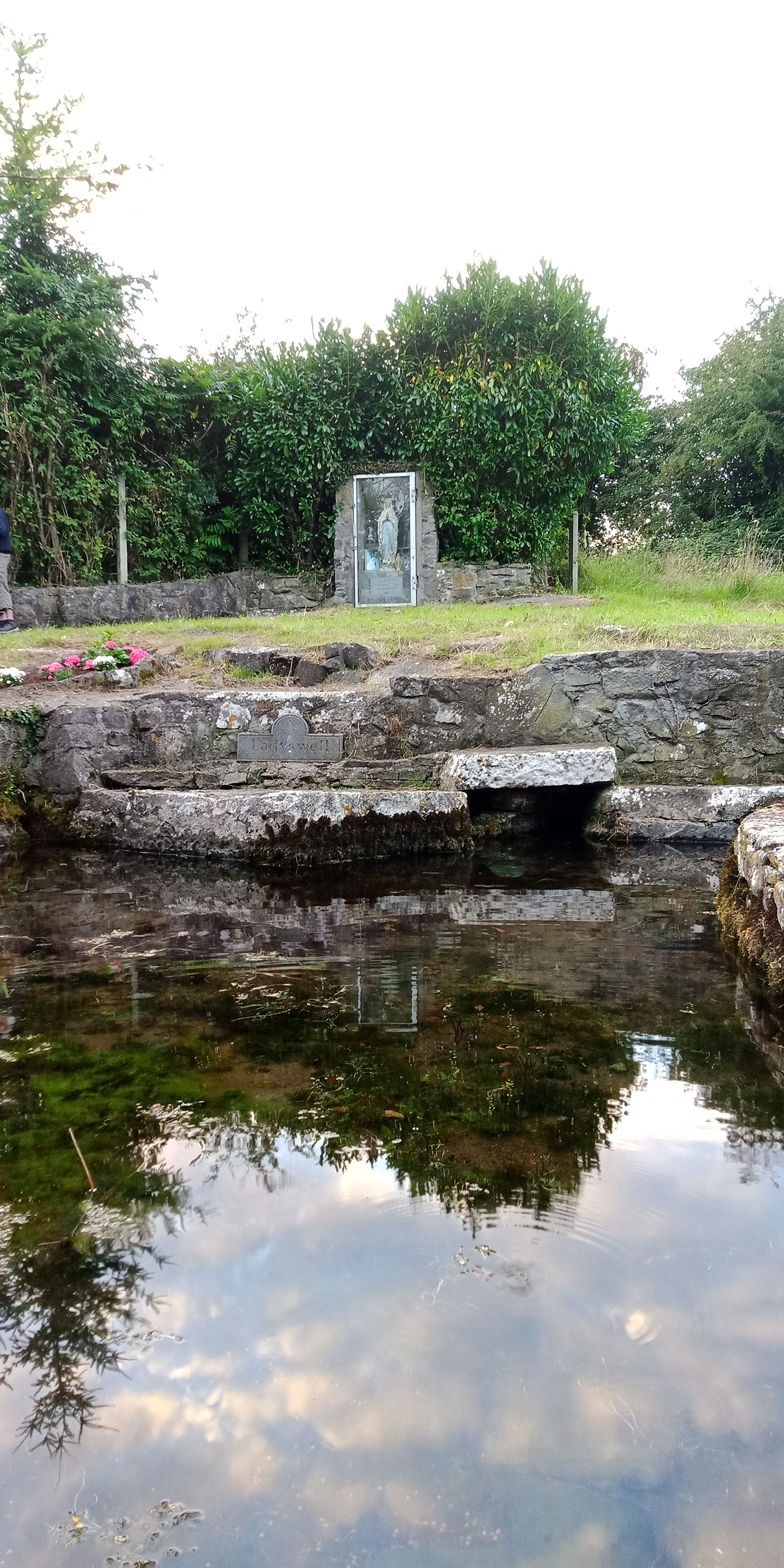
Well and shrine at Lady's Well in Ballyda

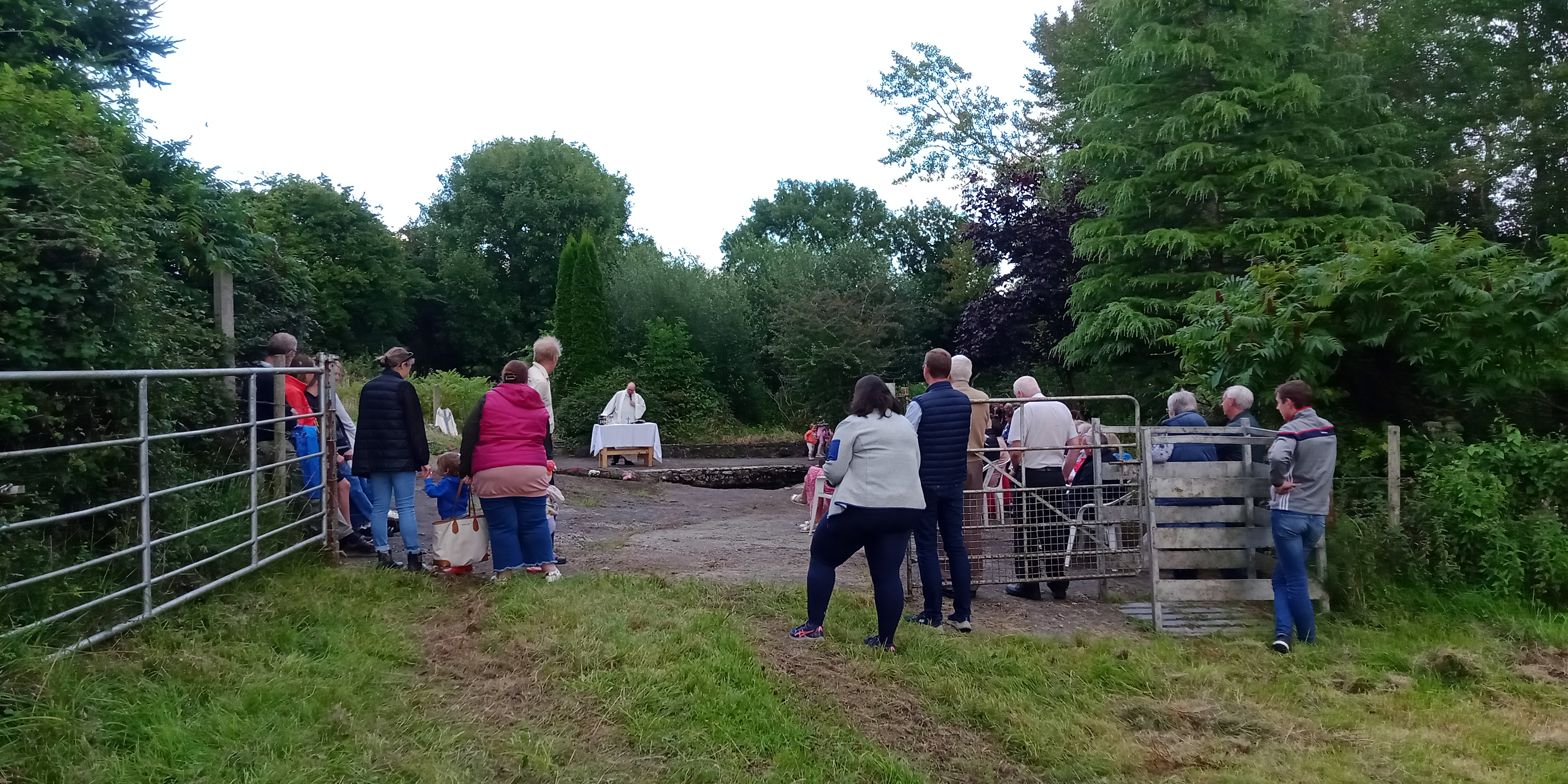
Pattern day at Lady's Well in 2023

Evidence of ancient settlement within Ballyda townland includes a number of ring ditch and enclosure sites.

There is also a holy well site in the townland. This well, known as Lady's Well (Irish: Tobar Mhuire), is included in the Record of Monuments and Places as record number "KK023-075----". As of the late 20th century, a pattern was still celebrated at this well on 15 August each year, to mark the Feast of the Assumption of Mary. Several folkloric tales about Lady's Well are recorded in the Dúchas.ie "Schools' Collection". These include a number of stories which refer to apparitions of the Virgin Mary at the well. Several stories reflect common themes in the folklore of holy wells generally, such as that water collected from the well will not boil or that stones in the well are spotted with blood. The origin of the blood at Lady's Well is given as coming from a priest who was killed there by soldiers while saying mass. One folktale tells of a woman whose eyes were cured after bathing her eyes in the well's water.

== See also ==
- List of townlands in County Kilkenny
