= Knocknamuck =

Mountain in County Tipperary, Ireland

- Cnoc na Muc
- Location within Ireland

Highest point
- Elevation: 340 m (1,120 ft)
- Prominence: 268 m (879 ft)
- Listing: Marilyn
- Coordinates: 52°38′43.79″N 7°31′43.79″W

Naming
- English translation: Hill of the Pig.
- Language of name: Irish

Geography
- Location: County Tipperary, Ireland
- Parent range: Slieveardagh Hills
- OSI/OSNI grid: M036599
- Topo map: OSi Discovery 67

Knocknamuck (Irish: Cnoc na Muc) is a mountain in County Tipperary, Ireland.

== Etymology ==
Its name means "Hill of the Pigs".

== Geography ==
At 340 metres (1,115 ft) Knocknamuck is highest summit in the Slieveardagh Hills and the 916th highest summit in Ireland.

== See also ==
- List of mountains in Ireland
