= Spahill and Clomantagh Hill =

Protected area in County Kilkenny, Ireland

Clomantagh Hill
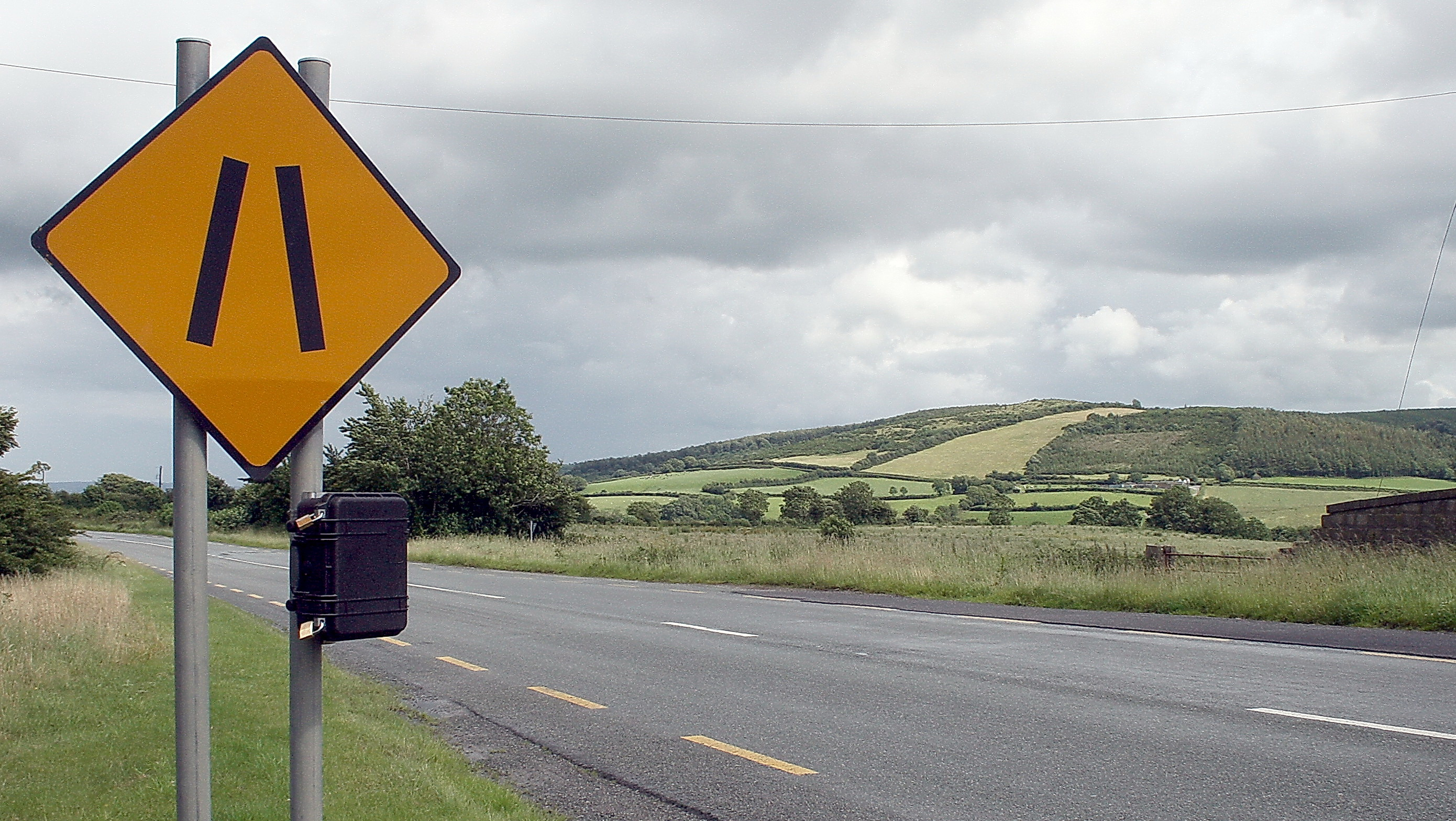

Highest point
- Elevation: 349 m (1,145 ft)
- Prominence: 217 m (712 ft)
- Listing: Marilyn
- Coordinates: 52°44′23.61″N 7°30′29.51″W

Naming
- Native name: Cnoc na Cloiche Mantaí

Geography
- Location within island of Ireland
- Location: County Kilkenny, Ireland
- Parent range: Slieveardagh Hills
- Topo map: OSi Discovery 67

Geology
- Mountain type: calcarenitic limestone

Spahill and Clomantagh Hill is a Special Area of Conservation (SAC) in County Kilkenny, Ireland. The SAC is in the parish of Balleen and includes the townlands of Clomantagh (Mt Garrett) and Spahill, in Irish Spahill is Cnoc na Spá and Clomantagh Hill is An Chloch Mhantach.

== Description ==
Spahill is the eastern part of the SAC and forms part of an escarpment which connects the Slieveardagh Hills with the Castlecomer Plateau. Spahill is mostly limestone which is exposed in ledges and flat sheets and Clomantagh Hill has a geology which is quite similar to that of Spahill but the summit has an exposure of the overlying sandstone, this looks different from the limestone as it appears as low rocks. The different exposures of rocks over the sites gives rise to differences in the flora which is important because this variety of natural grassland communities has become rare in Ireland as a result of agricultural intensification.

== Flora ==
The grasslands of the SAC contain a scattering of the green-winged orchid and two other orchids frog orchid and Common Spotted-orchid have been recorded from the site. These are mainly in the base-rich areas overlying the limestone. Over the sandstone at the summit of Clomantagh Hill there is a markedly different flora which includes more ling and other plants more typical of heaths. The SAC contains some woodland to its north west, mainly of downy birch and hazel which has a rich ground flora. The priority species that the SAC conserves is the green-winged orchid, a species listed in the Irish red data Book.

== Clomantagh Hill ==
Clomantagh Hill, also known as Killoshulan rises to a height of 349 metres (1,145 ft), is the highest point in the northern Slieve Ardagh Hills, the 3rd highest point in County Kilkenny. and the 972nd highest summit in Ireland. It is classified as a Marilyn. The name of the mountain means Hill of the gapped stone.

== See also ==
- Clomantagh Castle
- List of mountains in Ireland
