= Shillelogher =

Barony in County Kilkenny, Ireland

Shillelogher Irish: Síol Fhaolchair
- Barony
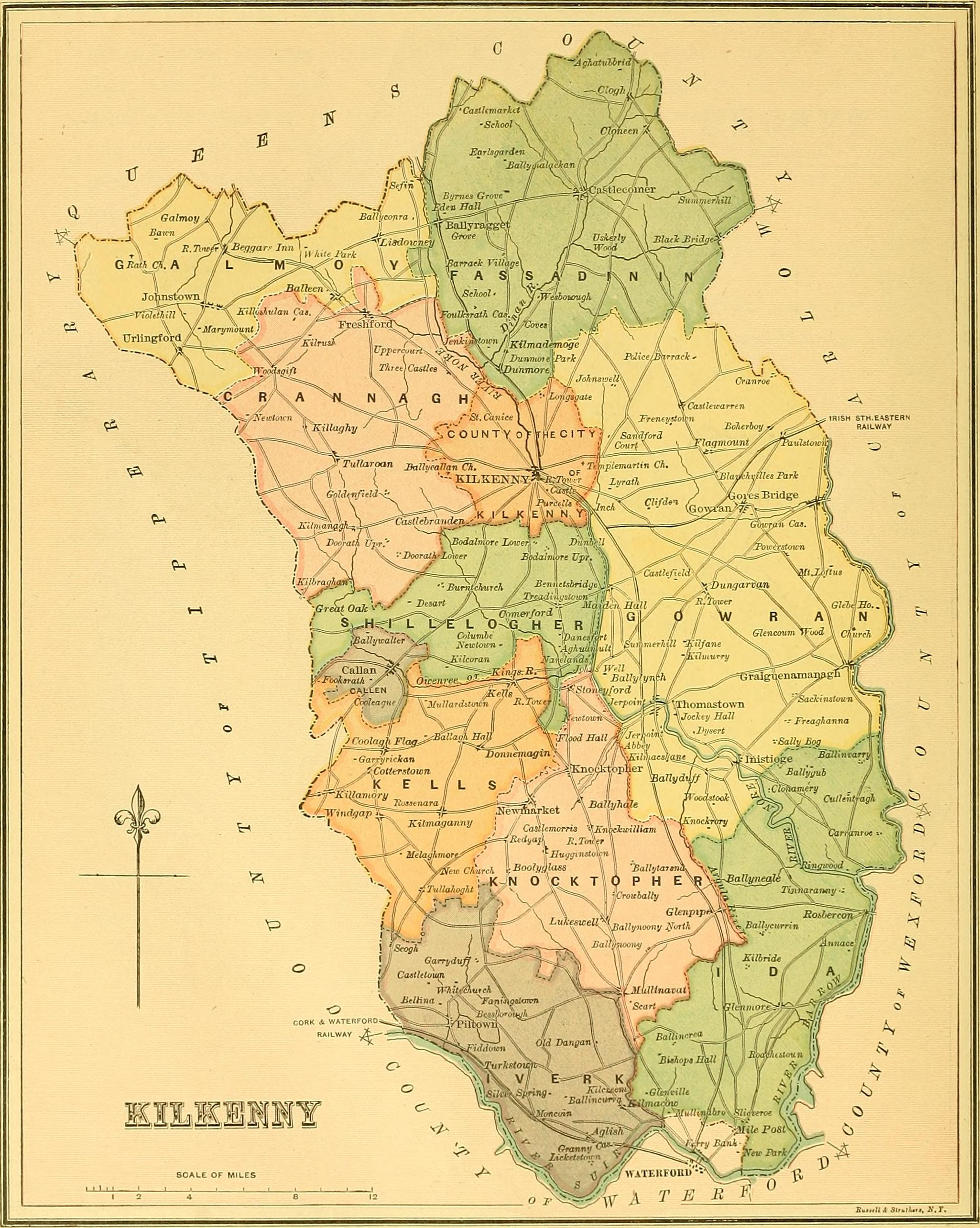
- Etymology: territory of the Descendants of Fáelchar
- Location in Ireland
- Coordinates: 52.5719025°N 7.3351341°W
- Country: Ireland
- Province: Leinster
- County: County Kilkenny
- Barony of Shillelogher: By 1672
- Civil parishes: List: Ballybur; Burnchurch; Castleinch or Inchyolaghan; Danesfort; Earlstown; Ennisnag; Grange; Grangekilree; Kells; Kilferagh; Killaloe; Outrath; St. Canice; St. John's; St. Patrick's; Stonecarthy; Treadingstown; Tullaghanbrogue; Tullamaine

Government
  - Type: County Council
  - Body: Kilkenny County Council

Area
  - Total: 14,845 ha (36,684 acres)

The barony of Shillelogher (Irish: Síol Fhaolchair, meaning 'territory of the Descendants of Fáelchar') is a barony in the west of County Kilkenny, Ireland. The barony is 36,684 acres (148.45 km^{2}) in size. It is one of 12 baronies in County Kilkenny. There are 19 civil parishes in Shillelogher, made up of 109 townlands. The chief town is Bennettsbridge. Shillelogher lies at the centre of the county, with the baronies of Crannagh and Kilkenny to the north (whose chief towns are Freshford and Kilkenny, and the barony of Gowran to the east (whose chief towns is Gowran). It is borders County Tipperary to the west. The N76 road bisects the barony. The river Nore flows through the barony. Danesfort Church is located in Shillelogher.

Shillelogher was an early medieval cantred within the shire of Kilkenny, and part of the historic kingdom of Osraige (Ossory). Today it is part of the Roman Catholic Church diocese of Ossory and the Church of Ireland diocese of Cashel and Ossory. Shillelogher is currently administered by Kilkenny County Council.

== Etymology ==
There have been many variations of the name, but all are anglicized variations form the old Irish name, 'Síol Fhaolchair', which means – territory of the Descendants of Fáelchar. The 'f' would be silent and 'l' easily commuted with 'r'. So the name appears under many forms in ancient records, such as 'Stilyker' (1333), 'Sillr', Silelogher, Shillekyr, Shyllekyr, Sylerekyll (1450), Sylerker (1480), in the Red Book of Ossory, Sillelogher (1303), 'Sileyrthir', 'shillegher' or 'shilleligher' in 1587, 'Shillekyr' and 'Shillecher' in 1608; 'Shelogher' in 1657; and 'Sleewloger', 'Shellelogher' and 'Shilliliger'.

== History ==
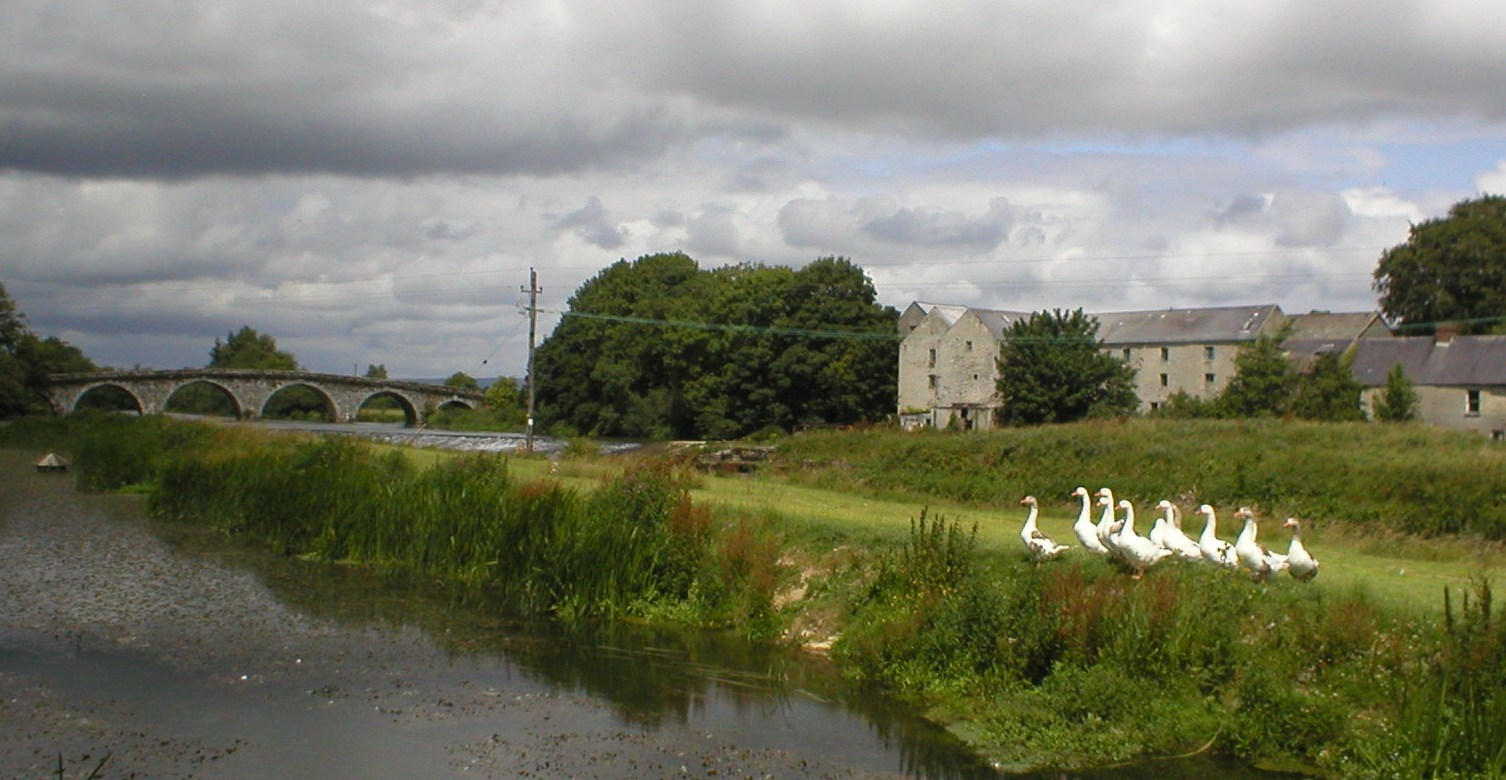
Bennettsbridge—view from the pottery weir.

Named as, Descendants of Fáelchar territory. Fáelchar ua Máele Ódrain was a king of Osraige, descended from Óengus Osrithe. The Norman family of Wall was based there.

In 1358 it appears as the 'cantred of Silyrthir' and perhaps included the barony of Crannagh as well as the barony of Shillelogher. Shillelogher was recorded in the Down Survey (1656), the 1842 Ordnance Survey map, and on Griffith's Valuation (1864).

It was established by 1672 and depicted in Hiberniae Delineatio, "Perry's Atlas", engraved in 1671-2 by William Petty from the data of the Down Survey.

== Geography ==
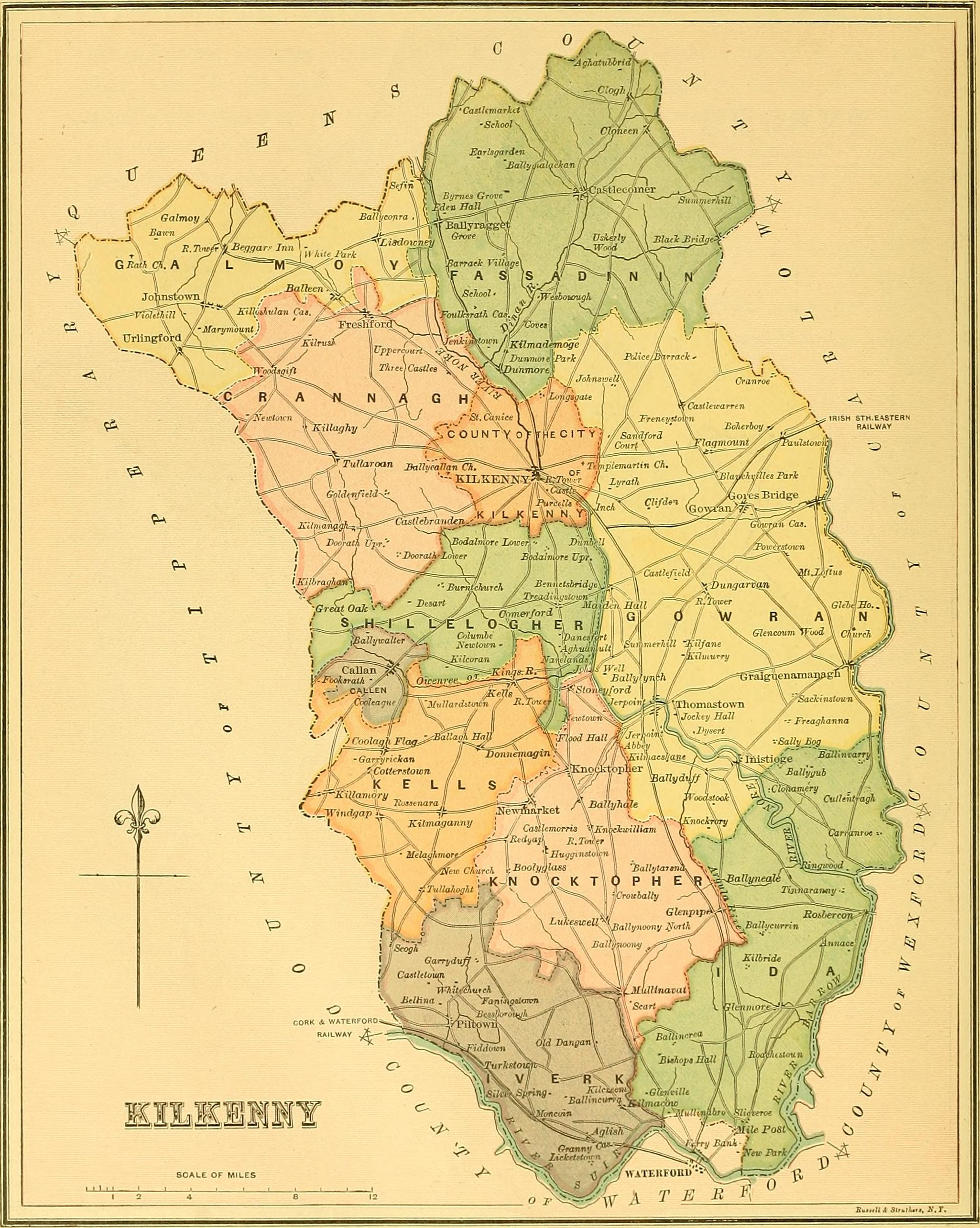
Barony map of County Kilkenny.

The river Nore flows through the barony. Shillelogher contains the towns of Bennettsbridge and the settlements of Stonyford, Danesfort, and Grange. Danesfort Church is in Shillelogher.

There are 19 civil parishes in Shillelogher. These include; Ballybur, Burnchurch, Castleinch, Danesfort, Earlstown, Ennisnag, Grange, Grangekilree, Kells, Kilferagh, Killaloe, Outrath, St. Canice, St. John's, St. Patrick's, Stonecarthy, Treadingstown, Tullaghanbrogue, and Tullamaine. Parts of the barony were in the Poor law unions of Callan, Kilkenny, and Thomastown.

== See also ==
- List of baronies of Ireland
- List of townlands of County Kilkenny
