= Galmoy, County Kilkenny =

Village in County Kilkenny, Ireland

Galmoy Gabhalmhaigh
- Village
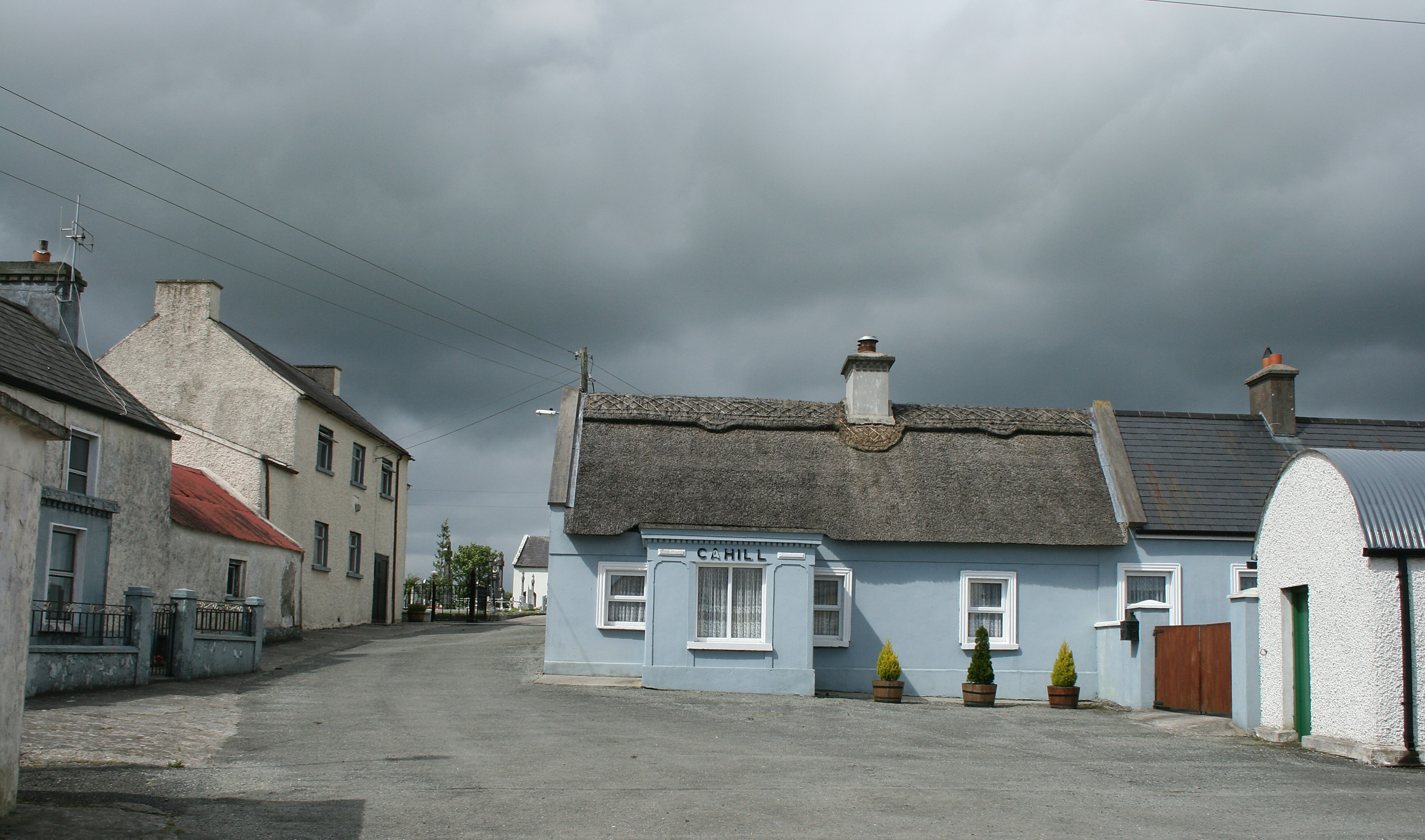

- Location in Ireland
- Coordinates: 52°47′N 7°35′W
- Country: Ireland
- Province: Leinster
- County: County Kilkenny
- Time zone: UTC+0 (WET)
  - Summer (DST): UTC-1 (IST (WEST))
- Website: www.kilkennycoco.ie/eng/

Galmoy (Irish: Gabhalmhaigh) is a village in the barony of Galmoy, County Kilkenny in the southeastern part of the midlands of Ireland.

It is located on the Kilkenny–Laois border, between the villages of Cullohill and Johnstown. It is 9 km from both Urlingford and Rathdowney, 28 km from Thurles, 30 km from Kilkenny and 40 km from Portlaoise.

The town lends its name to Galmoy Mine, a zinc and lead mine.

In 2002, the village had 283 residents.

== Buildings ==
Eirke Church was built in 1823. It also has a house and an acre of land.

Grangefertagh Round Tower is located on the Johnstown-Galmoy border.

== Rivers ==
A minor tributary of the River Nore, the River Goul flows through the parish of Galmoy in multiple places. The river flows through Urlingford, Johnstown, Galmoy and Cullohill before joining the River Erkina near Durrow. The River Goul flows through the three counties of Tipperary, Kilkenny and Laois.

== Sport ==
Galmoy GAA Club was founded in December 1929 and serves the parish of Galmoy. Galmoy GAA mainly focuses on hurling, however they also compete in the Kilkenny Junior Football League and Championships, reaching the League final in 2022. They have won 3 Kilkenny Junior Hurling Championship Titles, the most recent being in 2004, as well as 13 divisional titles. Galmoy's underage teams amalgamate with Windgap. Galmoy Handball Club is also very successful, winning many County, Leinster and All Ireland titles.

== See also ==
- List of towns and villages in Ireland
