= Slieveardagh Hills =

Hills in counties Kilkenny/Tipperary, Ireland

- Location within island of Ireland

Highest point
- Peak: Clomantagh Hill
- Elevation: 349 m (1,145 ft)
- Coordinates: 52°43′26″N 7°28′2″W

Geography
- Country: Ireland
- Province: Leinster
- Counties: Kilkenny and Tipperary
- Barony: Slievardagh

The Slieveardagh Hills are a low range of hills on the County Tipperary - Kilkenny border, mainly in the Tipperary barony of Slievardagh. The highest point is Clomantagh Hill at 349 m and the highest point by relative height in the hills is Knocknamuck at 340m with prominence of 268m. The hills contain the source of the River Goul, which flows north and the Kings River which flows southwards from the hills.

The Slieveardagh Hills extend eastward into County Kilkenny.

== See also ==
- Brandon Hill
- List of mountains in Ireland
