= Kilkenny Junior A Hurling Championship =

Annual hurling competition for junior hurling clubs in Kilkenny

- Irish: Craobh Iomána Shóisear A Chill Chainnigh
- Code: Hurling
- Region: Kilkenny (GAA)
- No. of teams: 10
- Title holders: Glenmore (1st title)
- Sponsors: JJ Kavanagh & Sons
- Official website: Official website

The Kilkenny Junior A Hurling Championship (known for sponsorship reasons as the JJ Kavanagh & Sons Junior A Hurling Championship and abbreviated to the Kilkenny JAHC) is an annual hurling competition organised by the Kilkenny County Board of the Gaelic Athletic Association and contested by junior-ranked clubs in the county of Kilkenny in Ireland. It is the fourth tier overall in the entire Kilkenny hurling championship system.

In its current format, the Kilkenny Junior Championship is played across the summer months. The 10 participating teams engage in a double elimination tournament that culminates with the final and the awarding of the Bob Aylward Cup.

Glenmore are the current champions, after beating Ballyhale Shamrocks in the 2026 final.

== Format ==
=== Overview ===
Round 1: The 10 participating teams are drawn against each other in random pairings. Five matches are played with the five winning teams advancing to the quarter-finals. Four of the losing teams progress to round 2. One of the losing teams receives a bye to the quarter-finals.

Round 2: The four losing teams are drawn against each other in random pairings. Two matches are played with the two winning teams advancing to the quarter-finals.

Quarter-finals: The 8 participating teams are drawn against each other with the five first-round winners playing the two second-round winners and the losing team that received a bye. Four matches are played with the four winning teams advancing to the semi-finals.

Semi-finals: Two matches are played with the two winning teams advancing to the final.

Final: The two semi-final winners contest the final. The winning team are declared champions.

=== Promotion and relegation ===
At the end of the championship, the winning team is automatically promoted to the Kilkenny Premier Junior Hurling Championship for the following season. The two round 2 losing teams take part in a playoff, with the losing team being relegated to the Kilkenny Junior B Hurling Championship.

== Sponsorship ==
JJ Kavanagh & Sons have been the long-time sponsors of the Kilkenny Junior A Hurling Championship.

== List of finals ==
Year	Winners		Runners-up		#
Year	Club	Score	Club	Score	#
2026	Glenmore	2-17	Ballyhale Shamrocks	0-14	
2025	Tullaroan	0-23	Threecastles	2-10	
2024	Young Irelands	2-15	Dunnamaggin	0-18	
2023	Dicksboro	1-18	O'Loughlin Gaels	0-19	
2022	Thomastown	w/o	Carrickshock	scr.	
2021	Mooncoin	0-21	Dunnamaggin	1-16	
