= River Goul =

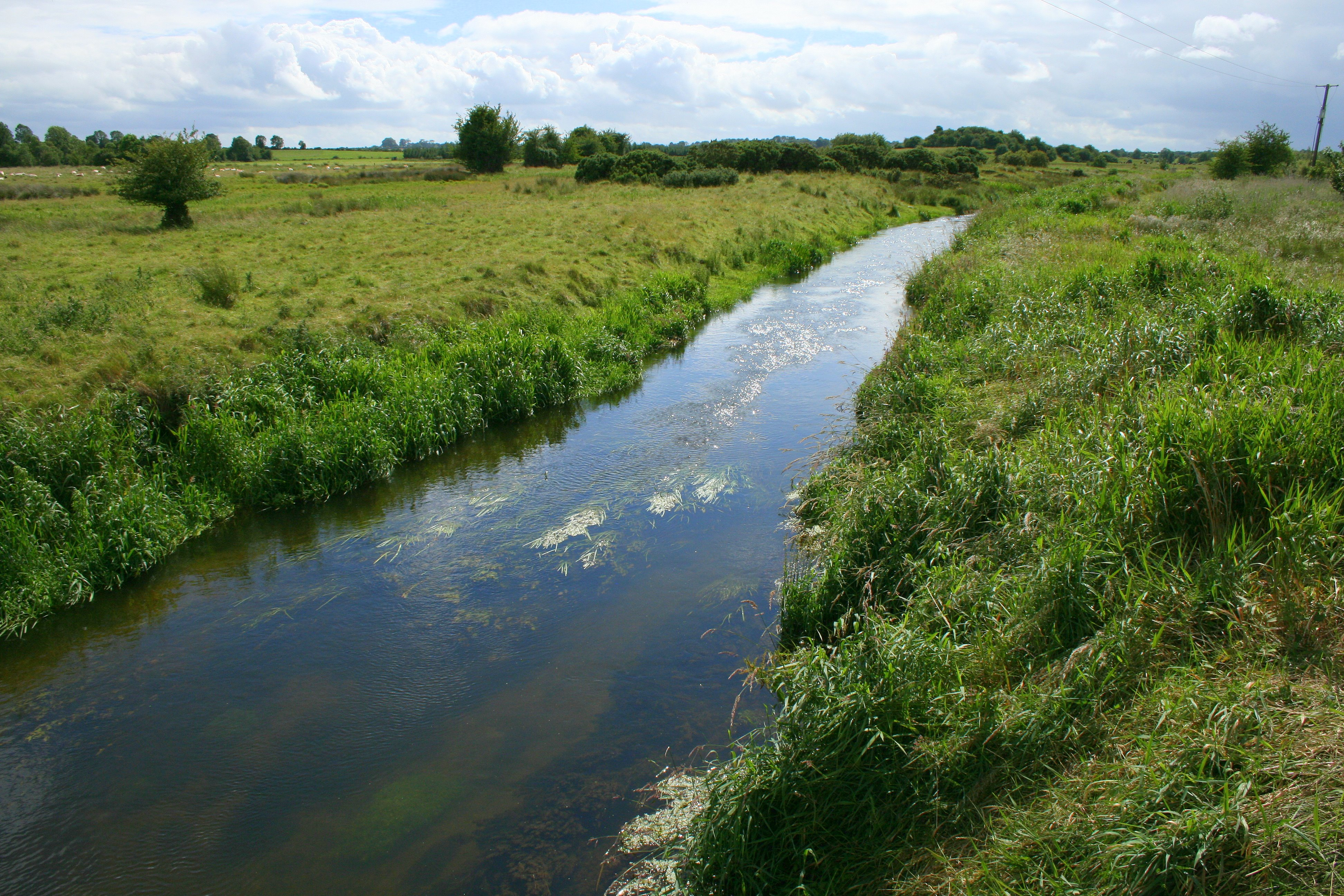
- Goul near Galmoy

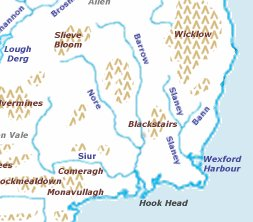
- Map of the source of the Nore, Ireland

- Location of the mouth in Ireland
- Native name: An Ghabhal (Irish)

Location
- Counties: Tipperary, Kilkenny, Laois
- Towns: Johnstown, Galmoy, Durrow

Physical characteristics
- Source: Slieveardagh Hills
  - location: Slieveardagh Hills
  - coordinates: 52°51′04″N 7°26′38″W
  - elevation: 349 m (1,145 ft)
- Mouth: Celtic Sea
  - location: Waterford Harbour, County Waterford
  - coordinates: 52°11′N 6°56′W
  - elevation: 0 m (0 ft)

Basin features
- Progression: River Goul—River Erkina—River Nore
- Bridges: Ballyboodin Bridge

The River Goul (/ˈɡaʊl/; Irish: An Ghabhal) is a river that flows through the counties of Tipperary, Kilkenny and Laois in Ireland. It is a tributary of the River Erkina which is in turn a tributary of the River Nore.

It has its source in the Slieveardagh Hills, approximately six kilometres south of Urlingford. It enters the town from the southeast, passing under Main Street and making its way to the bridge at Urlingford Castle (and Mill). It flows north passing between Johnstown and Galmoy into County Laois before joining the River Erkina several kilometres west of Durrow.

== See also ==
- Rivers of Ireland
