= R693 road (Ireland) =

Road in Ireland

R693 road
- Bóthar R693
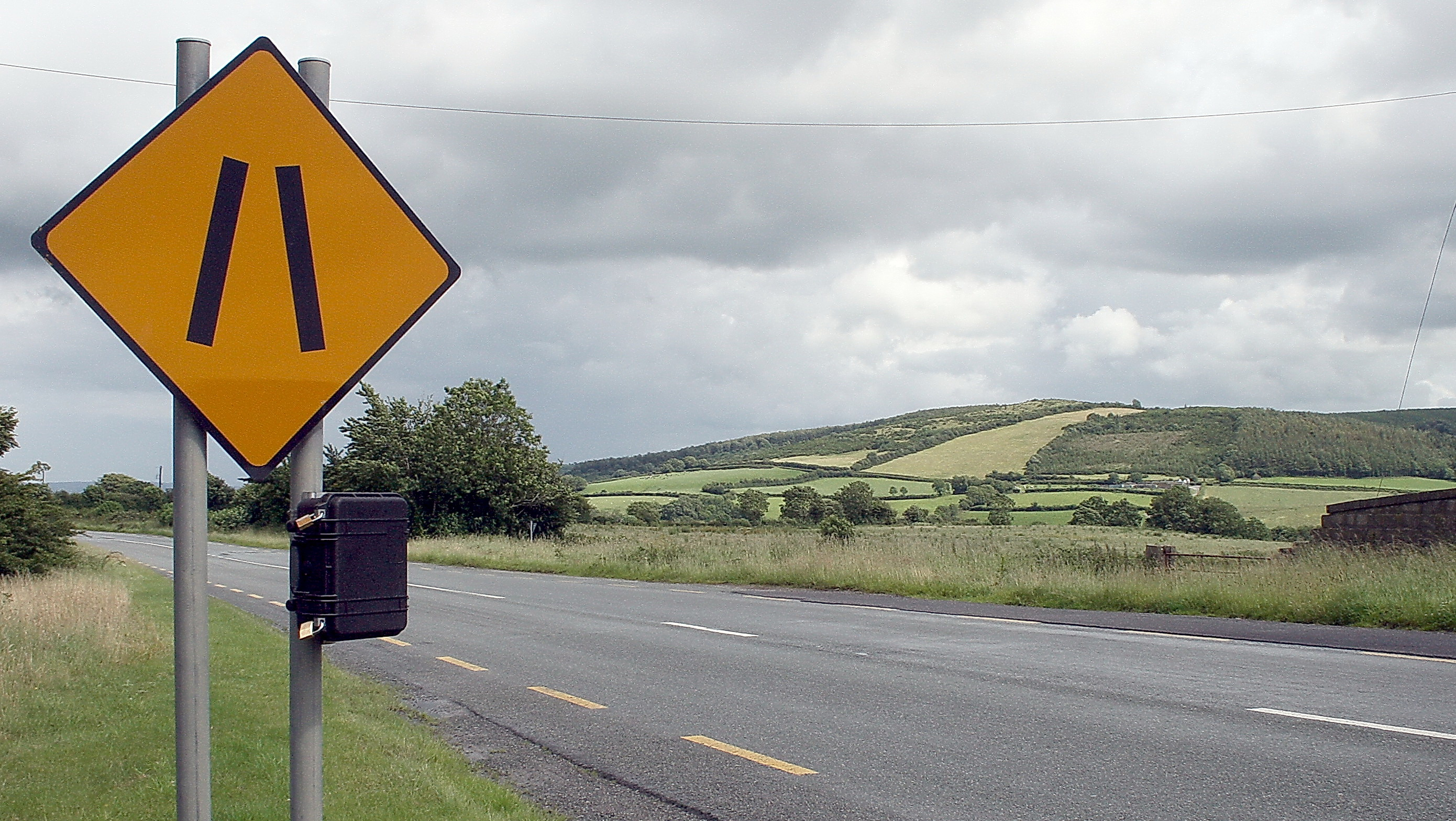
- R693 at Clomantagh, County Kilkenny

Route information
- Length: 29 km (18 mi)

Location
- Country: Ireland
- Primary destinations: County Kilkenny; Urlingford leave the M8; (R435); Clomantagh; Freshford – (R694); Crosses the Arigna River; Terminates in Kilkenny city centre at the N77

Highway system
- Roads in Ireland; Motorways; Primary; Secondary; Regional

The R693 road is a regional road in Ireland linking Urlingford to Kilkenny City, all in County Kilkenny. It passes through the small town of Freshford en route. The road is 29 km (18 mi) long.

== See also ==
- Roads in Ireland
- National primary road
- National secondary road
