= Cantred =

Subdivision of an Irish county

A cantred was a subdivision of a county in the Anglo-Norman Lordship of Ireland between the thirteenth and fifteenth centuries, analogous to the cantref of Wales or the hundred of England. In County Dublin the equivalent unit was termed a serjeanty, while in County Meath and environs it was a barony. The area of a cantred usually corresponded to that of an earlier trícha cét ("thirty hundreds") of Gaelic Ireland, and sometimes to that of a rural deanery in the medieval Irish church. Paul Mac Cotter has "demonstrated the existence of 151 certain cantreds and indicated the probable existence of a further 34." Cantreds were replaced by baronies from the sixteenth century.

== Functions ==
In the Anglo-Norman shires and liberties, the cantred was originally a unit of subinfeudation; a magnate or tenant-in-chief who received a grant from the King of England as Lord of Ireland would typically grant a cantred or half-cantred to a baron as mesne lord, who would hold the chief manor and grant sub-manors to his tenants. Church land within a cantred was excluded from grants. Unlike a knight's fee, there was no military service in the feudal duties of a cantred.

The cantred was used for administrative purposes, with the serjeanty for law enforcement, the eyre for law courts, and collection of scutage and other taxes organised by cantred.

== Supersession ==
Cantreds declined in the fourteenth century as Anglo-Norman power retreated to the Pale. They had fallen into disuse by the sixteenth-century Tudor reconquest of Ireland, when the barony became the subunit of the county. In the east and south, baronies often had the names of older cantreds, though the boundaries often diverged. In the west and north, the new baronies generally had the extent of a former trícha cét, but a different name.
