= Freshford, County Kilkenny =

Village in County Kilkenny, Ireland

Freshford Achadh Úr (Irish)
- Village
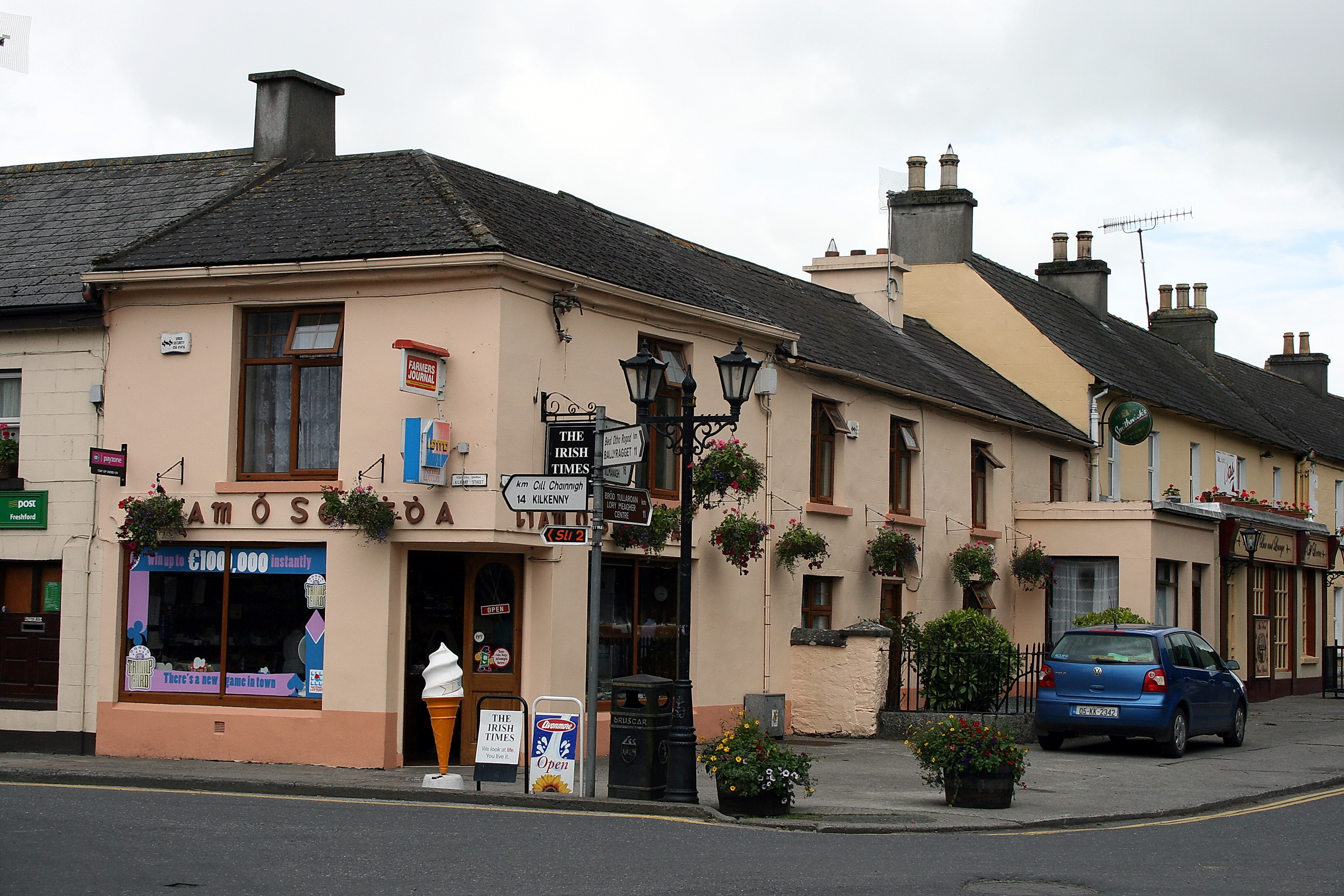

- Location in Ireland
- Coordinates: 52°44′00″N 7°24′00″W
- Country: Ireland
- Province: Leinster
- County: County Kilkenny
- Elevation: 75 m (246 ft)

Population (2022)
  - Total: 593
- Time zone: UTC+0 (WET)
  - Summer (DST): UTC-1 (IST (WEST))
- Irish Grid Reference: S406649

Historical population
Year	Pop.	±%
1821	1,812	—
1831	2,175	+20.0%
1841	2,075	−4.6%
1851	1,076	−48.1%
1861	953	−11.4%
1871	915	−4.0%
1881	733	−19.9%
1891	622	−15.1%
1901	551	−11.4%
1911	446	−19.1%
1926	413	−7.4%
1936	456	+10.4%
1946	474	+3.9%
1951	491	+3.6%
1956	626	+27.5%
1961	656	+4.8%
1966	565	−13.9%
1971	585	+3.5%
1981	747	+27.7%
1986	700	−6.3%
1991	651	−7.0%
1996	632	−2.9%
2002	756	+19.6%
2006	734	−2.9%
2011	685	−6.7%
2016	662	−3.4%
2022	593	−10.4%

Freshford (Irish: Achadh Úr, meaning 'fresh field') is a village in the barony of Crannagh, County Kilkenny, Ireland. It is 13 km north-west of Kilkenny city. The village is in a civil parish of the same name.

== History ==
The village is the site of a monastery dating to the early 7th century. The Irish name achadh úr has historically been anglicised as Aghour (1318), Achure (1480), Achour (1480), Awchoor (1905), and similar.

Towards the end of the 8th century the Ui Duach were driven out and the Ui Bairche reigned again. Then in 836 the Vikings arrived and in one daring raid burnt the Church of St Lachtain. In 899 the death of Ceannfaeladh mac Cormac who was Airchinneach of Achadh occurred. In 1026, the Ui Bairche were defeated by the Leixians and soon after were replaced as chieftains by the O'Braonains, who in turn were forced back towards Castlecomer by the arrival of the Normans.

In the year 1118, a synod, or meeting of bishops, was held at Rathbrasall (Rathbreasail), County Tipperary, which divided Ireland into dioceses. All small dioceses disappeared and Freshford became part of the diocese of Kilkenny, Laois and Offaly.

In 1169 a major battle was fought near Freshford when Dermot McMurrough and his Norman allies defeated Domhnall McGiolla Padraig of Ossory at the pass of Achadh Úr following a three-day battle. There is much speculation as to the exact location of the battle – the late Padraig McCarthaigh was in no doubt—he placed it at Clashacrow. The Norman invasion also brought the Shortalls to Freshford where they built Castles at Ballylarkin, Kilrush, Kiloshulan, and Tubrid. Also, the Purcell family to Lismaine, Clone and Foulksrath, the Mountgarrett family to Ballyragget, Ballyconra, Lodgepark and Balleen, and the Grace family to Tullaroan.

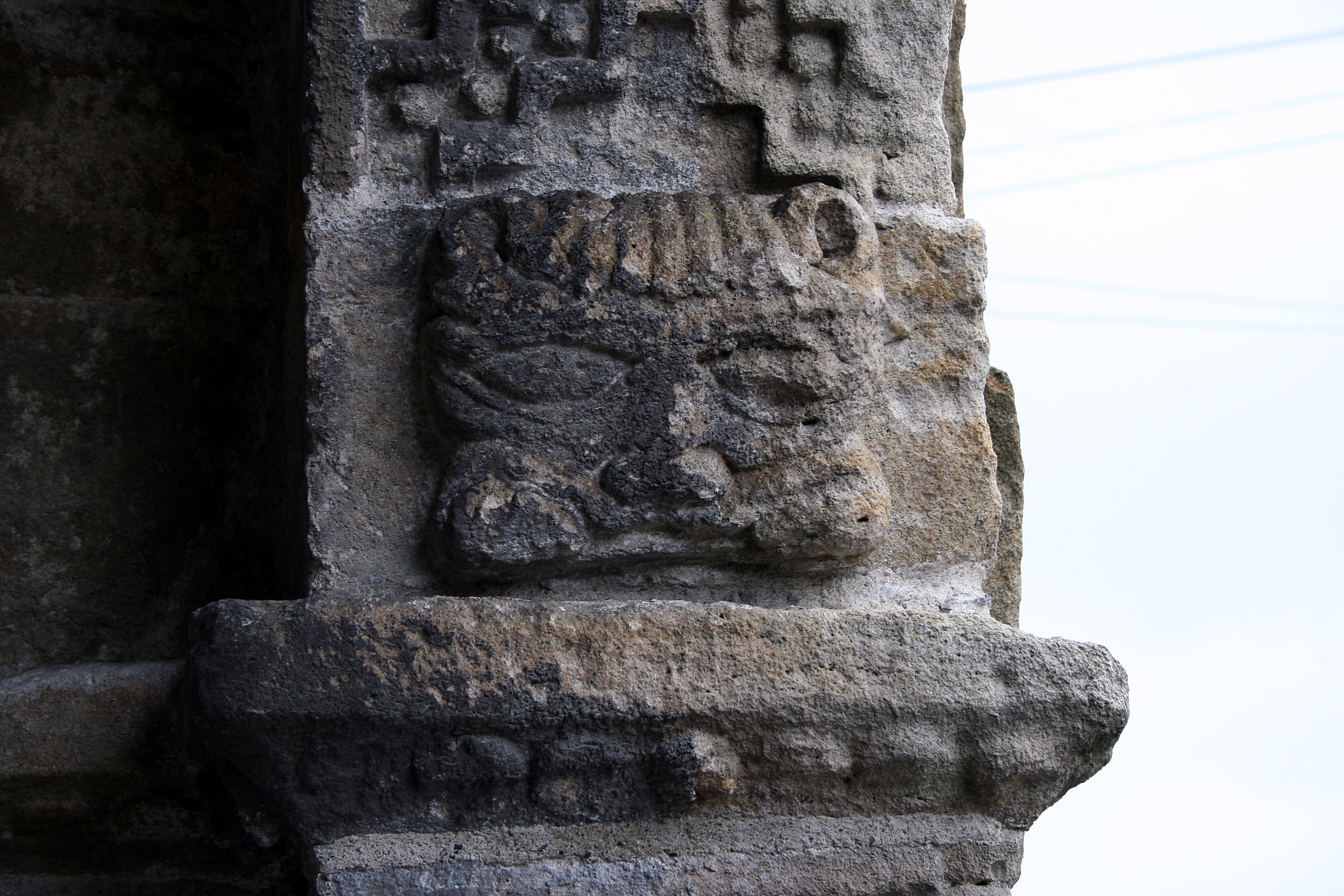
Detail from the portal of St. Lachtain's

The Romanesque doorway of St. Lachtain's Church of Ireland church in Freshford is one of only two such portal designs remaining in the country, the other being at Clonfert. The sandstone doorway is all that is left of the original church which was built around 1100, the present St Lachtain's having been built in 1731. An inscription over the door in Irish translates to 'A prayer for Niamh daughter of Corc and for Mathgamhan Ó Chiarmeic, by whom was made this church'. It is located in the centre of the village on the R693 regional road.

=== Uppercourt Manor ===
The great house of Uppercourt Manor stands on the site of the bishop's palace built at Achadh Úr in 1260 on land which had been granted to the church before 1252.

In 1553, a Protestant bishop, John Bale, was sent to live there. When five of his servants were murdered while saving the hay, the Bishop fled and never returned. After him, the Shee family took over the manor and lived in Uppercourt for 100 years. In 1653, one of Oliver Cromwell's soldiers, Captain Sir George Askew, being owed £200, was given Uppercourt in settlement of the debt and the Shees were forced to leave.

The present house was built in the 1790s. Originally associated with Sir William Morris, the Eyre family came in 1879 and lived at the house until 1918. Stanislaus Eyre sold the house, and 500 acres of the estate, to the Maher brothers of Freshford in 1918. The two brothers, Edward and Michael Maher, were in the building trade and undertook repairs to the house. They also permitted local sporting events to be held on the front lawn also, something that would not previously have been allowed. The men sold the property to the Mill Hill Fathers for a nominal sum in 1932 and it became a secondary school. In 1989, it was sold and used for the storage and restoration of antique furniture. The surrounding farm land was purchased at the same time. The manor house changed hands a few times and was restored. As of 2013, it was being used as a wedding venue. It was sold again in 2015.

=== Freshford Cross ===
The base of the wayside cross at the Square

On the village green stands the base of the Freshford Cross, made of soft sandstone now entirely worn away. When Lucas Shee of Uppercourt died in 1622, his wife, Ellen Butler, erected a cross in his memory at the back entrance to Uppercourt. The street to that entrance is still called Buncrusha or Bohercrussia Street, meaning Bun na Croise or Bothar na Croise in Irish, "Base of the Cross" or "Road of the Cross".

In 1790 Sir William Morris, who came to live in Uppercourt, had the cross removed and re-erected on the green. It bore the following inscription:

"The noble Ellen Butler, wife of Lucas Shee Esq., got this monument made. Pray, traveller, that the souls of both may have eternal rest."

=== Lachtain's well ===
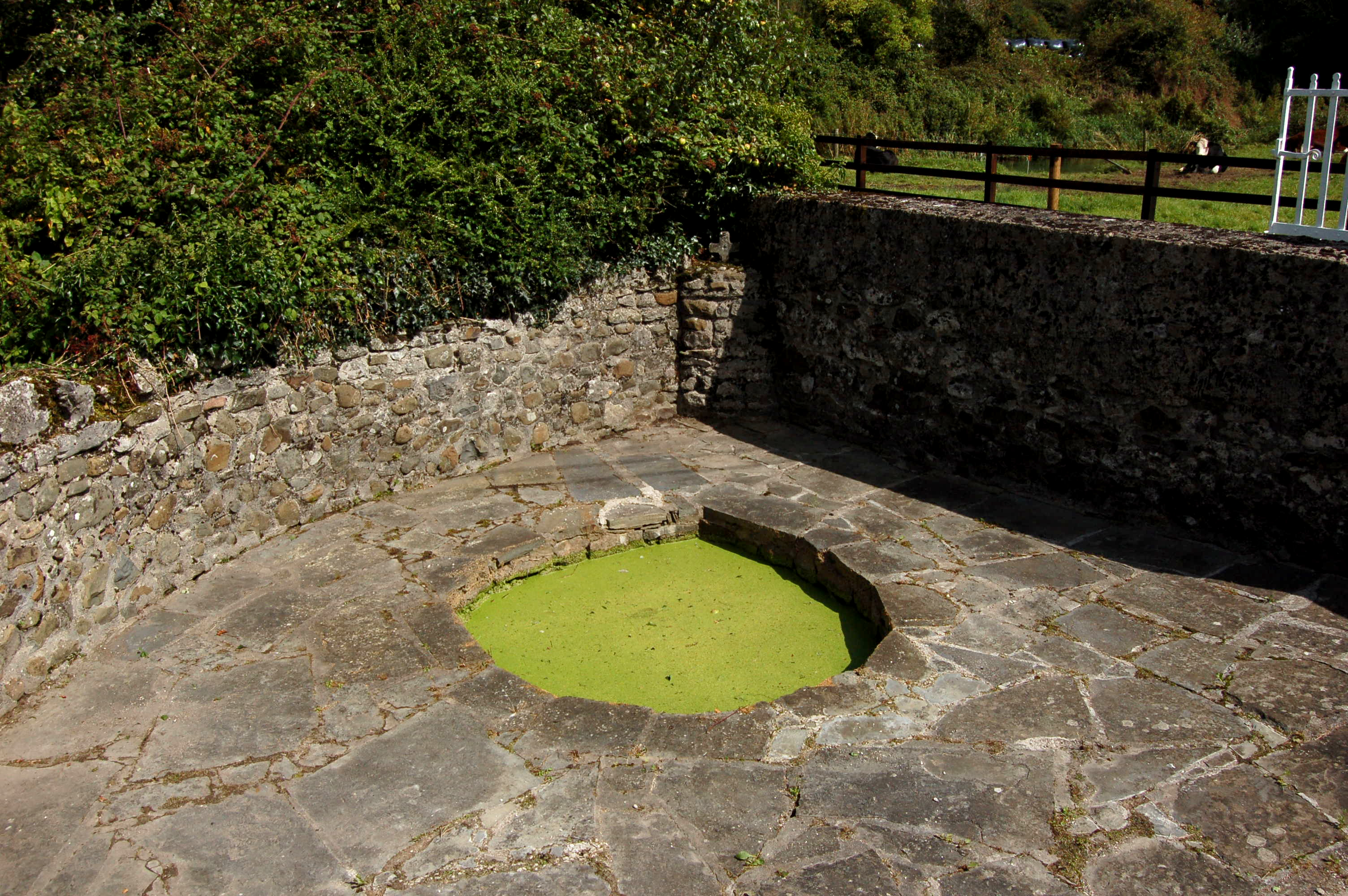
Water pool of St. Lachtain's Well

Saint Lachtain's Well, also known as Toberlachtain (Irish: Tobar Lachtain), is a holy well in Freshford. The holy well, which is in the townland of Moat along the R693 road, is listed in the Record of Monuments and Places (RMP) with record number "KK013-025----". According to local tradition and folklore, several cures were historically attributed to the well. An entry in the Dúchas.ie "Schools' Collection" suggests that patterns were held at the well site until the 19th century.

== Sport ==
The local Gaelic Athletic Association (GAA) club, St Lachtain's GAA, have been in the Kilkenny Senior Hurling Champions twice, in 1961 and 1963. St.Lachtains contested the All-Ireland Intermediate Club Hurling Championship final in 2010 in Croke Park against St.Galls of Antrim.

The Irish Conker Championships were staged for a number of years in Freshford, beginning in 1999.

== People ==
- Dr Joseph Lalor (1811–1886), a reformer of Irish asylums, medical superintendent of the Richmond District Lunatic Asylum and a cousin of revolutionary political leaders James Fintan Lalor and Peter Lalor, was born at Cascade House in Freshford.
- Dr Martin Tobin (born 1951), pulmonologist and academic
- John H. Tierney, a Wisconsin farmer, state legislator and chairman of his town board in Westport, Wisconsin, was a native of Freshford who emigrated in 1851.

== See also ==
- List of abbeys and priories in Ireland (County Kilkenny)
- List of towns and villages in Ireland.
