= Fassadinin =

Barony in County Kilkenny, Ireland

Fassadinin Fásach an Deighnín (Irish) Barony of Fassadinin
- Barony
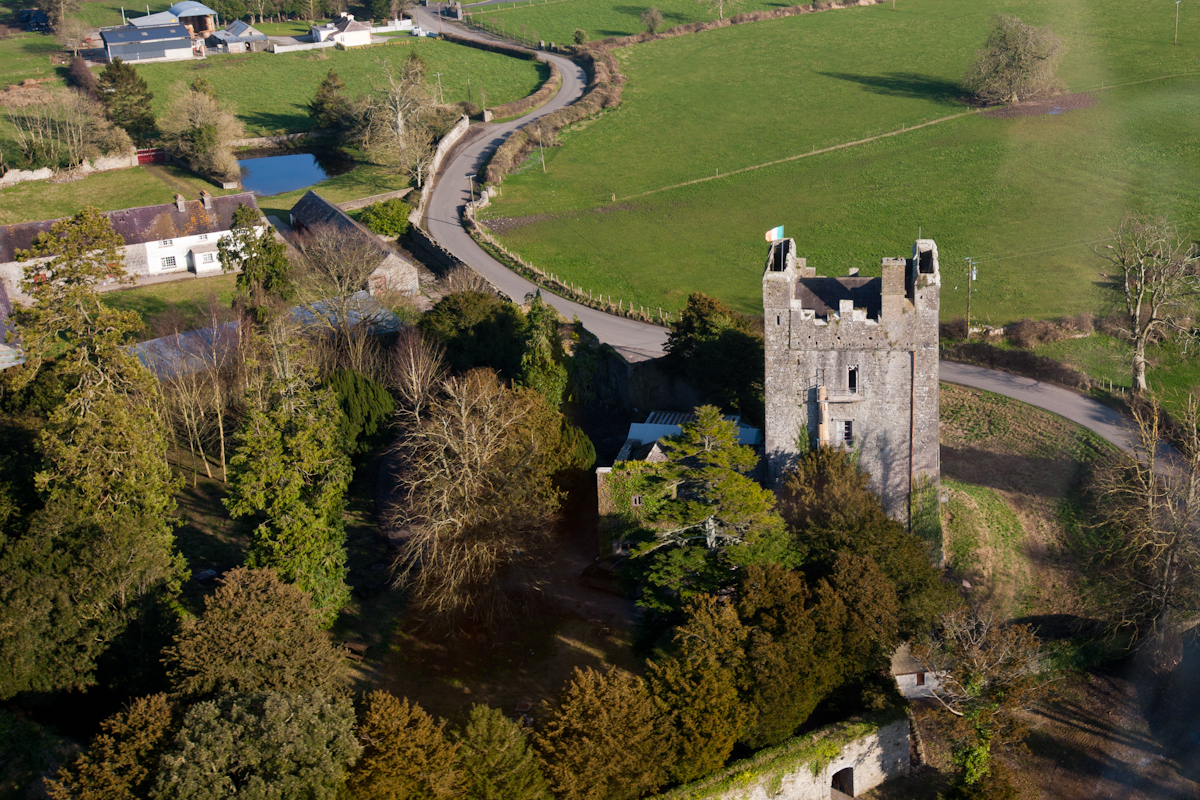
- Foulksrath Castle aerial view.
- Etymology: Wilderness along the Dinin river
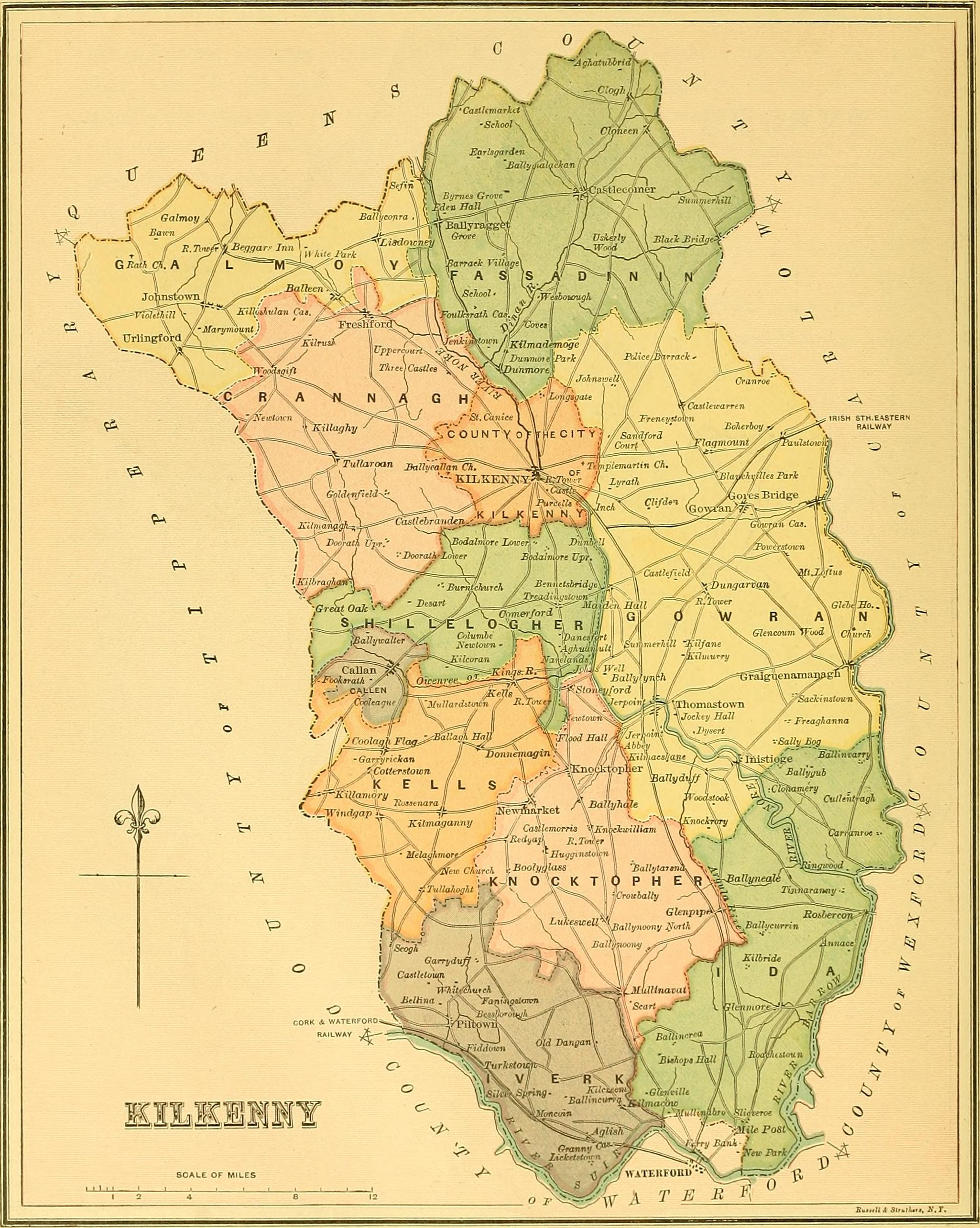
- Map of Fassadinin

- Location in Ireland
- Coordinates: 52.8°N 7.216667°W
- Country: Ireland
- Province: Leinster
- County: County Kilkenny
- Cantred of Odoth: 1358
- Fasaghdenyn and Idoghe: 1587
- Civil parishes: List: Attanagh; Odagh; Castlecomer; Kilmenan; Kilmacar; Kilmademoge; Kilmadum; Coolcraheen; Dysart; Donaghmore; Dunmore; Grangemaccomb; Muckalee; Mayne; Abbeyleix; Mothell; Rathbeagh; Rathaspick; Rosconnell

Government
  - Type: County Council
  - Body: Kilkenny County Council

Area
  - Total: 276.2 km^{2} (106.6 sq mi)

Fassadinin (Irish: Fásach an Deighnín, meaning 'Wilderness along the River Dinin'), sometimes written Fassadining, is a barony in the north of County Kilkenny, Ireland. It is one of 12 baronies in County Kilkenny. The size of the barony is 276.2 square kilometres (106.6 sq mi). There are 19 civil parishes in Fassadinin. The chief town today is Castlecomer. The N78 Kilkenny/Athy road bisects the barony. Fassadinin is currently administered by Kilkenny County Council.

Fassadinin lies at the north of the county, with the baronies of Galmoy and Crannagh to the west (whose chief towns are Galmoy and Freshford), and the baronies of the Kilkenny and Gowran to the south (whose chief towns are Kilkenny and Gowran). It is surrounded on two sides by counties Laois to the north and Carlow to the east.

Foulksrath Castle and Kells Priory are located in Fassadinin.

== History ==
The barony was part of in the historic kingdom of Osraige (Ossory) and was the territory of the Uí Duach (Idough) clan. The name of Fassadinin, in Irish "Fásach an Deighnín", meaning "Wilderness along the Dinan". From Old Irish, "fásach", meaning "uninhabited place, waste, wilderness", of the Dinin River. According to O'Heerin's Topographical Poem (1420) at the time of the Norman invasion the area was the territory of the clan called the Ua Braonáin (O'Brennan) of Uí Duach. Uí Duach was made into the medieval cantred of Odogh or Idogh. In 1358 this Barony was known by its ancient name the "Cantred of Odoth". Ui Duach was also called the cantred of the Comar (from Comar now Castlecomer) which comprised the whole of the president barony of Fassadinin, and a considerable part of Galmoy. The earliest reference to the barony as Fassadinin was in 1587 where it was described as the barony of "Fasaghdenyn and Idoghe".

"Ui-Duach of Ossory of the warm soil,
The fair, wide plane of the Feoir,
Not easily passable is the wood of the plain,
Its protecting chieftain is O'Broenain."

— Ó hUidhrín Topographical Poem Triallam timcheall na Fodla ("Let us wander around Ireland") (1420).

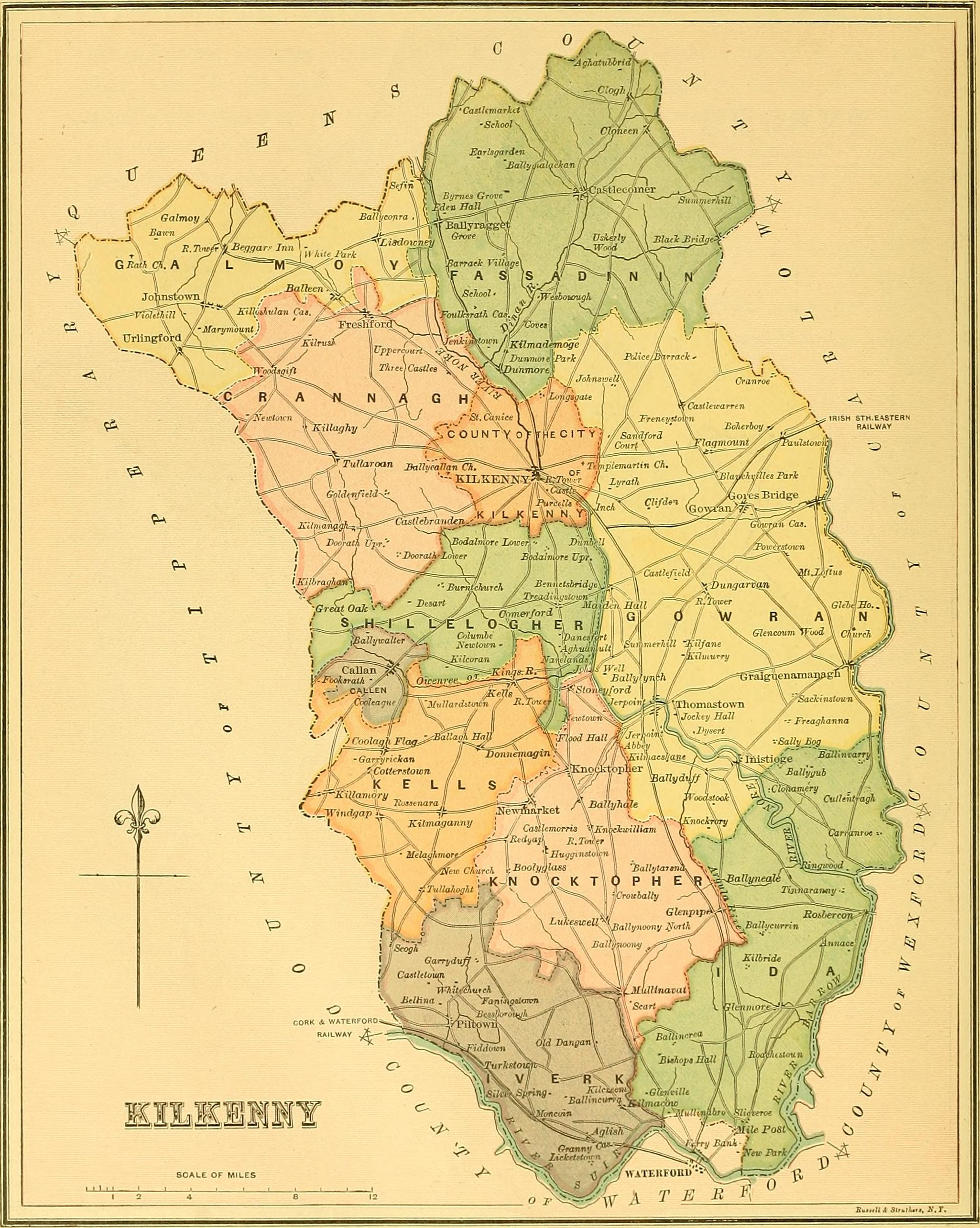
Map of County Kilkenny (1885)

In Edmund Ignatius Hogan's "Description of Ireland, in anno 1598" it was described as the barony of "Fasagh, Denny, and Idogh" and the constables were of the barony of "Fasagh de Myn and Odoghe" or "Fasaghdenya and Odoghe". Fassadining was recorded in the Down Survey (1656), the 1840 Ordnance Survey Map and on Griffith's Valuation (1864).

In 1247, Geoffrey de Fraxino (de la Freyne) held a quarter Knight's fee at Kilmenan in the barony of Fassadinin held previously by a Walter Purcell. The 1608 constables were Robnett Purcell of Foulksrath and William O'Brena of Ballyhomyn (Ballyhimmin). The early families recorded included O'Brena of Rathcally, Purcell of Esker, Purcell of Lysmayne, O'Brena of Uskertye, Farr McDonnogh of Croghtoncle, and Duffe of Crint. The Brennans ruled in this region with remarkable independence and persistence, it was not until 1635 the town and remaining Brennan lands were handed over to Sir Christopher Wandesforde. The Wandesfords were based in Fassadining.

In the 18th century County Kilkenny consisted of the Liberties of Kilkenny and of Callan and the baronies of Galmoy, Lower Ossory, Fassadinig, Cranagh, Shellilogher, Gowran, Kells, Knocktopher, Ida, Igrin, Iverk and Ibercon. By the 19th century these were restructured into the baronies of Callan, Crannagh, Fassadinin, Galmoy, Gowran, Ida, Iverk, Kells, Knocktopher, and Shillelogher. Today, the county is subdivided into 12 baronies. These include Kilkenny in the centre of the county, and clockwise from north of the county, Fassadinin, Gowran, Ida, Kilculliheen, Iverk, Knocktopher, Kells, Callan, Shellilogher, Crannagh, Galmoy.

== Geography ==
Fassadinin contains the towns of Ballyragget and Castlecomer, and the settlements of Odagh, Clogh, Jenkinstown, Coan, Coolcullen and Coolbaun. Fassadinin is made up of 19 civil parishes, including Attanagh, Odagh, Castlecomer, Kilmenan, Kilmacar, Kilmademoge, Kilmadum, Coolcraheen, Dysart, Donaghmore, Dunmore, Grangemaccomb, Muckalee, Mayne, Abbeyleix, Mothell, Rathbeagh, Rathaspick and Rosconnell. These civil parishes include 126 townlands (See List of townlands in County Kilkenny).

The River Dinin (Dinan) flows through Fassadinin. Fassadinin also contains Castlecomer Woods and Jenkinstown Wood, a well named 'Lady's Well' and Foulksrath Castle. Parts of the civil parish were in the poor law unions of Castlecomer, Kilkenny, and Urlingford. In the Gaelic Athletic Association in Kilkenny, St Martin's GAA club has a catchment area which is roughly comprehended by the barony.

Today, Fassadinin is part of the Roman Catholic diocese of Ossory and the Church of Ireland diocese of Cashel and Ossory.

== See also ==
- Barony (county division)
- List of baronies of Ireland
- List of townlands of County Kilkenny
