= Dunmore Cave =

Limestone cave in County Kilkenny, Ireland

Coordinates: 52°44′2″N 7°14′48″W

- Dearc Fearna
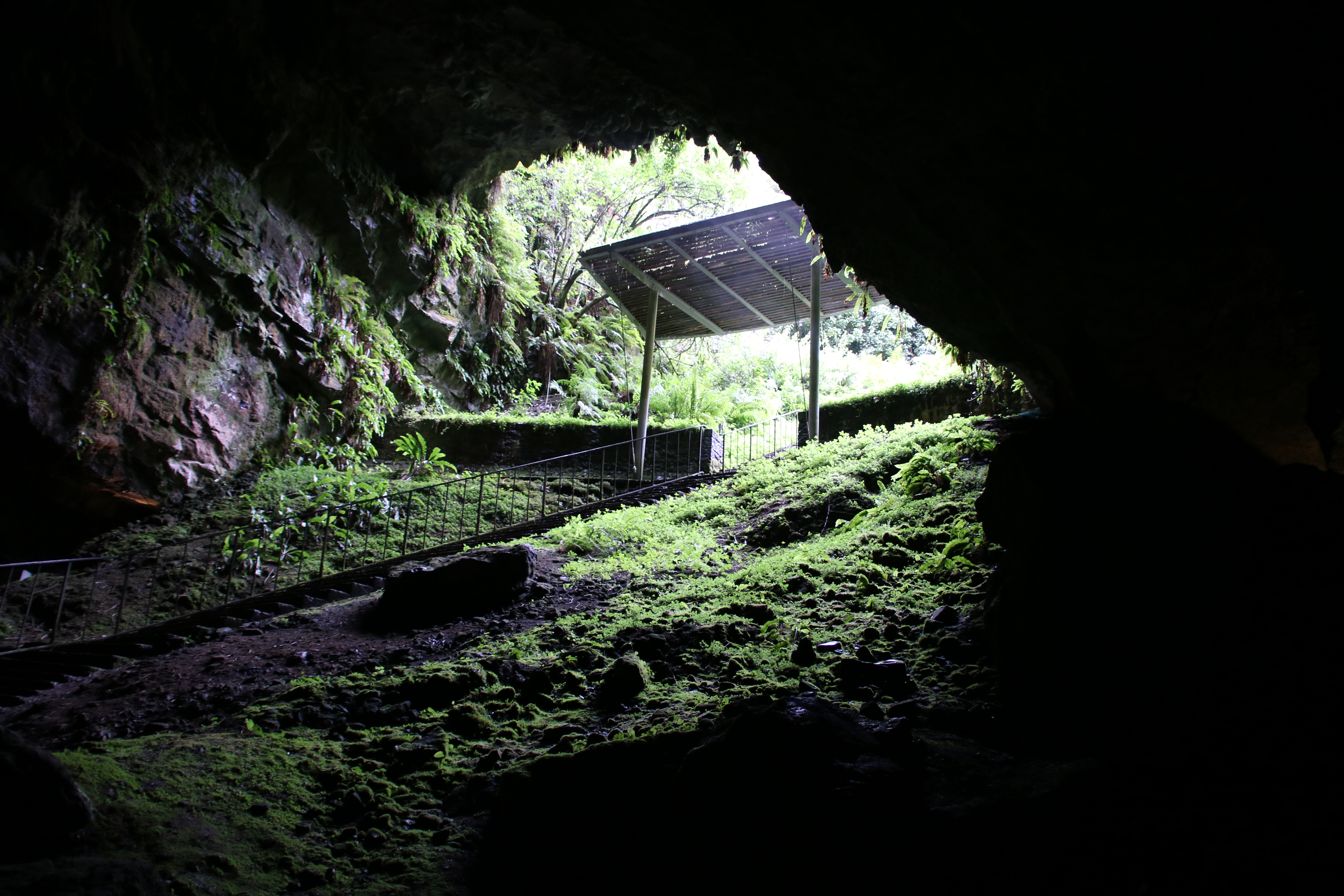
- Cave entrance
- Interactive map of Dunmore Cave
- Location: Castlecomer Road, County Kilkenny
- Depth: 150 feet (46 m)
- Length: 310 m (1,030 ft)
- Geology: Carboniferous Limestone
- Entrances: 1
- Access: Show cave access only

Dunmore Cave (from Irish Dún Mór 'great fort') is a limestone solutional cave in Ballyfoyle, County Kilkenny, Ireland. It is formed in Lower Carboniferous (Viséan) limestone of the Clogrenan Formation. It is a show cave open to the public, particularly well known for its rich archaeological discoveries and for being the site of a Viking massacre in 928.

== Show cave ==
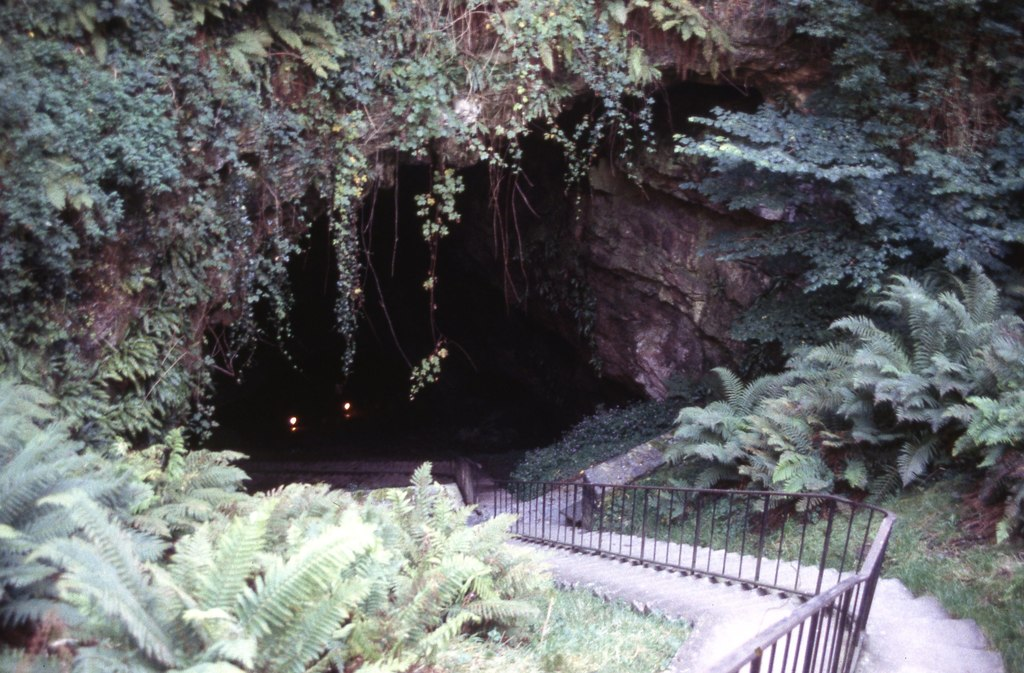
Entrance to Dunmore Cave, pictured in 1996

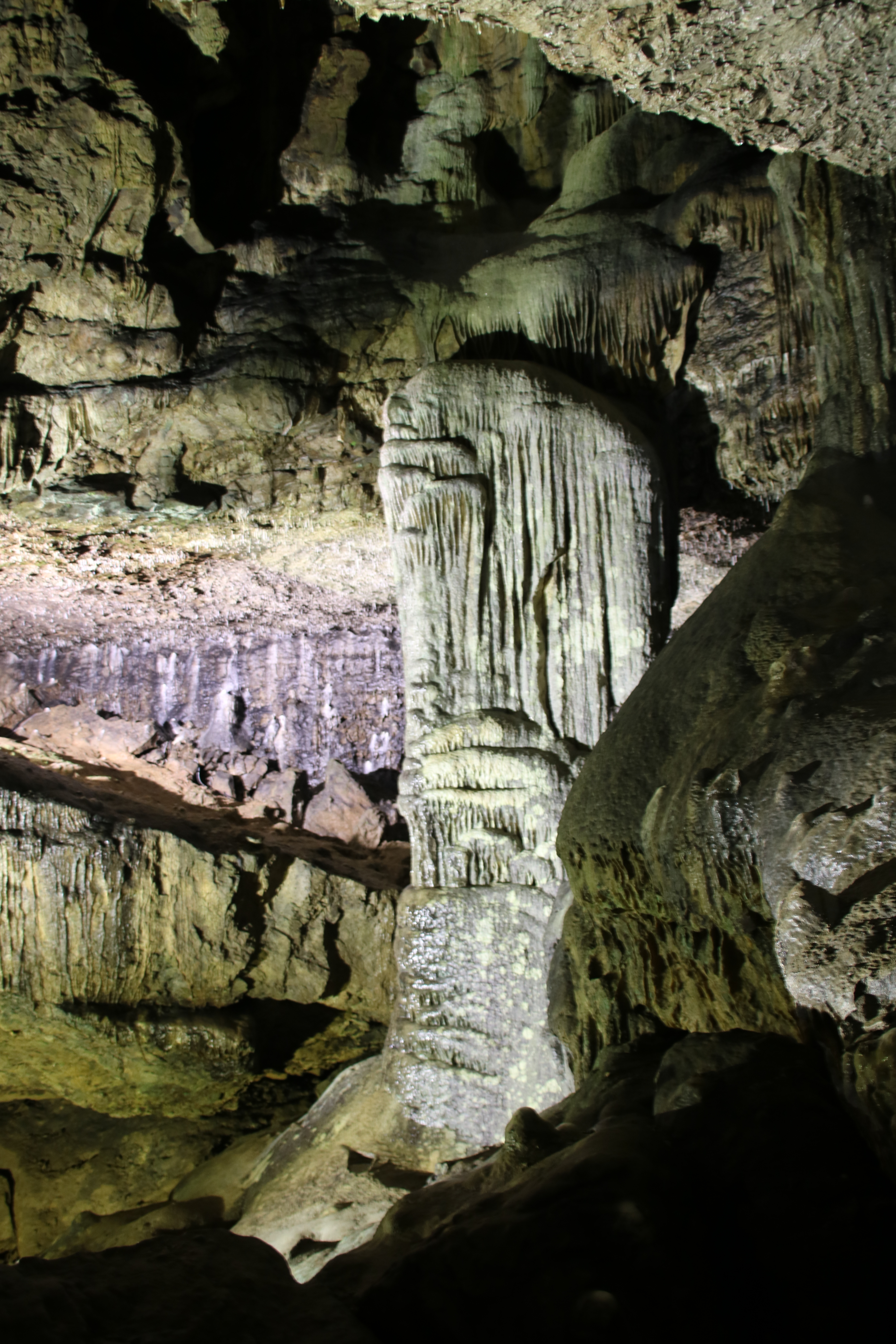
The "Market cross", one of the large calcite formations.

The caves are located to the east of and close to the N78 Kilkenny–Castlecomer road and about 11 km (6.8 mi) north of Kilkenny City. The entrance is in the townland of Mohill, where a tourist centre has been established at the site. Overlooking the River Dinan valley, it is found in an isolated outcrop of limestone on the Castlecomer Plateau.

Dunmore is not one of the largest of Ireland's caves. It contains just a quarter of a mile of passages and at its deepest point, it descends to 150 ft (46 m), but it possesses some fine calcite formations. The most spectacular is the Market Cross, a distinctly cross-shaped column over 19 ft (5.8 m) high.

=== Development ===
Dunmore Cave was designated a National Monument by the Commissioners of Public Works in 1944, but development as a show cave with visitor centre and tours didn't begin until 1967, at the behest of respected archaeologist and spelaeologist J. C. Coleman. The cave was closed in 2000 for archaeological work and redevelopment, and reopened in 2003.

== History ==
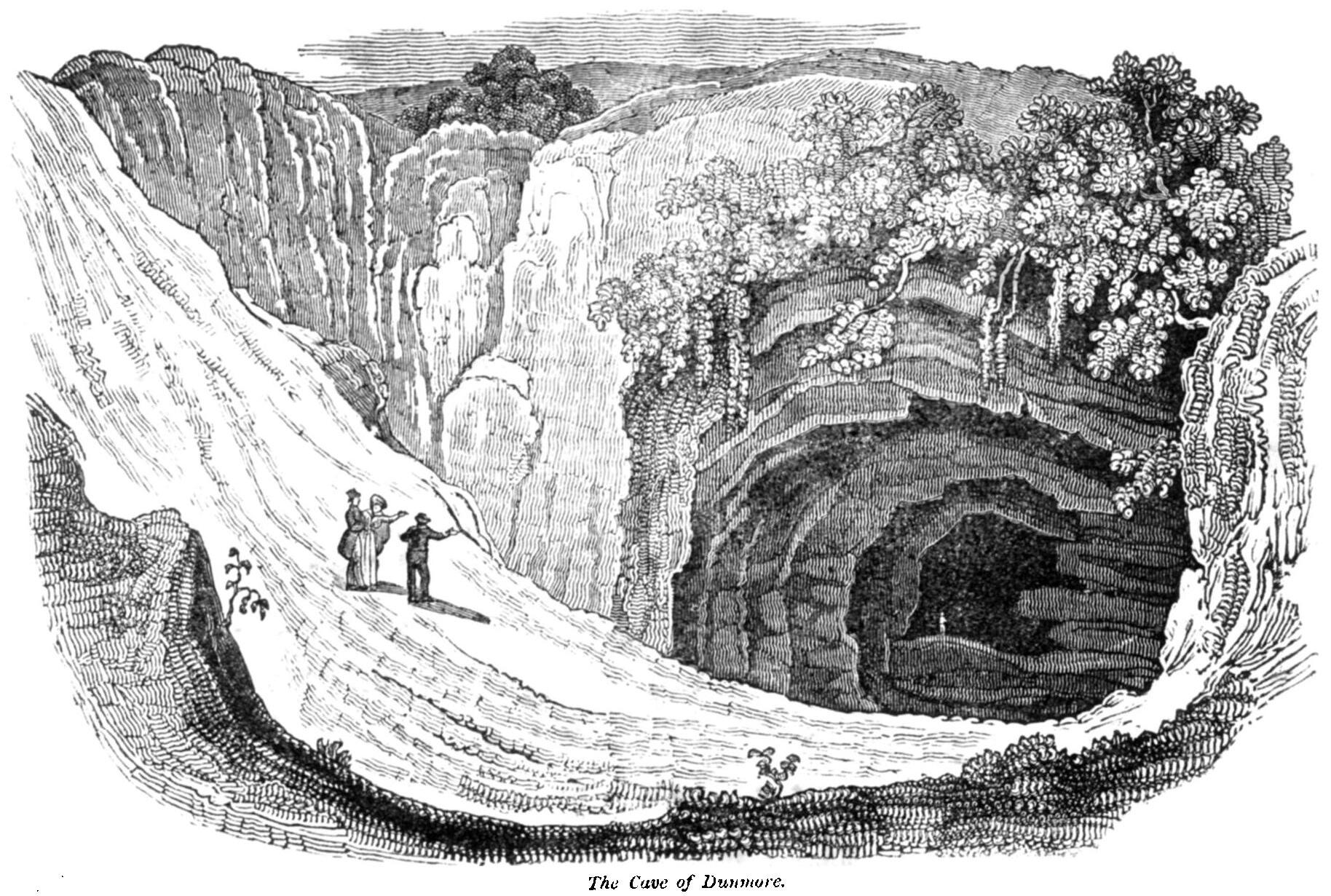
The cave featured in the Dublin Penny Journal, 1832

The earliest historical reference to the cave is to be found in the Triads of Ireland, dating from the 14th to the 19th century, where "Úam Chnogba, Úam Slángae and Dearc Fearna" are listed under the heading, "the three darkest places in Ireland". The last, meaning the "Cave of the Alders," is generally thought to be the present Dunmore Cave, while the first two translate as the caves of Knowth and Slaney. It is not known which exact system of caves/passage tombs near the river Slaney is being referred to, with the most likely, those at Baltinglass. Other sources translate the listed locations as Rath Croghan, the cave or crypt of Slane and the "Cave of the Ferns".

In the Annals of the Four Masters, dated to the 17th century, Dearc Fearna was recorded as the site of a great Viking massacre in 928 AD:

"Godfrey Uí Ímair, with the foreigners of Ath Cliath, demolished and plundered Dearc Fearna, where one thousand persons were killed in this year as is stated in the quatrain:

Nine hundred years without sorrow, twenty-eight, it has been proved, 'Since Christ came to our relief, to the plundering of Dearc-Fearna."

Gofraith, ua h-Iomhair, co n-Gallaibh Atha Cliath, do thoghail & do orgain Derce Fearna,
airm in ro marbhadh míle do dhaoinibh an bhliadhain-si, amhail as-berar isin rann,

Naoi c-céd bliadhain gan doghra,
a h-ocht fichet non-dearbha,
o do-luidh Criost dár c-cobhair

co toghail Derce Ferna.

While the human remains found in the cave are thought to be victims of the Viking massacre, this has not been reliably confirmed. Many of the remains belong to women and children, and it is hypothesised that they are the bodies of people hiding in the cave who were unable to leave when the Vikings tried to smoke them out, dying from asphyxiation.

=== Archaeological study ===
The earliest writings on the cave of an archaeological nature came from the bishop George Berkeley, whose report dated 1706 detailed a visit that he made to the cave as a boy. The essay was not published until 1871. In 1869 Arthur Wynne Foot, a physician, made an archaeological visit to the cave with Rev. James Graves and Peter Burtchaell and discovered large quantities of human remains, which they collected. In his reports, Foot meticulously documented his findings, and culled references from the writings of researchers over the preceding 120 years.

In 1999, a hoard of 43 silver and bronze items was discovered in a rocky cleft deep in the cave. Archaeologists dated this hoard, consisting of silver, ingots and conical buttons woven from fine silver, to 970 AD.
