= Slany =

Slaný or Slany (pronounced [ˈslaniː]; feminine form Slaná is a Czech and Slovak surname. It is derived from the Czech–Slovak word slaný for "salty." It may be a metonymic occupational name for a producer or seller of salt. Notable people with the name include:

- Hans Erich Slany (1926–2013), German designer
- John Slany (died 1632), English merchant and ship builder

== See also ==
- Slana (disambiguation)
- Slane (disambiguation)
- Slaney
