= Aughamucky =

Village in County Kilkenny, Ireland

Aghamucky Áth an Mhuicí
- Village
- Location in Ireland
- Coordinates: 52°48′26″N 7°09′50″W
- Country: Ireland
- Province: Leinster
- County: County Kilkenny

Government
  - Dáil Éireann: Carlow–Kilkenny
- Time zone: UTC+0 (WET)
  - Summer (DST): UTC-1 (IST (WEST))

Aughamucky, officially Aghamucky (Irish: Áth an Mhuicí), is a small village in County Kilkenny, Ireland. It is off the N78 road, about 3 kilometres east from Castlecomer.

== Geography ==
The area around Aughamucky is of great interest and, as a result of the abundance of peat and coal, also has a wide diversity of unique flora and fauna.

The roads in Aughamucky are the Yellow road, leading to Castlecomer, the Dairy Road leading to Smithstown, the Bog Road leading to Monegore Bog (where locals dug for peat as a supplementary source of fuel), and the Rock Lane which leads to the river (known locally as The Tunnel) and the Rock coal mine.

The crossroads where all these roads meet is today known as Ryan's Cross. This is named after a mining family of Ryans who worked in the pits for hundreds of years. In past times, it was common for timber boards to be laid on the road at the crossroads so that the people could meet on summer evenings to dance on the boards.

== History ==
In 1637, about 120 square kilometres (30,000 acres) including Aughamucky were granted to Sir Christopher Wandesford by his cousin, Thomas Wentworth, 1st Earl of Strafford, the King's Lord Deputy of Ireland. Wandesforde laid out the town of Castlecomer. This became Ireland's first town built in stone and mortar. The Wandesford family started the coal mine there. In 1640 the first seam was opened.

The coal mines, which supplied anthracite coal, were known as the Deerpark Mines (the largest), The Vera (named after Vera Wandesforde) and The Rock near Glenmullen in Aughamucky.

In 1875 it was estimated that the seam had produced as much as 15 million tons of coal – a large amount for such a small seam. Despite this physical achievement on behalf of the miners, their standard of living did not improve over the centuries.

Until the 1950s, water was carried by hand from the local wells. Buckets of water were carried a few miles by the local children for washing and drinking purposes. One of these wells was known as "Crennans well" which produced a high quality of drinking water. The miners small three roomed cottages which could be homes to ten plus people were thatched with rushes or reeds from the local area, sanitation did not exist, transport to mass, shopping and visiting was either by foot or by horse/donkey or "jennit" and cart.

== Culture ==
Many of the residents are descendants of the coal miners who worked in the mines for the Wandesford family over a period of 300 years. It is close to the Monegore peat bog, which over the centuries provided the local community with peat as fuel for heating and cooking.

In the 1901 Census the population of the Aughamucky area was shown as 126. Of the 24 families who are shown, the head of families of the Ryans, Currys and the Coogans were shown as working in the mines. Ten family heads were recorded as farmers. The remaining family heads were classified as labourers working presumably on the farms. The majority of the farmers were shown as members of the Church of Ireland.

== See also ==
- List of towns and villages in Ireland
