= Castlecomer Plateau =

Upland area in south east Ireland

- Plateau
- Location within Ireland
- Coordinates: 52.81°N 7.16°W
- Location: County Kilkenny, Ireland extending into Laois and Carlow.
- Formed by: Baurnafea fault
- Geology: Sandstone/shale

Area
  - Total: 640 square kilometres (250 sq mi)
- Elevation: 334 m (1,096 ft)
- Highest elevation: 334 (Rossmore Plateau)
- Surface elevation: 120 m (390 ft)

The Castlecomer Plateau, or 'South Leinster Coalfield', is an upland area in the North of County Kilkenny, Ireland, extending into County Laois and County Carlow at its northern edge. The plateau is bounded on the east and south by the R448 regional road, on the west by the N77. The River Nore flows southward past the plateau's western flank, the River Barrow past its eastern flank and it is dissected by the River Dinin, which flows through Castlecomer itself.

The landscape consists of a large area of upland lying between the river valleys of the Barrow and Nore. The eastern section, which is the larger and more elevated part of the plateau is known as the Rossmore Plateau, after the village of Rossmore, County Laois, which is situated at the northeastern extremity near the highest point on the plateau (334 m) and is just five kilometres (3.1 mi) from the town of Carlow below, in the valley of the River Barrow.

The topography and soils of the area have long influenced its history. The plateau has remained sparsely populated but has also provided a refuge for the dispossessed. One of Ireland's few commercial coal deposits occurred in this upland area which has meant that it is one of the few places in Ireland that has a coal-mining history. The area is difficult for agriculture with lower temperatures, more exposure and heavier, wetter soils than the surrounding lowlands. However it has proved excellent for forestry and there are extensive plantations of Sitka spruce at the higher elevations.

The area falls into the domains of councils including County Kilkenny, County Laois and County Carlow. Parts of the area fall within the Barrow and River Special Areas of Conservation. In the barony of Fassadinin, historically it was part of the historic kingdom of Osraige (Ossory) and was the territory of the Uí Duach (Idough) clan.

== Etymology ==
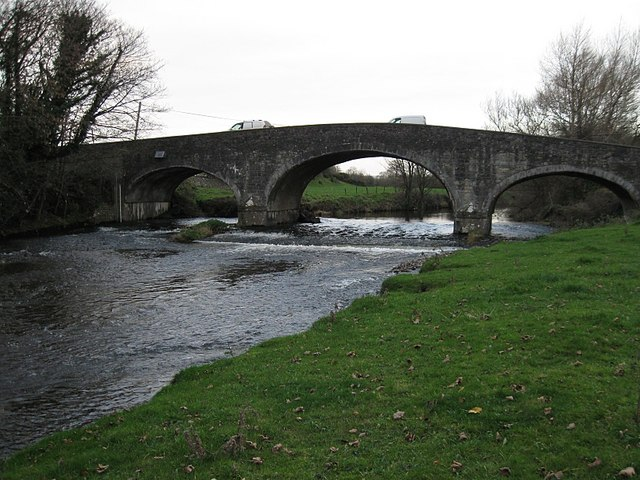
The Dinin river and bridge, on the N77 north of Kilkenny City.

The etymology of Castlecomer, in Irish language Caisleán an Chomair, means "the Castle at the confluence of the Waters". From Middle Irish caislén, from Old Irish caisel (from Anglo-Norman castel, from Latin castellum) + -án meaning castle (fortified building).The "waters" referring to the rivers Dinin (Dinan), Brokagh and Cloghogue meet, and the "castle" refers to the Norman motte and castle built in 1171 by William Marshal, 1st Earl of Pembroke.

== Geography ==
The plateau, with an area of 640 square kilometres (250 sq mi), is in the southeastern of the Central Plain of Ireland. It is almost circular, except to the south-west where it is cut away to form the Dinin River Valley. The centre of the plateau is a topographical and geological basin with an elevation of 120 metres (390 ft). The higher topographical features have an elevation of over 300 metres (980 ft). The main part of the plateau is drained by the Upper and Lower Dinin rivers with join south of Castlecomer. The plateau consists almost completely of limestone with sedimentary rocks of various types and ages. with the centre of the plateau.

== Climate ==
The climate of Kilkenny, like the climate of Ireland, is a changeable oceanic climate with few extremes. It is defined as a temperate oceanic climate, or Cfb on the Köppen climate classification system. Kilkenny lies in plant Hardiness zone 9. Weatherwise, Kilkenny is generally representative of wide river valleys in the region with low temperatures on cloudless nights, and is significant in that it records some of the highest summer and lowest winter temperatures in Ireland.

== Resources ==
=== Sources ===
- Fiontar (2008). "Placenames Database of Ireland". logainm.ie. Department of Arts, Heritage, Regional Rural and Gaeltacht Affairs of the Government of Ireland.
- Kilkenny County Council (2018). "Castlecomer Local Area Plan 2018". kilkenny.ie. Kilkenny: Kilkenny County Council.
- Ó hUidhrín, Giolla na Naomh; Ó Dubhagáin, Seán Mór (1851). O'Donovan, John (ed.). The tribes and territories of ancient Ossory; comprising the portions of O'Heerin's and O'Dugan's topographical poems which relate to the families of that district. Dublin: J. O'Daly. ISBN 978-1-143-94749-0.
