= Aughatubbrid =

Townland in County Kilkenny, Ireland

Coordinates: 52°52′N 7°10′W

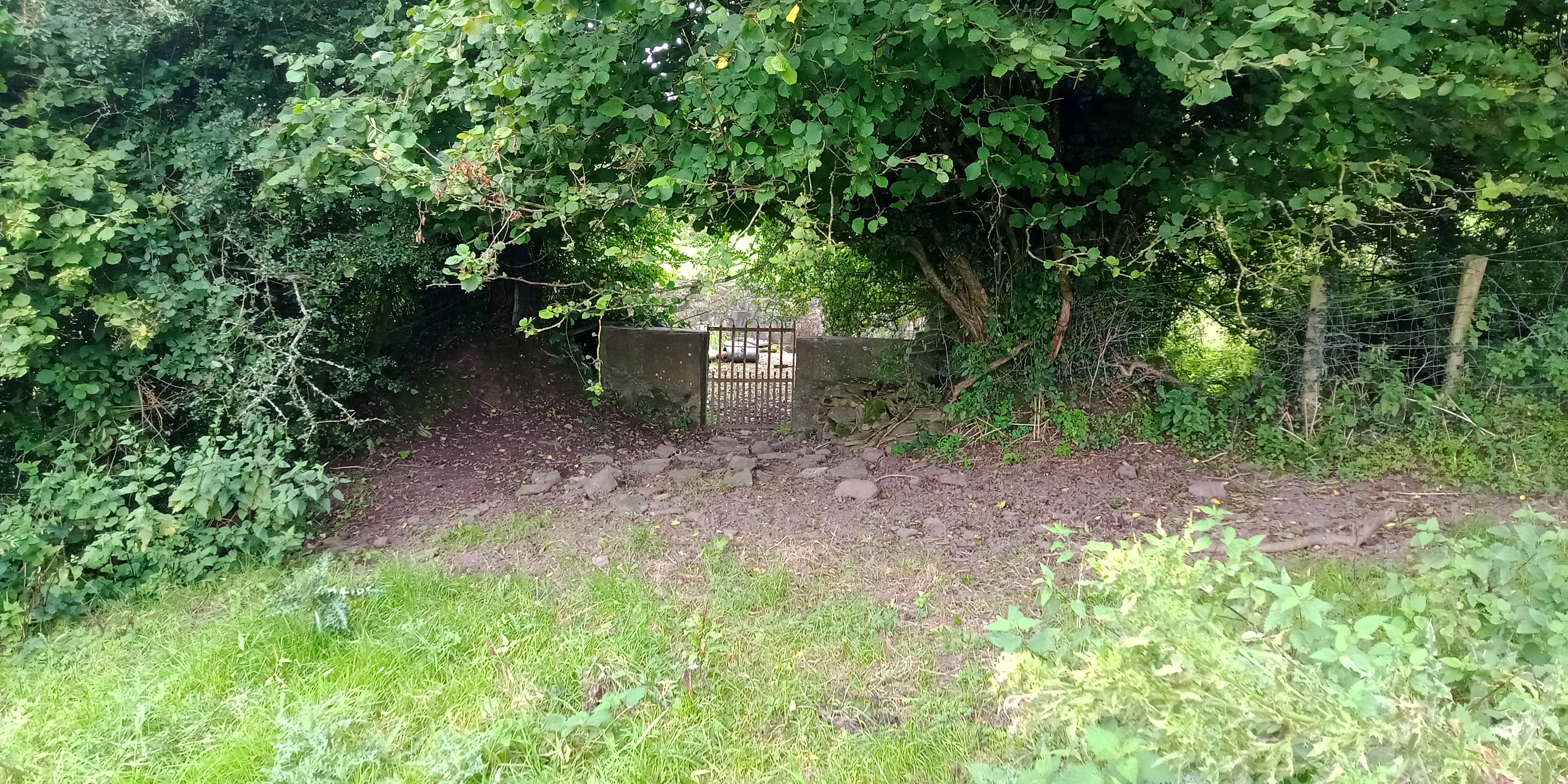
Entrance near graveyard and well site in Aughatubbrid

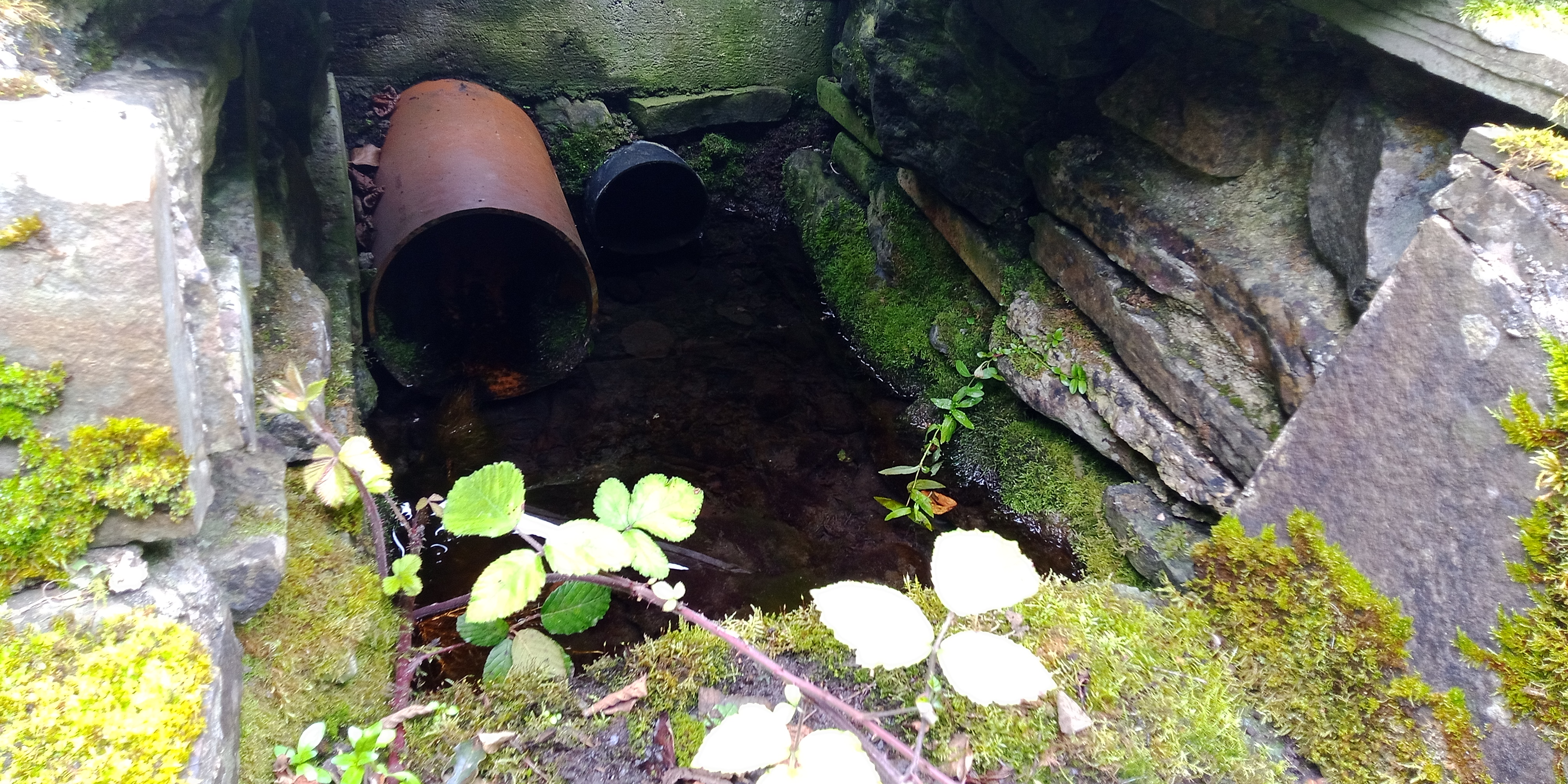
Water source at Church Well

Aughatubbrid (Irish: Achadh Tiobraide), also known as Chatsworth, is a townland in County Kilkenny, Ireland. The townland, which has an area of approximately 6.63 square kilometres (2.56 sq mi), is in the civil parish of Castlecomer. The village and townland of Clogh is to the east. As of the 2011 census, Aughatubbrid had a population of 331 people.

The existence of wells in Aughatubbrid is referenced in the townland's Irish name, which translates to "field of the well" or "field of the spring". The name can be traced back to 1594 as Aghetobbir. One such well, known as "Church Well", was previously considered to be a holy well, and patterns were held there annually in September until at least 2016. The holy well site is recorded in the Record of Monuments and Places (RMP) with number "KK002-001003-". Church Well takes its name from a former church in the area. The site of this former church lies 80m northwest of the holy well and has RMP number "KK002-001001-".
