= Dinin =

Dinin may refer to:

- River Dinin, Ireland
- Dinin Do'Urden, a Forgotten Realms character
