= Foulksrath Castle =

Castle in Ireland

Coordinates: 52.749614°N 07.315992°W

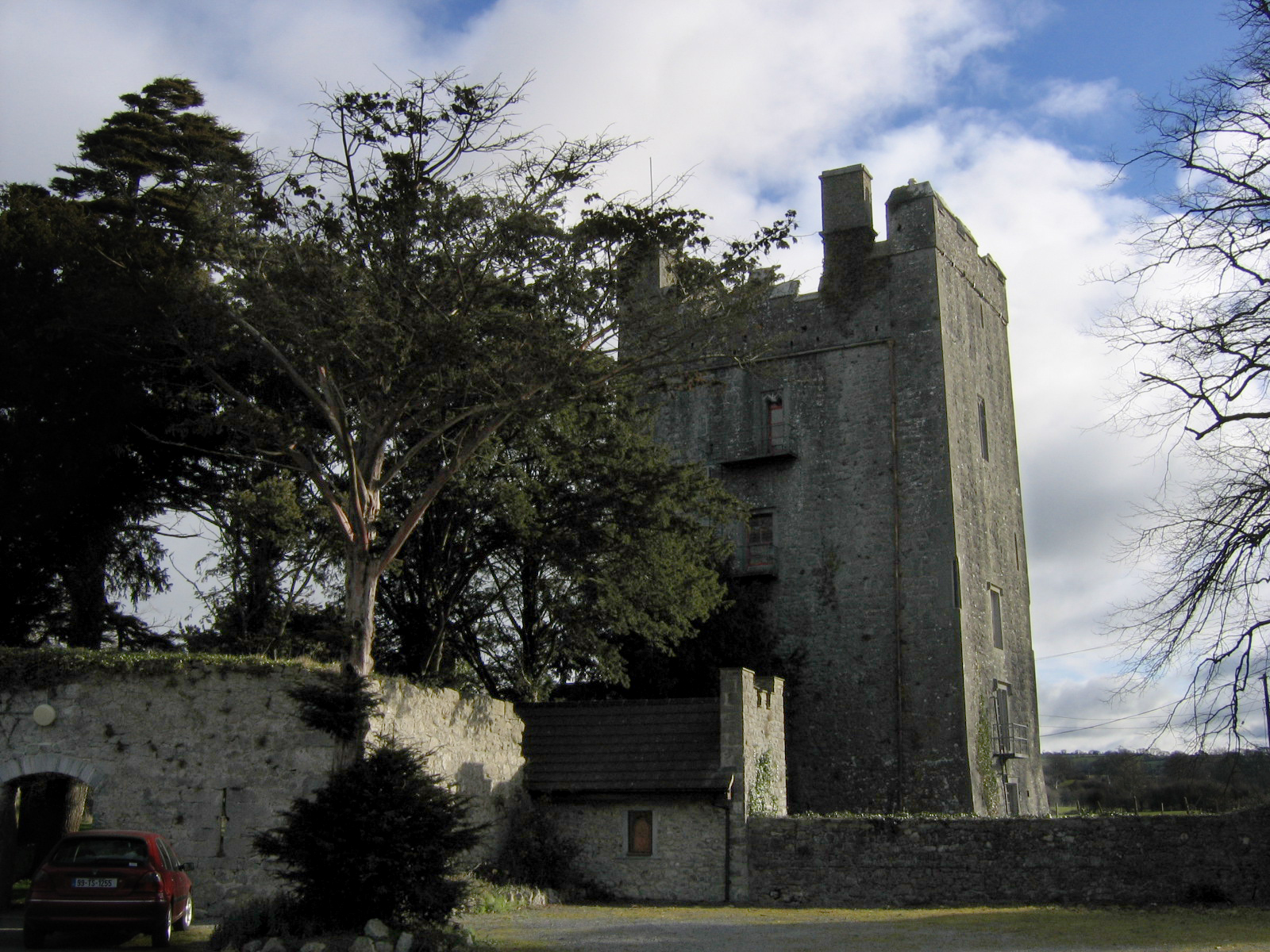
Foulksrath Castle

Foulksrath Castle (Irish: Caislean Ratha) is a 14th-century Anglo-Norman tower house located in Jenkinstown in County Kilkenny, Ireland.

== History ==
The castle is closely associated with both the De Frene and Purcell families. The estate and original fortified and moated dwelling were first built in 1349 and occupied by the De Frene family and it is thought that the castle derives its name from Fulco De Frene (d. 1349) who was in the military service of Edward III and fought at the Battle of Crecy and the Siege of Calais. In the early 15th century the current castle was built by the Purcell family, relatives to the De Frene's, after the estate came into their possession.

The Purcells sided with the Royalists during the English Civil War and had their estate confiscated by Cromwell. The estate was divided between three officers in Cromwell's army. One of them, Bradshaw, received the castle, but allowed the Purcells to continue living on the land. There were several inhabitants of the castle following Bradshaw's death, including the Dawson family and Moses Henshaw. A family of peasant farmers named Purcell were still living in the castle grounds in 1777 when the castle and lands were let to Thomas Wright.

William Ball Wright, who was a genealogist and one of the first SPG Anglican missionaries to Japan, was born at the castle in 1843. Lucy Olivia Wright, first Central Secretary of the Girls' Friendly Society, was born there in 1845. The Wright family occupied the castle until 1861.

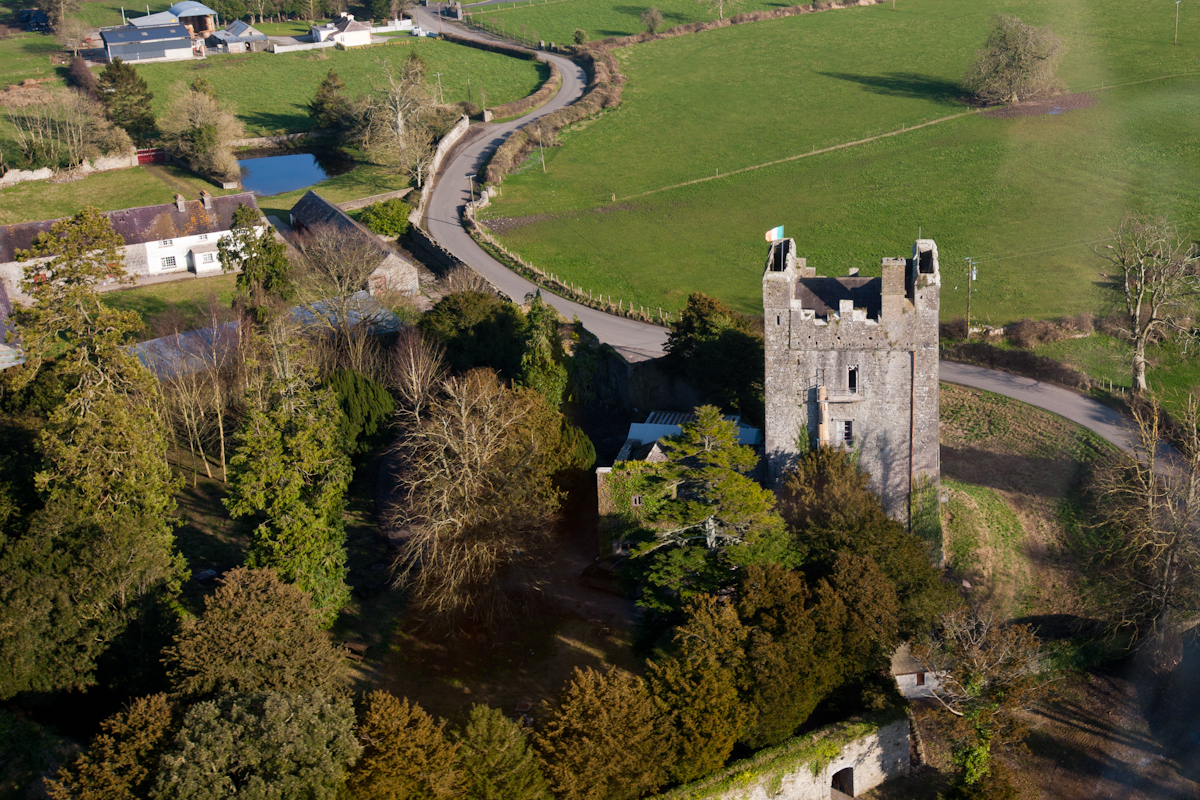
Foulksrath castle aerial view

The Swift family (relatives of Jonathan Swift) have been associated with the castle since at least 1857. In that year, Godwin Meade Pratt Swift patented the first aircraft in Ireland. He called the device an "aerial chariot" and tested it by launching it from the top of Foulkrath Castle via a catapult with his butler as the pilot. The plane immediately nosedived to the ground. The butler survived, but with multiple broken bones. In a 1948 article in the Old Kilkenny Review, John Gibb wrote that the Swift family purchased the castle in 1898. However, in a 1979 article in the same publication, John Brennan suggests they may have been the castle's owners, if not its residents, for a considerable time before that.

In 1910, the castle was let to a Colonel Butler and his sister. After the death of Miss Butler, the castle lay empty and began to fall into ruin. It was purchased from the Swift family by An Óige (the Irish Youth Hostel Association) in 1946 with community support. The purchase and cost of conversion into a youth hostel were met by a public appeal. The Castle was managed by Jack Macken (Ernest J Macken), an artist who exhibited his oil paintings (and the work of local artists) in the gallery. Jack Macken left the Castle and the hostel closed in 2009 and Foulksrath Castle is now privately owned.

== Architecture ==
Located about 12 km outside the medieval city of Kilkenny it is a well preserved and restored Norman Tower House. Most of the bawn (outer) wall and some ancillary structures also survive in addition to the main tower. A pitched roof has been added over the centre of the tower, though the open-air walk along the tower's crenellated battlement has been preserved and is still accessible. A narrow spiral staircase connects the four stories. The remains of a moat protect the outer walls of the tower. The moat is believed to have existed since the original structure was built some time in the early 13th century. It is probable that the earlier building was incorporated into the present structure.

== Hauntings ==
Several stories are in circulation as to the haunted nature of the castle and it was visited in 1992 by a BBC television crew of British ghost hunters.

The first legend concerns a female ghost said to look out from the castle windows; she is purported to be the daughter of a former owner of the castle, who, unhappy with his daughter's choice of lover, had her locked away in a tower, where she either starved to death, or was put to death by her father, depending on the version.

Another legend concerns another female ghost, this time a woman who wanders the castle accompanied by the scent of wild flowers, or lilacs.
