= Clogh, County Kilkenny =

Village in County Kilkenny, Ireland

Clogh An Chloch
- Village
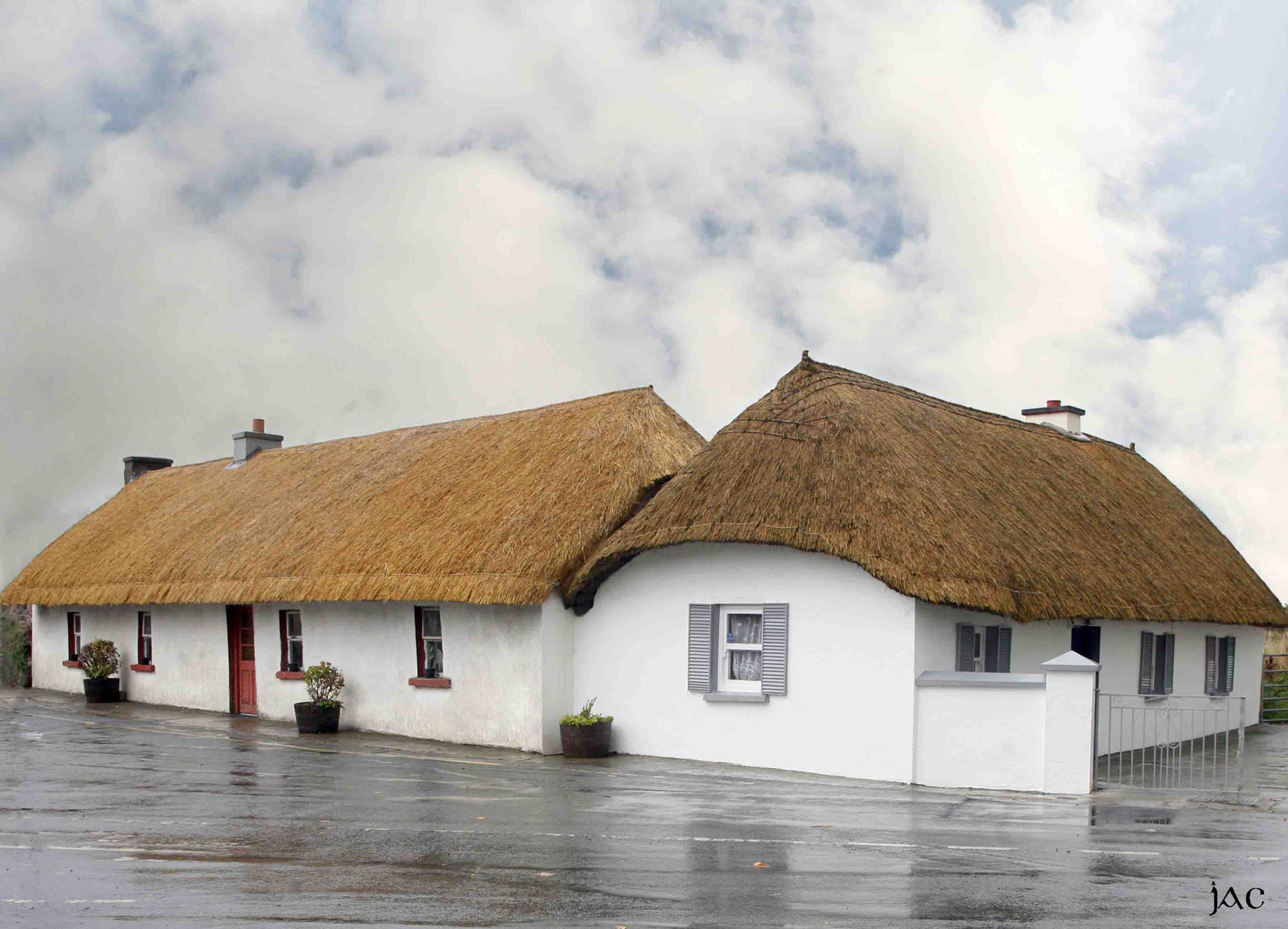
- Thatched building in Clogh

- Location in Ireland
- Coordinates: 52°51′37″N 7°09′46″W
- Country: Ireland
- Province: Leinster
- County: County Kilkenny

Population (2022)
  - Total: 298
- Time zone: UTC+0 (WET)
  - Summer (DST): UTC-1 (IST (WEST))
- Irish Grid Reference: S5627678602

Clogh (Irish: An Chloch) is a village, and namesake of an electoral district in County Kilkenny, Ireland. It is also a townland in the civil parish of Castlecomer in the ancient barony of Fassadinin.

== Location ==
Clogh is on the R426 road near Castlecomer. The village is 27 km north of Kilkenny city, 16 km from Carlow town, 25 km from Portlaoise, and 20 km from Athy to the north.

Clogh is in the Electoral Division of Clogh, in the civil parish of Castlecomer, in the Barony of Fassadinin, County of Kilkenny. Clogh borders the following townlands: Aughatubbrid or Chatsworth, Cloneen, Coolnaleen, Crutt, Kill, Loon, Moneenroe, Tourtane. The Electoral Division covers an area of 0.83 square miles with a population of 1,127.

== History ==
The village takes its name from the Irish An Chloc which means "stone" or "stone building". The original townland name was Magleitid ("broad plain").

William Carrigan, author of The History and Antiquities of Ossory (1897-1905), records a stone castle at Clough that was "ancient even in 1298" and of which, although no surface ruins remained, "its cellars still remain perfect beneath".

By the 19th century, at the time of the publication of Samuel Lewis's Topographical Dictionary of Ireland in 1837, Clogh lay along the road from Castlecomer on the road to Athy. It contained 116 houses (mostly thatched) and 582 inhabitants, many of whom were employed in the neighbouring collieries. It had a constabulary police station. In 1837, the district of Clogh comprised parts of the parishes of Castlecomer and Rathaspeck. The Roman Catholic chapel for the district was in Clogh.

== Built heritage ==
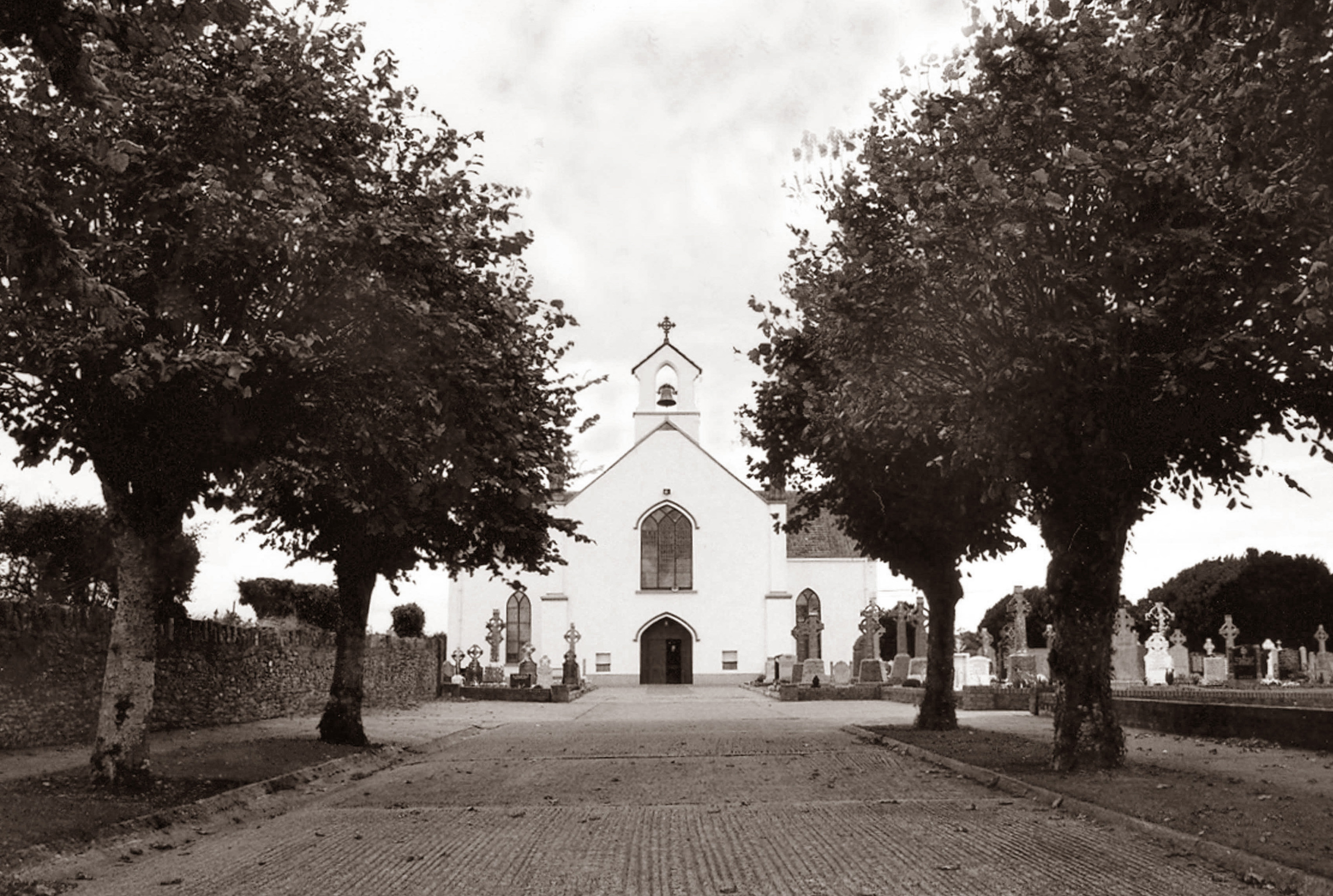
Parish Church in Clogh

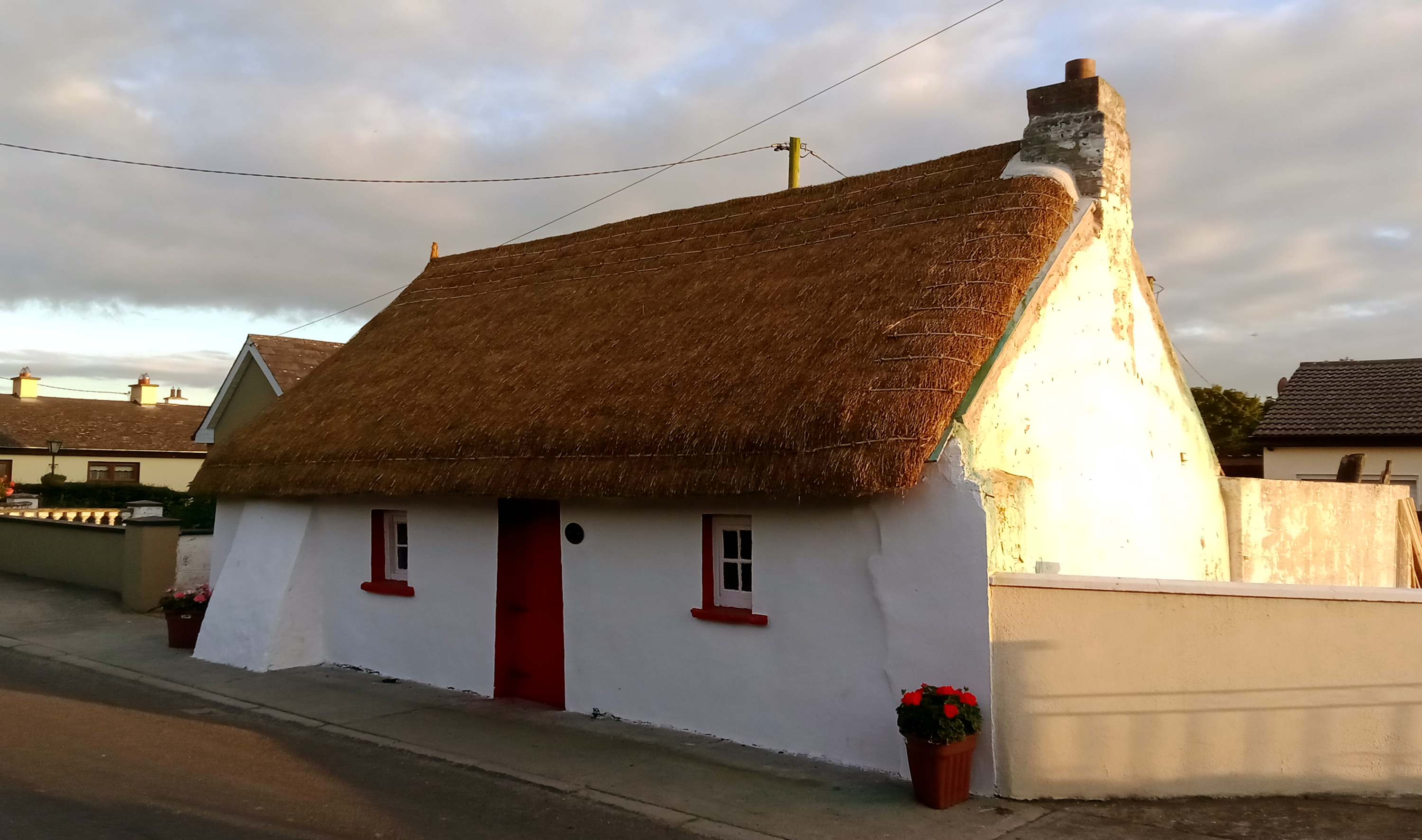
Thatched house in Clogh (NIAH 12400205)

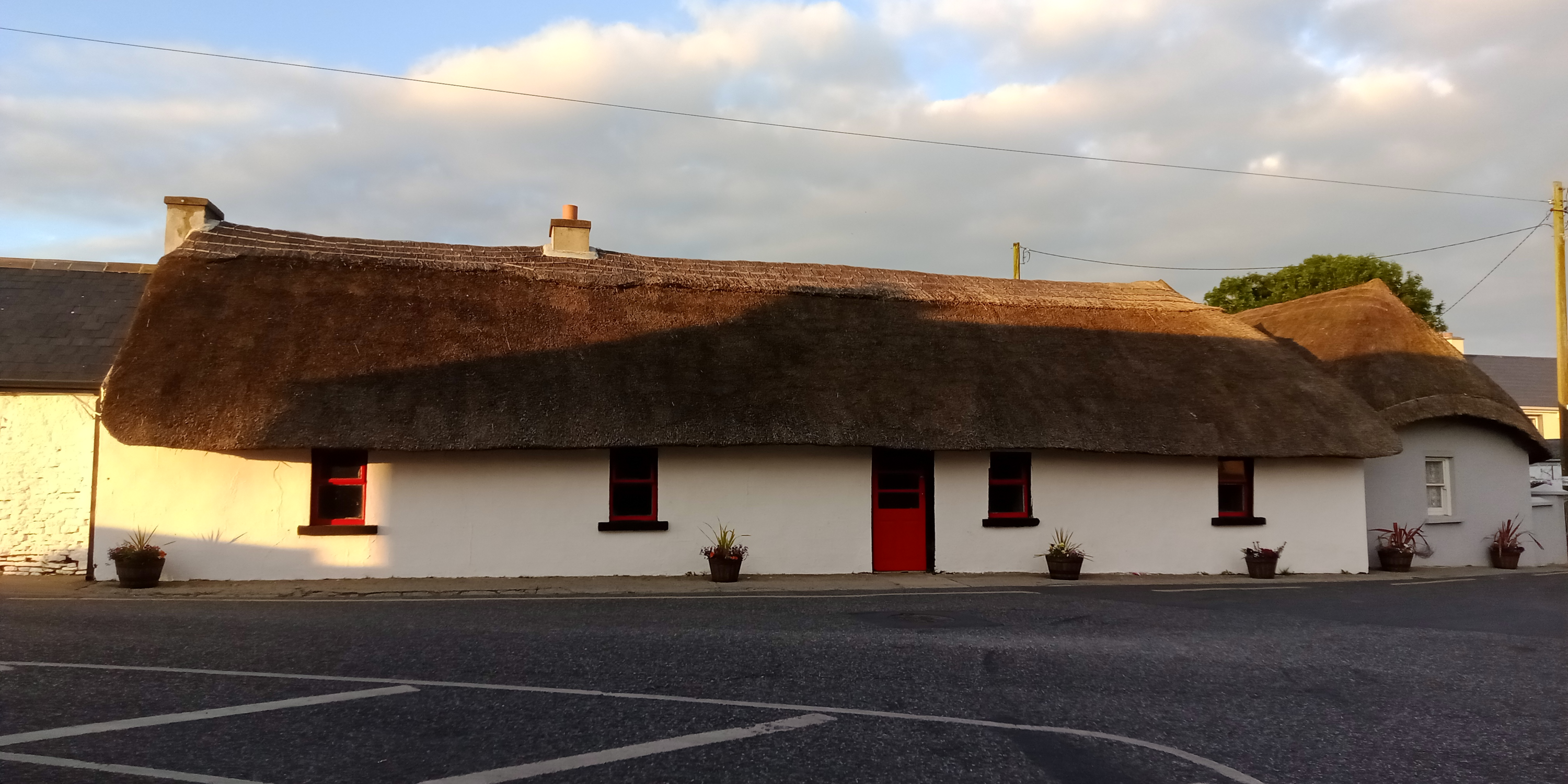
Thatched building (NIAH 12400205/12400206)

The first church in Clogh was built on the site of the present church in the 13th century. This replaced the ancient church that stood at Kilpatrick. The present church was built in 1826. The graveyard is large and contains monuments, including one to Michael Fenlon who constructed the first Boulton & Watt steam engine for use in the nearby Doonane Colliery (1793/94). Fenlon was a lecturer in Trinity College, Dublin, and died at the age of 36. Moneenroe Catholic Church was built in 1928 and cost twelve thousand pounds with the local miners contributing six thousand pounds. The Colliery Church was consecrated in 1829 and serves the Church of Ireland Community in the area.

There are three thatched buildings left in Clogh.

A water pillar at the village cross roads is still frequented regularly, and the source of the water is a well in the townland of Aughatubbrid or Chatsworth.

== Demographics ==
As of the Central Statistics Office's 2006 census, Clogh's population, including Chatsworth, was 351. This was a 9.7% change since 2002. As of the 2022 census, the village of Clogh had a population of 298.

Clogh was historically a more densely populated area, mostly due to the employment given in the local coal mines. Coalmining began in the 1640s by Christopher Wandesforde. The coal produced was a high grade anthracite with low sulphur content. Situated in the Leinster coal–fields which spread into counties Laois and Carlow, by the late 1800s seven or eight mines existed, and in Deerpark mines opened in the 1920s and at its peak employed 600 people. A number of coal-mining families from the area emigrated to Heckscherville, Pennsylvania during and after the Great Famine of 1845–1851. The Payne brothers, who ran the coal pits, came to the area of North Kilkenny and Laois to recruit miners for their mines. They provided transportation, employment and homes to those who agreed to move. The mines, in the Clogh area, closed in 1969.

== Amenities ==
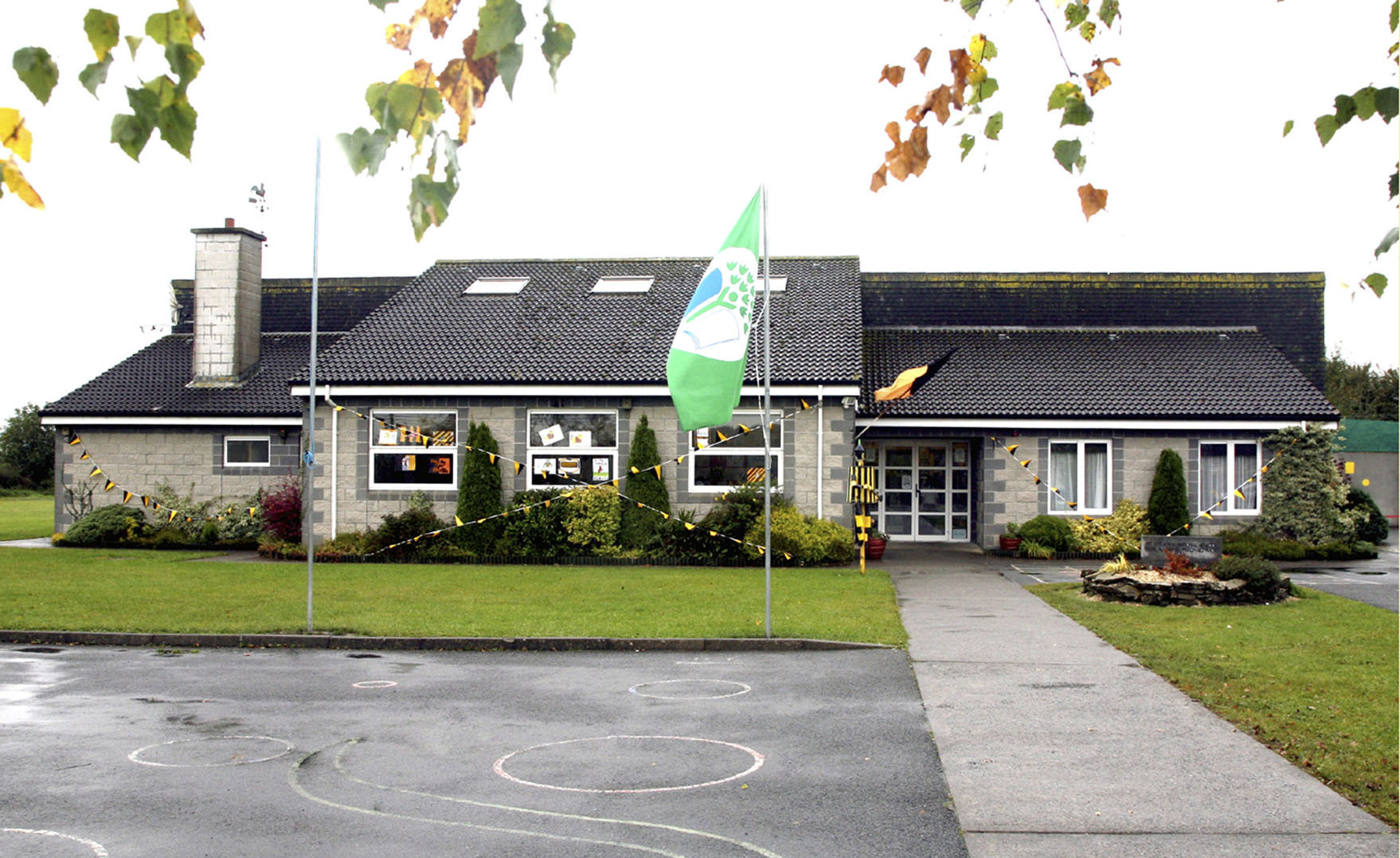
St. Patricks National School, Clogh

The local national (primary) school, St. Patrick's National School, was built in the 1990s to replace an earlier school building. That building, built in 1915, is now the parish centre. As of 2024, St. Patrick's National School had an enrollment of 66 pupils.

The last shop in Clogh closed in April 2024.

== Public transport ==
Clogh can be reached from Mountmellick/ Portlaoise or Kilkenny via Local Link bus 838 or from Mountmellick or Carlow using Local Link 822.

== See also ==
- List of towns and villages in Ireland
