= Deerpark Mines =

Set of coal mines in Ireland

- Location within Ireland
- Location: Castlecomer, County Kilkenny, Ireland; 52.823849°N 7.207728°W
- Products: anthracite
- Type: opencast coalmine
- Greatest depth: 700 feet (210 m)
- Opened: 1924
- Closed: 1969
- Company: Wandesforde family
- Website: discoverypark.ie

The Deerpark Mines (Irish: Páirc Na bhFia Mianach Guail), about 3 km north of Castlecomer, County Kilkenny, were the largest underground coalmines in Ireland, giving great employment to the area. The mines produced anthracite, a natural smokeless fuel, which unlike other forms of coal is not a major contributor to air pollution and air pollution-related deaths.

Other neighbouring coal mines were the Vera (named after Vera Wandesforde, the eldest daughter of the owner) and the Rock near Glenmullen.

Deerpark Colliery opened in 1924. It reached an average output of 400 tonnes of coal per day. By the 1960s the mines were uneconomical to run and finally closed in 1969.

== Coal Seams ==
=== The Old Three Foot Seam ===
This was first seam to be mined in the area. The coal was extracted through bell pits. The seam was exhausted using these methods by 1815.

=== The Jarrow Seam ===
This seam was named for the miners from Jarrow who were brought to work the pits. The coal was extracted from this seam through the use of explosives and steam pumps for haulage and pumping.

=== The Skehana Seam ===
This was the final seam to be discovered in the area. It contained high quality anthracite. Much of the mining was automated due to advancements in technology. In 1969, it was the last mine to close in the area.

== Miners ==
The Wandesforde family were the owners of the coal mines. The coalminers lived in the nearby town of Castlecomer, in the villages of Moneenroe and Clogh and all the nearby towns including Skehana, Mayhora, Firoda, Aughamucky, Glenmullen, Upperhills and Ardra. The Wandesforde family built a terrace of houses for the miners in Kilkenny Street, Castlecomer and a row of cottages at Deerpark as well as several individual cottages throughout the area.

== Railway ==
The mines were connected to the railway system in Ireland in 1919. The connection was closed in 1962. At peak production in the 1950s, trains carried 300 tons a day to a depot at Kilkenny railway station. Each train carried about 100 tons, which would be loaded on from 10 to 15 carriages.

== Heritage ==
A museum about the mines was opened in 2007 in Castlecomer town.

The maternal grandfather of former US ambassador to the UN Samantha Power, operated as a trades union organiser in the area.

== Saying ==
Anthracite from Castlecomer was the source of the saying about qualities of County Kilkenny: "Fire without smoke."
