= Jenkinstown Park =

Park in County Kilkenny, Ireland

Coordinates: 52°43′57″N 7°17′32″W

Jenkinstown Castle, c. 1830

Jenkinstown Park is a park in County Kilkenny, Ireland. It is situated off the N78 road about ten km north of the city of Kilkenny and 11 km south of Castlecomer. The Dunmore Caves are nearby.

== History ==
The park was formerly part of the old Bryan-Bellew Estate. A small garden to commemorate Thomas Moore's association with the house has been laid down on the site of the old house.

== Facilities ==
Facilities include a picnic site, forest walks, small commemorative garden, deer park and a craft centre. There are walks of between one and three kilometres through a plantation of mixed broadleaf and conifers. The park is managed by Coillte.

== Flora and fauna ==
Tree species within the park include beech, ash, oak, and Norway spruce. Some original park trees from the 1870s survive and include a number of rare species such as the Chinese necklace poplar, Populus lasiocarpa. Bluebells typically flower, in the beech and birch woods in the park, from mid April to late May.

The park is home to foxes, badgers, stoats, red and grey squirrels, and enclosed deer, as well as bats in the old church. A number of species of birds – including pheasant, ravens, and the long-eared owl – inhabit the woods.
