= Slane (disambiguation) =

Slane may refer to:

Places

- Slane, a village in County Meath, Ireland
- Slane Castle, located in Slane village
- Hill of Slane, important historical site located in Slane village
- Slane, County Antrim, a townland in County Antrim, Northern Ireland
- Slanes, County Down, a parish and townland in County Down, Northern Ireland

People

- Chris Slane, a New Zealand cartoonist
- Dan Slane, an American businessman
- Paul Slane, Scottish footballer
- Baron Slane, a Barony in the Peerage of Ireland

Music

- Slane Concert, a concert held in most years in Slane
- Slane, an Irish folk tune to which a number of songs and hymns are sung, including "Be Thou My Vision"
