= River Dinan =

River in Ireland

Coordinates: 52.823238°N 7.086903°W

River Dinan River Dinin, River Deen
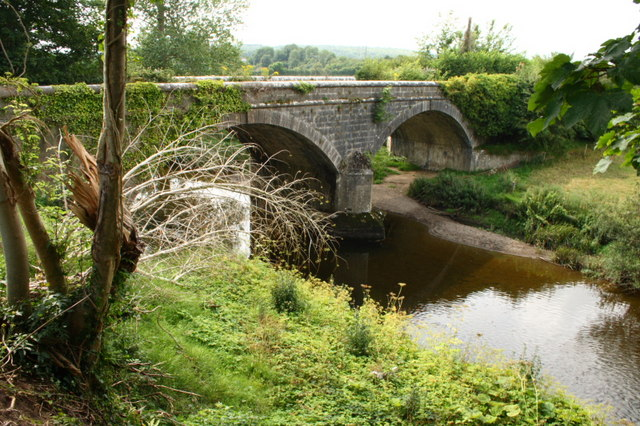
- New Dinin Bridge
- Etymology: Irish dianan, "fast/rapid river, flood"
- Native name: An Deighean (Irish)

Physical characteristics
- Source
  - location: southeast County Laois
- Mouth
  - location: Celtic Sea via River Nore
- Length: 39.83 km (24.75 mi)
- Basin size: 153 km^{2} (59 sq mi)
- Discharge
  - average: 0.210 m^{3}/s (7.4 cu ft/s)

The River Dinan, Deen or Dinin is a river in Ireland, flowing through County Kilkenny and County Laois.

== Course ==
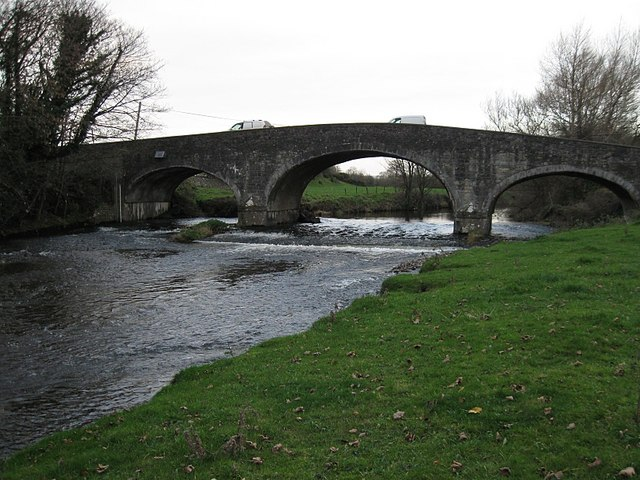
Dinin Bridge, on the N77 north of Kilkenny City.

The Dinan rises in the southeast corner of County Laois, flowing westwards under the N78 at Ormond Bridge. It meets the Clogh River near the border with County Kilkenny and continues southwest under Massford Bridge. It flows through Castlecomer and continues southwest through the Kilkenny countryside, passing Jenkinstown Park and flowing under the N77 and meeting the River Nore at Dunmore West, upstream of Kilkenny City. It gives its name to the Barony of Fassadinin ("Wilderness along the Dinin").

== Wildlife ==
Fish species include three-spined stickleback, Atlantic salmon, stone loach, brook lamprey and European river lamprey. It is also home to many white trout, as recorded by Tim Pat Coogan in his memoir.

According to local folklore, Saint Patrick cursed the reeds on the bank of the Dinan so that their tops were withered.

== See also ==
- Rivers of Ireland
