= Slana =

Slana may refer to:

- Slana, Alaska, a populated place in the Copper River Census Area
- Slana River, in Alaska, a tributary of Copper River
- Slana, Croatia, a village near Petrinja
- Slana concentration camp, existed during World War II on the island of Pag in Croatia
- Slaná river, in Slovakia and Hungary, a tributary to Tisza
- Slaná (Semily District), a municipality and village in the Czech Republic
