= Slaney =

Slaney is a surname.

Notable people with this surname include:

- Geoffrey Slaney (1922–2016), British surgeon and academic
- Ivor Slaney (1921–1998), England musical composer and conductor
- John Slaney (born 1972), Canadian ice hockey player
- Malcolm Slaney, American electrical engineer
- Richard Slaney (born 1956), British discus thrower
- Robert Aglionby Slaney (1791–1862), British barrister and politician
- Robert Slaney (ice hockey) (born 1988), Canadian ice hockey player
- Stephen Slaney (died 1608), English politician
- Thomas Slaney (1852–1935), English footballer and manager
- Mary Decker (married name Mary Slaney; born 1958), American middle-distance runner
- Philip Kenyon-Slaney (1896–1928), British politician
- William Kenyon-Slaney (1847–1908), English sportsman, soldier and politician
