= Castlecomer =

Town in County Kilkenny, Ireland

Castlecomer Caisleán an Chomair
- Town
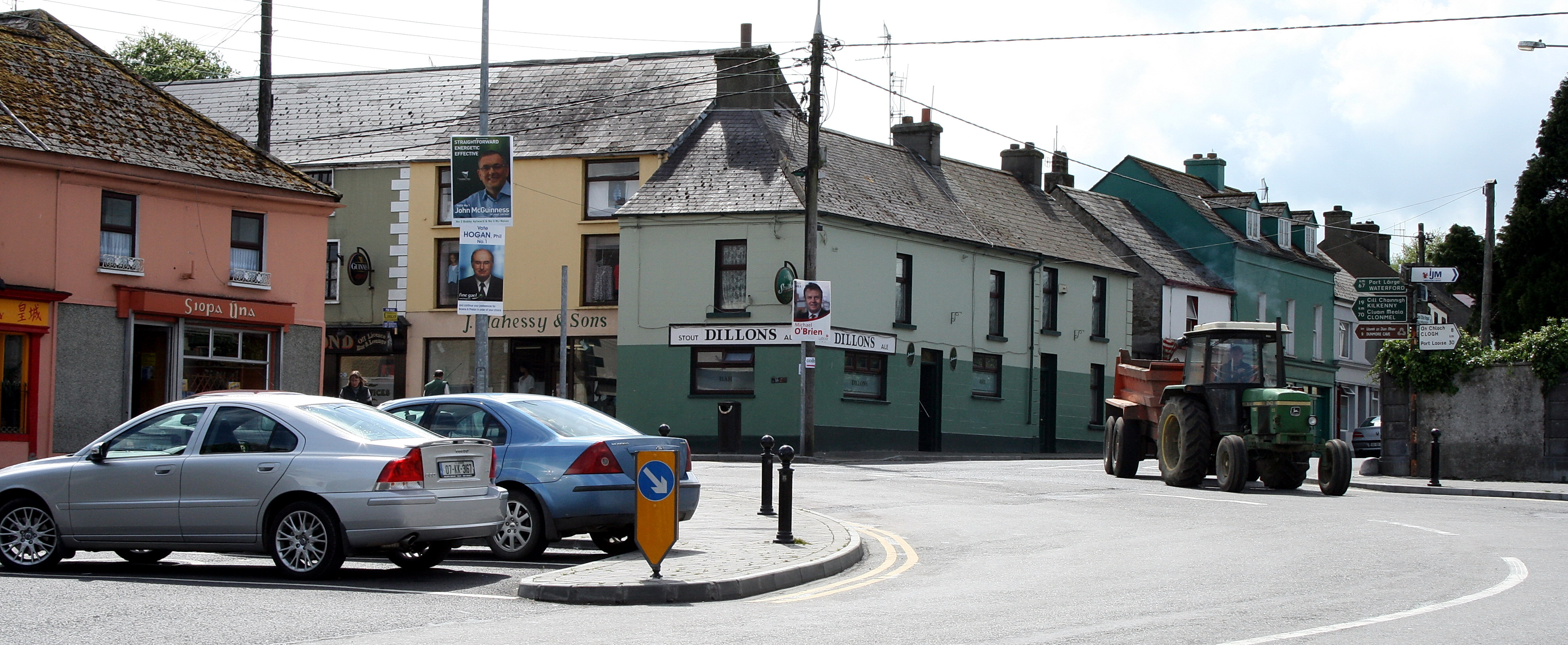
- Businesses on the square in Castlecomer

- Location in Ireland
- Coordinates: 52°48′22″N 7°12′36″W
- Country: Ireland
- Province: Leinster
- County: County Kilkenny

Area
  - Total: 30.5 km^{2} (11.8 sq mi)

Population (2016)
  - Total: 1,502
  - Density: 49.2/km^{2} (128/sq mi)
- Time zone: UTC+0 (WET)
  - Summer (DST): UTC-1 (IST (WEST))
- Irish Grid Reference: S532731

Historical population
Year	Pop.	±%
1821	905	—
1831	2,436	+169.2%
1841	1,765	−27.5%
1851	1,694	−4.0%
1861	1,435	−15.3%
1871	1,321	−7.9%
1881	1,182	−10.5%
1891	1,019	−13.8%
1901	958	−6.0%
1911	872	−9.0%
1926	829	−4.9%
1936	809	−2.4%
1946	718	−11.2%
1951	722	+0.6%
1956	1,191	+65.0%
1961	1,129	−5.2%
1966	1,141	+1.1%
1971	1,244	+9.0%
1981	1,548	+24.4%
1986	1,490	−3.7%
1991	1,396	−6.3%
1996	1,380	−1.1%
2002	1,482	+7.4%
2006	1,531	+3.3%
2011	1,456	−4.9%
2016	1,502	+3.2%

Castlecomer (Irish: Caisleán an Chomair, 'castle at the confluence') is a town in the north of County Kilkenny, Ireland. It is positioned at the meeting of N78 and R694 roads about 16 km (9.9 mi) north of Kilkenny city. At the 2016 census, Castlecomer had a population of 1,502 people. The town is in a townland and civil parish of the same name.

The town has been associated with the coal mining industry since the 17th century, and is part of a discrete area called the Castlecomer Plateau. It is bounded on the east by the River Barrow, the west by the River Nore and dissected in the centre by the River Dinnin.

== History ==
The earliest record of a settlement at Castlecomer is from around 1200, when the Norman knight William Marshal, 1st Earl of Pembroke built a motte and bailey castle east of the existing bridge. The ruins of the castle stand where the rivers Dinin (Dinan), Brokagh and Cloghogue meet. Until the 16th century, Castlecomer was the home of the Ó Braonáins.

Iron mining began in the area during the late Middle Ages; from the 17th century onwards, this was complemented (and later surpassed) by coal mines. From 1637, the town was built, initially by, and as accommodation for, 600 settlers from Yorkshire, England. These settlers had been recruited by Christopher Wandesforde, who originated from Kirklington and had acquired Castlecomer Demesne with the cooperation of the Lord Deputy of Ireland, Thomas Wentworth (later Earl of Strafford). The Yorkshire settlers were recruited for their skills in ironwork, weaving, pottery, and forestry. Wandesforde laid out the town and established a forestry plantation on Castlecomer Demesne, before his death in 1640. According to local tradition, Wandesforde modelled the layout and architecture on an area in Italy named "Alsinore" (possibly the island of Asinara, sometimes known as Asinare or Alsinara, off Sardinia). In addition to accommodating the new industries and their employees, Castlecomer was to become the principal market town for North Kilkenny.

Much of Castlecomer and the surrounding area was owned by members of the Wandesforde family until the 21st century. Castlecomer House, the family home of the Wandesfordes, stood on the opposite side of the Athy-Kilkenny road (now the N78). The building was said to have been on a grander scale than the original Wandesforde residence in Yorkshire, and to have been a testament to the fortunes of the Wandesfordes in Ireland. The original house, which was reportedly built in 1638, was burned down during the Irish Rebellion of 1798. The second Castlecomer House was built on the same site in 1802 at the behest of Lady Anne Ormonde. The house itself was described as being more imposing than its predecessor. It was reputedly notable for its castellated, Gothic revival style, including 365 windows (i.e. one for each day of the year), large porchway and the Wandesforde coat of arms displayed prominently on the outside. The approach to the residence included a sweeping avenue, and a bridge over a moat (formed by diverting river waters). By the mid-1970s, the house was no longer occupied and had fallen into disrepair; most of the building was demolished in 1975. However, the property's main entrance and avenue, as a well as a lodge building survived.

== Access and facilities ==
To the east of the town is Castlecomer Golf Club and Sawney's Woods. The courthouse is located in Market Square. The town square has Georgian houses surrounded by the Lime trees. Approximately 100 buildings of architectural or historical relevance within Castlecomer are listed for preservation.

=== Road links ===
Castlecomer is on the National Primary Route that links Kilkenny and Athy as well as the M9 motorway. Castlecomer Bridge, locally known as 'the Dublin bridge' or 'the Big bridge', dates from 1763 and spans the River Dinin (Deen). It was built to designs prepared by George Smith and is a five-arch rubble limestone Classical-style road bridge (Reg. No. 12301001). It is one of a number of bridges rebuilt by Smith following the "Great Flood" of 1763 (others include Green's Bridge, Graiguenamanagh Bridge and Inistioge Bridge). Robust details exhibiting high-quality stone masonry enhance the Classical quality of the composition. Marking a crossing over the Dinin (Deen) River the bridge forms an appealing landmark on the road leading into the town from the east.

The JJ Kavanagh and Sons route 717 links Clonmel to Dublin Airport through Kilkenny and serves Castlecomer twice a day in each direction. Buggy Coaches operates a frequent bus service to Kilkenny city and also a once a day (two on Saturdays; none Sundays) service to Carlow.

=== Rail links ===
The closest railway stations are Kilkenny (MacDonagh), Carlow railway station, Athy railway station and Portlaoise railway station.

=== Castlecomer Railway ===
In the past Castlecomer had a busy railway line. Castlecomer railway station opened on 21 February 1921 with a passenger service between Castlecomer and Kilkenny. Funding for the Castlecomer line came from Captain Richard Henry (R.H.) Prior-Wandesforde and a War Office Grant, which was given to ease postwar unemployment. It closed for passenger traffic on 26 January 1931 and closed completely on 1 January 1963. This was largely due to the decline of coal mining in the area. Castlecomer station was the passenger terminus of the last ever proper branch line to be built in Ireland, when the Great Southern & Western Railway opened a line just north of Kilkenny on the Portlaoise via Abbeyleix line to the coal mining town of Castlecomer and Deerpark Mines in 1922. The branch lost its passenger service only ten years after opening, however it remained open for coal and general goods until January 1963, closing along with the Portlaoise to Kilkenny line. The corrugated iron station building and single platform at Castlecomer Station are now long gone, the site now occupied by the 'Railway Garage'. The trackbed of the coal mine extension from the station to the coal mines outside Castlecomer town is now a footpath. Many of the concrete piers which carried the railway across the Dinin River are still in situ just south of Dysart crossing, visible from the adjacent N78 road. You can also still see the left-side concrete bridge abutment at Cloghogue Bridge, Chatsworth Street. This bridge spanned either side of the two roads here (R694/R426) with a centre pillar support.

=== Emergency services ===
The Garda Síochána have a station on the Kilkenny Road. When the station is unmanned, calls are diverted to Kilkenny Garda Station.

Castlecomer Fire Station is located on the Kilkenny Road. Castlecomer's fire service began in the 1940s when Kilkenny County Council supplied a fire service in the late 1940s with the trailer pump based in Market Square. The Original Mining Company trailer pump was given to Castlecomer Fire Service and was based in the mining office yard. Later in 1954, a newer fire station was built in Love Lane. In late 2009, construction began on a new fire station on the Kilkenny Road and this opened officially in May 2010. It houses a Class B Fire Water Tender/Ladder appliance and serves Castlecomer and much of north-east Kilkenny.

=== Library ===
Opened in 1999, Castlecomer Library is located on Kilkenny Street, opposite the Church of the Immaculate Conception. In addition to other library services, it runs adult literacy and word-aid literacy courses throughout the year. Opening days are Tuesday to Saturday.

== Education ==
Castlecomer has three primary level schools. The Presentation Convent Primary School was built in 1965. Until 2011, the school had a Presentation sister as principal. It has 6 full-time teachers and additional support staff. The school holds four Green Flags (Litter and Waste, Energy, Water, Travel) and are working towards a fifth for Biodiversity. The boys' national school (built in 1939) is a four-teacher school and caters for boys from second to sixth class. Wandesforde National School is a three-teacher school, under Church of Ireland management. It holds a Green Flag for Litter and Waste and is working towards a second for Energy.

Castlecomer has one second-level school, Castlecomer Community School. This came into existence in May 1987 following an amalgamation of the Presentation Secondary School and the Vocational School. It offers Junior Certificate, Leaving Certificate, Leaving Certificate Applied, Leaving Certificate Vocational Programme and Transition Year. It holds a Green Flag for litter and waste. Castlecomer Community School also offers courses within its College of Further Education scheme. Courses include FETAC Level 5 in Childcare, with special needs and FETAC Level 5 in Business with Computers.

== Sport and recreation ==
Erin's Own GAA is the local Gaelic Athletic Association club. It was founded in 1885. The club colours are blue and white. Erin's Own fielded teams in 11 different grades of hurling from Under 6 up to senior and in 7 grades of football in 2012. With a membership of over 300 adults and almost 150 youths the club has two properties. The first, the Prince Grounds, is in the town and the second, Canon Kearns Park, is on the outskirts of the town, towards Kilkenny.

Deen Celtic A.F.C. is the local soccer club in Castlecomer and was formed in 1984. The club colours are red and black. Soccer in Castlecomer goes back to the early 1950s when the first team was formed, the club names have changed over the years but Deen Celtic is the longest established club in the town. A floodlit all-weather pitch was installed in 1999.

Deenside Wheelers is the local cycling club. It is an affiliated member of Cycling Ireland.

Castlecomer also has an 18-hole golf course. It is a par 72, 6,180m links course.

There is also an athletics club and basketball club. Castlecomer Community Hall hosts a range of sport, recreation, drama and other events throughout the year. The Deenside Players pantomime society organise an annual pantomime in early February.

== Religion ==
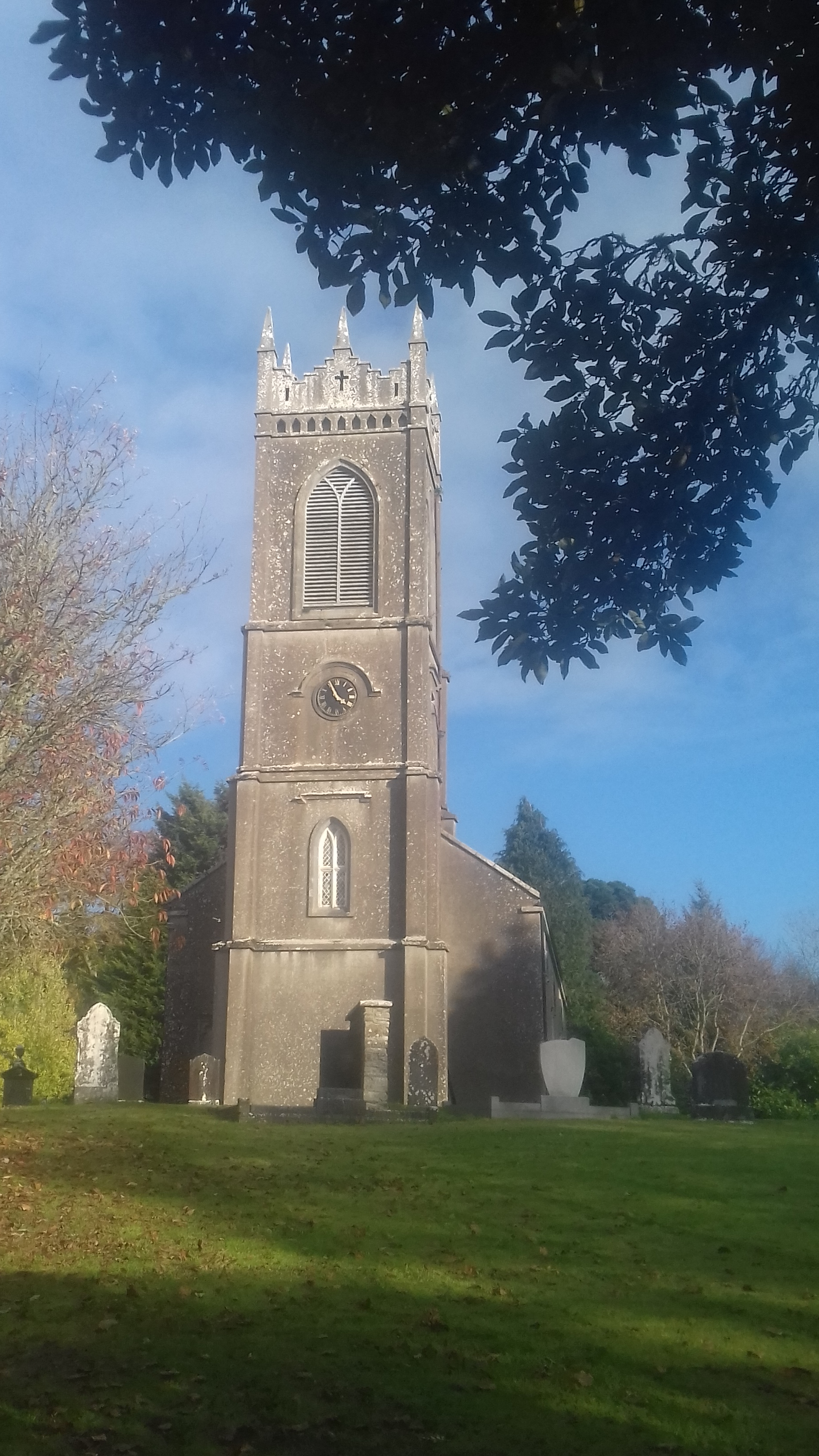
St Mary's Castlecomer

The Church of the Immaculate Conception is the Roman Catholic church on Kilkenny Street. For more than two centuries this site has been a place of worship. A simple thatched chapel stood here in the 1750s and was replaced some forty years later by the Church of the Holy Cross which served the people until the present church was built in 1852. The foundation stone for the present Gothic style church was laid on 16 August 1844 by Father Joseph Butler P.P. and was completed in 1852 during the ministry of his successor Father Edward Aylward P.P. The church, designed by William Deane Butler, Dublin, was dedicated to the honour of Our Lady under the name 'Church of the Immaculate Conception'. Features of the church include: the matching altar, ambo and chair, the painted ceiling, the stained glass windows, the stations of the cross and an ornate sanctuary lamp.

St Mary's Church is the Church of Ireland church on the Dublin Road. It stands on the site of the ancient parish Church of the Holy Cross in Castlecomer. In 1374, Alexander, Bishop of Ossory, confirmed the Church of Castlecomer to the Prior and Canons of Saint John's Abbey, Kilkenny. In the early 15th century, the Revd Walter Comys was excommunicated by the Bishop of Ossory in 1428 when he held on to the church and refused to hand it over to William Stakboll, Prior of Saint John's Abbey. In 1540, St John's Abbey was suppressed at the English Reformation; its possessions, including the Rectory of Castlecomer, were granted to the Corporation of Kilkenny. There are monuments to Wandesford, Butler and Price families throughout the church. Previous rectors of the parish include Dr Robert MacCarthy, a former Dean of St Patrick's Cathedral in Dublin, and the Venerable Andrew Orr, current archdeacon of the Ossory end of the United Dioceses of Cashel, Ferns, and Ossory. The present rector is the Rev Edna Wakely.

== Economy ==
=== Agriculture ===
There are approximately 60 farms in the area, ranging in size from between 10 and 100 hectares with a total of 2003 hectares being farmed. There are 4451 cattle and 768 sheep, and farming is done with grassland machines, tillage machines, tractors, winter feeding and milking equipment. Specialist farms include beef production, dairy and mixed grazing livestock.

=== Coal-mining heritage ===
Mineral resources include deposits of anthracite coal, shale and fireclay and have been exploited for several hundred years. Until 1969, coal mining was the key economic activity in Castlecomer and the surrounding areas. Mining began in the mid 17th Century with the extraction of iron ore. Huge areas of oak woodland were cleared to feed the smelting furnaces. Coal deposits were found beneath the shale and these were to form the basis of the coal mining industry in the area which lasted for over 300 years. In the mid 17th century, Christopher Wandesforde, from Yorkshire was invited to Ireland by the Lord Lieutenant and granted a large estate in Castlecomer which included the Castlecomer coalfield. The Wandesforde family was responsible for the opening up of a number of coal seams (The Old Three Foot Seam, The Jarrow Seam and The Skehana Seam). The Leinster Coalfield is centred on Castlecomer and extends into counties Laois and Carlow. The coal seams were often quite narrow but the coal itself was very high-quality anthracite with a low sulphur content. Castlecomer coal was sold within a twenty-mile radius of the collieries and the coal was transported by horse and cart. Over time, several important plant and animal fossils have been discovered amongst the shale quarries of Castlecomer. Miners faced harsh working conditions and struggled against the mine owner. Some miners formed secret societies, trade unions, republican and indeed even communist organisations.

=== Manufacturing ===
Later brick production using shale deposits from the local landscape was a key activity and employer with the Roadstone company Ormonde Brick Ltd. who were a leading producer of fired-clay facing bricks in Ireland. The textile industry was also vibrant in the town. Towards the end of the Celtic Tiger era, the textile industry moved abroad and also the brick making factory ceased production. Present day manufacturing companies in the town include Intosport Ireland and Steel and Roofing Systems.

=== Tourism ===
Following the decline of coal-mining and also the large manufacturing plants, Castlecomer has seen its economic activity transition further into the services sector. Today, tourism and related services have now become a viable option for the town. Castlecomer's wooded setting and fine architecture are its principal attractions with Castlecomer Discovery Park and the annual Wellie Race offering a variety of nature, arts, culture and heritage attractions for visitors to the town. Dunmore Cave, a limestone cave known for its archæological discoveries and for being the site of a Viking massacre in 928, is nearby and Kilkenny city is also less than 20 km away.

==== Castlecomer Discovery Park ====
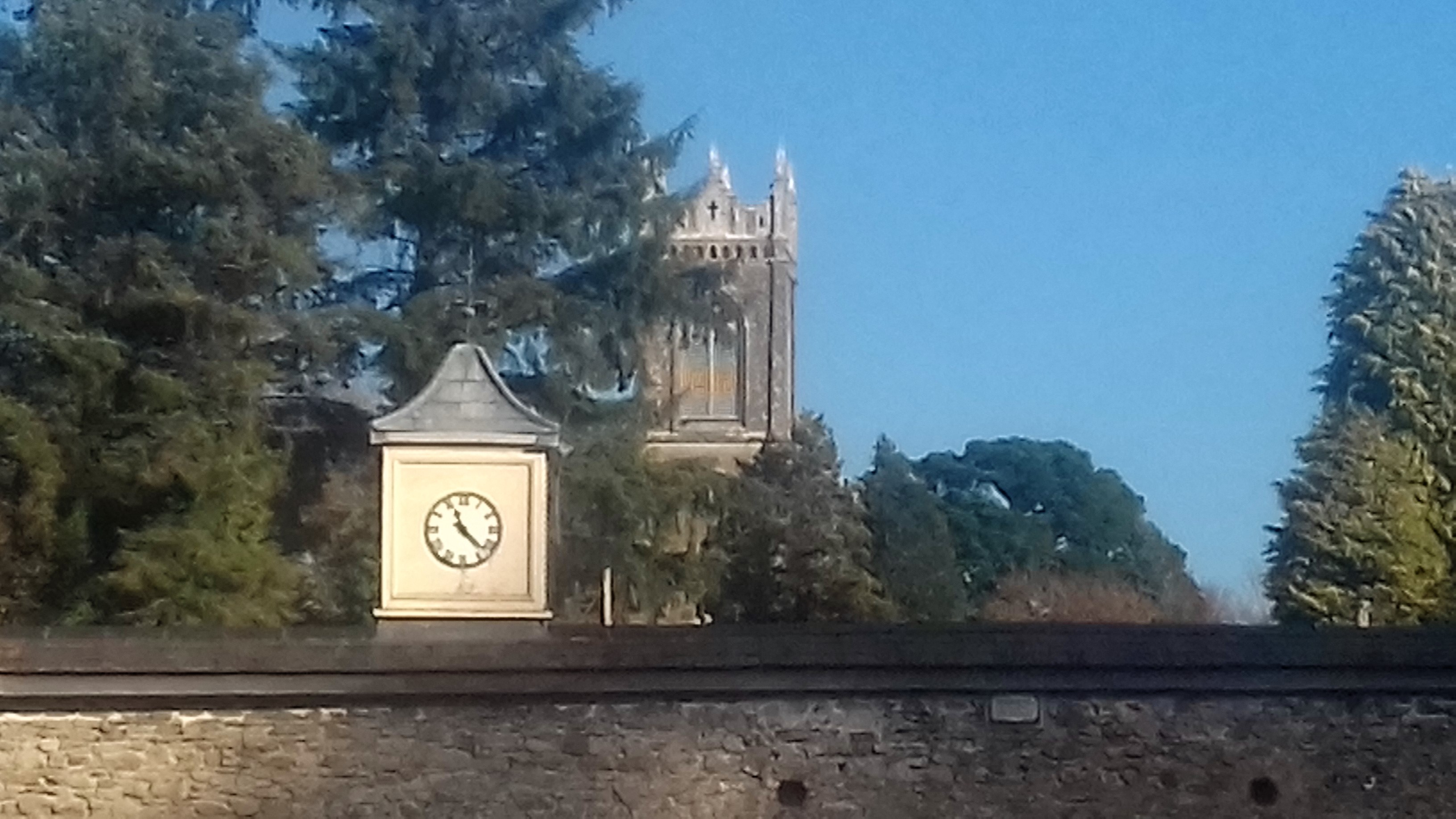
Wandesford Estate: yard wall, clock tower and spire of St Mary's

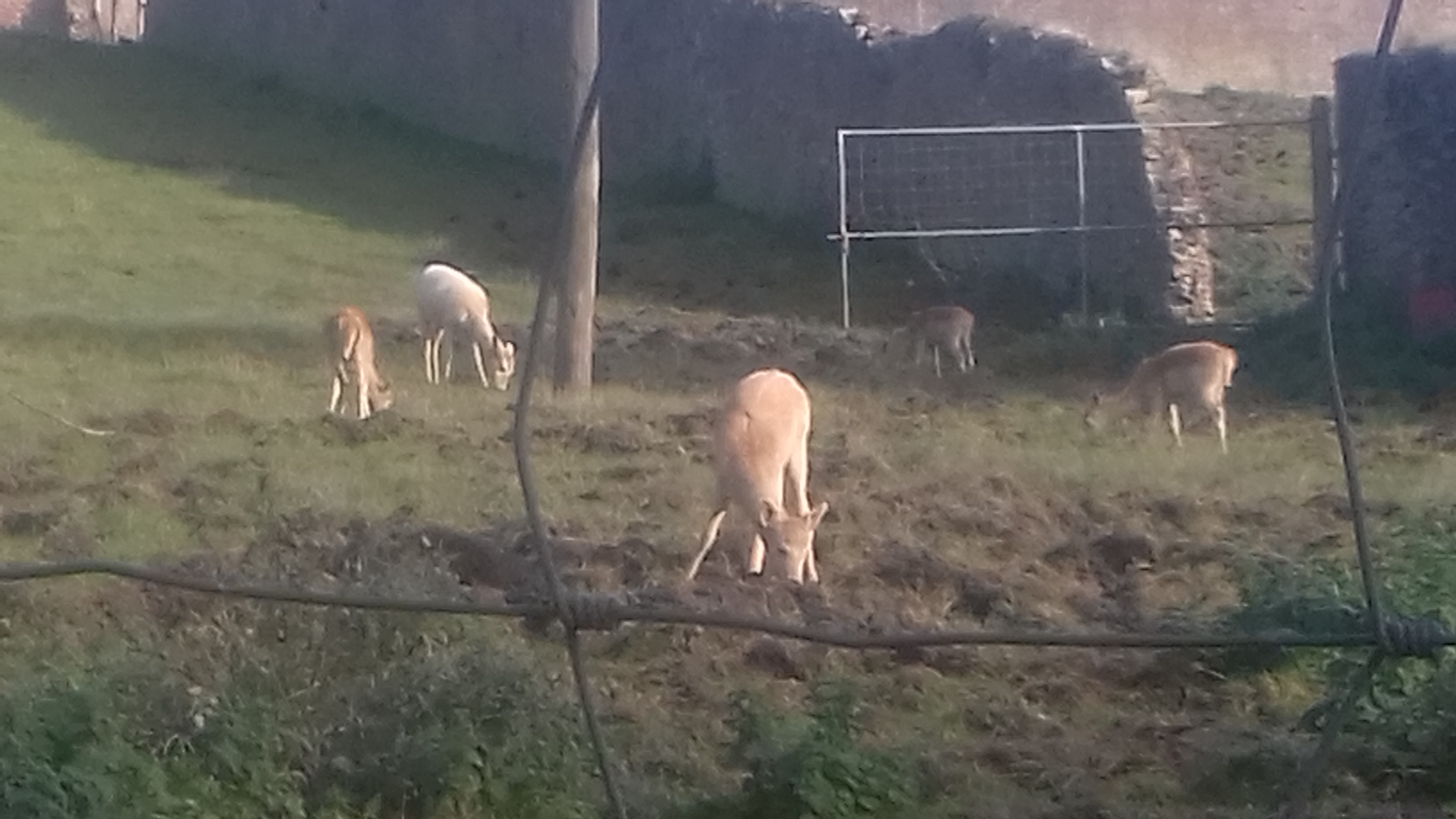
Fallow deer in the former walled garden of the Wandesford Estate in October 2018

In June 2007, Castlecomer Discovery Park opened to the public. It is a non-profit community enterprise located in the grounds of the 18th century Wandesforde Estate. The enterprise was conceived to rejuvenate the town following the closure of the coal mines in 1969. Comprising 80 acres of woodland and lakes, the park initially included the 'Footprints in Coal' exhibition, a visitor centre and design craft studios. The stables and other buildings were restored and now house craft units and education facilities. The original walled garden is home to a small herd of fallow and sika deer and to a flock of Jacob sheep. In 2012 the "Tree Top Adventure Walk", "Leap of Faith" experience and a climbing wall were added. The Discovery Park operates a "Leave No Trace" policy.

==== Wellie Race ====
On New Year's Day, the annual Castlecomer Wellie Race takes place. Originally started in 1978, the Powley (an area in the hills surrounding Castlecomer) men decided, while playing cards, on St Stephen's Day to run off the Christmas excess by having a race over a cross country circuit, uniquely wearing a pair of wellingtons. Later, in 1981, the first Castlecomer Wellie Race took place over a 5 km cross-country circuit around Kiltown on New Years Day. All race participants must wear appropriate foot attire—wellies. From here the event grew, and the following year 1982 saw the first float parade. The event continues in that tradition with a 'Race Personality' opening proceedings of the float parade followed by the wellie race itself. Race Personalities over the years have included local former Olympic boxer Mick Dowling, Mícheál Ó Muircheartaigh, Ronan Collins, Jimmy Magee, Michael Carruth, Tommy Walsh and racehorse trainer Jim Bolger. The annual event is used to raise funds for local, national and international charities.

== Geology and fossils ==
=== Geology ===
The Leinster Coalfield (the Castlecomer Plateau) is hosted by an outlier (younger rocks surrounded by stratigraphically underlying older rocks) of Upper Carboniferous sandstones, siltstones and shales that sit on the surrounding Lower Carboniferous limestones. These rock types formed over 300 Million years ago and form the bedrock of Castlecomer and surrounding areas. The area's geological history has facilitated coal-mining and brick production industries. "Footprints in Coal" is a permanent interactive multimedia exhibition in the town which tells the story of the Castlecomer Coal deposits from the formation of the coal in the enormous swamp forests of the Carboniferous Period to the mines which operated until 1969. The exhibition uses fossils, mining artefacts, models, audio-visual and life-sized reconstructions of Carboniferous plants and animals to illustrate the story.

=== Fossils ===
Coal-mining at Castlecomer has unearthed a number of fossils over the years of exploration. Many of the animal fossils found in the Castlecomer coal were amphibians. The National Museum of Ireland and Trinity College Dublin have some very rare amphibians from the Jarrow Colliery, and replicas can be viewed at the Castlecomer Discovery Park Exhibition.

William Booking Brownrigg was a scholar who had heard about the plant fossils in Castlecomer and came to examine them. He found something much more significant than expected—the remains of ancient amphibians. He started to write about them and persuaded the Geological Survey of Ireland to pay for their illustration. Edward Percival Wright was a professor of geology at Trinity College Dublin. He heard about the amphibian finds in Clogh and came to study them himself. After studying the amphibians, he realised their importance and arranged for further excavation of the mine, which yielded more fossils. Wright then contacted Thomas Henry Huxley to come and examine the fossils and together they published a paper on them in 1867. Huxley described at least ten genres of amphibian fossils in Castlecomer, five of which were previously unknown. These were an exceptional assemblage of Upper Carboniferous fossil amphibians discovered in coal measures at Jarrow Colliery, Castlecomer. Texts from Wright and Huxley include:

- (1866) On a collection of fossils from the Jarrow Colliery, Kilkenny Geological Magazine, v. 3, pp. 165–171.
- (1867) On a Collection of Fossil Vertebrata from the Jarrow Colliery County Kilkenny Ireland. Transactions of the Royal Irish Academy Vol. 24 – Science.

== Politics ==
Castlecomer is part of Dáil constituency of the Carlow–Kilkenny which returns 5 TDs. The local government is Kilkenny County Council. Castlecomer and its rural area forms a local electoral area of County Kilkenny which includes Attanagh, Ballyragget, Castlecomer, Clogh, Clogharinka, Moneenroe, Mothell and Muckalee.

== Twinning ==
Castlecomer is twinned with Penvénan in the Côtes-d'Armor department of Brittany in northwestern France. In September 1999 a delegation including the Mayor Fernand le Duc visited Castlecomer and it was agreed to formally twin Castlecomer with Penvénan. In April 2000 the Twinning Charter was signed in Penvénan and in Castlecomer in April 2001. Schools students and community groups from both towns have visited each other over the years for tourism, sport, art, culture and education trips.

== Notable people ==
- John Byrne, Victoria Cross recipient
- Ellen Cahill (1863–1934), Irish-Australia street singer also known as "Killarney Kate", born Castlecomer
- William Henry Walker, New York politician and father of Mayor James J. Walker

== See also ==
- List of towns and villages in Ireland
- Market Houses in Ireland
- Christopher Wandesford
- Viscount Castlecomer
