= N78 road (Ireland) =

Road in Ireland

N78 road
- Bóthar N78
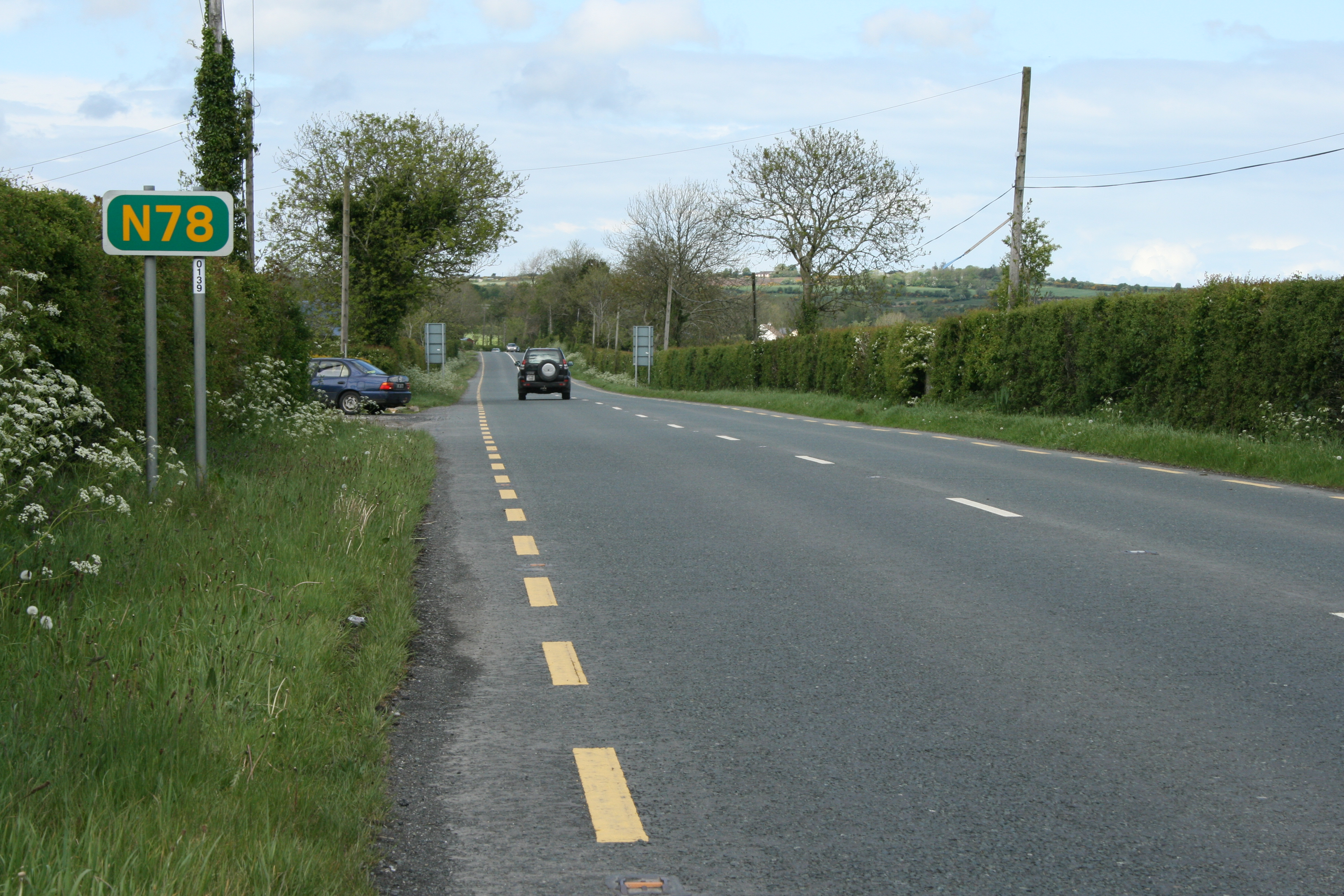
- N78 north of Newtown, County Laois

Route information
- Length: 50.671 km (31.485 mi)

Location
- Country: Ireland
- Primary destinations: County Kilkenny; Kilkenny; County Kildare; Athy; M9 motorway

Highway system
- Roads in Ireland; Motorways; Primary; Secondary; Regional

The N78 road is a national secondary road in Ireland. The 50-kilometer-long (31 mi) road links the N77 national secondary road north of Kilkenny, County Kilkenny to the M9 national primary route at Mullamast in County Kildare. En route it passes through the towns of Castlecomer in County Kilkenny, Ballylynan in County Laois, and Athy in County Kildare. It is single carriageway throughout.

Before the opening of the M9 motorway from Kilcullen to Carlow in 2009, the N78 ran from Athy to Kilcullen instead of Mullamast but the Athy-Kilcullen section was reclassified as part of the R418 regional road and a new greenfield section of N78 was constructed to join Athy to the M9.

The now R418 section once formed an integral part of the T6 - the old trunk road that connected the cities of Cork and Dublin before the contemporary numbering system was established.

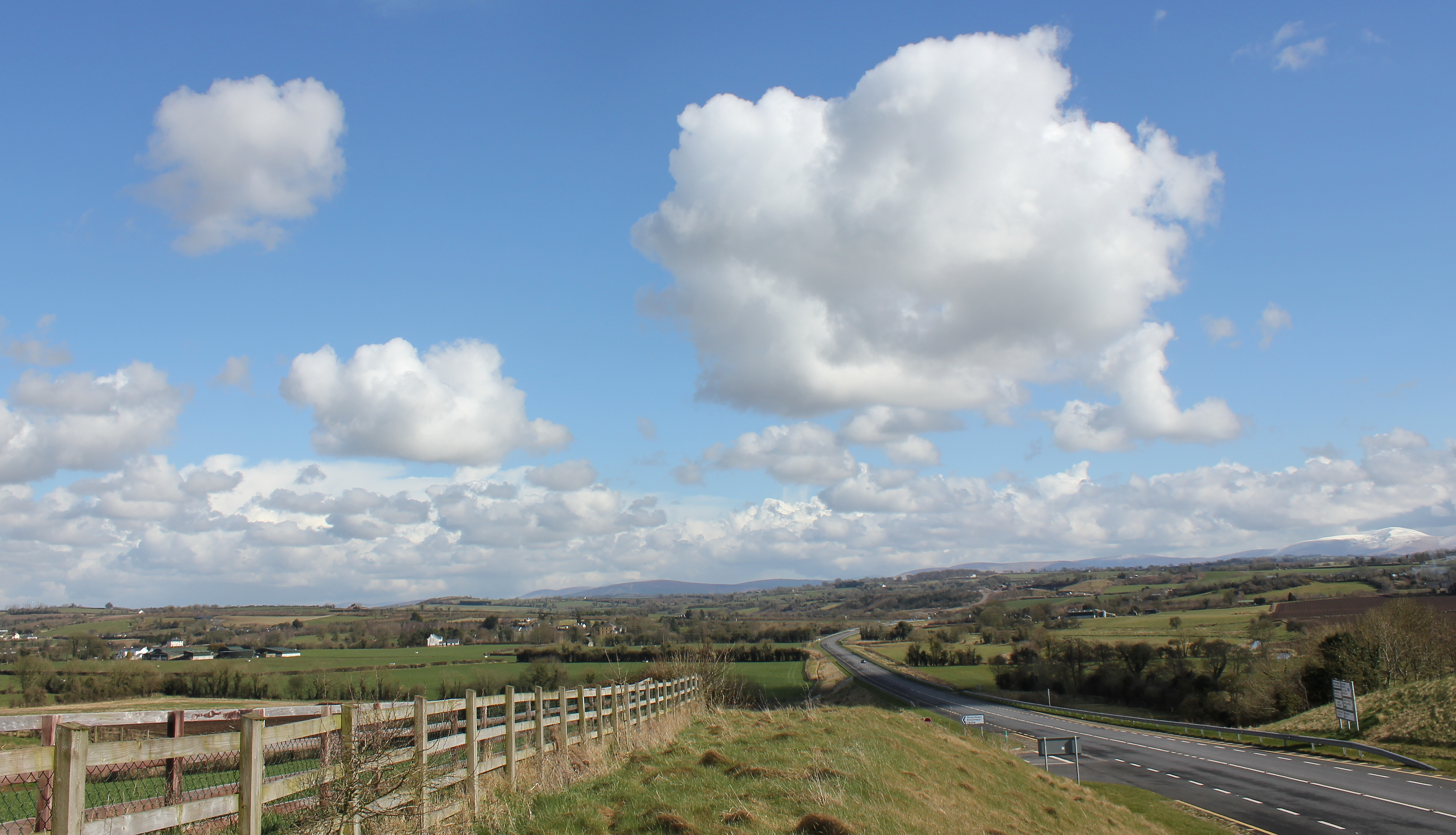
The N78 looking east, Wicklow Mountains in the background. This new section joins Athy to the M9

== See also ==
- Roads in Ireland
- Motorways in Ireland
- National primary road
- Regional road
