= List of townlands of County Wicklow =

This is a list of the townlands in County Wicklow, Ireland. There are approximately 1,370 names in the list, and duplicates occur where there is more than one townland with the same name in County Wicklow. Names marked in bold typeface are towns and villages, and the word Town appears for those entries in the Acres column.

== Townland list ==
Townland	Acres	Barony	Civil parish	Poor law union
Abbeylands	115	Arklow	Arklow	Rathdrum
Aghafarrell	12	Lower Talbotstown	Kilbride	Naas
Aghavannagh (Ram)	1,026	Ballinacor South	Ballinacor	Rathdrum
Aghavannagh (Revell)	2,769	Ballinacor South	Ballinacor	Rathdrum
Aghavannagh Mountain	1,523	Ballinacor South	Moyne	Shillelagh
Aghowle Lower	325	Newcastle	Rathnew	Rathdrum
Aghowle Lower	787	Shillelagh	Aghowle	Shillelagh
Aghowle Upper	488	Newcastle	Rathnew	Rathdrum
Aghowle Upper	556	Shillelagh	Aghowle	Shillelagh
Altidore Demesne	186	Newcastle	Kilcoole	Rathdrum
Altidore Demesne	76	Newcastle	Newcastle Upper	Rathdrum
Annacarney	168	Lower Talbotstown	Boystown	Baltinglass
Annacrivey	509	Rathdown	Powerscourt	Rathdown
Annagolan	214	Newcastle	Derrylossary	Rathdrum
Annalecky	125	Lower Talbotstown	Dunlavin	Baltinglass
Ardanairy	564	Arklow	Ennereilly	Rathdrum
Ardnaboy	278	Ballinacor South	Hacketstown	Shillelagh
Ardoyne	971	Shillelagh	Ardoyne	Shillelagh
**Arklow**	Town	Arklow	Arklow	Rathdrum
Arklow	45	Arklow	Arklow	Rathdrum
Ashford	71	Newcastle	Rathnew	Rathdrum
Ashtown	17	Arklow	Drumkay	Rathdrum
Ashtown	128	Newcastle	Rathnew	Rathdrum
Ashtown (or Ballinafunshoge)	855	Ballinacor North	Derrylossary	Rathdrum
Askakeagh	832	Ballinacor South	Preban	Shillelagh
Askintinny	204	Arklow	Arklow	Rathdrum
Athdown	1,089	Lower Talbotstown	Kilbride	Naas
Athgarvan	53	Lower Talbotstown	Hollywood	Baltinglass
Athgreany	234	Lower Talbotstown	Hollywood	Baltinglass
Aughrim Lower	266	Ballinacor South	Ballykine	Rathdrum
Aughrim Upper	682	Ballinacor South	Ballykine	Rathdrum
Aurora	219	Rathdown	Powerscourt	Rathdown
Avondale	144	Ballinacor North	Rathdrum	Rathdrum
Bahana	459	Rathdown	Powerscourt	Rathdown
Bahana	240	Newcastle	Kilcommon	Rathdrum
Bahana (King)	278	Ballinacor South	Ballykine	Rathdrum
Bahana (Whaley)	620	Ballinacor South	Ballykine	Rathdrum
Balinabarny	202	Upper Talbotstown	Donaghmore	Baltinglass
Balinabarny	522	Ballinacor North	Knockrath	Rathdrum
Balinabarny Gap	291	Upper Talbotstown	Donaghmore	Baltinglass
Balinabarny North	302	Arklow	Castlemacadam	Rathdrum
Balinabarny South	112	Arklow	Castlemacadam	Rathdrum
Balinaclash	388	Ballinacor South	Ballykine	Rathdrum
Balisland	932	Shillelagh	Moyacomb	Shillelagh
Ballagh	383	Ballinacor South	Kilpipe	Shillelagh
Ballanagh	423	Arklow	Castlemacadam	Rathdrum
Ballard	483	Ballinacor South	Ballykine	Rathdrum
Ballard	706	Ballinacor North	Knockrath	Rathdrum
Ballard	140	Shillelagh	Aghowle	Shillelagh
Ballard	705	Shillelagh	Carnew	Shillelagh
Ballard Lower	63	Arklow	Dunganstown	Rathdrum
Ballard Upper	214	Arklow	Dunganstown	Rathdrum
Ballardbeg	242	Newcastle	Derrylossary	Rathdrum
Ballardpark	205	Ballinacor North	Knockrath	Rathdrum
Balleese Lower	222	Arklow	Kilcommon	Rathdrum
Balleese Upper	169	Arklow	Kilcommon	Rathdrum
Balleese Wood	134	Arklow	Kilcommon	Rathdrum
Balleeshal	256	Ballinacor South	Ballykine	Rathdrum
Ballinabanoge	213	Arklow	Arklow	Rathdrum
Ballinabrannagh	165	Arklow	Kilbride	Rathdrum
Ballinacarrig Lower	306	Ballinacor North	Rathdrum	Rathdrum
Ballinacarrig Upper	316	Ballinacor North	Rathdrum	Rathdrum
Ballinaclea	302	Arklow	Dunganstown	Rathdrum
Ballinaclogh	513	Arklow	Glenealy	Rathdrum
Ballinacooley	439	Newcastle	Glenealy	Rathdrum
Ballinacor	2,117	Ballinacor South	Ballinacor	Rathdrum
Ballinacor	200	Arklow	Kilbride	Rathdrum
Ballinacor	174	Ballinacor South	Kilcommon	Shillelagh
Ballinacor East	271	Arklow	Dunganstown	Rathdrum
Ballinacor West	227	Arklow	Dunganstown	Rathdrum
Ballinacorbeg	452	Ballinacor North	Derrylossary	Rathdrum
Ballinacrow Lower	330	Upper Talbotstown	Rathbran	Baltinglass
Ballinacrow Upper	256	Upper Talbotstown	Rathbran	Baltinglass
Ballinafunshoge	678	Ballinacor North	Knockrath	Rathdrum
Ballinafunshoge (or Ashtown)	855	Ballinacor North	Derrylossary	Rathdrum
Ballinagappoge	656	Ballinacor South	Ballinacor	Rathdrum
Ballinagee	2,934	Lower Talbotstown	Boystown	Naas
Ballinagee	258	Rathdown	Powerscourt	Rathdown
Ballinagoneen	940	Ballinacor North	Knockrath	Rathdrum
Ballinagore	290	Arklow	Ballintemple	Rathdrum
Ballinaheese	86	Arklow	Kilbride	Rathdrum
Ballinahinch	194	Newcastle	Calary	Rathdrum
Ballinahinch	227	Newcastle	Killiskey	Rathdrum
Ballinahinch Lower	178	Newcastle	Newcastle Upper	Rathdrum
Ballinahinch Middle	360	Newcastle	Newcastle Upper	Rathdrum
Ballinahinch Upper	736	Newcastle	Newcastle Upper	Rathdrum
Ballinahown	709	Lower Talbotstown	Boystown	Naas
Ballinakill	319	Arklow	Kilbride	Rathdrum
Ballinakill	826	Newcastle	Kilcommon	Rathdrum
**Ballinalea**	Town	Newcastle	Rathnew	Rathdrum
Ballinalea	128	Newcastle	Rathnew	Rathdrum
**Ballinameesda**	Town	Arklow	Dunganstown	Rathdrum
Ballinameesda Lower	224	Arklow	Dunganstown	Rathdrum
Ballinameesda Upper	204	Arklow	Dunganstown	Rathdrum
Ballinamona	331	Arklow	Castlemacadam	Rathdrum
Ballinanty	69	Ballinacor South	Ballinacor	Rathdrum
Ballinapark	147	Arklow	Castlemacadam	Rathdrum
Ballinapark	310	Newcastle	Rathnew	Rathdrum
Ballinard	328	Upper Talbotstown	Donaghmore	Baltinglass
Ballinasilloge	387	Arklow	Ballintemple	Rathdrum
Ballinasilloge	286	Ballinacor South	Hacketstown	Shillelagh
Ballinaskea	1,186	Ballinacor South	Ballinacor	Rathdrum
Ballinaskea	478	Arklow	Ennereilly	Rathdrum
Ballinasoostia	121	Newcastle	Calary	Rathdrum
Ballinastoe	6,602	Ballinacor North	Calary	Rathdrum
Ballinastraw	159	Arklow	Castlemacadam	Rathdrum
Ballinastraw	233	Newcastle	Kilcommon	Rathdrum
Ballinatone Lower	164	Ballinacor South	Ballinacor	Rathdrum
Ballinatone Upper	215	Ballinacor South	Ballinacor	Rathdrum
Ballinclare	182	Arklow	Dunganstown	Rathdrum
Ballinclea	310	Upper Talbotstown	Donaghmore	Baltinglass
Ballinclea	356	Arklow	Kilbride	Rathdrum
Ballinderry Lower	231	Ballinacor North	Rathdrum	Rathdrum
Ballinderry Upper	326	Ballinacor North	Rathdrum	Rathdrum
Ballindoyle	111	Arklow	Kilcommon	Rathdrum
Ballineddan Lower	121	Upper Talbotstown	Donaghmore	Baltinglass
Ballineddan Mountain	383	Upper Talbotstown	Donaghmore	Baltinglass
Ballineddan Upper	293	Upper Talbotstown	Donaghmore	Baltinglass
Ballinfoyle Lower	312	Upper Talbotstown	Donaghmore	Baltinglass
Ballinfoyle Upper	259	Upper Talbotstown	Donaghmore	Baltinglass
Ballingate	625	Shillelagh	Carnew	Shillelagh
Ballingate Lower	525	Shillelagh	Carnew	Shillelagh
Ballingate Upper	854	Shillelagh	Carnew	Shillelagh
Ballinglen	1,047	Ballinacor South	Preban	Shillelagh
**Ballinguile**	Town	Ballinacor South	Kiltegan	Baltinglass
Ballinguile	399	Ballinacor South	Kiltegan	Baltinglass
Ballinguilehill	320	Ballinacor South	Kiltegan	Baltinglass
Ballinroan Lower	179	Upper Talbotstown	Kilranelagh	Baltinglass
Ballinroan Upper	183	Upper Talbotstown	Kilranelagh	Baltinglass
Ballinrush	569	Ballinacor North	Calary	Rathdrum
Ballintemple	479	Arklow	Ballintemple	Rathdrum
Ballinteskin	94	Rathdown	Calary	Rathdown
Ballinteskin	235	Rathdown	Kilmacanoge	Rathdown
Ballinteskin	707	Arklow	Glenealy	Rathdrum
Ballintim	46	Arklow	Redcross	Rathdrum
Ballintober	377	Lower Talbotstown	Hollywood	Baltinglass
Ballintombay	125	Arklow	Arklow	Rathdrum
Ballintombay Lower	439	Ballinacor North	Knockrath	Rathdrum
Ballintombay Upper	581	Ballinacor North	Knockrath	Rathdrum
Ballintruer Beg	111	Upper Talbotstown	Donaghmore	Baltinglass
Ballintruer More	182	Upper Talbotstown	Donaghmore	Baltinglass
Ballinvalla (or Sleamaine)	540	Ballinacor North	Calary	Rathdrum
Ballinvally	211	Arklow	Killahurler	Rathdrum
Ballinvally (Valentine)	386	Arklow	Castlemacadam	Rathdrum
Ballinvally (Wisdom)	382	Arklow	Castlemacadam	Rathdrum
Ballinvally Lower	188	Arklow	Killahurler	Rathdrum
Ballinvally Lower	251	Arklow	Redcross	Rathdrum
Ballinvally Upper	168	Arklow	Killahurler	Rathdrum
Ballinvally Upper	201	Arklow	Redcross	Rathdrum
Ballinashinnagh	172	Newcastle	Calary	Rathdrum
Ballyarthur	448	Arklow	Castlemacadam	Rathdrum
Ballybawn Lower	148	Rathdown	Kilmacanoge	Rathdown
Ballybawn Upper	24	Rathdown	Kilmacanoge	Rathdown
Ballybeg	231	Newcastle	Rathnew	Rathdrum
Ballybeg	891	Ballinacor South	Kilcommon	Shillelagh
Ballybla	272	Newcastle	Killiskey	Rathdrum
Ballyboy	1,023	Ballinacor North	Knockrath	Rathdrum
Ballybrack Beg	199	Upper Talbotstown	Kiltegan	Baltinglass
Ballybrack More	302	Upper Talbotstown	Kiltegan	Baltinglass
Ballybraid	897	Ballinacor North	Knockrath	Rathdrum
Ballybrew	594	Rathdown	Powerscourt	Rathdown
Ballycapple	252	Arklow	Dunganstown	Rathdrum
Ballycapple Hill	97	Arklow	Dunganstown	Rathdrum
Ballycarrigeen	60	Ballinacor North	Rathdrum	Rathdrum
Ballyclogh North	186	Arklow	Dunganstown	Rathdrum
Ballyclogh South	93	Arklow	Dunganstown	Rathdrum
Ballyconnell	946	Shillelagh	Crecrin	Shillelagh
Ballycoog Lower	452	Arklow	Ballintemple	Rathdrum
Ballycoog Upper	311	Arklow	Ballintemple	Rathdrum
Ballycooleen	272	Arklow	Castlemacadam	Rathdrum
Ballycore	266	Upper Talbotstown	Rathtoole	Baltinglass
Ballycoyle	154	Rathdown	Powerscourt	Rathdown
Ballycreen Lower	385	Ballinacor South	Ballinacor	Rathdrum
Ballycreen Upper	953	Ballinacor South	Ballinacor	Rathdrum
Ballycrone	76	Newcastle	Newcastle Lower	Rathdrum
Ballycullen	1,237	Newcastle	Rathnew	Rathdrum
Ballycumber North	283	Ballinacor South	Kilcommon	Shillelagh
Ballycumber South	584	Ballinacor South	Kilcommon	Shillelagh
Ballycurragh	588	Ballinacor South	Moyne	Shillelagh
Ballycurry Demesne	352	Newcastle	Killiskey	Rathdrum
Ballydonagh	94	Rathdown	Delgany	Rathdown
Ballydonarea	78	Newcastle	Kilcoole	Rathdrum
Ballydonarea	273	Newcastle	Newcastle Lower	Rathdrum
Ballydonnell	415	Arklow	Redcross	Rathdrum
Ballydonnell North	560	Lower Talbotstown	Blessington	Naas
Ballydonnell South	1,279	Lower Talbotstown	Blessington	Naas
Ballydoreen	202	Newcastle	Killiskey	Rathdrum
Ballydowling	162	Arklow	Dunganstown	Rathdrum
Ballydowling	524	Newcastle	Glenealy	Rathdrum
Ballydowling	202	Ballinacor North	Rathdrum	Rathdrum
Ballydowling Hill	362	Ballinacor North	Rathdrum	Rathdrum
Ballyduff	146	Arklow	Arklow	Rathdrum
Ballyduff Lower	145	Newcastle	Killiskey	Rathdrum
Ballyduff North	102	Arklow	Arklow	Rathdrum
Ballyduff South	172	Arklow	Arklow	Rathdrum
Ballyduff Upper	310	Newcastle	Killiskey	Rathdrum
Ballyeustace	18	Ballinacor South	Ballykine	Rathdrum
Ballyflanigan	171	Arklow	Dunganstown	Rathdrum
Ballyfolan	848	Lower Talbotstown	Kilbride	Naas
Ballyfoyle	433	Lower Talbotstown	Kilbride	Naas
Ballyfree East	43	Newcastle	Glenealy	Rathdrum
Ballyfree West	254	Newcastle	Glenealy	Rathdrum
Ballygahan Lower	85	Arklow	Castlemacadam	Rathdrum
Ballygahan Upper	251	Arklow	Castlemacadam	Rathdrum
Ballygannon	322	Newcastle	Kilcoole	Rathdrum
Ballygannon	299	Ballinacor North	Rathdrum	Rathdrum
Ballygannon Beg	315	Arklow	Dunganstown	Rathdrum
Ballygannon More	315	Arklow	Dunganstown	Rathdrum
Ballygarret	55	Newcastle	Newcastle Upper	Rathdrum
Ballygillaroe	132	Arklow	Redcross	Rathdrum
Ballygobban	560	Ballinacor South	Moyne	Shillelagh
Ballygonnell	198	Arklow	Drumkay	Rathdrum
Ballygriffin	263	Arklow	Arklow	Rathdrum
Ballyguile Beg	249	Arklow	Kilpoole	Rathdrum
Ballyguile More	398	Arklow	Kilpoole	Rathdrum
Ballyhad Lower	259	Ballinacor North	Rathdrum	Rathdrum
Ballyhad Upper	209	Ballinacor North	Rathdrum	Rathdrum
Ballyhara	123	Arklow	Drumkay	Rathdrum
Ballyhara	60	Arklow	Dunganstown	Rathdrum
Ballyhenry	198	Newcastle	Killiskey	Rathdrum
Ballyherrig	121	Arklow	Dunganstown	Rathdrum
Ballyhook	209	Upper Talbotstown	Rathbran	Baltinglass
Ballyhook Demesne	200	Upper Talbotstown	Rathbran	Baltinglass
Ballyhook Hill	271	Upper Talbotstown	Rathbran	Baltinglass
Ballyhorsey	55	Newcastle	Kilcoole	Rathdrum
Ballyhubbock Lower	145	Upper Talbotstown	Donaghmore	Baltinglass
Ballyhubbock Upper	244	Upper Talbotstown	Donaghmore	Baltinglass
Ballyhurtim	112	Upper Talbotstown	Rathsallagh	Baltinglass
Ballykean (Annesley)	260	Arklow	Redcross	Rathdrum
Ballykean (Penrose)	375	Arklow	Redcross	Rathdrum
Ballykean (Stringer)	190	Arklow	Redcross	Rathdrum
Ballykelly	406	Shillelagh	Carnew	Shillelagh
Ballykeppoge	96	Arklow	Dunganstown	Rathdrum
Ballykillageer Lower	302	Arklow	Ballintemple	Rathdrum
Ballykillageer Upper	372	Arklow	Ballintemple	Rathdrum
Ballykillavane	284	Newcastle	Glenealy	Rathdrum
Ballykilmurry Lower	382	Upper Talbotstown	Kiltegan	Baltinglass
Ballykilmurry Upper	220	Upper Talbotstown	Kiltegan	Baltinglass
**Ballyknockan**	Town	Lower Talbotstown	Boystown	Naas
Ballyknockan	174	Upper Talbotstown	Kiltegan	Baltinglass
Ballyknockan	1,112	Lower Talbotstown	Boystown	Naas
Ballyknockan Beg	197	Newcastle	Glenealy	Rathdrum
Ballyknockan Lower	153	Ballinacor North	Rathdrum	Rathdrum
Ballyknockan More	392	Newcastle	Glenealy	Rathdrum
Ballyknockan Upper	302	Ballinacor North	Rathdrum	Rathdrum
Ballyknocker	302	Shillelagh	Carnew	Shillelagh
Ballyknocker East	31	Shillelagh	Moyacomb	Shillelagh
Ballyknocker West	53	Shillelagh	Moyacomb	Shillelagh
Ballylaffin	190	Upper Talbotstown	Rathsallagh	Baltinglass
Ballylea	257	Upper Talbotstown	Dunlavin	Baltinglass
Ballylerane	179	Rathdown	Powerscourt	Rathdown
Ballylion Bawn	38	Lower Talbotstown	Donard	Baltinglass
Ballylion Lower	179	Lower Talbotstown	Donard	Baltinglass
Ballylion Upper	137	Lower Talbotstown	Donard	Baltinglass
Ballyloughlin	132	Newcastle	Newcastle Lower	Rathdrum
Ballylow	1,643	Lower Talbotstown	Blessington	Naas
Ballylug	503	Ballinacor North	Knockrath	Rathdrum
Ballylusk	336	Ballinacor North	Knockrath	Rathdrum
Ballylusk	378	Newcastle	Rathnew	Rathdrum
Ballymacahara	204	Newcastle	Rathnew	Rathdrum
Ballymaconey	217	Upper Talbotstown	Kiltegan	Baltinglass
Ballymacsimon	419	Newcastle	Glenealy	Rathdrum
Ballymaghroe	686	Newcastle	Killiskey	Rathdrum
Ballymaghroe	352	Ballinacor South	Hacketstown	Shillelagh
Ballymaghroe	414	Ballinacor South	Moyne	Shillelagh
Ballymanus	1,077	Ballinacor South	Kilpipe	Shillelagh
Ballymanus Lower	152	Newcastle	Glenealy	Rathdrum
Ballymanus Upper	629	Newcastle	Glenealy	Rathdrum
Ballymarroge	393	Shillelagh	Mullinacuff	Shillelagh
Ballymerrigan	385	Newcastle	Glenealy	Rathdrum
Ballymoat	185	Newcastle	Glenealy	Rathdrum
Ballymoneen	418	Arklow	Castlemacadam	Rathdrum
Ballymoneen	362	Newcastle	Killiskey	Rathdrum
Ballymoney	188	Ballinacor South	Ballykine	Rathdrum
Ballymoney	345	Arklow	Dunganstown	Rathdrum
Ballymoney	256	Arklow	Kilbride	Rathdrum
Ballymooney	714	Lower Talbotstown	Donard	Baltinglass
Ballymorris	25	Rathdown	Bray	Rathdown
Ballymorris Lower	208	Ballinacor South	Ballykine	Rathdrum
Ballymorris Upper	288	Ballinacor South	Ballykine	Rathdrum
Ballymoyle	495	Arklow	Ennereilly	Rathdrum
Ballymurrin Lower	194	Arklow	Dunganstown	Rathdrum
Ballymurrin Upper	210	Arklow	Dunganstown	Rathdrum
Ballymurtagh	172	Arklow	Castlemacadam	Rathdrum
Ballynabarny	745	Newcastle	Glenealy	Rathdrum
Ballynabrocky	3,613	Lower Talbotstown	Blessington	Naas
Ballynacarrig	560	Arklow	Dunganstown	Rathdrum
Ballynagran	152	Arklow	Dunganstown	Rathdrum
Ballynagran	232	Arklow	Glenealy	Rathdrum
Ballynamanoge	538	Ballinacor South	Kilcommon	Shillelagh
Ballynamona	161	Arklow	Redcross	Rathdrum
Ballynamuddagh	470	Rathdown	Bray	Rathdown
Ballynapark	193	Arklow	Dunganstown	Rathdrum
Ballynasculloge Lower	376	Lower Talbotstown	Blessington	Naas
Ballynasculloge Upper	773	Lower Talbotstown	Blessington	Naas
Ballynastocka	1,504	Lower Talbotstown	Boystown	Naas
Ballynatona	690	Lower Talbotstown	Blessington	Naas
Ballynatone	108	Upper Talbotstown	Rathbran	Baltinglass
Ballynattin	150	Arklow	Arklow	Rathdrum
Ballynavortha	320	Shillelagh	Moyacomb	Shillelagh
Ballynerrin	244	Newcastle	Kilcoole	Rathdrum
Ballynerrin	290	Newcastle	Rathnew	Rathdrum
Ballynerrin Lower	245	Arklow	Drumkay	Rathdrum
Ballynerrin Upper	187	Arklow	Drumkay	Rathdrum
Ballynultagh	2,889	Lower Talbotstown	Boystown	Naas
Ballynultagh	1,719	Shillelagh	Mullinacuff	Shillelagh
Ballynure	182	Upper Talbotstown	Ballynure	Baltinglass
Ballynure Demesne	294	Upper Talbotstown	Ballynure	Baltinglass
Ballynure Park	122	Upper Talbotstown	Ballynure	Baltinglass
Ballyorney	68	Rathdown	Kilmacanoge	Rathdown
Ballyphilip	64	Newcastle	Newcastle Lower	Rathdrum
Ballyraheen	721	Shillelagh	Mullinacuff	Shillelagh
Ballyraine Lower	74	Arklow	Arklow	Rathdrum
Ballyraine Middle	229	Arklow	Arklow	Rathdrum
Ballyraine Upper	153	Arklow	Arklow	Rathdrum
Ballyreagh	222	Rathdown	Powerscourt	Rathdown
Ballyreask	266	Upper Talbotstown	Donaghmore	Baltinglass
Ballyremon Commons	641	Rathdown	Calary	Rathdown
Ballyrichard	253	Arklow	Kilbride	Rathdrum
Ballyrogan Lower	321	Arklow	Redcross	Rathdrum
Ballyrogan Upper	221	Arklow	Redcross	Rathdrum
Ballyronan	155	Newcastle	Kilcoole	Rathdrum
Ballyrooaun	91	Arklow	Arklow	Rathdrum
Ballyross	352	Rathdown	Powerscourt	Rathdown
Ballyrush	205	Arklow	Killahurler	Rathdrum
Ballysallagh East	189	Arklow	Dunganstown	Rathdrum
Ballysallagh West	87	Arklow	Dunganstown	Rathdrum
Ballyshane	939	Ballinacor South	Ballykine	Rathdrum
Ballysheeman	93	Ballinacor North	Knockrath	Rathdrum
Ballysheeman	61	Ballinacor North	Rathdrum	Rathdrum
Ballyshonog	575	Ballinacor South	Kilcommon	Shillelagh
Ballysize Lower	191	Lower Talbotstown	Hollywood	Baltinglass
Ballysize Upper	112	Lower Talbotstown	Hollywood	Baltinglass
Ballysmuttan	347	Lower Talbotstown	Blessington	Naas
Ballysmuttan	198	Lower Talbotstown	Blessington	Naas
Ballyteige	131	Ballinacor North	Knockrath	Rathdrum
Ballyteige	552	Ballinacor South	Moyne	Shillelagh
Ballytoole Lower	267	Upper Talbotstown	Donaghmore	Baltinglass
Ballytoole Upper	238	Upper Talbotstown	Donaghmore	Baltinglass
Ballytrasna	165	Ballinacor North	Rathdrum	Rathdrum
Ballytunny	142	Arklow	Ennereilly	Rathdrum
Ballyvoghan	249	Upper Talbotstown	Donaghmore	Baltinglass
Ballyvolan Lower	216	Newcastle	Killiskey	Rathdrum
Ballyvolan Upper	56	Newcastle	Killiskey	Rathdrum
Ballyvraghan	183	Upper Talbotstown	Donaghmore	Baltinglass
Ballywaltrin	114	Rathdown	Bray	Rathdown
Ballyward	345	Lower Talbotstown	Blessington	Naas
**Baltinglass**	Town	Upper Talbotstown	Baltinglass	Baltinglass
Baltinglass East	221	Upper Talbotstown	Baltinglass	Baltinglass
Baltinglass West	210	Upper Talbotstown	Baltinglass	Baltinglass
Baltyboys Lower (or Boystown)	1,142	Lower Talbotstown	Boystown	Naas
Baltyboys Upper (or Boystown)	810	Lower Talbotstown	Boystown	Naas
Baltynanima	629	Ballinacor North	Derrylossary	Rathdrum
Balyvaltron	346	Arklow	Dunganstown	Rathdrum
Bannagroe	30	Lower Talbotstown	Hollywood	Baltinglass
**Baravore**	Town	Ballinacor South	Ballinacor	Rathdrum
Baravore	1,205	Ballinacor South	Ballinacor	Rathdrum
Barchuillia Commons	243	Rathdown	Kilmacanoge	Rathdown
Barnacashel	119	Shillelagh	Aghowle	Shillelagh
Barnacleagh East	190	Arklow	Killahurler	Rathdrum
Barnacleagh North	173	Arklow	Killahurler	Rathdrum
Barnacoyle Big	218	Newcastle	Killiskey	Rathdrum
Barnacoyle Little	21	Newcastle	Killiskey	Rathdrum
Barnaleagh South	171	Arklow	Killahurler	Rathdrum
Barnameelia	397	Ballinacor South	Moyne	Shillelagh
Barnamire	267	Rathdown	Powerscourt	Rathdown
Barnamuinga	305	Shillelagh	Moyacomb	Shillelagh
Barnbawn	343	Newcastle	Kilcommon	Rathdrum
Baronstown Lower	233	Upper Talbotstown	Ballynure	Baltinglass
Baronstown Upper	281	Upper Talbotstown	Ballynure	Baltinglass
Barraderry East	100	Upper Talbotstown	Kilranelagh	Baltinglass
Barraderry North	152	Upper Talbotstown	Kilranelagh	Baltinglass
Barraderry West	435	Upper Talbotstown	Kilranelagh	Baltinglass
Barranisky East	167	Arklow	Kilbride	Rathdrum
Barranisky West	332	Arklow	Kilbride	Rathdrum
Bawnoge	206	Upper Talbotstown	Baltinglass	Baltinglass
Bawnoge	273	Lower Talbotstown	Boystown	Baltinglass
Bawnoge	146	Upper Talbotstown	Kiltegan	Baltinglass
Bellevue Demesne	603	Rathdown	Delgany	Rathdown
Bellevue Demesne	15	Newcastle	Kilcoole	Rathdrum
Bellpark	118	Arklow	Dunganstown	Rathdrum
Belmont Demesne	54	Rathdown	Delgany	Rathdown
Bernagh	165	Upper Talbotstown	Kiltegan	Baltinglass
Birchwood	157	Newcastle	Killiskey	Rathdrum
Blackditch	150	Arklow	Drumkay	Rathdrum
Blackditch	220	Newcastle	Killiskey	Rathdrum
Blackditch	365	Newcastle	Newcastle Lower	Rathdrum
Blackditches Lower	158	Lower Talbotstown	Boystown	Baltinglass
Blackditches Upper	157	Lower Talbotstown	Boystown	Baltinglass
Blackhill	85	Lower Talbotstown	Dunlavin	Baltinglass
Blackmoor	303	Upper Talbotstown	Donard	Baltinglass
Blackpits	315	Upper Talbotstown	Donaghmore	Baltinglass
Blackrock	221	Lower Talbotstown	Blessington	Naas
Blackrock	308	Ballinacor South	Moyne	Shillelagh
Blainroe Lower	273	Arklow	Kilpoole	Rathdrum
Blainroe Upper	242	Arklow	Kilpoole	Rathdrum
Blakestown Lower	138	Lower Talbotstown	Hollywood	Naas
Blakestown Upper	152	Lower Talbotstown	Hollywood	Naas
Blane	269	Upper Talbotstown	Donaghmore	Baltinglass
**Blessington**	Town	Lower Talbotstown	Blessington	Naas
Blessington	136	Lower Talbotstown	Blessington	Naas
Blessington Demesne	411	Lower Talbotstown	Blessington	Naas
Blindwood	142	Arklow	Redcross	Rathdrum
Bogland	109	Arklow	Arklow	Rathdrum
Boherboy	189	Lower Talbotstown	Dunlavin	Baltinglass
Bolagh Lower	152	Arklow	Dunganstown	Rathdrum
Bolagh Upper	171	Arklow	Dunganstown	Rathdrum
Boley	231	Upper Talbotstown	Baltinglass	Baltinglass
Boley	660	Shillelagh	Aghowle	Shillelagh
Boleybawn	303	Shillelagh	Crosspatrick	Shillelagh
Boleycarrigeen	297	Upper Talbotstown	Kilranelagh	Baltinglass
Boleylug	151	Upper Talbotstown	Baltinglass	Baltinglass
Boleynass Lower	226	Newcastle	Killiskey	Rathdrum
Boleynass Upper	159	Newcastle	Killiskey	Rathdrum
Bollarney Murragh	32	Newcastle	Rathnew	Rathdrum
Bollarney North	139	Newcastle	Rathnew	Rathdrum
Bollarney South	34	Newcastle	Rathnew	Rathdrum
Bonabrocka	243	Arklow	Dunganstown	Rathdrum
Bonagrew	171	Arklow	Dunganstown	Rathdrum
Bonagrew Little	15	Arklow	Dunganstown	Rathdrum
Borkill Beg	453	Upper Talbotstown	Kiltegan	Baltinglass
Borkill More	594	Upper Talbotstown	Kiltegan	Baltinglass
Boystown (or Baltyboys Lower)	1,142	Lower Talbotstown	Boystown	Naas
Boystown (or Baltyboys Upper)	810	Lower Talbotstown	Boystown	Naas
**Bray**	Town	Rathdown	Bray	Rathdown
Bray	334	Rathdown	Bray	Rathdown
Bray Commons	8	Rathdown	Bray	Rathdown
Breagura	38	Arklow	Dunganstown	Rathdrum
Brewershill	88	Lower Talbotstown	Dunlavin	Baltinglass
Bridgeland	66	Ballinacor South	Kilcommon	Shillelagh
Britonstown	306	Lower Talbotstown	Hollywood	Naas
Brittas	413	Upper Talbotstown	Donaghmore	Baltinglass
Brittas	245	Lower Talbotstown	Kilbride	Naas
Brittas	626	Arklow	Dunganstown	Rathdrum
Brockagh	4,811	Ballinacor North	Derrylossary	Rathdrum
Brockna	348	Upper Talbotstown	Kilranelagh	Baltinglass
Bromley	71	Newcastle	Kilcoole	Rathdrum
Broomfield	49	Newcastle	Killiskey	Rathdrum
Broomfields	99	Lower Talbotstown	Donard	Baltinglass
Broomhall	168	Newcastle	Rathnew	Rathdrum
Broughills Hill	67	Lower Talbotstown	Hollywood	Baltinglass
Brusselstown	360	Upper Talbotstown	Donaghmore	Baltinglass
Bullford	186	Newcastle	Kilcoole	Rathdrum
Burgage More	671	Lower Talbotstown	Burgage	Naas
Burgage Moyle	322	Lower Talbotstown	Burgage	Naas
Burkeen	63	Newcastle	Rathnew	Rathdrum
Burrow	182	Upper Talbotstown	Ballynure	Baltinglass
Bushfield	152	Upper Talbotstown	Donaghmore	Baltinglass
Butter Mountain	935	Lower Talbotstown	Kilbride	Naas
Butterhill	407	Lower Talbotstown	Blessington	Naas
Byrneshill	171	Upper Talbotstown	Freynestown	Baltinglass
Calary Lower	771	Rathdown	Calary	Rathdown
Calary Upper	554	Rathdown	Calary	Rathdown
Callowhill Lower	241	Newcastle	Newcastle Upper	Rathdrum
Callowhill Upper	361	Newcastle	Newcastle Upper	Rathdrum
Camaderry (or Sevenchurches)	4,518	Ballinacor North	Derrylossary	Rathdrum
Camara	228	Upper Talbotstown	Donaghmore	Baltinglass
Camarahill North	251	Upper Talbotstown	Donaghmore	Baltinglass
Camarahill South	229	Upper Talbotstown	Donaghmore	Baltinglass
Camenabologue	1,043	Ballinacor South	Knockrath	Rathdrum
Cannow	321	Upper Talbotstown	Donaghmore	Baltinglass
Cannow Mountain	1,128	Upper Talbotstown	Donaghmore	Baltinglass
Cappagh	583	Ballinacor South	Ballinacor	Rathdrum
**Carnew**	Town	Shillelagh	Carnew	Shillelagh
Carnew	936	Shillelagh	Carnew	Shillelagh
Carrawaystick	1,178	Ballinacor South	Knockrath	Rathdrum
Carrick	316	Ballinacor South	Kilcommon	Shillelagh
Carrig	381	Lower Talbotstown	Boystown	Naas
Carrig Lower	184	Upper Talbotstown	Kiltegan	Baltinglass
Carrig Mountain	224	Upper Talbotstown	Kiltegan	Baltinglass
Carrig Upper	183	Upper Talbotstown	Kiltegan	Baltinglass
Carrigacurra	995	Lower Talbotstown	Boystown	Baltinglass
Carrigatheme	252	Ballinacor South	Kiltegan	Baltinglass
Carrigeenduff	3,514	Ballinacor North	Derrylossary	Rathdrum
Carrigeenshinnagh	877	Ballinacor North	Derrylossary	Rathdrum
Carriggower	900	Newcastle	Calary	Rathdrum
Carriglinneen	998	Ballinacor North	Knockrath	Rathdrum
Carrigmore	162	Arklow	Dunganstown	Rathdrum
Carrignagower	205	Lower Talbotstown	Kilbride	Naas
Carrignamuck	452	Ballinacor South	Hacketstown	Shillelagh
Carrignamuck Lower	231	Newcastle	Killiskey	Rathdrum
Carrignamuck Upper	291	Newcastle	Killiskey	Rathdrum
Carrignamweel	448	Ballinacor South	Hacketstown	Shillelagh
Carrigoona Commons East	97	Rathdown	Kilmacanoge	Rathdown
Carrigoona Commons West	102	Rathdown	Kilmacanoge	Rathdown
Carrigroe	562	Ballinacor North	Derrylossary	Rathdrum
Carrigroe	329	Ballinacor South	Moyne	Shillelagh
Carrowbawn	164	Newcastle	Killiskey	Rathdrum
Carrycole	329	Arklow	Kilbride	Rathdrum
Carsrock	138	Upper Talbotstown	Baltinglass	Baltinglass
Caslteruddery Upper	199	Upper Talbotstown	Donaghmore	Baltinglass
Castleallagh	248	Upper Talbotstown	Donaghmore	Baltinglass
Castlegrange	306	Newcastle	Killiskey	Rathdrum
Castlehoward	210	Arklow	Castlemacadam	Rathdrum
Castlekevin	1,148	Ballinacor North	Derrylossary	Rathdrum
Castlemacadam	192	Arklow	Castlemacadam	Rathdrum
Castlequarter	180	Upper Talbotstown	Donaghmore	Baltinglass
Castleruddery Lower	328	Upper Talbotstown	Donaghmore	Baltinglass
Castletimon	467	Arklow	Dunganstown	Rathdrum
Chapel	189	Arklow	Redcross	Rathdrum
Charlesland	198	Newcastle	Kilcoole	Rathdrum
Charleville Demesne	196	Rathdown	Kilmacanoge	Rathdown
Cherrymount	106	Arklow	Castlemacadam	Rathdrum
Churchland	81	Ballinacor South	Kilcommon	Shillelagh
Clara More	323	Ballinacor North	Knockrath	Rathdrum
Clarabeg North	443	Ballinacor North	Knockrath	Rathdrum
Clarabeg South	135	Ballinacor North	Knockrath	Rathdrum
Clogga	110	Arklow	Arklow	Rathdrum
Clogh Lower	294	Upper Talbotstown	Baltinglass	Baltinglass
Clogh Upper	176	Upper Talbotstown	Baltinglass	Baltinglass
Cloghcastle	229	Upper Talbotstown	Baltinglass	Baltinglass
Cloghleagh	700	Lower Talbotstown	Kilbride	Naas
Cloghnagaune	144	Upper Talbotstown	Kilranelagh	Baltinglass
Cloghoge	6,583	Ballinacor North	Derrylossary	Rathdrum
Cloghoge	32	Arklow	Dunganstown	Rathdrum
Clohernagh	940	Ballinacor South	Ballinacor	Rathdrum
Clone	647	Ballinacor South	Kilpipe	Rathdrum
Cloneen	346	Ballinacor South	Ballykine	Rathdrum
Clonerkin	355	Ballinacor South	Ballykine	Rathdrum
Clonkeen	427	Ballinacor South	Ballinacor	Rathdrum
Clonmannan	688	Newcastle	Rathnew	Rathdrum
Clonpadden	94	Arklow	Ennereilly	Rathdrum
Clonshannon	202	Upper Talbotstown	Donaghmore	Baltinglass
Clonwilliam	356	Arklow	Killahurler	Rathdrum
Cloon	693	Rathdown	Powerscourt	Rathdown
Clora	274	Newcastle	Killiskey	Rathdrum
Clornagh	119	Upper Talbotstown	Donaghmore	Baltinglass
Coan	370	Upper Talbotstown	Donaghmore	Baltinglass
Colliga	347	Upper Talbotstown	Donaghmore	Baltinglass
Colvinstown Lower	181	Upper Talbotstown	Kilranelagh	Baltinglass
Colvinstown Upper	177	Upper Talbotstown	Kilranelagh	Baltinglass
Commons	6	Newcastle	Rathnew	Rathdrum
Conavalla	778	Ballinacor North	Knockrath	Rathdrum
Conlan's Hill	78	Lower Talbotstown	Hollywood	Baltinglass
Connary Lower	138	Arklow	Castlemacadam	Rathdrum
Connary Upper	227	Arklow	Castlemacadam	Rathdrum
Cookstown	300	Rathdown	Powerscourt	Rathdown
Coolacork	252	Arklow	Dunganstown	Rathdrum
Cooladangan	204	Arklow	Arklow	Rathdrum
Cooladoyle	68	Newcastle	Newcastle Upper	Rathdrum
Coolafaney	904	Shillelagh	Crosspatrick	Shillelagh
Coolaflake	278	Ballinacor South	Ballykine	Rathdrum
Coolafunshogue	618	Ballinacor South	Kilcommon	Shillelagh
Coolagad	285	Rathdown	Delgany	Rathdown
Coolahullin	371	Arklow	Ballintemple	Rathdrum
Coolakay	242	Rathdown	Kilmacanoge	Rathdown
Coolalug	529	Ballinacor South	Kilpipe	Shillelagh
Coolamadra	257	Upper Talbotstown	Donaghmore	Baltinglass
Coolanearl	227	Arklow	Redcross	Rathdrum
Coolastingan	83	Arklow	Arklow	Rathdrum
Coolastingan	61	Arklow	Inch	Rathdrum
Coolatin	1,204	Shillelagh	Carnew	Shillelagh
Coolatin Park	454	Shillelagh	Carnew	Shillelagh
Coolawinnia	398	Newcastle	Rathnew	Rathdrum
Coolballintaggart	635	Ballinacor South	Moyne	Shillelagh
Coolballintaggart (or Coolbawn)	1,137	Ballinacor South	Kilpipe	Shillelagh
Coolbawn (or Coolballintaggart)	1,137	Ballinacor South	Kilpipe	Shillelagh
Coolbeg	371	Arklow	Glenealy	Rathdrum
Coolboy	257	Arklow	Kilbride	Rathdrum
Coolboy	664	Shillelagh	Carnew	Shillelagh
Cooldross Lower	205	Newcastle	Newcastle Lower	Rathdrum
Cooldross Middle	76	Newcastle	Newcastle Lower	Rathdrum
Cooldross Upper	49	Newcastle	Newcastle Lower	Rathdrum
Coolgarrow	485	Ballinacor South	Ballinacor	Rathdrum
Coolgarrow	234	Arklow	Ballintemple	Rathdrum
Coolharbour Lower	45	Lower Talbotstown	Donard	Baltinglass
Coolharbour Upper	92	Lower Talbotstown	Donard	Baltinglass
Coolinarrig Lower	336	Upper Talbotstown	Baltinglass	Baltinglass
Coolinarrig Upper	186	Upper Talbotstown	Baltinglass	Baltinglass
Coolkenna	975	Shillelagh	Aghowle	Shillelagh
Coolmoney	95	Upper Talbotstown	Donaghmore	Baltinglass
Coolmore	148	Arklow	Ennereilly	Rathdrum
Coolnakilly	356	Newcastle	Glenealy	Rathdrum
Coolnaskeagh	125	Rathdown	Delgany	Rathdown
Coolroe	754	Shillelagh	Crosspatrick	Shillelagh
Coolross	264	Ballinacor South	Kilcommon	Shillelagh
Coolross	425	Shillelagh	Moyacomb	Shillelagh
Coonanstown	240	Upper Talbotstown	Rathsallagh	Baltinglass
Coonmore	158	Upper Talbotstown	Hollywood	Baltinglass
Copse	258	Ballinacor North	Rathdrum	Rathdrum
Corballis Lower	363	Ballinacor North	Rathdrum	Rathdrum
Corballis Upper	284	Ballinacor North	Rathdrum	Rathdrum
Cornagower East	194	Arklow	Dunganstown	Rathdrum
Cornagower West	196	Arklow	Dunganstown	Rathdrum
Cornan East	271	Upper Talbotstown	Kiltegan	Baltinglass
Cornan West	121	Upper Talbotstown	Kiltegan	Baltinglass
Corndog	136	Ballinacor South	Moyne	Shillelagh
Corporation Lands	358	Arklow	Kilpoole	Rathdrum
Corporation Murragh	67	Newcastle	Rathnew	Rathdrum
Corporationland 1st Div	3	Newcastle	Rathnew	Rathdrum
Corragh	1,579	Lower Talbotstown	Hollywood	Baltinglass
Corrasillagh	914	Ballinacor South	Ballinacor	Rathdrum
Corsilagh	115	Newcastle	Newcastle Upper	Rathdrum
Courtfoyle	201	Newcastle	Killiskey	Rathdrum
Cowpasture	229	Lower Talbotstown	Dunlavin	Baltinglass
Craffield	537	Ballinacor South	Ballykine	Rathdrum
Cranagh	112	Arklow	Dunganstown	Rathdrum
Cranareen	179	Upper Talbotstown	Kiltegan	Baltinglass
Crehelp	1,263	Lower Talbotstown	Crehelp	Baltinglass
Creowen	40	Newcastle	Newcastle Lower	Rathdrum
Crickawn	47	Lower Talbotstown	Donard	Baltinglass
Crissadaun	311	Upper Talbotstown	Donaghmore	Baltinglass
Cronakip	138	Arklow	Dunganstown	Rathdrum
Cronawinnia	238	Ballinacor South	Ballykine	Rathdrum
Cronclusk	131	Arklow	Arklow	Rathdrum
Crone	454	Rathdown	Powerscourt	Rathdown
Crone	189	Shillelagh	Aghowle	Shillelagh
Crone Beg	210	Ballinacor South	Ballykine	Rathdrum
Crone Lower	191	Arklow	Redcross	Rathdrum
Crone More	118	Ballinacor South	Ballykine	Rathdrum
Crone Upper	103	Arklow	Redcross	Rathdrum
Cronebane	155	Arklow	Castlemacadam	Rathdrum
Cronelea	470	Shillelagh	Mullinacuff	Shillelagh
Cronesallagh	197	Ballinacor South	Ballykine	Rathdrum
Cronroe	566	Newcastle	Rathnew	Rathdrum
Cronybyrne	244	Newcastle	Derrylossary	Rathdrum
Cronybyrne Demesne	152	Newcastle	Derrylossary	Rathdrum
Cronyhorn Lower	648	Shillelagh	Carnew	Shillelagh
Cronyhorn Upper	894	Shillelagh	Carnew	Shillelagh
Cronykeery	232	Newcastle	Rathnew	Rathdrum
Cross	329	Ballinacor South	Kilcommon	Shillelagh
Cross (or Valleymount)	187	Lower Talbotstown	Boystown	Baltinglass
Crosscoolharbour	826	Lower Talbotstown	Blessington	Naas
Crossnacole	312	Upper Talbotstown	Kiltegan	Baltinglass
Crossoge	241	Upper Talbotstown	Rathsallagh	Baltinglass
Cullen Lower	287	Arklow	Dunganstown	Rathdrum
Cullen Upper	269	Arklow	Dunganstown	Rathdrum
Cullenmore	54	Newcastle	Killiskey	Rathdrum
Cullentragh Big	933	Ballinacor North	Knockrath	Rathdrum
Cullentragh Little	304	Ballinacor North	Knockrath	Rathdrum
Cullentragh Park	537	Ballinacor North	Knockrath	Rathdrum
Cunniamstown Big	410	Arklow	Dunganstown	Rathdrum
Cunniamstown Little	90	Arklow	Dunganstown	Rathdrum
Curraghlawn	346	Ballinacor South	Kilpipe	Shillelagh
Curranstown Lower	221	Arklow	Arklow	Rathdrum
Curranstown Upper	209	Arklow	Arklow	Rathdrum
Curravanish	129	Ballinacor South	Kilcommon	Shillelagh
Curtlestown Lower	133	Rathdown	Powerscourt	Rathdown
Curtlestown Upper	198	Rathdown	Powerscourt	Rathdown
Danesfort Lower	160	Upper Talbotstown	Kiltegan	Baltinglass
Danesfort Upper	244	Upper Talbotstown	Kiltegan	Baltinglass
Davidstown	264	Upper Talbotstown	Donaghmore	Baltinglass
Decoy	209	Lower Talbotstown	Dunlavin	Baltinglass
Deerpark	333	Upper Talbotstown	Baltinglass	Baltinglass
Deerpark	198	Upper Talbotstown	Donaghmore	Baltinglass
Deerpark	118	Upper Talbotstown	Kiltegan	Baltinglass
Deerpark	341	Lower Talbotstown	Blessington	Naas
Deerpark	990	Rathdown	Powerscourt	Rathdown
Deerpark	505	Shillelagh	Carnew	Shillelagh
Delgany	259	Rathdown	Delgany	Rathdown
Derrybawn	1,711	Ballinacor North	Derrylossary	Rathdrum
Derrynamuck	278	Upper Talbotstown	Donaghmore	Baltinglass
Dillonsdown	159	Lower Talbotstown	Blessington	Naas
Donaghmore	236	Upper Talbotstown	Donaghmore	Baltinglass
**Donard**	Town	Lower Talbotstown	Donard	Baltinglass
Donard Demesne East	203	Lower Talbotstown	Donard	Baltinglass
Donard Demesne West	85	Lower Talbotstown	Donard	Baltinglass
Donard Lower	187	Lower Talbotstown	Donard	Baltinglass
Donard Mountain	85	Lower Talbotstown	Donard	Baltinglass
Donard Upper	102	Lower Talbotstown	Donard	Baltinglass
Doody's Bottoms	59	Lower Talbotstown	Donard	Baltinglass
Downings	127	Upper Talbotstown	Kilranelagh	Baltinglass
Downs	116	Newcastle	Kilcoole	Rathdrum
Downshill	839	Newcastle	Calary	Rathdrum
Dragoonhill	226	Lower Talbotstown	Hollywood	Baltinglass
Drim	272	Upper Talbotstown	Kiltegan	Baltinglass
Drumbawn	417	Newcastle	Calary	Rathdrum
Drumdangan	426	Newcastle	Kilcommon	Rathdrum
Drumgoff	1,016	Ballinacor South	Knockrath	Rathdrum
Drummin	3,889	Ballinacor North	Derrylossary	Rathdrum
Drummin	351	Shillelagh	Moyacomb	Shillelagh
Drummin	303	Ballinacor South	Preban	Shillelagh
Drummin East	261	Newcastle	Kilcoole	Rathdrum
Drummin West	51	Newcastle	Kilcoole	Rathdrum
Drumreagh	147	Upper Talbotstown	Donaghmore	Baltinglass
Drumreagh	251	Lower Talbotstown	Hollywood	Baltinglass
Dunboyke	187	Lower Talbotstown	Hollywood	Baltinglass
Dunbur Head	251	Arklow	Kilpoole	Rathdrum
Dunbur Lower	250	Arklow	Kilpoole	Rathdrum
Dunbur Upper	393	Arklow	Kilpoole	Rathdrum
Dunganstown East	287	Arklow	Dunganstown	Rathdrum
Dunganstown West	352	Arklow	Dunganstown	Rathdrum
**Dunlavin**	Town	Lower Talbotstown	Dunlavin	Baltinglass
Dunlavin Lower	392	Lower Talbotstown	Dunlavin	Baltinglass
Dunlavin Upper	452	Lower Talbotstown	Dunlavin	Baltinglass
Dunran Demsne	266	Newcastle	Killiskey	Rathdrum
Dunran Demsne	37	Newcastle	Newcastle Upper	Rathdrum
Dunranhill	267	Newcastle	Newcastle Upper	Rathdrum
Eadestown Hill	124	Upper Talbotstown	Donaghmore	Baltinglass
Eadestown Middle	248	Upper Talbotstown	Donaghmore	Baltinglass
Eadestown North	151	Upper Talbotstown	Donaghmore	Baltinglass
Eadestown South	175	Upper Talbotstown	Donaghmore	Baltinglass
Easthill	72	Newcastle	Newcastle Upper	Rathdrum
Ecawn	129	Arklow	Arklow	Rathdrum
Edmondstown	24	Lower Talbotstown	Blessington	Naas
Englishtown	282	Upper Talbotstown	Kilranelagh	Baltinglass
Ennereilly	132	Arklow	Ennereilly	Rathdrum
Ennisboyne	142	Arklow	Dunganstown	Rathdrum
**Enniskerry**	Town	Rathdown	Powerscourt	Rathdown
Enniskerry	5	Rathdown	Powerscourt	Rathdown
Fananierin	1,526	Ballinacor South	Ballinacor	Rathdrum
Farbreagra	441	Ballinacor South	Moyne	Shillelagh
Farnees	450	Ballinacor South	Kilcommon	Shillelagh
Farrankelly	126	Newcastle	Kilcoole	Rathdrum
Fassaroe	568	Rathdown	Kilmacanoge	Rathdown
Fauna	235	Upper Talbotstown	Donaghmore	Baltinglass
Ferrybank	190	Arklow	Kilbride	Rathdrum
Fiddan	191	Upper Talbotstown	Kiltegan	Baltinglass
Fiddancoyle	219	Upper Talbotstown	Kiltegan	Baltinglass
Forristeen	197	Lower Talbotstown	Dunlavin	Baltinglass
Fortgranite	121	Upper Talbotstown	Kilranelagh	Baltinglass
Freynestown Lower	186	Upper Talbotstown	Freynestown	Baltinglass
Freynestown Upper	223	Upper Talbotstown	Freynestown	Baltinglass
Freynestownhill	180	Upper Talbotstown	Freynestown	Baltinglass
Friarhill	229	Lower Talbotstown	Tober	Baltinglass
Friarshill	10	Newcastle	Rathnew	Rathdrum
Furzeditch East	95	Arklow	Dunganstown	Rathdrum
Furzeditch West	135	Arklow	Dunganstown	Rathdrum
Garnagowlan	222	Arklow	Castlemacadam	Rathdrum
Garryduff	300	Newcastle	Kilcommon	Rathdrum
Garryhoe	335	Ballinacor South	Kilcommon	Shillelagh
Garryknock	1,263	Lower Talbotstown	Boystown	Naas
Garrymore Lower	270	Ballinacor North	Rathdrum	Rathdrum
Garrymore Upper	177	Ballinacor North	Rathdrum	Rathdrum
Gibraltar	239	Upper Talbotstown	Rathbran	Baltinglass
Gibstown	313	Upper Talbotstown	Donaghmore	Baltinglass
Giltspur	206	Rathdown	Bray	Rathdown
Glashina	218	Lower Talbotstown	Burgage	Naas
Glaskenny	199	Rathdown	Powerscourt	Rathdown
Glasnamullen	1,828	Ballinacor North	Calary	Rathdrum
Glasnarget North	200	Newcastle	Kilcommon	Rathdrum
Glasnarget South	149	Arklow	Kilcommon	Rathdrum
Glebe	42	Lower Talbotstown	Hollywood	Baltinglass
Glebe	5	Rathdown	Kilmacanoge	Rathdown
Glebe	99	Ballinacor North	Derrylossary	Rathdrum
Glebe	7	Newcastle	Drumkay	Rathdrum
Glebe	63	Newcastle	Rathnew	Rathdrum
Glenart	258	Arklow	Arklow	Rathdrum
Glenbride	2,770	Lower Talbotstown	Boystown	Naas
Glencap Commons North	190	Rathdown	Kilmacanoge	Rathdown
Glencap Commons South	526	Rathdown	Kilmacanoge	Rathdown
Glencap Commons Upper	354	Rathdown	Kilmacanoge	Rathdown
Glencormick North	42	Rathdown	Kilmacanoge	Rathdown
Glencormick South	129	Rathdown	Kilmacanoge	Rathdown
Glendarragh	322	Newcastle	Newcastle Upper	Rathdrum
**Glenealy**	Town	Newcastle	Glenealy	Rathdrum
Glennacanon	269	Upper Talbotstown	Ballynure	Baltinglass
Glennashouk	423	Shillelagh	Carnew	Shillelagh
Glenphilipeen	235	Ballinacor South	Kilcommon	Shillelagh
Glenteige	203	Arklow	Kilbride	Rathdrum
Glenwood	252	Newcastle	Derrylossary	Rathdrum
Goldenfort	365	Upper Talbotstown	Rathbran	Baltinglass
Goldenhill	181	Lower Talbotstown	Kilbride	Naas
Gormanstown	212	Arklow	Dunganstown	Rathdrum
Gorteen	221	Shillelagh	Crosspatrick	Shillelagh
Gowle	597	Shillelagh	Crecrin	Shillelagh
Graigue	279	Upper Talbotstown	Kiltegan	Baltinglass
Granabeg Lower	270	Lower Talbotstown	Boystown	Baltinglass
Granabeg Upper	242	Lower Talbotstown	Boystown	Baltinglass
Granamore	1,735	Lower Talbotstown	Hollywood	Baltinglass
Grange North	295	Newcastle	Killiskey	Rathdrum
Grange South	266	Newcastle	Killiskey	Rathdrum
Grangecon Demesne	190	Upper Talbotstown	Ballynure	Baltinglass
Grangecon Hill	298	Upper Talbotstown	Ballynure	Baltinglass
Grangecon Lower	157	Upper Talbotstown	Ballynure	Baltinglass
Grangecon Parks	132	Upper Talbotstown	Ballynure	Baltinglass
Grangecon Rocks	159	Upper Talbotstown	Ballynure	Baltinglass
Grangecon Upper	173	Upper Talbotstown	Ballynure	Baltinglass
Greenan Beg	31	Ballinacor North	Knockrath	Rathdrum
Greenan More	344	Ballinacor North	Knockrath	Rathdrum
Greenhall	176	Shillelagh	Crosspatrick	Shillelagh
**Greystones**	Town	Rathdown	Delgany	Rathdown
Griffinstown Glen	111	Upper Talbotstown	Ballynure	Baltinglass
Griffinstown Hill	267	Upper Talbotstown	Ballynure	Baltinglass
Griffinstown Lower	203	Upper Talbotstown	Ballynure	Baltinglass
Griffinstown Upper	252	Upper Talbotstown	Ballynure	Baltinglass
Harristown	142	Lower Talbotstown	Hollywood	Baltinglass
Hartstown	217	Upper Talbotstown	Ballynure	Baltinglass
Hawkstown Lower	198	Arklow	Drumkay	Rathdrum
Hawkstown Upper	248	Arklow	Drumkay	Rathdrum
Haylands	142	Lower Talbotstown	Blessington	Naas
Hempstown	279	Lower Talbotstown	Blessington	Naas
Highpark Lower	213	Upper Talbotstown	Kiltegan	Baltinglass
Highpark Upper	203	Upper Talbotstown	Kiltegan	Baltinglass
Hillbrook Lower	566	Shillelagh	Carnew	Shillelagh
Hillbrook Upper	570	Shillelagh	Carnew	Shillelagh
Holdenstown Lower	214	Upper Talbotstown	Baltinglass	Baltinglass
Holdenstown Upper	240	Upper Talbotstown	Baltinglass	Baltinglass
Hollybrook	108	Rathdown	Kilmacanoge	Rathdown
Hollywood Demesne	198	Lower Talbotstown	Hollywood	Baltinglass
Hollywood Lower	123	Lower Talbotstown	Hollywood	Baltinglass
Hollywood Upper	93	Lower Talbotstown	Hollywood	Baltinglass
Holyvalley	59	Lower Talbotstown	Blessington	Naas
Holywell	23	Newcastle	Kilcoole	Rathdrum
Humewood	289	Upper Talbotstown	Kiltegan	Baltinglass
Humphrystown	664	Lower Talbotstown	Boystown	Naas
Inchanappa North	62	Newcastle	Killiskey	Rathdrum
Inchanappa South	183	Newcastle	Killiskey	Rathdrum
Intack	80	Lower Talbotstown	Donard	Baltinglass
Irishtown	105	Rathdown	Bray	Rathdown
Irishtown East	86	Lower Talbotstown	Donard	Baltinglass
Irishtown Park	95	Lower Talbotstown	Donard	Baltinglass
Irishtown West	66	Lower Talbotstown	Donard	Baltinglass
Irongrange Lower	181	Upper Talbotstown	Baltinglass	Baltinglass
Irongrange Upper	280	Upper Talbotstown	Baltinglass	Baltinglass
Island in Broad Lough	9	Newcastle	Rathnew	Rathdrum
Johnstown	435	Lower Talbotstown	Hollywood	Baltinglass
Johnstown	79	Newcastle	Kilcoole	Rathdrum
Johnstown Hill	216	Arklow	Inch	Rathdrum
Johnstown Lower	171	Arklow	Inch	Rathdrum
Johnstown North	212	Arklow	Kilbride	Rathdrum
Johnstown South	215	Arklow	Kilbride	Rathdrum
Johnstown Upper	146	Arklow	Inch	Rathdrum
Keadeen	361	Upper Talbotstown	Kilranelagh	Baltinglass
Keeloge	82	Arklow	Kilbride	Rathdrum
Keeloge Lower	146	Newcastle	Newcastle Upper	Rathdrum
Keeloge Upper	146	Newcastle	Newcastle Upper	Rathdrum
Keeloges	67	Arklow	Kilcommon	Rathdrum
Kellystown	128	Newcastle	Killiskey	Rathdrum
Kelsha	279	Upper Talbotstown	Kiltegan	Baltinglass
Kelshabeg	245	Upper Talbotstown	Kiltegan	Baltinglass
Kelshamore	330	Upper Talbotstown	Donaghmore	Baltinglass
Kennystown	201	Shillelagh	Carnew	Shillelagh
Kiernans Hill	152	Lower Talbotstown	Hollywood	Baltinglass
Kilballyowen	1,339	Ballinacor South	Preban	Shillelagh
Kilbaylet Lower	235	Lower Talbotstown	Donard	Baltinglass
Kilbaylet Upper	482	Lower Talbotstown	Donard	Baltinglass
Kilbeg	2,107	Lower Talbotstown	Boystown	Naas
Kilboy	96	Arklow	Dunganstown	Rathdrum
Kilbreffy	183	Upper Talbotstown	Donaghmore	Baltinglass
Kilbride	938	Lower Talbotstown	Kilbride	Naas
Kilbride	139	Rathdown	Bray	Rathdown
Kilbride	189	Arklow	Dunganstown	Rathdrum
Kilbride	317	Arklow	Kilbride	Rathdrum
Kilcandra	183	Arklow	Dunganstown	Rathdrum
Kilcandra	457	Arklow	Glenealy	Rathdrum
Kilcarney Lower	407	Ballinacor South	Hacketstown	Baltinglass
Kilcarney Upper	432	Ballinacor South	Hacketstown	Baltinglass
Kilcarra East	197	Arklow	Arklow	Rathdrum
Kilcarra West	480	Arklow	Arklow	Rathdrum
Kilcashel	336	Arklow	Castlemacadam	Rathdrum
Kilcavan Lower	423	Shillelagh	Carnew	Shillelagh
Kilcavan Upper	311	Shillelagh	Carnew	Shillelagh
Kilcoagh East	1,128	Lower Talbotstown	Donard	Baltinglass
Kilcoagh West	114	Lower Talbotstown	Donard	Baltinglass
**Kilcoole**	Town	Newcastle	Kilcoole	Rathdrum
Kilcoole	233	Newcastle	Kilcoole	Rathdrum
Kilcroney	218	Rathdown	Kilmacanoge	Rathdown
Kilday	234	Newcastle	Newcastle Upper	Rathdrum
Kilgarran	22	Rathdown	Powerscourt	Rathdown
Kill	215	Upper Talbotstown	Rathbran	Baltinglass
Killabeg	414	Shillelagh	Aghowle	Shillelagh
Killacloran	1,386	Ballinacor South	Kilpipe	Rathdrum
Killadreenan	579	Newcastle	Newcastle Lower	Rathdrum
Killaduff	582	Ballinacor South	Kilpipe	Shillelagh
Killahurler Lower	239	Arklow	Killahurler	Rathdrum
Killahurler Upper	185	Arklow	Killahurler	Rathdrum
Killalish Lower	306	Upper Talbotstown	Kilranelagh	Baltinglass
Killalish Upper	145	Upper Talbotstown	Kilranelagh	Baltinglass
Killamoat Lower	281	Upper Talbotstown	Kiltegan	Baltinglass
Killamoat Upper	224	Upper Talbotstown	Kiltegan	Baltinglass
Killarney	183	Rathdown	Bray	Rathdown
Killaveny	1,020	Ballinacor South	Kilpipe	Shillelagh
Killeagh	313	Ballinacor South	Ballykine	Rathdrum
Killeagh	206	Arklow	Kilbride	Rathdrum
Killegar	656	Rathdown	Powerscourt	Rathdown
Killerk	16	Lower Talbotstown	Hollywood	Baltinglass
Killickabawn	85	Newcastle	Kilcoole	Rathdrum
**Killincarrig**	Town	Rathdown	Delgany	Rathdown
Killincarrig	560	Rathdown	Delgany	Rathdown
Killiniskyduff	187	Arklow	Kilbride	Rathdrum
Killinpark	74	Newcastle	Kilcoole	Rathdrum
Killinure	1,767	Shillelagh	Aghowle	Shillelagh
Killiskey	104	Newcastle	Killiskey	Rathdrum
Killough Lower	128	Rathdown	Kilmacanoge	Rathdown
Killough Upper	230	Rathdown	Kilmacanoge	Rathdown
Killoughter	389	Newcastle	Rathnew	Rathdrum
Killybeg	388	Upper Talbotstown	Donaghmore	Baltinglass
Kilmacanoge North	152	Rathdown	Kilmacanoge	Rathdown
Kilmacanoge South	217	Rathdown	Kilmacanoge	Rathdown
Kilmacoo	372	Arklow	Castlemacadam	Rathdrum
Kilmacoo	154	Arklow	Redcross	Rathdrum
Kilmacoo Upper	279	Arklow	Castlemacadam	Rathdrum
Kilmacrea Lower	249	Arklow	Redcross	Rathdrum
Kilmacrea Upper	182	Arklow	Redcross	Rathdrum
Kilmacullagh	175	Newcastle	Newcastle Upper	Rathdrum
Kilmacurra East	137	Arklow	Dunganstown	Rathdrum
Kilmacurra West	111	Arklow	Dunganstown	Rathdrum
Kilmagig Lower	284	Arklow	Castlemacadam	Rathdrum
Kilmagig Upper	297	Arklow	Castlemacadam	Rathdrum
Kilmalin	375	Rathdown	Powerscourt	Rathdown
Kilmanoge	130	Arklow	Dunganstown	Rathdrum
Kilmartin	313	Newcastle	Killiskey	Rathdrum
Kilmullin	359	Newcastle	Derrylossary	Rathdrum
Kilmullin	348	Newcastle	Newcastle Lower	Rathdrum
Kilmurry	96	Upper Talbotstown	Baltinglass	Baltinglass
Kilmurry	339	Newcastle	Newcastle Upper	Rathdrum
Kilmurry Lower	326	Upper Talbotstown	Baltinglass	Baltinglass
Kilmurry Lower	172	Arklow	Arklow	Rathdrum
Kilmurry Middle	137	Arklow	Arklow	Rathdrum
Kilmurry North	319	Rathdown	Kilmacanoge	Rathdown
Kilmurry North	300	Arklow	Redcross	Rathdrum
Kilmurry South	368	Rathdown	Kilmacanoge	Rathdown
Kilmurry South	214	Arklow	Redcross	Rathdrum
Kilmurry Upper	125	Upper Talbotstown	Baltinglass	Baltinglass
Kilmurry Upper	124	Arklow	Arklow	Rathdrum
Kilnamanagh Beg	337	Arklow	Glenealy	Rathdrum
Kilnamanagh More	466	Arklow	Glenealy	Rathdrum
Kilpatrick	523	Arklow	Ennereilly	Rathdrum
Kilpedder East	125	Newcastle	Kilcoole	Rathdrum
Kilpedder West	33	Newcastle	Kilcoole	Rathdrum
Kilpipe	694	Ballinacor South	Kilpipe	Shillelagh
Kilpoole Hill	210	Arklow	Kilpoole	Rathdrum
Kilpoole Lower	226	Arklow	Kilpoole	Rathdrum
Kilpoole Upper	175	Arklow	Kilpoole	Rathdrum
Kilquade	350	Newcastle	Kilcoole	Rathdrum
Kilquade	46	Newcastle	Newcastle Lower	Rathdrum
Kilqueeny	147	Arklow	Castlemacadam	Rathdrum
Kilquiggin	364	Shillelagh	Mullinacuff	Shillelagh
Kilranelagh	221	Upper Talbotstown	Kilranelagh	Baltinglass
Kilruddery Deerpark	271	Rathdown	Bray	Rathdown
Kilruddery Deerpark	167	Rathdown	Delgany	Rathdown
Kilruddery Demesne East	71	Rathdown	Bray	Rathdown
Kilruddery Demesne West	348	Rathdown	Bray	Rathdown
**Kiltegan**	Town	Upper Talbotstown	Kiltegan	Baltinglass
Kiltegan	284	Upper Talbotstown	Kiltegan	Baltinglass
Kiltimon	297	Newcastle	Killiskey	Rathdrum
Kiltimon	5	Newcastle	Newcastle Upper	Rathdrum
Kindlestown Lower	177	Rathdown	Delgany	Rathdown
Kindlestown Upper	261	Rathdown	Delgany	Rathdown
Kingston	144	Arklow	Castlemacadam	Rathdrum
Kinsellastown	264	Lower Talbotstown	Crehelp	Baltinglass
Kippure	1,450	Lower Talbotstown	Kilbride	Naas
Kirikee	716	Ballinacor North	Knockrath	Rathdrum
Kish	78	Arklow	Arklow	Rathdrum
Knickeen	118	Upper Talbotstown	Donaghmore	Baltinglass
Knockaderry	405	Upper Talbotstown	Donaghmore	Baltinglass
Knockadosan	249	Ballinacor North	Rathdrum	Rathdrum
Knockadreet	296	Newcastle	Killiskey	Rathdrum
Knockadreet	276	Newcastle	Newcastle Upper	Rathdrum
Knockalt Lower	226	Lower Talbotstown	Boystown	Baltinglass
Knockalt Upper	162	Lower Talbotstown	Boystown	Baltinglass
Knockananna	267	Ballinacor South	Hacketstown	Shillelagh
Knockanarrigan	253	Upper Talbotstown	Donaghmore	Baltinglass
Knockandarragh	378	Upper Talbotstown	Donaghmore	Baltinglass
Knockandort	151	Lower Talbotstown	Dunlavin	Baltinglass
Knockanduff	102	Arklow	Castlemacadam	Rathdrum
Knockanode	247	Arklow	Castlemacadam	Rathdrum
Knockanooker Lower	235	Ballinacor South	Hacketstown	Shillelagh
Knockanooker Upper	338	Ballinacor South	Hacketstown	Shillelagh
Knockanrahan Lower	112	Arklow	Arklow	Rathdrum
Knockanrahan Upper	184	Arklow	Arklow	Rathdrum
Knockanreagh	221	Upper Talbotstown	Ballynure	Baltinglass
Knockanree	71	Arklow	Arklow	Rathdrum
Knockanree Lower	351	Arklow	Castlemacadam	Rathdrum
Knockanree Upper	456	Arklow	Castlemacadam	Rathdrum
Knockaphrumpa	320	Newcastle	Derrylossary	Rathdrum
Knockaquirk	42	Arklow	Drumkay	Rathdrum
Knockarigg	324	Upper Talbotstown	Ballynure	Baltinglass
Knockarigg Demesne	146	Upper Talbotstown	Ballynure	Baltinglass
Knockarigg Hill	156	Upper Talbotstown	Ballynure	Baltinglass
Knockatemple	449	Newcastle	Calary	Rathdrum
Knockatillane	579	Lower Talbotstown	Kilbride	Naas
Knockatomcoyle	1,132	Shillelagh	Mullinacuff	Shillelagh
Knockavurrig	187	Upper Talbotstown	Kiltegan	Baltinglass
Knockbane	103	Lower Talbotstown	Kilbride	Naas
Knockbawn	155	Upper Talbotstown	Freynestown	Baltinglass
Knockbawn	78	Rathdown	Powerscourt	Rathdown
Knockdoo	287	Upper Talbotstown	Ballynure	Baltinglass
Knockeen	700	Shillelagh	Liscolman	Shillelagh
Knockfadda	1,062	Newcastle	Newcastle Upper	Rathdrum
Knockieran Lower	290	Lower Talbotstown	Blessington	Naas
Knockieran Upper	192	Lower Talbotstown	Blessington	Naas
Knockloe	254	Shillelagh	Ardoyne	Shillelagh
Knockloe	434	Shillelagh	Liscolman	Shillelagh
Knockmiller	172	Arklow	Killahurler	Rathdrum
Knocknaboley	572	Lower Talbotstown	Hollywood	Baltinglass
Knocknaboley	715	Ballinacor South	Kilcommon	Shillelagh
Knocknadroose	3,084	Lower Talbotstown	Hollywood	Baltinglass
Knocknagilky Lower	160	Ballinacor South	Hacketstown	Baltinglass
Knocknagilky Upper	325	Ballinacor South	Hacketstown	Baltinglass
Knocknagree	119	Ballinacor South	Kiltegan	Baltinglass
Knocknagull	201	Lower Talbotstown	Dunlavin	Baltinglass
Knocknamohill	300	Arklow	Castlemacadam	Rathdrum
Knocknamuck Lower	184	Upper Talbotstown	Ballynure	Baltinglass
Knocknamuck Upper	146	Upper Talbotstown	Ballynure	Baltinglass
Knocknamunnion	314	Upper Talbotstown	Donaghmore	Baltinglass
Knocknashamroge	276	Ballinacor South	Hacketstown	Shillelagh
Knocknaskeagh	267	Ballinacor South	Hacketstown	Shillelagh
Knocknastreile	49	Lower Talbotstown	Hollywood	Baltinglass
Knockraheen	1,370	Newcastle	Calary	Rathdrum
Knockrath Big	976	Ballinacor North	Knockrath	Rathdrum
Knockrath Little	339	Ballinacor North	Knockrath	Rathdrum
Knockrobin	110	Newcastle	Rathnew	Rathdrum
Knockrobin Murragh	17	Newcastle	Rathnew	Rathdrum
Knockroe	96	Lower Talbotstown	Hollywood	Baltinglass
Knockroe	154	Newcastle	Kilcoole	Rathdrum
Knocksink	40	Rathdown	Powerscourt	Rathdown
Knoxtershill	138	Upper Talbotstown	Ballynure	Baltinglass
Kyle	401	Ballinacor South	Kilcommon	Shillelagh
Lackan	1,543	Lower Talbotstown	Boystown	Naas
Lackandarragh Lower	228	Rathdown	Powerscourt	Rathdown
Lackandarragh Upper	204	Rathdown	Powerscourt	Rathdown
Lackareagh	338	Upper Talbotstown	Ballynure	Baltinglass
Lamberton	126	Arklow	Arklow	Rathdrum
Laragh	473	Shillelagh	Mullinacuff	Shillelagh
Laragh East	2,202	Ballinacor North	Derrylossary	Rathdrum
Laragh West	3,291	Ballinacor North	Derrylossary	Rathdrum
Lathaleere	209	Upper Talbotstown	Baltinglass	Baltinglass
Leabeg Lower	182	Newcastle	Newcastle Lower	Rathdrum
Leabeg Middle	238	Newcastle	Newcastle Lower	Rathdrum
Leabeg Upper	193	Newcastle	Newcastle Lower	Rathdrum
Leamore Lower	195	Newcastle	Newcastle Lower	Rathdrum
Leamore Upper	349	Newcastle	Newcastle Lower	Rathdrum
Leitrim	355	Upper Talbotstown	Donaghmore	Baltinglass
Lemonstown	686	Lower Talbotstown	Crehelp	Baltinglass
Leoh	1,010	Upper Talbotstown	Donaghmore	Baltinglass
Levern	215	Upper Talbotstown	Donaghmore	Baltinglass
Lickeen	163	Ballinacor North	Knockrath	Rathdrum
Liscolman	947	Shillelagh	Liscolman	Shillelagh
Lisheens	373	Lower Talbotstown	Kilbride	Naas
Lobawn	411	Upper Talbotstown	Donaghmore	Baltinglass
Lockstown Lower	324	Lower Talbotstown	Hollywood	Baltinglass
Lockstown Upper	736	Lower Talbotstown	Hollywood	Baltinglass
Longhill Commons	7	Rathdown	Kilmacanoge	Rathdown
Lorrug	157	Lower Talbotstown	Dunlavin	Baltinglass
Loughmogue Lower	190	Lower Talbotstown	Dunlavin	Baltinglass
Loughmogue Upper	302	Lower Talbotstown	Dunlavin	Baltinglass
Lowtown	241	Upper Talbotstown	Ballynure	Baltinglass
Lugatryna	252	Lower Talbotstown	Dunlavin	Baltinglass
Lugduff	2,354	Ballinacor North	Derrylossary	Rathdrum
Lugduff	384	Ballinacor South	Kilcommon	Shillelagh
Lugglass Lower	241	Lower Talbotstown	Hollywood	Baltinglass
Lugglass Upper	240	Lower Talbotstown	Hollywood	Baltinglass
Lugnagroagh	227	Lower Talbotstown	Boystown	Naas
Lugnagun Great	518	Lower Talbotstown	Blessington	Naas
Lugnagun Little	120	Lower Talbotstown	Blessington	Naas
Lugnaquillia	874	Upper Talbotstown	Donaghmore	Baltinglass
Lumcloon	221	Shillelagh	Aghowle	Shillelagh
Lybagh	381	Ballinacor South	Kiltegan	Baltinglass
Macreddin East	441	Ballinacor South	Ballykine	Rathdrum
Macreddin West	186	Ballinacor South	Ballykine	Rathdrum
Maghera Beg	173	Arklow	Dunganstown	Rathdrum
Maghera More	506	Arklow	Dunganstown	Rathdrum
Mangans	386	Ballinacor South	Kilcommon	Shillelagh
Manger	221	Upper Talbotstown	Rathbran	Baltinglass
Manofwar	99	Lower Talbotstown	Tober	Baltinglass
Marsh	199	Arklow	Kilbride	Rathdrum
Mattymount	130	Upper Talbotstown	Rathbran	Baltinglass
Meetings	343	Ballinacor North	Rathdrum	Rathdrum
Merepark	81	Newcastle	Newcastle Upper	Rathdrum
Merginstown	163	Lower Talbotstown	Dunlavin	Baltinglass
Merginstown Demesne	198	Lower Talbotstown	Dunlavin	Baltinglass
Merginstown Glen	303	Lower Talbotstown	Dunlavin	Baltinglass
Merrymeeting	175	Newcastle	Rathnew	Rathdrum
Mill Land	117	Ballinacor South	Crosspatrick	Shillelagh
Milltown	257	Lower Talbotstown	Dunlavin	Baltinglass
Milltown North	308	Newcastle	Rathnew	Rathdrum
Milltown South	68	Newcastle	Rathnew	Rathdrum
Minmore	19	Shillelagh	Aghowle	Shillelagh
Minmore	30	Shillelagh	Carnew	Shillelagh
Minmore	229	Shillelagh	Moyacomb	Shillelagh
Moanaspick	282	Lower Talbotstown	Kilbride	Naas
Moanvawn	237	Upper Talbotstown	Freynestown	Baltinglass
Monaglogh	297	Arklow	Killahurler	Rathdrum
Monalin	152	Newcastle	Newcastle Upper	Rathdrum
Monamuck	446	Lower Talbotstown	Boystown	Baltinglass
Monastery	327	Rathdown	Powerscourt	Rathdown
Monatore	209	Upper Talbotstown	Ballynure	Baltinglass
Monduff	169	Newcastle	Rathnew	Rathdrum
Money Big	208	Arklow	Arklow	Rathdrum
Money Little	97	Arklow	Arklow	Rathdrum
Money Lower	485	Shillelagh	Aghowle	Shillelagh
Money Upper	953	Shillelagh	Aghowle	Shillelagh
Moneycarroll	79	Newcastle	Newcastle Upper	Rathdrum
Moneylane	98	Arklow	Arklow	Rathdrum
Moneymeen	517	Ballinacor South	Ballinacor	Rathdrum
Moneymore	404	Upper Talbotstown	Ballynure	Baltinglass
Moneystown Hill	364	Newcastle	Derrylossary	Rathdrum
Moneystown North	375	Newcastle	Derrylossary	Rathdrum
Moneystown South	176	Newcastle	Derrylossary	Rathdrum
Moneyteige Middle	297	Arklow	Ballintemple	Rathdrum
Moneyteige North	260	Arklow	Ballintemple	Rathdrum
Moneyteige South	328	Arklow	Ballintemple	Rathdrum
Mongan	258	Arklow	Arklow	Rathdrum
Mongnacool Lower	317	Ballinacor South	Ballykine	Rathdrum
Mongnacool Upper	223	Ballinacor South	Ballykine	Rathdrum
Mooreshill	335	Arklow	Killahurler	Rathdrum
Moorspark	85	Upper Talbotstown	Donaghmore	Baltinglass
Moorstown	147	Upper Talbotstown	Donaghmore	Baltinglass
Moorstown	119	Newcastle	Killiskey	Rathdrum
Mount Kennedy Demesne	39	Newcastle	Kilcoole	Rathdrum
Mount Kennedy Demesne	412	Newcastle	Newcastle Upper	Rathdrum
Mountjohn	82	Newcastle	Newcastle Upper	Rathdrum
Mountlusk	105	Arklow	Kilcommon	Rathdrum
Mountpleasant	202	Shillelagh	Crosspatrick	Shillelagh
Mountusher	109	Newcastle	Rathnew	Rathdrum
Moylisha	628	Shillelagh	Moyacomb	Shillelagh
Moyne	351	Ballinacor South	Moyne	Shillelagh
Moyntiagh	284	Newcastle	Derrylossary	Rathdrum
Muckduff Lower	368	Upper Talbotstown	Kiltegan	Baltinglass
Muckduff Upper	483	Upper Talbotstown	Kiltegan	Baltinglass
Mucklagh	784	Ballinacor South	Ballinacor	Rathdrum
Mucklagh	500	Ballinacor South	Kilpipe	Shillelagh
Mullanacranna	239	Upper Talbotstown	Kiltegan	Baltinglass
Mullannaskeagh	263	Ballinacor South	Kilcommon	Shillelagh
Mullans	7	Upper Talbotstown	Rathsallagh	Baltinglass
Mullans North	548	Ballinacor South	Kilcommon	Shillelagh
Mullans South	536	Ballinacor South	Kilcommon	Shillelagh
Mullinaveige.	705	Ballinacor North	Calary	Rathdrum
Mullycagh Lower	341	Lower Talbotstown	Hollywood	Baltinglass
Mullycagh Upper	394	Lower Talbotstown	Hollywood	Baltinglass
Mungacullin	450	Shillelagh	Aghowle	Shillelagh
Muskeagh	557	Ballinacor South	Kilcommon	Shillelagh
Newbawn	419	Arklow	Dunganstown	Rathdrum
**Newcastle**	Town	Newcastle	Newcastle Lower	Rathdrum
Newcastle Lower	189	Newcastle	Newcastle Lower	Rathdrum
Newcastle Middle	295	Newcastle	Newcastle Lower	Rathdrum
Newcastle Upper	351	Newcastle	Newcastle Lower	Rathdrum
Newcourt	369	Rathdown	Bray	Rathdown
Newpaddocks	77	Lower Talbotstown	Blessington	Naas
Newpark	211	Upper Talbotstown	Donaghmore	Baltinglass
Newrath	267	Newcastle	Rathnew	Rathdrum
Newry	1,274	Shillelagh	Moyacomb	Shillelagh
Newtown	130	Upper Talbotstown	Donaghmore	Baltinglass
Newtown	393	Lower Talbotstown	Hollywood	Baltinglass
Newtown	127	Upper Talbotstown	Kilranelagh	Baltinglass
Newtown	150	Rathdown	Kilmacanoge	Rathdown
Newtown	106	Arklow	Drumkay	Rathdrum
Newtown	393	Shillelagh	Mullinacuff	Shillelagh
**Newtown Mountkennedy**	Town	Newcastle	Newcastle Upper	Rathdrum
**Newtown Vevay**	Town	Rathdown	Bray	Rathdown
Newtownboswell	166	Newcastle	Killiskey	Rathdrum
Newtownmountkennedy	103	Newcastle	Newcastle Upper	Rathdrum
Newtownsaunders	356	Upper Talbotstown	Baltinglass	Baltinglass
Oakwood	1,721	Lower Talbotstown	Hollywood	Baltinglass
Oghil Lower	387	Arklow	Redcross	Rathdrum
Oghil Upper	219	Arklow	Redcross	Rathdrum
Oldboleys	1,165	Rathdown	Powerscourt	Rathdown
Oldcourt	244	Upper Talbotstown	Rathsallagh	Baltinglass
Oldcourt	873	Lower Talbotstown	Blessington	Naas
Oldcourt	316	Rathdown	Bray	Rathdown
Oldpaddocks	41	Lower Talbotstown	Blessington	Naas
Oldtown	214	Upper Talbotstown	Ballynure	Baltinglass
Onagh	188	Rathdown	Powerscourt	Rathdown
Paddock	31	Rathdown	Delgany	Rathdown
Park	229	Arklow	Arklow	Rathdrum
Park	469	Shillelagh	Moyacomb	Shillelagh
Parkmore	662	Newcastle	Derrylossary	Rathdrum
Parkmore	150	Shillelagh	Carnew	Shillelagh
Parkmore	143	Shillelagh	Carnew	Shillelagh
Parknashaw	164	Arklow	Castlemacadam	Rathdrum
Parknasilloge	122	Rathdown	Powerscourt	Rathdown
Parkroe	532	Newcastle	Derrylossary	Rathdrum
Paulbeg	372	Shillelagh	Carnew	Shillelagh
Pinnacle	95	Upper Talbotstown	Baltinglass	Baltinglass
Plezica	211	Lower Talbotstown	Dunlavin	Baltinglass
Pollaghadoo	475	Upper Talbotstown	Donaghmore	Baltinglass
Pollahoney	366	Arklow	Arklow	Rathdrum
Pollaphuca	117	Arklow	Castlemacadam	Rathdrum
Powerscourt Demesne	811	Rathdown	Powerscourt	Rathdown
Powerscourt Mountain	7,590	Rathdown	Powerscourt	Rathdown
Powerscourt Paddock	1,017	Rathdown	Calary	Rathdown
Preban	277	Ballinacor South	Preban	Shillelagh
Priestsnewtown	347	Newcastle	Kilcoole	Rathdrum
Prospect Lower	122	Newcastle	Newcastle Upper	Rathdrum
Prospect Upper	52	Newcastle	Newcastle Upper	Rathdrum
Quigginroe	193	Shillelagh	Aghowle	Shillelagh
Rahaval	137	Arklow	Redcross	Rathdrum
Raheen	172	Upper Talbotstown	Donaghmore	Baltinglass
Raheen	350	Upper Talbotstown	Rathbran	Baltinglass
Raheen	334	Ballinacor North	Derrylossary	Rathdrum
Raheen	57	Arklow	Kilbride	Rathdrum
Raheenakit	205	Shillelagh	Aghowle	Shillelagh
Raheenavine	135	Arklow	Castlemacadam	Rathdrum
Raheenglass	178	Shillelagh	Crosspatrick	Shillelagh
Raheengraney	655	Shillelagh	Moyacomb	Shillelagh
Raheenleagh	426	Arklow	Killahurler	Rathdrum
Raheenmore	27	Arklow	Drumkay	Rathdrum
Raheenteige	277	Ballinacor South	Kilcommon	Shillelagh
Raherd	29	Arklow	Dunganstown	Rathdrum
Raherd	95	Arklow	Ennereilly	Rathdrum
Rampere	345	Upper Talbotstown	Rathbran	Baltinglass
Randalstown	233	Upper Talbotstown	Donaghmore	Baltinglass
Rath	283	Shillelagh	Ardoyne	Shillelagh
Rath East	399	Shillelagh	Liscolman	Shillelagh
Rathattin	431	Lower Talbotstown	Hollywood	Baltinglass
Rathballylong	187	Lower Talbotstown	Boystown	Naas
Rathbane	336	Ballinacor South	Hacketstown	Shillelagh
Rathbawn	111	Lower Talbotstown	Dunlavin	Baltinglass
Rathbran	378	Upper Talbotstown	Rathbran	Baltinglass
Rathcot	138	Ballinacor South	Hacketstown	Shillelagh
Rathcoyle Lower	359	Ballinacor South	Kiltegan	Baltinglass
Rathcoyle Upper	272	Ballinacor South	Kiltegan	Baltinglass
Rathdangan	298	Upper Talbotstown	Kiltegan	Baltinglass
Rathdown Lower	378	Rathdown	Delgany	Rathdown
Rathdown Upper	497	Rathdown	Delgany	Rathdown
**Rathdrum**	Town	Ballinacor North	Rathdrum	Rathdrum
Rathdrum	291	Ballinacor North	Rathdrum	Rathdrum
Rathduffbeg	314	Upper Talbotstown	Kiltegan	Baltinglass
Rathduffmore	291	Ballinacor South	Hacketstown	Shillelagh
Rathgorragh Lower	428	Upper Talbotstown	Kiltegan	Baltinglass
Rathgorragh Upper	241	Upper Talbotstown	Kiltegan	Baltinglass
Rathmeague	163	Ballinacor South	Hacketstown	Shillelagh
Rathmoon	281	Upper Talbotstown	Baltinglass	Baltinglass
Rathmore	194	Newcastle	Killiskey	Rathdrum
Rathnabo	121	Lower Talbotstown	Blessington	Naas
**Rathnew**	Town	Newcastle	Rathnew	Rathdrum
Rathsallagh	246	Upper Talbotstown	Rathsallagh	Baltinglass
Rathsallagh Demesne	248	Upper Talbotstown	Rathsallagh	Baltinglass
Rathshanmore East	295	Ballinacor South	Hacketstown	Shillelagh
Rathshanmore South	225	Ballinacor South	Hacketstown	Shillelagh
Rathshanmore West	184	Ballinacor South	Hacketstown	Shillelagh
Rathtoole	425	Upper Talbotstown	Rathtoole	Baltinglass
**Redcross**	Town	Arklow	Redcross	Rathdrum
Redcross	344	Arklow	Redcross	Rathdrum
Rock Big	251	Arklow	Arklow	Rathdrum
Rock Little	138	Arklow	Arklow	Rathdrum
Rockbog	88	Arklow	Arklow	Rathdrum
Rockstown Lower	114	Arklow	Castlemacadam	Rathdrum
Rockstown Upper	258	Arklow	Castlemacadam	Rathdrum
Roddenagh	846	Ballinacor South	Kilpipe	Shillelagh
Rosahane	488	Ballinacor South	Ballinacor	Rathdrum
Rosbane	496	Ballinacor South	Kilcommon	Shillelagh
Roscath	226	Arklow	Dunganstown	Rathdrum
Rosnastraw	710	Ballinacor South	Kilpipe	Shillelagh
Rossana Lower	130	Newcastle	Rathnew	Rathdrum
Rossana Upper	80	Newcastle	Rathnew	Rathdrum
Rostyduff Lower	271	Upper Talbotstown	Donaghmore	Baltinglass
Rostyduff Upper	306	Upper Talbotstown	Donaghmore	Baltinglass
Rostygah	265	Arklow	Arklow	Rathdrum
Rottenhill	243	Upper Talbotstown	Rathsallagh	Baltinglass
Roundwood	1,208	Ballinacor North	Derrylossary	Rathdrum
Russborough	431	Lower Talbotstown	Burgage	Naas
Russellstown	233	Lower Talbotstown	Burgage	Naas
Sallymount	384	Arklow	Ennereilly	Rathdrum
Sandyhills	229	Lower Talbotstown	Tober	Baltinglass
Santryhill	36	Lower Talbotstown	Blessington	Naas
Saundersgrove	205	Upper Talbotstown	Rathbran	Baltinglass
Saundersgrove Hill	189	Upper Talbotstown	Rathbran	Baltinglass
Scalp	350	Lower Talbotstown	Hollywood	Baltinglass
Scratenagh	153	Arklow	Ennereilly	Rathdrum
Scurlocksleap	630	Lower Talbotstown	Kilbride	Naas
Scurlogue	153	Upper Talbotstown	Rathbran	Baltinglass
Seabank	265	Arklow	Kilbride	Rathdrum
Seasonpark	116	Newcastle	Newcastle Upper	Rathdrum
Seaview	55	Newcastle	Kilcoole	Rathdrum
Seskin	255	Upper Talbotstown	Donaghmore	Baltinglass
Seskin	355	Shillelagh	Mullinacuff	Shillelagh
Sevenchurches (or Camaderry)	4,518	Ballinacor North	Derrylossary	Rathdrum
Shankill	1,338	Lower Talbotstown	Kilbride	Naas
Sheeana More	590	Ballinacor South	Ballykine	Rathdrum
Sheeanabeg (Robeck)	121	Ballinacor South	Ballykine	Rathdrum
Sheeanabeg (Whaley)	127	Ballinacor South	Ballykine	Rathdrum
Sheephouse	82	Arklow	Arklow	Rathdrum
Sheepwalk	165	Arklow	Kilbride	Rathdrum
Sheilstown	639	Ballinacor South	Moyne	Shillelagh
Shelton	202	Arklow	Kilbride	Rathdrum
Shelton Abbey	728	Arklow	Kilbride	Rathdrum
Shepherdshill	199	Upper Talbotstown	Freynestown	Baltinglass
**Shillelagh**	Town	Shillelagh	Carnew	Shillelagh
Slaneypark	90	Upper Talbotstown	Baltinglass	Baltinglass
Slate	130	Newcastle	Newcastle Lower	Rathdrum
Sleamaine (or Ballinvalla)	540	Ballinacor North	Calary	Rathdrum
Sleanaglogh	440	Newcastle	Derrylossary	Rathdrum
Slieveboy Lower	321	Ballinacor South	Kiltegan	Baltinglass
Slieveboy Upper	204	Ballinacor South	Kiltegan	Baltinglass
Slievecorragh	773	Lower Talbotstown	Hollywood	Baltinglass
Slieveduff	263	Arklow	Inch	Rathdrum
Slievefoore	412	Arklow	Killahurler	Rathdrum
Slievemaan	571	Ballinacor South	Kiltegan	Baltinglass
Slievemweel	576	Ballinacor South	Moyne	Shillelagh
Slievenamough	354	Ballinacor South	Kiltegan	Baltinglass
Slievenamough Plain	178	Ballinacor South	Kiltegan	Baltinglass
Slievenavode	82	Arklow	Castlemacadam	Rathdrum
Slievereagh Lower	266	Upper Talbotstown	Kiltegan	Baltinglass
Slievereagh Upper	259	Upper Talbotstown	Kiltegan	Baltinglass
Slieveroe	194	Arklow	Kilcommon	Rathdrum
Slieveroe	513	Ballinacor South	Moyne	Shillelagh
Snugborough	271	Upper Talbotstown	Donaghmore	Baltinglass
Snugborough	147	Arklow	Kilbride	Rathdrum
Spinans East	180	Upper Talbotstown	Donaghmore	Baltinglass
Spinans Hill	130	Upper Talbotstown	Donaghmore	Baltinglass
Spinans Middle	194	Upper Talbotstown	Donaghmore	Baltinglass
Spinans West	76	Upper Talbotstown	Donaghmore	Baltinglass
Springfarm	239	Arklow	Redcross	Rathdrum
Springfield	20	Rathdown	Bray	Rathdown
Springfield	143	Arklow	Arklow	Rathdrum
Sraghmore	1,074	Ballinacor North	Calary	Rathdrum
Sroughan	497	Lower Talbotstown	Boystown	Naas
Sroughmore	376	Arklow	Castlemacadam	Rathdrum
Sruhaun	190	Upper Talbotstown	Baltinglass	Baltinglass
Stilebawn	183	Rathdown	Kilmacanoge	Rathdown
Stilebawn	159	Newcastle	Kilcoole	Rathdrum
Stoops	208	Shillelagh	Carnew	Shillelagh
Stranahely	375	Upper Talbotstown	Donaghmore	Baltinglass
Stranakelly	591	Shillelagh	Mullinacuff	Shillelagh
**Stratford**	Town	Upper Talbotstown	Rathbran	Baltinglass
Stratford	341	Upper Talbotstown	Rathbran	Baltinglass
Stratfordlodge	277	Upper Talbotstown	Baltinglass	Baltinglass
Studfield North	132	Lower Talbotstown	Donard	Baltinglass
Studfield South	35	Lower Talbotstown	Donard	Baltinglass
Stump of the Castle	804	Newcastle	Kilcommon	Rathdrum
Sugarloaf	163	Upper Talbotstown	Donaghmore	Baltinglass
Table Mountain	508	Upper Talbotstown	Donaghmore	Baltinglass
Talbotstown Lower	258	Upper Talbotstown	Kilranelagh	Baltinglass
Talbotstown Upper	318	Upper Talbotstown	Kilranelagh	Baltinglass
Tanseyclose	159	Ballinacor North	Rathdrum	Rathdrum
Templecarrig Lower	256	Rathdown	Delgany	Rathdown
Templecarrig Upper	103	Rathdown	Delgany	Rathdown
Templelusk	351	Arklow	Castlemacadam	Rathdrum
Templelyon Lower	220	Arklow	Redcross	Rathdrum
Templelyon Upper	163	Arklow	Redcross	Rathdrum
Templemichael	174	Arklow	Kilbride	Rathdrum
Templerainy	242	Arklow	Kilbride	Rathdrum
Thomastown	299	Arklow	Arklow	Rathdrum
Threecastles	669	Lower Talbotstown	Blessington	Naas
Threemilewater	171	Arklow	Dunganstown	Rathdrum
Threewells	861	Ballinacor South	Ballykine	Rathdrum
Ticlash	148	Arklow	Kilcommon	Rathdrum
Tiglin	472	Newcastle	Killiskey	Rathdrum
Tiglin	122	Newcastle	Killiskey	Rathdrum
Tiglin	151	Newcastle	Newcastle Lower	Rathdrum
Tigroney East	320	Arklow	Castlemacadam	Rathdrum
Tigroney West	376	Arklow	Castlemacadam	Rathdrum
Tiknock	168	Arklow	Kilbride	Rathdrum
Timullin	127	Arklow	Kilcommon	Rathdrum
Tinahask Lower	117	Arklow	Arklow	Rathdrum
Tinahask Upper	138	Arklow	Arklow	Rathdrum
Tinahely	216	Ballinacor South	Kilcommon	Shillelagh
**Tinahely Town**	Town	Ballinacor South	Kilcommon	Shillelagh
Tinakelly	233	Newcastle	Rathnew	Rathdrum
Tinakelly Murragh	67	Newcastle	Rathnew	Rathdrum
Tinmore	299	Newcastle	Newcastle Upper	Rathdrum
Tinnahinch	111	Arklow	Castlemacadam	Rathdrum
Tinnakilly Lower	362	Ballinacor South	Ballykine	Rathdrum
Tinnakilly Upper	586	Ballinacor South	Ballykine	Rathdrum
Tinnapark Demesne	309	Newcastle	Kilcoole	Rathdrum
Tinnehinch	66	Upper Talbotstown	Donaghmore	Baltinglass
Tinnehinch	25	Rathdown	Kilmacanoge	Rathdown
Tinnehinch	49	Rathdown	Powerscourt	Rathdown
Tinode	1,250	Lower Talbotstown	Kilbride	Naas
Tinoranhill North	246	Upper Talbotstown	Ballynure	Baltinglass
Tinoranhill South	258	Upper Talbotstown	Ballynure	Baltinglass
Tithewer	687	Newcastle	Calary	Rathdrum
Tober Demesne	260	Lower Talbotstown	Tober	Baltinglass
Tober Lower	133	Lower Talbotstown	Tober	Baltinglass
Tober Upper	305	Lower Talbotstown	Tober	Baltinglass
Toberaviller	107	Arklow	Drumkay	Rathdrum
Toberbeg	251	Lower Talbotstown	Dunlavin	Baltinglass
Toberlownagh	917	Ballinacor South	Kilpipe	Shillelagh
Toberpatrick	744	Ballinacor South	Kilpipe	Shillelagh
Togher	648	Lower Talbotstown	Boystown	Baltinglass
Togher	65	Arklow	Dunganstown	Rathdrum
Togher Beg	91	Ballinacor North	Derrylossary	Rathdrum
Togher More	222	Ballinacor North	Derrylossary	Rathdrum
Tomacork	894	Shillelagh	Carnew	Shillelagh
Tomanierin Lower	138	Ballinacor South	Kilpipe	Rathdrum
Tomanierin Upper	149	Ballinacor South	Kilpipe	Rathdrum
Tombreen	1,184	Shillelagh	Carnew	Shillelagh
Tomcoyle	464	Ballinacor South	Preban	Shillelagh
Tomcoyle Lower	204	Newcastle	Killiskey	Rathdrum
Tomcoyle Upper	128	Newcastle	Killiskey	Rathdrum
Tomdarragh	661	Ballinacor North	Derrylossary	Rathdrum
Tomnafinnoge	537	Shillelagh	Carnew	Shillelagh
Tomnaskela	339	Ballinacor South	Kilpipe	Shillelagh
Tomriland	1,321	Ballinacor North	Derrylossary	Rathdrum
Tonlegee	112	Arklow	Dunganstown	Rathdrum
Tonygarrow	685	Rathdown	Powerscourt	Rathdown
Toolestown	214	Upper Talbotstown	Freynestown	Baltinglass
Tooman	101	Newcastle	Kilcoole	Rathdrum
Toor	1,012	Lower Talbotstown	Hollywood	Baltinglass
Toorboy	467	Ballinacor South	Kiltegan	Baltinglass
Tornant Lower	274	Lower Talbotstown	Dunlavin	Baltinglass
Tornant Upper	366	Lower Talbotstown	Dunlavin	Baltinglass
Trooperstown	1,531	Ballinacor North	Knockrath	Rathdrum
Trudder	240	Newcastle	Newcastle Upper	Rathdrum
Tuckmill Hill	226	Upper Talbotstown	Rathbran	Baltinglass
Tuckmill Lower	278	Upper Talbotstown	Rathbran	Baltinglass
Tuckmill Upper	390	Upper Talbotstown	Rathbran	Baltinglass
Tulfarris	449	Lower Talbotstown	Boystown	Naas
Tullowclay	290	Shillelagh	Ardoyne	Shillelagh
Tullylusk	183	Arklow	Dunganstown	Rathdrum
Umrygar	573	Shillelagh	Carnew	Shillelagh
Uppertown	229	Lower Talbotstown	Dunlavin	Baltinglass
Valleymount (or Cross)	187	Lower Talbotstown	Boystown	Baltinglass
Walterstown	139	Lower Talbotstown	Hollywood	Baltinglass
Wards of Tober	165	Lower Talbotstown	Tober	Baltinglass
Westaston Demesne	206	Arklow	Dunganstown	Rathdrum
Westaston Hill	147	Arklow	Dunganstown	Rathdrum
Whitefield	130	Ballinacor South	Kilcommon	Shillelagh
Whitehills	154	Upper Talbotstown	Ballynure	Baltinglass
Whiterock	419	Ballinacor South	Kilcommon	Shillelagh
Whitestown Lower	426	Upper Talbotstown	Donaghmore	Baltinglass
Whitestown Upper	308	Upper Talbotstown	Donaghmore	Baltinglass
**Wicklow**	Town	Arklow	Drumkay	Rathdrum
**Wicklow**	Town	Arklow	Kilpoole	Rathdrum
**Wicklow**	Town	Newcastle	Rathnew	Rathdrum
Wicklow	22	Newcastle	Rathnew	Rathdrum
Windgate	122	Rathdown	Delgany	Rathdown
Winetavern	421	Upper Talbotstown	Rathbran	Baltinglass
Wingfield	115	Rathdown	Kilmacanoge	Rathdrum
Woodenboley	390	Lower Talbotstown	Hollywood	Baltinglass
Woodfield	280	Upper Talbotstown	Baltinglass	Baltinglass
Woodfieldglen	185	Upper Talbotstown	Baltinglass	Baltinglass
Woodlands	229	Newcastle	Kilcoole	Rathdrum
Woodstock Demesne	213	Newcastle	Newcastle Lower	Rathdrum
Yardland	90	Arklow	Arklow	Rathdrum

== See also ==
- List of Baronies and Civil Parishes of County Wicklow
- List of baronies of Ireland
- List of civil parishes of Ireland
