= List of baronies and civil parishes of County Wicklow =

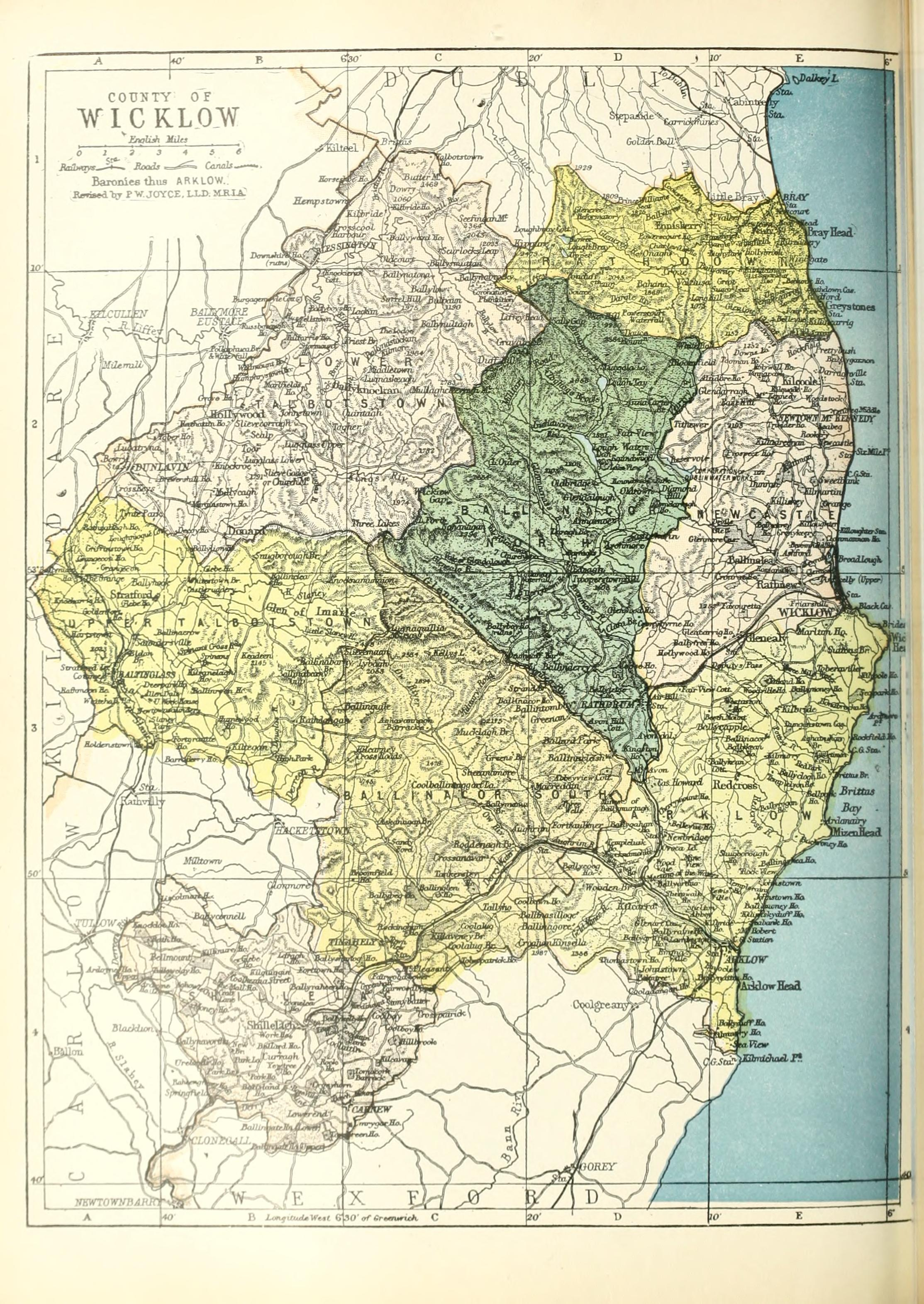
Map of the baronies of County Wicklow

The historic divisions of County Wicklow consist of the six Baronies of Arklow, Ballinacor North, Ballinacor South, Talbotstown Lower, Talbotstown Upper, Newcastle, Rathdown and Shillelagh. The six baronies contain the following civil parishes:

Barony	Civil Parish
Arklow	Arklow
Arklow	Ballintemple
Arklow	Castlemacadam
Arklow	Drumkay
Arklow	Dunganstown
Arklow	Ennereilly
Arklow	Glenealy
Arklow	Inch
Arklow	Kilbride
Arklow	Kilcommon
Arklow	Killahurler
Arklow	Kilpoole
Arklow	Redcross
Ballinacor North	Calary
Ballinacor North	Derrylossary
Ballinacor North	Knockrath
Ballinacor North	Rathdrum
Ballinacor South	Ballinacor
Ballinacor South	Ballykine
Ballinacor South	Crosspatrick
Ballinacor South	Hacketstown
Ballinacor South	Kilcommon
Ballinacor South	Kilpipe
Ballinacor South	Kiltegan
Ballinacor South	Knockrath
Ballinacor South	Moyne
Ballinacor South	Preban
Newcastle	Calary
Newcastle	Derrylossary
Newcastle	Drumkay
Newcastle	Glenealy
Newcastle	Kilcommon
Newcastle	Kilcoole
Newcastle	Killiskey
Newcastle	Newcastle Lower
Newcastle	Newcastle Upper
Newcastle	Rathnew
Rathdown	Bray
Rathdown	Calary
Rathdown	Delgany
Rathdown	Kilmacanoge
Rathdown	Powerscourt
Shillelagh	Aghowle
Shillelagh	Ardoyne
Shillelagh	Carnew
Shillelagh	Crecrin
Shillelagh	Crosspatrick
Shillelagh	Liscolman
Shillelagh	Moyacomb
Shillelagh	Mullinacuff
Talbotstown Lower	Blessington
Talbotstown Lower	Boystown
Talbotstown Lower	Burgage
Talbotstown Lower	Crehelp
Talbotstown Lower	Donard
Talbotstown Lower	Dunlavin
Talbotstown Lower	Hollywood
Talbotstown Lower	Kilbride
Talbotstown Lower	Tober
Talbotstown Upper	Ballynure
Talbotstown Upper	Baltinglass
Talbotstown Upper	Donaghmore
Talbotstown Upper	Donard
Talbotstown Upper	Dunlavin
Talbotstown Upper	Freynestown
Talbotstown Upper	Hollywood
Talbotstown Upper	Kilranelagh
Talbotstown Upper	Kiltegan
Talbotstown Upper	Rathbran
Talbotstown Upper	Rathsallagh
Talbotstown Upper	Rathtoole

== See also ==
- List of townlands of County Wicklow
- List of baronies of Ireland
- List of civil parishes of Ireland
