= Kilbride =

Kilbride (derived from 'Church of St. Brigid' in Gaelic languages) may refer to:

== Places ==
=== Canada ===
- Kilbride, St. John's, Newfoundland and Labrador, a neighbourhood
- Kilbride (electoral district), for the House of Assembly of Newfoundland and Labrador
- Kilbride, Ontario, community near Burlington
- Castle Kilbride, historic house in Baden, Ontario

=== Ireland ===
- Kilbride, County Antrim, village in County Antrim, Northern Ireland
- Kilbride, County Cavan, townland and civil parish in County Cavan, Ireland
- Kilbride, County Down, townland in County Down, Northern Ireland
- Kilbride, County Dublin (civil parish), in County Dublin, Ireland
- Kilbride, Trim, County Meath, settlement near Trim in Dunderry parish
- Kilbride, Ratoath, County Meath
- Kilbride, County Waterford, townland in Ireland
- Kilbride, County Westmeath (civil parish), in Fartullagh, County Westmeath, Ireland
- Kilbride, County Westmeath, townland in Kilbride, Fartullagh, County Westmeath, Ireland

==== County Wicklow ====
- Kilbride, County Wicklow, village in Leinster, Ireland, also called Manor Kilbride
- Kilbride, County Wicklow, a townland in the Barony of Arklow, County Wicklow
- Kilbride, County Wicklow, a Civil Parish in the Barony of Arklow, County Wicklow
- Kilbride, County Wicklow, a townland in the Barony of Rathdown, County Wicklow

=== Scotland ===
- East Kilbride, a town in South Lanarkshire
  - East Kilbride (Scottish Parliament constituency), current Holyrood constituency
  - East Kilbride (UK Parliament constituency), former Westminster constituency
- Kilbride Bay, a bay and beach on the Cowal peninsular in Argyll and Bute
- Kilbride Castle, an abandoned castle near East Kilbride in South Lanarkshire
- Kilbride, Skye, a township on the Isle of Skye
- West Kilbride, a village in North Ayrshire

== People ==
- Lord of Kilbride, a former title in the peerage of Scotland
- Denis Kilbride (1848–1924), Irish nationalist politician
- Fintan Kilbride (1927–2006), Irish Catholic priest and teacher
- Malachy Kilbride, Irish-American social justice and peace activist
- Percy Kilbride (1888–1964), American actor
- Senan Kilbride, Irish Gaelic footballer
- Thomas L. Kilbride (born 1953), American judge on the Supreme Court of Illinois
- Thomas Kilbride (politician) (1911–1986), Irish Fine Gael politician

== Ships ==
- HMS Kilbride, a British Kil-class sloop of World War I

== See also ==
- Kilbryde Castle a castle in southern Perthshire, Scotland
