= Toberpatrick =

Toberpatrick (from Irish Tobar Phádraig, meaning 'Patrick's Well') may refer to several places in Ireland:

- An old name for Patrickswell, a small town in County Limerick
- A townland in County Roscommon; see List of townlands of County Roscommon
- A townland in County Sligo; see List of townlands of County Sligo
- A townland in County Wicklow; see List of townlands of County Wicklow
