= Stratford-on-Slaney =

Village in County Wicklow, Ireland

Stratford-on-Slaney Áth na Sráide
- Village
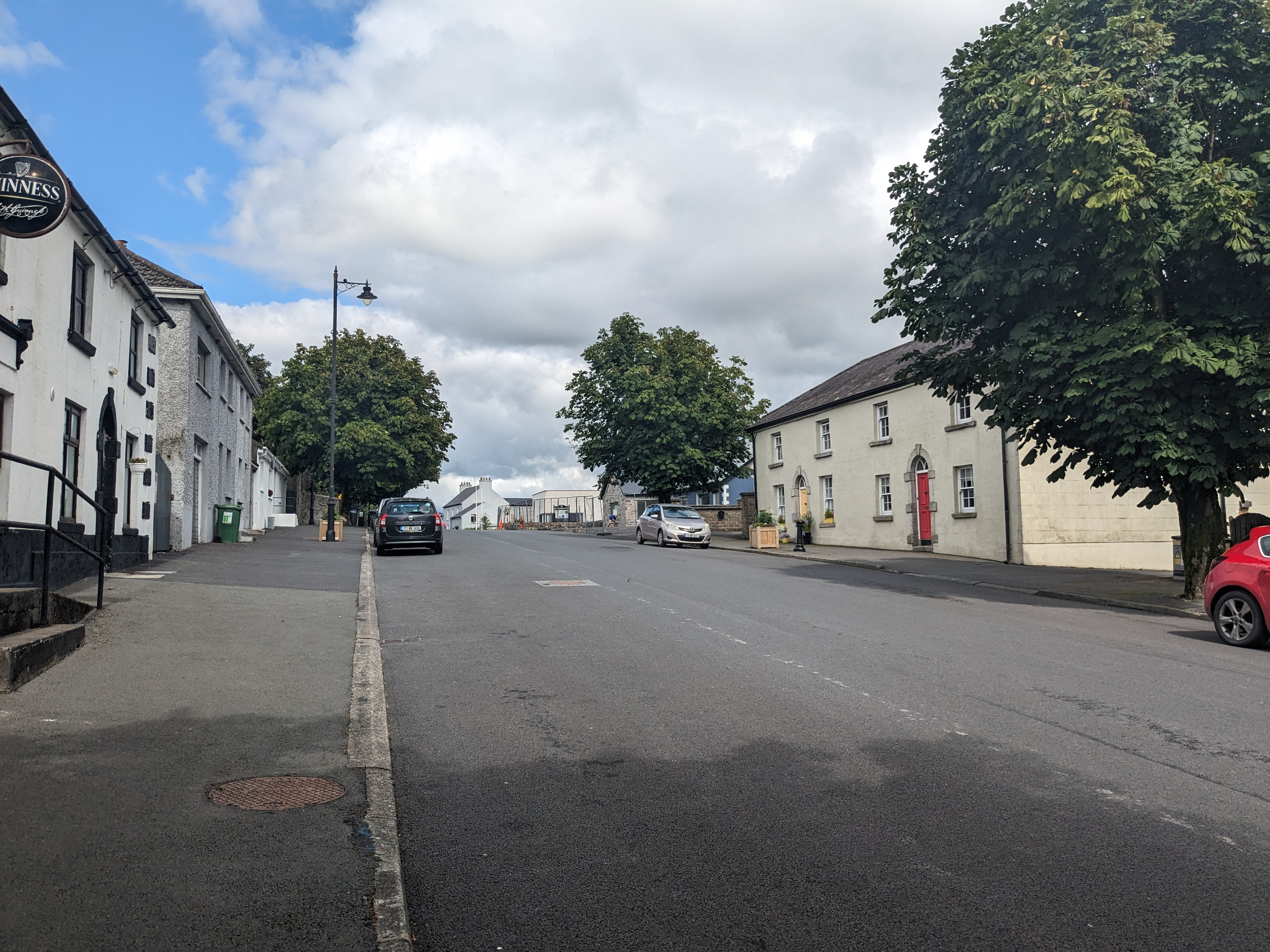
- High Street, Stratford-on-Slaney

- Location in Ireland
- Coordinates: 52°59′18″N 6°40′06″W
- Country: Ireland
- Province: Leinster
- County: County Wicklow
- Elevation: 183 m (600 ft)

Population (2016)
  - Urban: 241
- Time zone: UTC+0 (WET)
  - Summer (DST): UTC-1 (IST (WEST))
- Irish Grid Reference: S890937

Stratford-on-Slaney (Irish: Áth na Sráide, meaning 'ford of the street'), also known as Stratford or Stratford-upon-Slaney, is a small village on the River Slaney in west County Wicklow in Ireland. It was built by the Earl of Aldborough from 1774. According to the census, the village had a population of 241.

== History ==
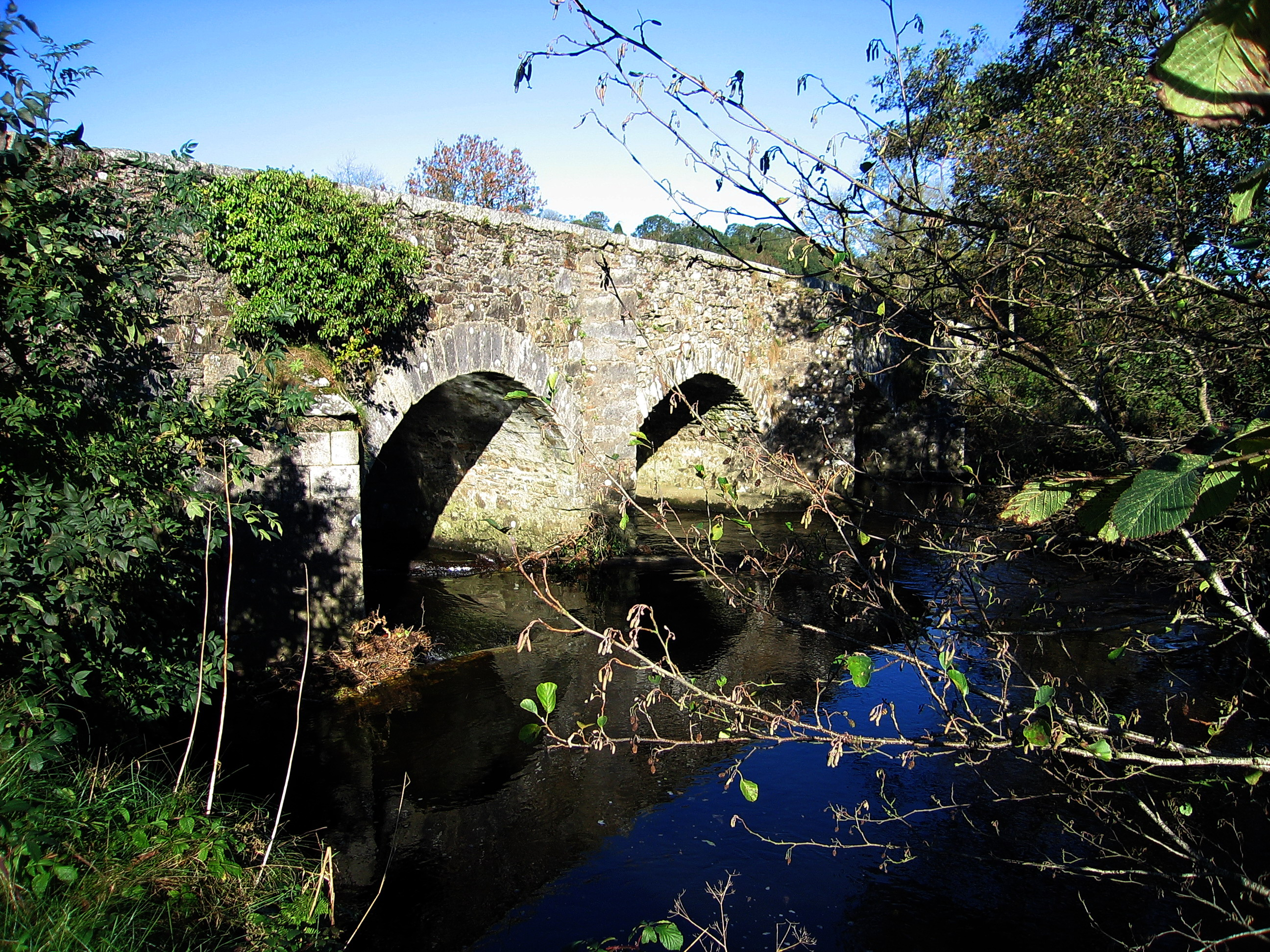
River Slaney at Stratford-on-Slaney in West Wicklow

Stratford-on-Slaney is a small village but has a notable industrial history, having played a very strategic role in the Irish cotton and linen industries in the 18th and 19th centuries.

=== Earl of Aldborough ===
Edward Stratford, 2nd Earl of Aldborough, built this settlement from 1774, and gave it his family name, Stratford. It is built on the summit of a hill above the river Slaney. When Aldborough was in need of money in 1787 he attempted to sell to a merchant or manufacturer but didn't go through with it. During this time Stratford was known as a large town and had approximately 40 stone houses which were mainly occupied by Protestants. Aldborough clearly showed that he felt it was important for homes to be kept in good condition with no scraps left on streets and at doors, these homes were ideally to be owned by tradesmen and commendable manufacturers. A lot of houses and buildings were left unfinished at this time including 26 one-storeyed houses, a school, and a church. Cotton and calico printing works were established in Stratford-on-Slaney in 1792. There were at least thirteen public houses. There were twelve streets with 108 houses, four squares, Winetavern Street, Church Road and the Octagon.

The famine and the deadly fever of 1847 had a very negative impact on the town. A large proportion of the migrant workers returned to Paisley in Scotland and Hillsborough in County Down. The mill was sold in 1852 for the last time and "by the mid 1960s, Stratford stood bare, with the exception of a dozen or so houses and the ruins of what once was one man's dream". The Aldborough family were deeply rooted in the development of Stratford-on-Slaney as a town and also as a manufacturing centre.

=== Orr family ===
Stratford-on-Slaney was sold by the Aldborough family to Mr. Orr, who owned a company called Smith Orrs’ & Sons. This company had an address in Dublin at 8 Merchants Quay, operating from there between 1782 and 1795.

According to Lewis's Topographical Dictionary of 1837, Stratford-upon-Slaney was at that time a market town in the barony of Upper Talbotstown 2¼ miles north north east of Baltinglass. At that time the town had 2,833 inhabitants. In 1837 Orr and Co. bought the factory from the Stratford family. Early in the nineteenth century, when Stratford-on-Slaney was at its busiest, Orr Smith & Co. employed more than a 1,000 people and turned out about 2,000 finished pieces per week. The factory had a canal that brought water directly to the wheel and it was seen as the best wheel in Ireland, the factory was fitted quite ideally for manufacturing of cotton. The Orrs were a prosperous cotton manufacturing and printing firm that, in Stratford-on-Slaney, added calico weaving and printing in the early 1790s.

They sold their works to John Swainson a Preston cotton merchant circa 1837, and the Orrs continued their business in Scotland.

=== Development ===
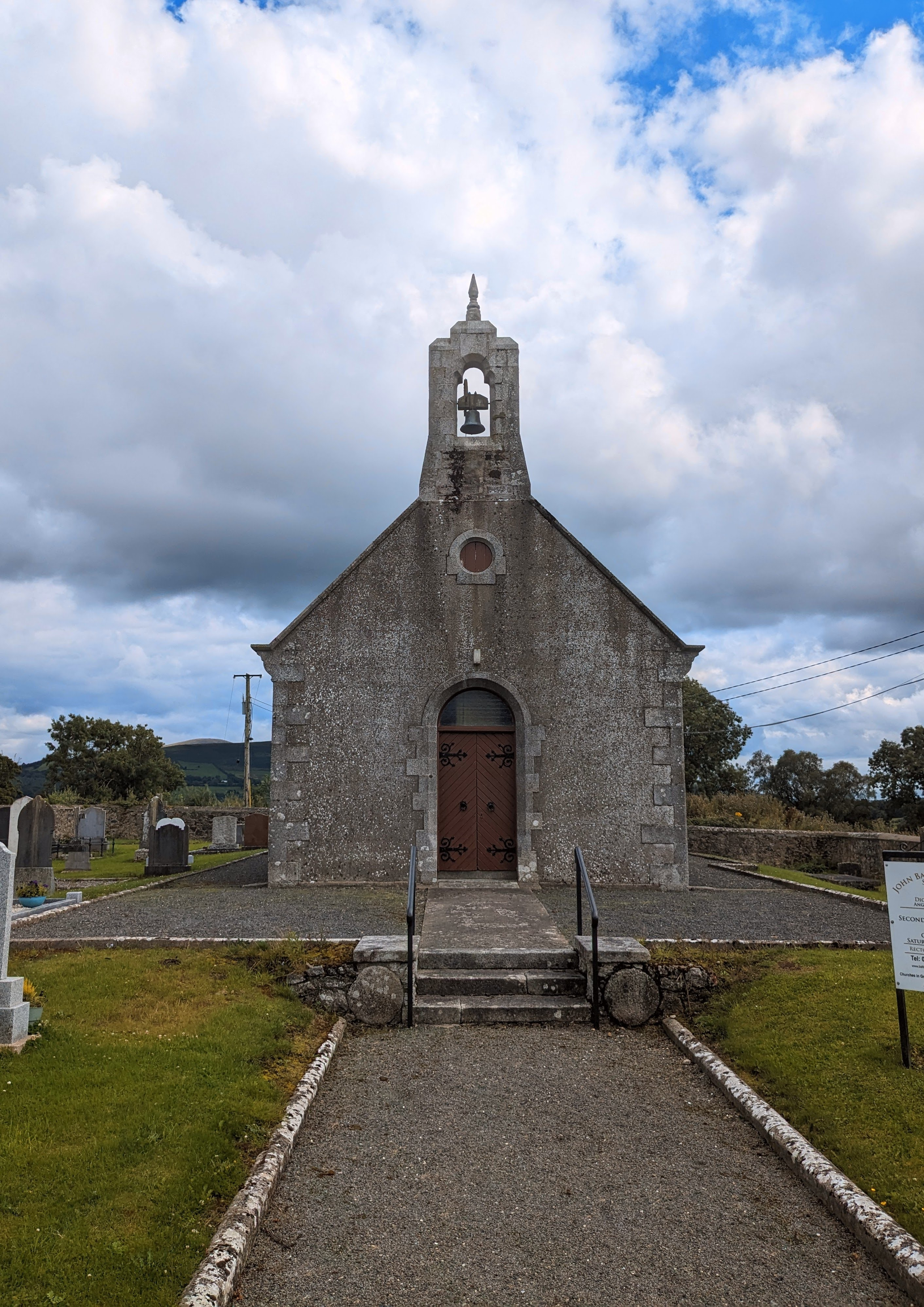
Church of Saint John the Baptist, Stratford-on-Slaney

Due to the climate in the South, which was moist and provided an ideal setting for cotton cultivation, Stratford saw potential for the creation of textile businesses in that region. With the development of the residential, public, and industry systems, Stratford worked to create a model industrial town. At its peak, Stratford-on-Slaney had three churches and fourteen taverns, and its population was close to three thousand.The town had four squares, Winetavern Street, Church Road, and the Octagon in addition to twelve streets with 108 dwellings each. There were a minimum of thirteen bars.

The double crescent plan of Stratford-on-Slaney's town plan is its most notable feature. The town's layout was inspired by the town of Bath as it served as a model for Stratford-on-Slaney as they built a model industrial town on a smaller scale. In 1787, the town's first construction consisted of four streets that were arranged at right angles with an octagonal square in the middle. The octagonal square was connected to a crescent of homes by a street as the town continued to grow. Additionally, Stratford-on-Slaney and the circle were introduced. Six streets were added to the town in 1789 as it continued to grow.

However, in the mid nineteenth century Stratford-on-Slaney began to decline. The industrial town failed despite Stratford and his family making a sizable investment.

Today, the town of Stratford-on-Slaney is considered a large village settlement. These are bigger rural communities with a fair amount of physical and social infrastructure already in place.

=== Other sites ===
The Forge, Dispensary and Barracks along with most of the houses built by Stratford are gone. The village has won many Tidy Towns Awards including a Highly Commended Award in the Tidy Towns Competition in 2014.

The post office that had existed for 175 years, having opened on 6 March 1833, was closed by An Post in March 2008.

== Amenities ==
St. Mary’s Church is the Roman Catholic church in the village. The church dates to c. 1840 and was built on the site of an earlier church building. The Church of Saint John the Baptist is a small, Romanesque Church of Ireland church in the village that dates to c. 1860. A small Seventh-Day Adventist church is located south of the village in nearby Ballinacrow.

Scoil Náisiúnta Mhuire is a coeducational primary school in the village. As of July 2023, it had an enrolment of 65 pupils.

There is a short nature walk that starts in the village.

There is a GAA pitch and grounds a short distance north of Stratford village. The first GAA club in Stratford was founded in 1896 under the name Stratford Bohemians. In 1935 the club was re-established and joined with nearby Grangecon to form Stratford Grangecon GAA club.

== Samuel Lewis' description ==
According to Samuel Lewis' 1837 Topographical Directory of Ireland Stratford was

a market-town and a parochial district, in the barony of Upper Talbotstown, county of Wicklow, and province of Leinster, 2¼ miles (N.N.E.) from Baltinglass (to which it has a penny post), near the road to Wexford, through Tullow; containing 2833 inhabitants, of which number, 952 are in the town. This town, which is of recent date, owes its origin to Edward, late Earl of Aldborough, who, towards the close of the last century, conferred upon it his family name, "Stratford," and distinguished it from other places of that name by the adjunct which describes its situation on the Slaney. A battle was fought here during the 1798 Rebellion. It is built on the summit of a considerable hill rising from the bank of the river, and is regularly laid out in streets and squares, and commands most extensive views, including the windings of the river. Adjoining the town, on the bank of the river, are extensive cotton and calico printing works, established in 1792, by Messrs. Orr and Co., the present proprietors; they employ from 800 to 1000 persons: the machinery is worked by water power, and the average number of pieces printed and finished weekly is about 2000. The market is on Tuesday and Saturday, and by the patent the town is entitled to two annual fairs, which have never yet been held.

== People ==
- Baron Henniker of Stratford-upon-Slaney
- Edward Jeffares, cricketer

== See also ==
- List of towns and villages in Ireland
- Prosperous, County Kildare
