= Hempstown =

- Townland
- Location in Ireland
- Coordinates: 53°11′46″N 6°29′56″W
- Country: Ireland
- Province: Leinster
- County: Wicklow and Kildare Counties
- Elevation: 280 m (920 ft)
- Time zone: UTC+0 (WET)
  - Summer (DST): UTC-1 (IST (WEST))
- Irish Grid Reference: N976142

Hempstown and Hempstown Commons are neighbouring townlands, located in Wicklow and Kildare Counties respectively, in Ireland. Separated by the N81 road, the two are located approximately two miles from Blessington. The area consists of mainly arable farmland, dairy cows, cattle, and sheep farming. Industries include concrete manufacturing and shale quarries. Hempstown Clay Pigeon Club use some of these quarries as a clay pigeon shooting ground.

== Transport ==
The townlands are served multiple times a day by route number 65 of Dublin Bus. The journey to Dublin takes between 1-1.5 hours depending on traffic, and terminates in Dublin city centre at Poolbeg Street.
