= Liscolman =

Liscolman Lios Cholmáin
- Townland
- Location within Ireland
- Coordinates: 52.826°N 6.654°W

Area
  - Total: 384.69 ha (950.59 acres)
- Eircode: R93

Liscolman (Irish: Lios Cholmáin) is a small townland in County Wicklow, Ireland. It is in a civil parish of the same name, in the Barony of Shillelagh. The townland has an area of approximately 950 acres (3.8 km^{2}). As of the 2011 census, the townland had a population of 65 people.
