= Ballyronan, County Wicklow =

Ballyronan
- Townland
- Location in Ireland
- Coordinates: 53°06′11″N 6°05′42″W
- Country: Ireland
- Province: Leinster
- County: Wicklow

Area
  - Total: 0.68 km^{2} (0.26 sq mi)
- Elevation: 74 m (243 ft)
- Time zone: UTC+0 (WET)
  - Summer (DST): UTC-1 (IST (WEST))
- Irish Grid Reference: O 274 076

Ballyronan (Irish: Baile Uí Rónáin) is a townland, located in County Wicklow, Ireland. Ballyronan is located south-east of the village of Kilpedder and north-east of the village of Newtownmountkennedy. The townland is bordered by Kilpedder West, Seaview and Kilpedder East to the north, Kilquade to the east, Ballygarret to the south and Mount Kennedy Demesne to the west. Today, it is considered a part of Kilpedder or Kilquade.

== History ==
Ballyronan was once part of the Barony of Newcastle and the Poor Law Union of Rathdrum. Around 1840, the townland was recorded as having an area of 155 acres, 2 roods and 29 perches (63.00 hectares). About a century later, the townland’s area had decreased to 153 acres, 3 roods and 0 perches (62.22 hectares). The boundaries of Ballyronan did change between this time, with the townland losing approximately 1 acres, 3 roods and 29 perches (0.78 hectares) in the south-west of the townland to Mount Kennedy Demesne.

== Present Day ==
The townland is part of the Civil Parish of Kilcoole and the Electoral Division of Kilcoole. Ballyronan is mainly used for argucultural purposes. A number of residential dwellings are located on Ballyronan Road.
