= Butterhill =

- Townland
- Location in Ireland
- Coordinates: 53°09′57″N 6°30′20″W
- Country: Ireland
- Province: Leinster
- County: County Wicklow

Area
  - Townland: 1.66 km^{2} (0.64 sq mi)
- Elevation: 270 m (890 ft)

Population (2006)
  - Urban: 150
- Time zone: UTC+0 (WET)
  - Summer (DST): UTC-1 (IST (WEST))
- Irish Grid Reference: N976142

Butterhill is a townland in County Wicklow, Ireland, located near the town of Blessington.

== History ==
During the 1930s and 1940s, some residents of Butterhill were displaced when the Poulaphouca Reservoir was created by damming of the River Liffey.

Butterhill is known in antiquarian circles for the distinctive burial mound situated in the centre of the townland, thought to date back to the 5th century.

== Geography ==
This townland is situated on a hill overlooking Blessington Lake, in the west of County Wicklow.

Butterhill is a townland in the postal address system, and is adjacent to the townlands Rathnabo, Carrig, Knockiernan, Blackrock, and Woodend.

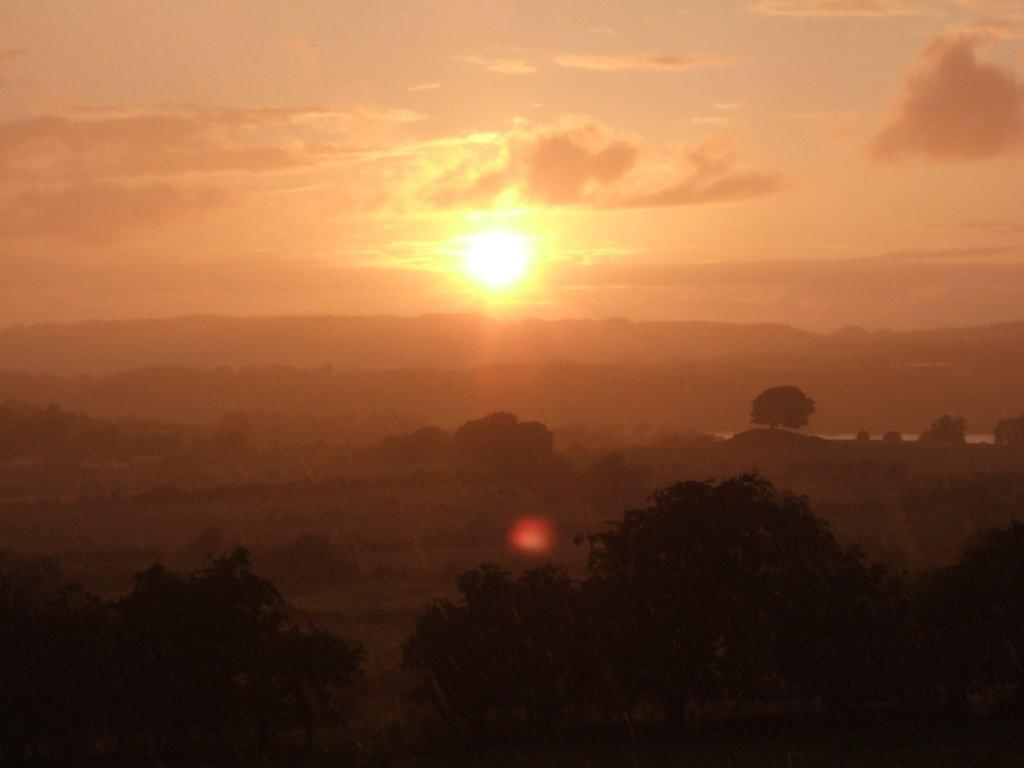
The sunset over Butterhill.

Mist lingering over butterhill.

Rainbow over butterhill.

== Film ==
A number of movies have used the area around Butterhill as a backdrop for their productions:

- This Is My Father; the tree featured on the cover of the film, and used in the final scene, is the oak tree perched atop of Butterhill Mound.

== See also ==
- Blessington.
