= Curravanish =

Townland in County Wicklow, Ireland

Coordinates: 52°48′36″N 6°29′17″W

Curravanish (Irish: Corr Mhánais) is a small townland in the south-west of County Wicklow, Ireland.
