= Upper Talbotstown =

Upper Talbotstown Baile an Talbóidigh Uachtarach (Irish)
- Barony
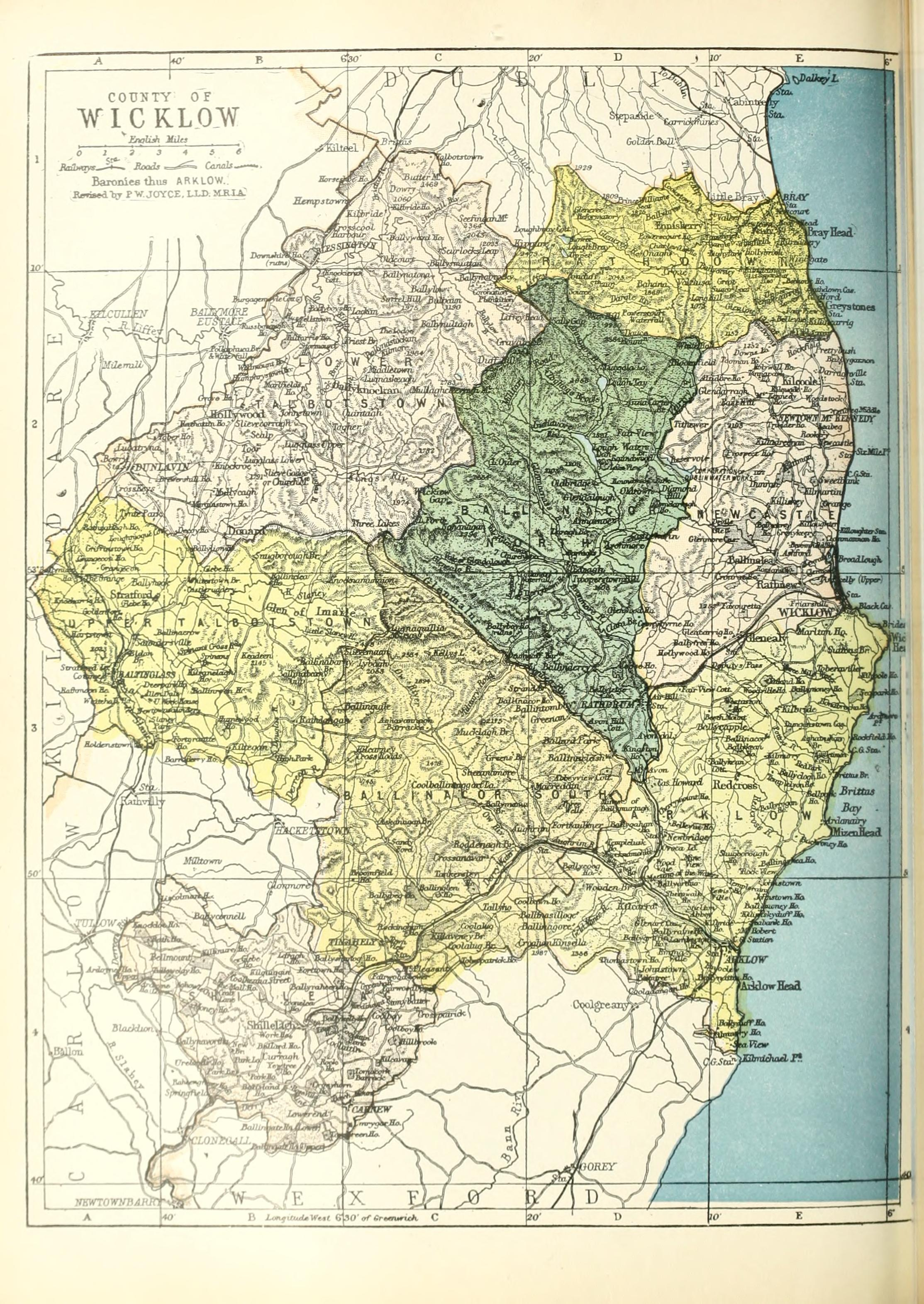
- Baronies of County Wicklow. Upper Talbotstown is in the west.
- Sovereign state: Ireland
- County: Wicklow

Area
  - Total: 252.97 km^{2} (97.67 sq mi)

Upper Talbotstown (Irish: Baile an Talbóidigh Uachtarach) is a barony in County Wicklow, Ireland.

== Etymology ==
Upper Talbotstown derives its name from Talbotstown village, near Kilbride.

== Location ==
Upper Talbotstown is located in west County Wicklow, covering much of the Glen of Imaal and the upper Slaney valley.

== History ==
The Uí Máil were centred in Upper Talbotstown from the 7th century. The Ua Tuathail (O'Tooles) were driven here in the late 12th century. The original barony was split into lower and upper halves by 1801.

== List of settlements ==
Below is a list of settlements in Upper Talbotstown:

- Baltinglass
- Kiltegan
- Stratford-on-Slaney
