= Newcastle (County Wicklow barony) =

Barony (administrative area) in Ireland

Newcastle An Caisleán Nua (Irish)
- Barony
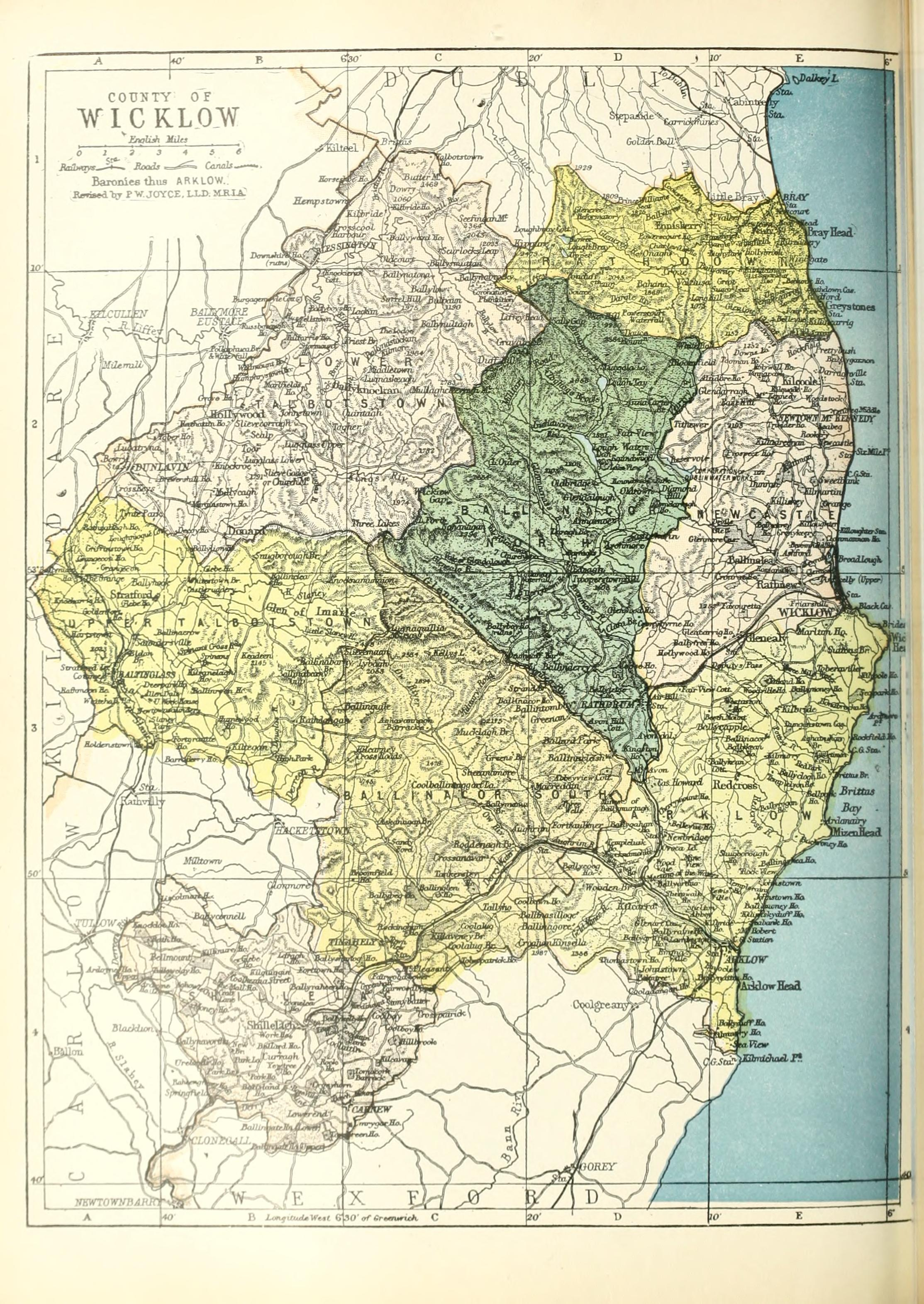
- Baronies of County Wicklow. Newcastle is in the east.
- Sovereign state: Ireland
- County: Wicklow

Area
  - Total: 210.19 km^{2} (81.15 sq mi)

Newcastle (Irish: An Caisleán Nua) is a barony in County Wicklow, Ireland.

== Etymology ==
Newcastle barony derives its name from the village of Newcastle.

== Location ==
Newcastle barony is located in eastern County Wicklow, opening onto the Irish Sea.

== History ==
The Uí Theig (O'Tighe), cousins to the Uí Máil, are noted early here, as well as the Uí Braen Deilgni, a branch of the Uí Garrchon. This was part of O'Byrne (Ó Broin) country after the 12th century, referred to in Gaelic as Crioch Branach.

== List of settlements ==
Below is a list of settlements in Newcastle barony:

- Ashford
- Glenealy (northern part)
- Kilcoole
- Newcastle
- Newtownmountkennedy
