= Lower Talbotstown =

Lower Talbotstown Baile an Talbóidigh Íochtarach (Irish)
- Barony
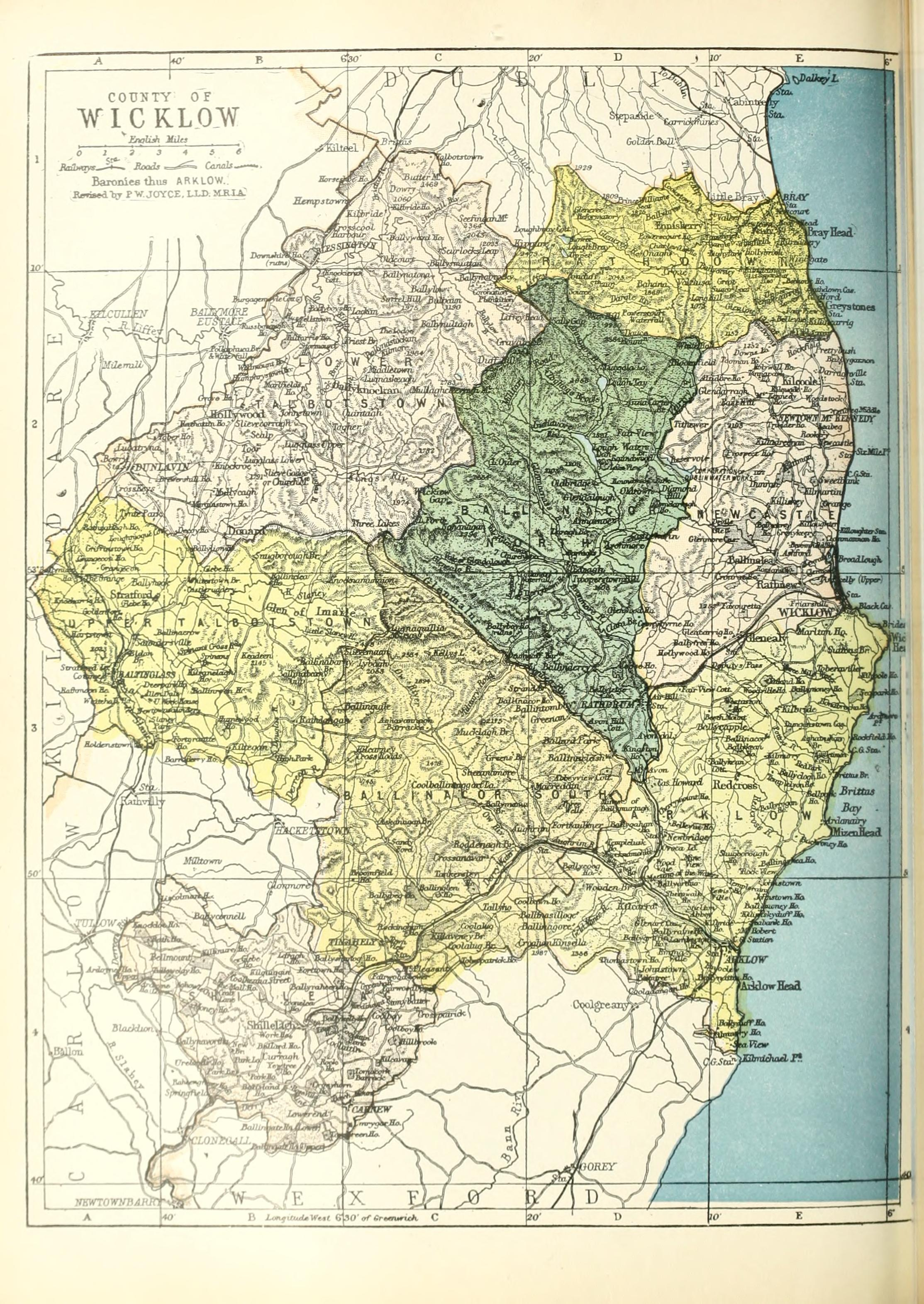
- Baronies of County Wicklow. Lower Talbotstown is in the west.
- Sovereign state: Ireland
- County: Wicklow

Area
  - Total: 359.0 km^{2} (138.6 sq mi)

Lower Talbotstown (Irish: Baile an Talbóidigh Íochtarach) is a barony in County Wicklow, Ireland.

== Etymology ==
Lower Talbotstown derives its name from Talbotstown townland, in Kilbride.

== Location ==
Lower Talbotstown is located in northwest County Wicklow.

== History ==
Lower Talbotstown: Ó Ceallaigh (O'Kelly) of Cualan were also known as chiefs of Uí Máil and their neighbors were the O'Tooles who were driven here across the border of Kildare in the late 12th century by the Normans. The original barony was split into upper and lower halves by 1801.

== List of settlements ==
Below is a list of settlements in Lower Talbotstown:

- Ballyknockan
- Blessington
- Donard
- Dunlavin
- Hollywood
