= R830 road (Ireland) =

Road in Ireland

R830 road
- Bóthar R830
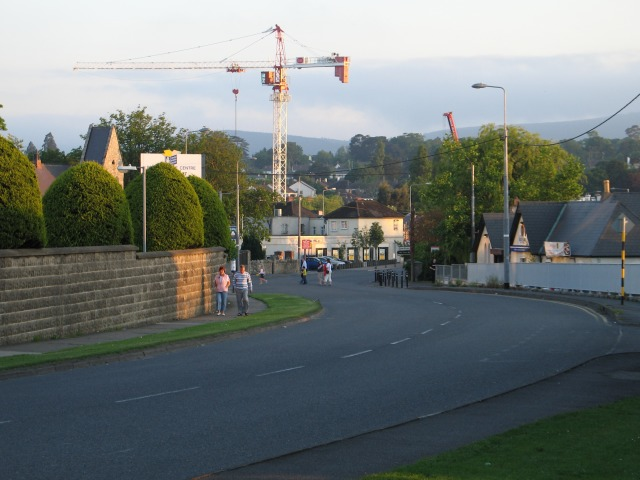
- Kill Lane in Deansgrange, on the R830

Route information
- Length: 3 km (1.9 mi)

Location
- Country: Ireland
- Primary destinations: Dún Laoghaire–Rathdown; N11 (Stillorgan Road); Kill Lane; Kill Avenue; R829 (Glenageary Road Upper); York Road; R119 (Cumberland Street)

Highway system
- Roads in Ireland; Motorways; Primary; Secondary; Regional

The R830 road is a regional road in Dún Laoghaire–Rathdown, Ireland.

The official definition of the R830 from the Roads Act 1993 (Classification of Regional Roads) Order 2012 states:

R830: Foxrock - Dún Laoghaire, County Dublin

Between its junction with N11 at Stillorgan Road and its junction with R829 at Glenageary Road Upper via Kill Lane and Kill Avenue all in the county of Dún Laoghaire–Rathdown

and

between its junction with R829 at Mounttown Upper and its junction with R119 at Cumberland Street via York Road all in the county of Dún Laoghaire–Rathdown.

The road is 3 kilometres (1.9 mi) long.

== See also ==
- Roads in Ireland
- National primary road
- Regional road
