= Kilquade =

Townland in County Wicklow, Ireland

Coordinates: 53.1039°N 6.0849°W

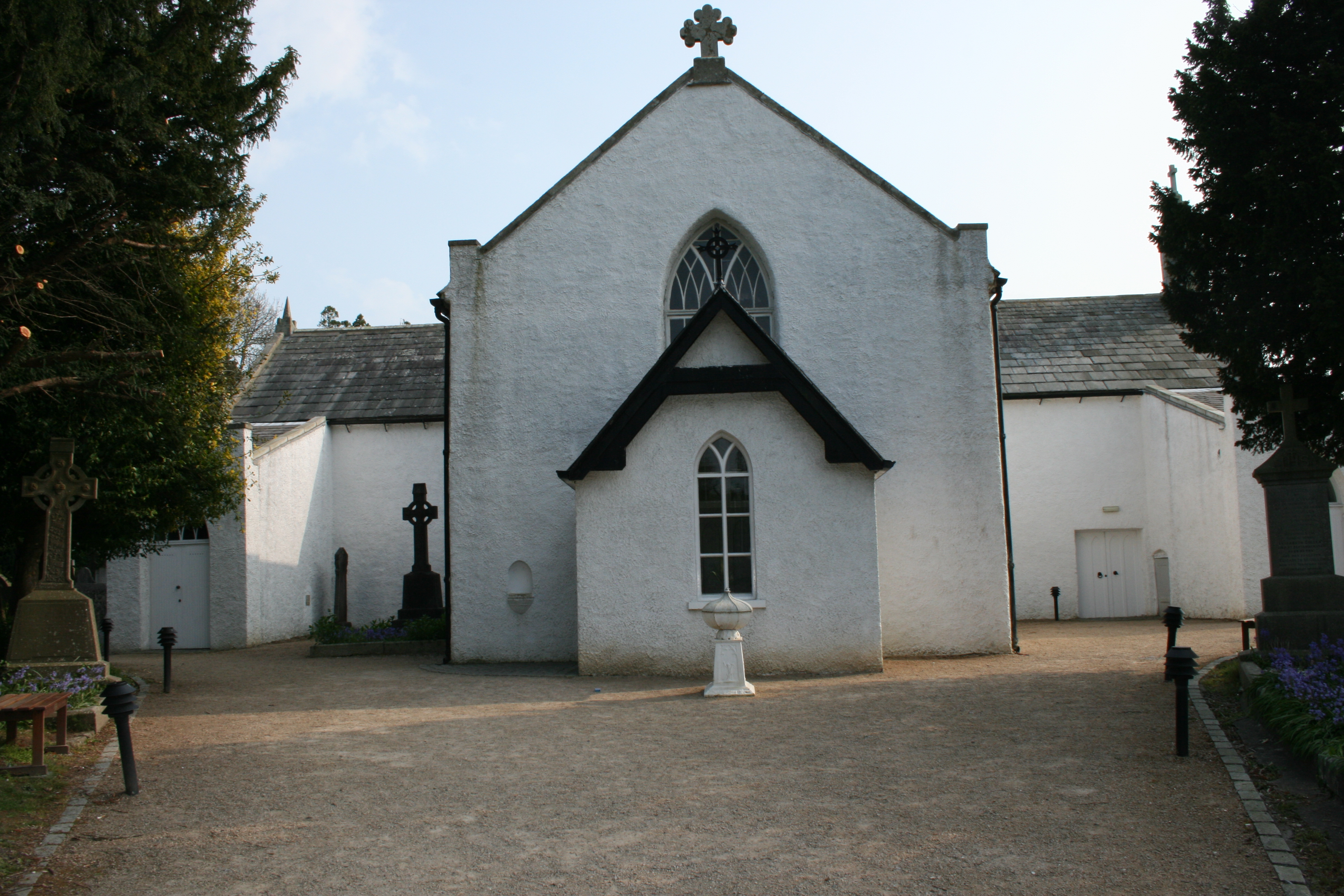
St Patrick's Church, Kilquade

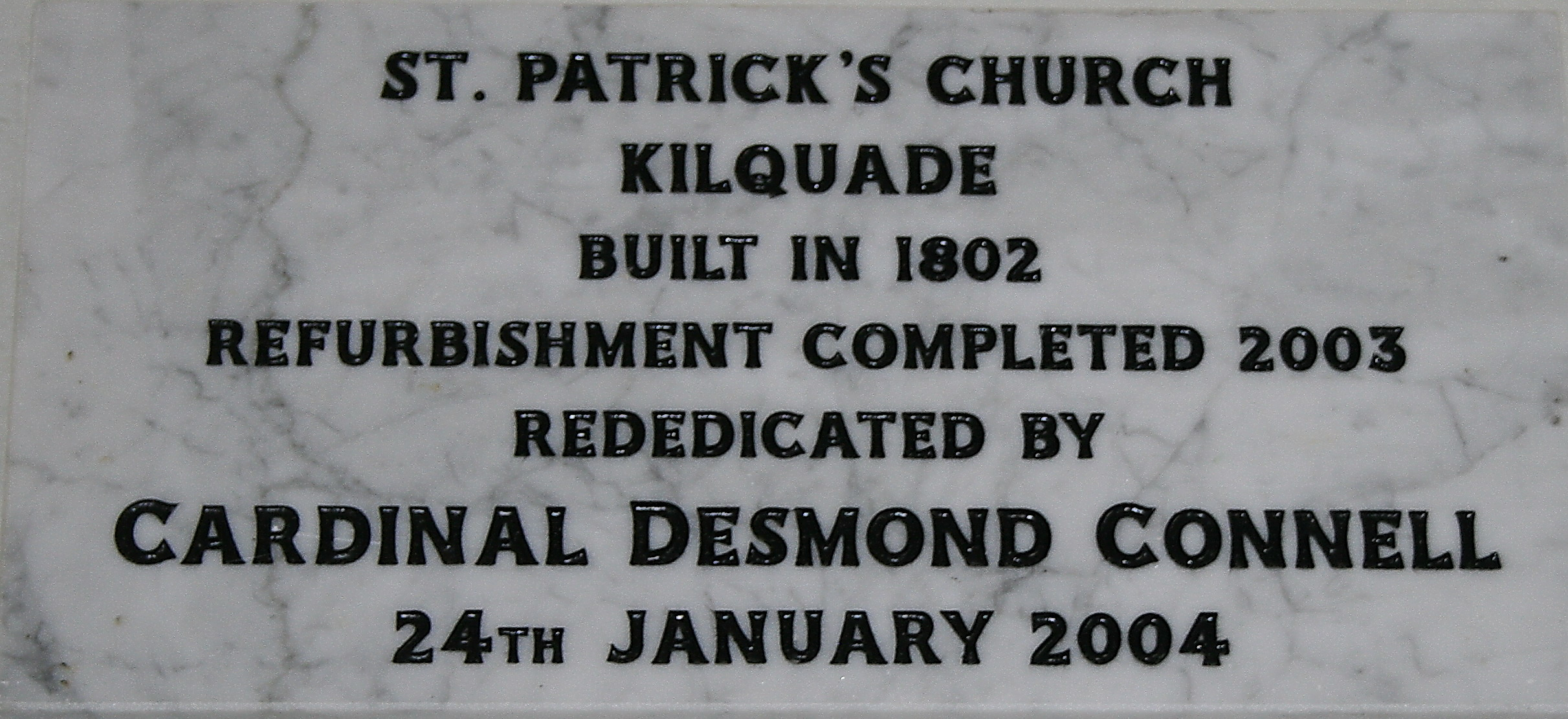
Church plaque

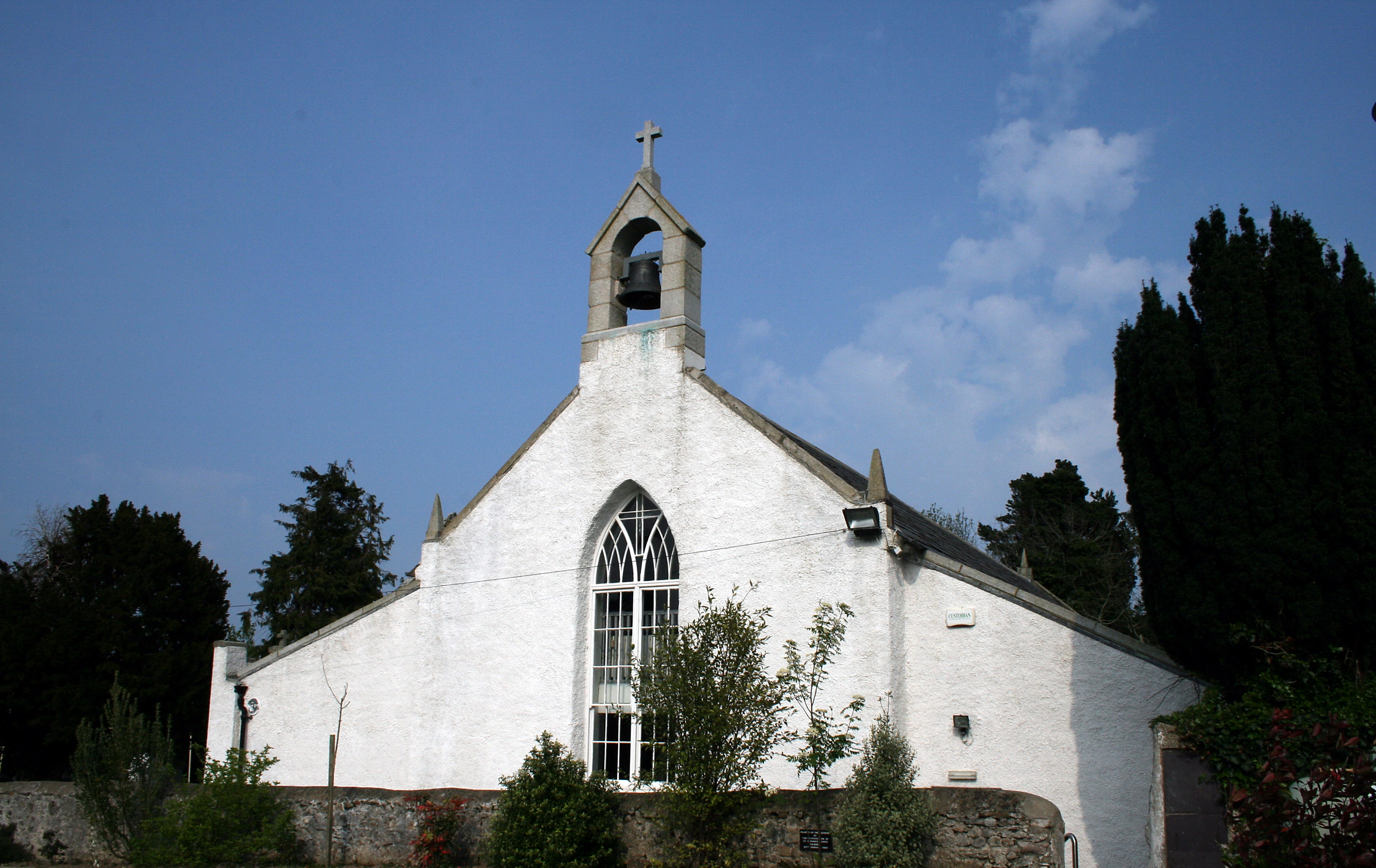
Church view

Kilquade, historically Killcowade (Irish: Cill Chomhaid), is a townland and a Roman Catholic parish in north County Wicklow, Ireland. It lies between Kilpedder and Kilcoole, about one kilometre east of Junction 12 (Kilpedder) of the N11 national primary route. It is part of the barony of Newcastle and lies within both the civil parishes of Kilcoole and Newcastle Lower.

The church, St. Patrick's, was built in 1802, refurbished in 2002-2003 and rededicated in 2004. Directly across the road from the church is the National Garden Exhibition Centre.

== Catholic parish ==
The Catholic Parish of Kilquade includes the areas of Kilquade, Kilpedder, Kilcoole, Newcastle, Delgany and Newtownmountkennedy. The parish has three churches, the parish church at Kilquade and chapels at Newtownmountkenneddy and Kilcoole.

The parish church was restored to mark its bicentenary in 2002 and refurbished in 2004. The original church was burned down during the 1798 Rebellion, but was rebuilt in 1802, and many of its original features such as the old stone floor and the windows above the sanctuary were restored.

St Patrick's Church, Kilquade has a long history. The name Kilquade (Irish: Cill Comhghaid) refers to St. Comghaid who had a hermit's cell or a church in the area. There was a Catholic community in the area in the 17th century, two chalices still in use, bear the inscription "Anno Domini 1633" and "24th November 1759". Official records from 1701 list Fr. Seneca Fitzwilliam as the incumbent priest recognized by the British government under the Penal Laws.

Tradition in the area relates that the original church was burnt down in the time of Cromwell and rebuilt again, and in 1798 the church was definitely burnt down. In 1802, the present church was built. Part of the funding for the new building was in the form of a "Restoration Grant" of £77 which came from the British government. Consequently, St Patrick’s Church is known as a "Compensation Church" and is the only such church remaining in the Dublin Diocese.

== See also ==
- List of towns and villages in Ireland
