= Newtownmountkennedy =

Town in County Wicklow, Ireland

Newtownmountkennedy Irish: Baile an Chinnéidigh
- Town
- Main Street

- Location in Ireland
- Coordinates: 53°05′24″N 6°06′37″W
- Country: Ireland
- Province: Leinster
- County: County Wicklow
- Elevation: 82 m (269 ft)

Population (2016)
  - Total: 2,835
  - Demonym: Newtowner
- Time zone: UTC+0 (WET)
  - Summer (DST): UTC+1 (IST (WEST))
- Irish Grid Reference: O262062

Newtownmountkennedy (Irish: Baile an Chinnéidigh, meaning 'Kennedy's town') is a small town in County Wicklow, Ireland. It developed within the historic townland of Ballygarny (Irish: Baile Ó gCearnaigh) (now Mount Kennedy Demesne), although all that remains is a motte where a church, graveyard and a castle or tower house once stood just 0.85 km (0.53 mi) north of the town. It acquired its present name in the mid-seventeenth-century, when Sir Robert Kennedy, M.P. for Kildare, made it his principal residence. It is just off the N11 road to Wexford, just south of Kilpedder and south-west of Greystones. It is about 15 km (9.3 mi) north of Wicklow town, 15 km (9.3 mi) south of Bray and approximately 35 km (22 mi) from Dublin. This town has one of the longest place names in Ireland, so is sometimes abbreviated to NTMK and it often referred to by locals as simply Newtown.

Between the 2011 and 2016 census, the population of the town increased by 17.6% (from 2,410 to 2,835 inhabitants), one of the highest growth rates in County Wicklow on the period. The area is a dormitory town for some workers commuting to Bray and Dublin.

The headquarters of Coillte, the Irish Forestry Board, are situated in the village forest. Newtownmountkennedy is in the Roman Catholic parish of Kilquade, and one of the Kilquade parish's two chapels of ease is located in the village at the junction with the Roundwood Road.

== Education ==
Newtownmountkennedy Primary School (St. Joseph's Boys National School and St. Bridget's Girls National School) is located just west of the village. It was formerly split into three buildings, one for male students, and one for female students, while the third building was used as a centre for autism. The boys' school was known as St Joseph's, while the girls' school was known as St Bridget's. In 2007, the two schools were merged, leaving the lower classes (junior infants, senior infants, first class and second class) in the former girls' school, while the remaining classes (third class through sixth class) took residence in the former boys' school. The autism centre stayed in the third building. The name given to the new school is Newtownmountkennedy Primary School. As there is no secondary school in Newtownmountkennedy, a majority of secondary school students travel to Coláiste Chraobh Abhann in neighbouring Kilcoole.

== Transport ==
The area is served by the L1 bus route operated by Go-Ahead Ireland connecting the town with Kilpedder, Greystones and Bray. Bus Éireann route 133 connects the town with Dublin and Wicklow, as well as route 131, which runs between Wicklow and Bray. The closest train station is Kilcoole, which was opened with the name Kilcoole and Newtownmountkennedy, despite the station being just under 5 km (3.1 mi) from the town. Greystones and the further Bray Daly station are accessible by route L1 and route 131. The nearest airport is Dublin Airport, and the nearest airfield is Newcastle Aerodrome. The closest ferry ports are Dublin Port to the north and Rosslare Europort to the south.

The R772 regional road passes through the village. This was the main Dublin-Wexford route, the N11, but the village was bypassed by the new N11 dual carriageway in 1990.

== Sports ==
=== Gaelic games ===
The local Gaelic Athletic Association (GAA) club, Newtown GAA or Baile Uí gCearnaigh in Irish, was founded in 1887. The club has two adult teams, one contesting the Senior League and Championship, and one contesting the Junior A League and Championship. The club, which also has several underage teams, holds a number of county championship titles, including the County Senior Championship, won in 1964 and 1975. Newtown GAA club plays in Black and White, leading to some fans to dub them "The Magpies".

=== Association football ===
Newtown has two association football (soccer) clubs, Newtown United and Newtown Juniors. Newtown Juniors are for players up until the age of 16. After that, they move on to the senior teams of Newtown United. Both teams use the same home ground, the Matt Kelly Community Grounds.

=== Golf ===
Druids Glen Golf Resort, which hosted the Irish open from 1996 to 1999, is located about a kilometre east of Newtown. Druids Heath Golf Course, another championship course, is also located in Druids Glen. Glen Mill Golf Club is located to the south of Newtown, past Killadreenan.

== Economy ==
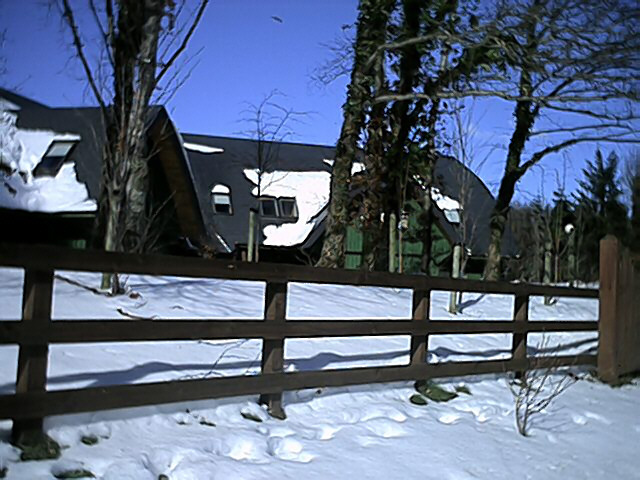
Coillte HQ in Newtownmountkennedy

Coillte, the Irish Forestry operator, has its headquarters just north of the town. French company Procap had its Northern European plant in the town. There is also a small industrial estate located to the south of the town.

The Parkview Hotel opened in the village centre in March 2007. The hotel has 60 bedrooms and conference facilities.

Ecologic received planning permission to build a data centre in Newtownmountkennedy that has an area of 1.1 million square feet (100,000 square metres). This plan was approved by the Supreme Court in December 2013 after numerous appeals by An Bord Pleanála and quashing the High Court's refusal to approve the development.

There is also a shopping centre in the town, which includes a Dunnes Stores, a pharmacy and a cafe. A major development was the creation, in 2015, of a new housing development, "Wicklow Hills", which comprises a mix of two-, three- and four-bedroom houses.

As of 2023, the town is home to a number of food and drink producing businesses.

== River Lodge House ==
In March 2024, following a number of anti-immigration protests elsewhere in Ireland, locals and other activists began picketing at River Lodge House, a vacant Health Service Executive property on the outskirts of the village, at which works were planned to provide accommodation for international protection applicants. On 25 April 2024, the situation escalated and the Garda Public Order Unit was deployed. A fire was started, clashes broke out, and a number of people were sprayed with CS gas. Three Garda vehicles were damaged. Four local people were subsequently charged with public order offences.

== People ==
- Clive Clarke, former footballer.
- Sonny Condell, Irish singer-songwriter, multi-instrumentalist, and graphic artist.
- Leo Cullen, coach (and former captain) of Leinster Rugby.
- Paul Heffernan, former professional footballer with several English Football League and Scottish Premiership sides, coach of League of Ireland side Bray Wanderers FC.
- Sir Richard Kennedy, 2nd Baronet, High Court judge and head of the Kennedy family who gave their name to the town.
- John David Digues La Touche (1861–1935), Irish ornithologist, naturalist, and zoologist retired in the town
- Mason Melia, professional footballer.
- Dean Odlum, Wicklow Gaelic footballer.

== See also ==
- List of towns and villages in Ireland
