= R768 road (Ireland) =

Road in Ireland

R768 road
- Bóthar R768
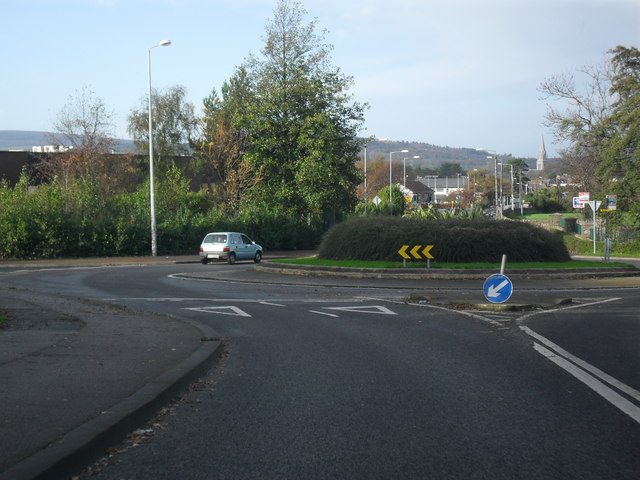
- Roundabout where the R768 ends at the R761

Route information
- Length: 2.8 km (1.7 mi)

Location
- Country: Ireland
- Primary destinations: County Wicklow; Kilcroney; Ballywaltrim; Kilruddery; Irishtown

Highway system
- Roads in Ireland; Motorways; Primary; Secondary; Regional

The R768 road is a regional road in Ireland which connects J7 (Bray South) of the N11 to the junction of the R761 at Irishtown, Bray. The road is commonly known as the Southern Cross or the Southern Bypass, though it is officially known as the Southern Ring Road.

== Route ==
The route begins at the Kilcroney Interchange (J7 Bray South/Greystones North), which is one of the busiest junctions in the country. The route crosses the N11 and meets the Ram Roundabout. The R768 then travels east through the majority of Bray's southern suburbs, including Ballywaltrim and Kilruddery. The route terminates in Irishtown at the roundabout with the R761.

== See also ==
- Roads in Ireland
- National primary road
