= R773 road (Ireland) =

Road in Ireland

R773 road
- Bóthar R773

Route information
- Length: 2.4 km (1.5 mi)

Location
- Country: Ireland
- Primary destinations: County Wicklow; M11 motorway; Jack White's; Brittas Bay

Highway system
- Roads in Ireland; Motorways; Primary; Secondary; Regional

The R773 road is a regional road in Ireland. The road connects Jack White's with Brittas Bay and the coast.

== Route ==
The route begins at its junction with the M11 near Jack White's Pub. The route travels east towards Brittas Bay passing a few housing estates. The route terminates at its junction with the R750 in Brittas Bay.

== See also ==
- Roads in Ireland
- National primary road
- National secondary road
