= R762 road (Ireland) =

Road in Ireland

The R762 road is a regional road in County Wicklow, Ireland, which connects the R761 at Greystones to the N11 national primary road.

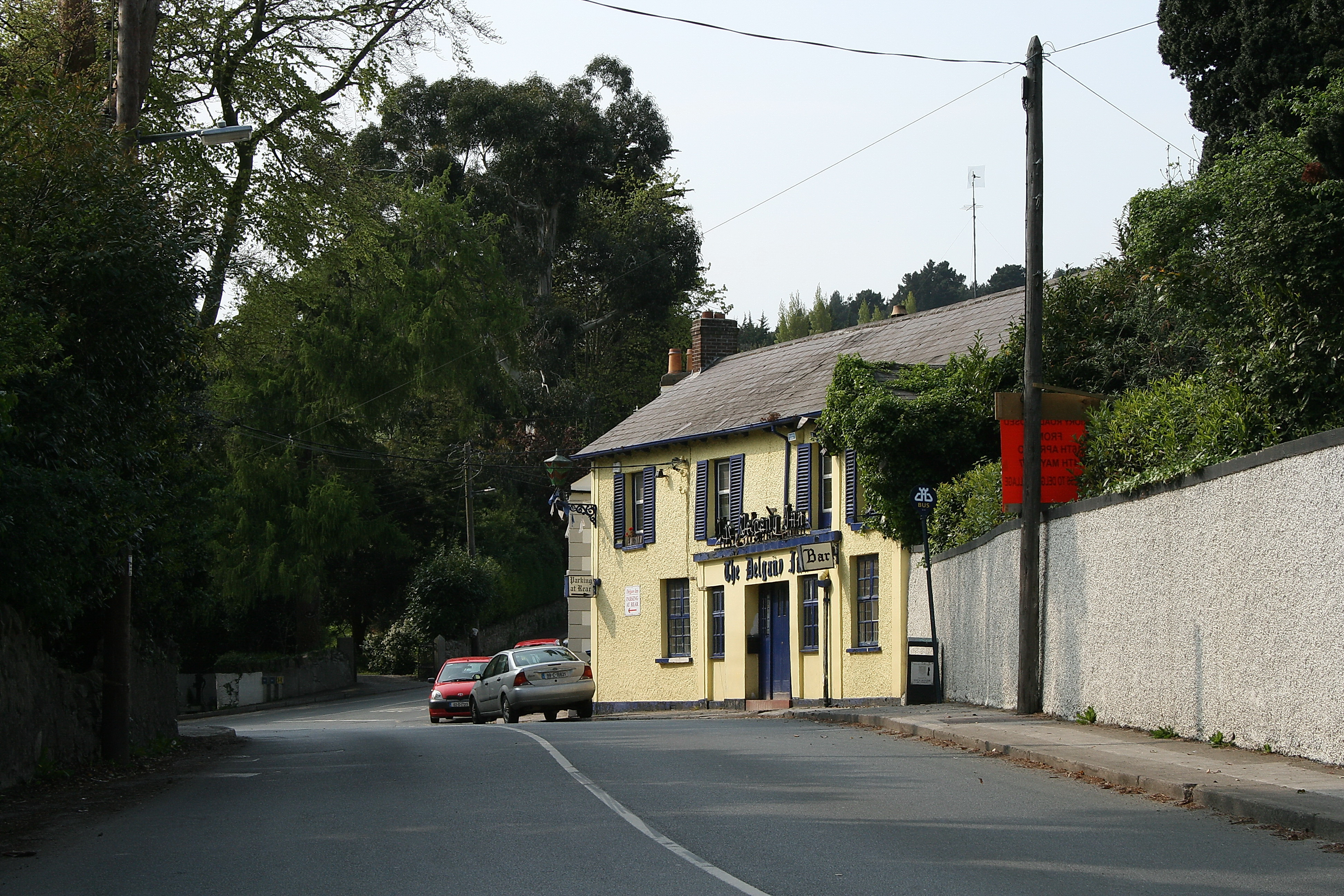
The R762 through Delgany

The route runs east via Rathdown Road, turns south through the town as Church Road before turning west as Mill Road. It again intersects the R761 via a double junction at Delgany and then runs eastwards as Delgany Road and then Glen Road before terminating in the N11 at junction 10 located at the southern end of the Glen of the Downs Nature reserve.

== See also ==
- Roads in Ireland
- National primary road
- National secondary road
