= R761 road (Ireland) =

Road in Ireland

R761 road
- Bóthar R761
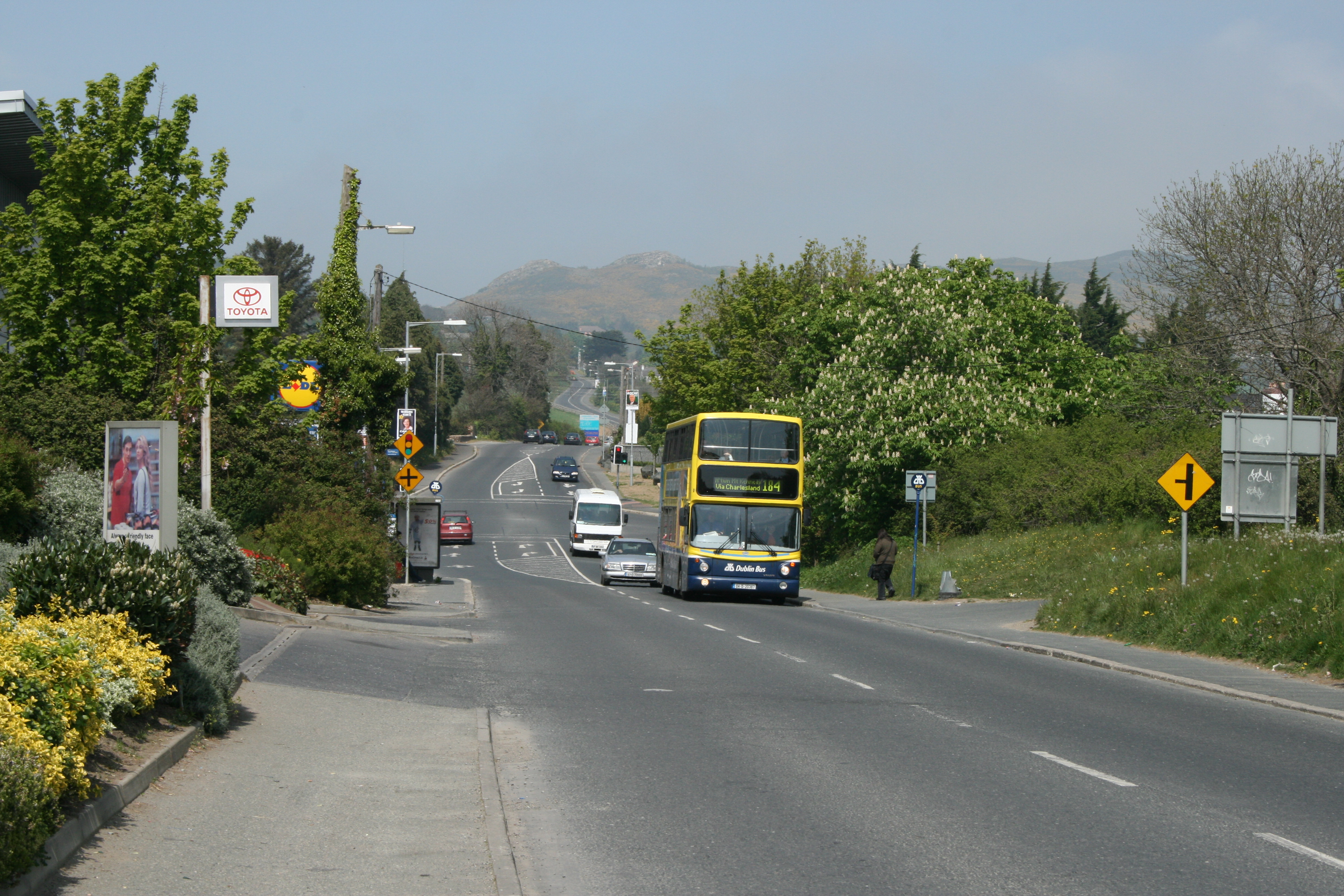
- R761 looking north from Greystones

Route information
- Length: 25 km (16 mi)

Location
- Country: Ireland
- Primary destinations: County Dublin; Start on the Dublin Road, Bray at roundabout junction with M11 and R119; In 200m cross partially into County Wicklow at junction with Old Connaught Road; the county line runs along the middle of the road for a further 200m; County Wicklow; Through Bray via Dublin Road, Castle Street, Bray Bridge (cross River Dargle), Main Street, (R766, R767), Vevay Road, (R766), to roundabout junction with R768, (Bray Southern Cross Road); Cross over Windgap into Greystones – (R762); Killincarrig – (R762); (R774); Kilcoole; Newcastle; Cross the River Vartry; Terminate in Rathnew at the R750

Highway system
- Roads in Ireland; Motorways; Primary; Secondary; Regional

The R761 road is a regional road in County Wicklow (except for the northernmost 200m) in Ireland. From its junction with the M11 and R119 in Bray it takes a southerly route to its junction with the R750 in the village of Rathnew, on the outskirts of Wicklow, where it terminates.

The road is 25 km (16 mi) long. En route it passes through Bray, Greystones, Kilcoole and Newcastle.

== See also ==
- Roads in Ireland
- National primary road
