= R918 road (Ireland) =

Road in Ireland

R918 road
- Bóthar R918

Route information
- Length: 2 km (1.2 mi)

Location
- Country: Ireland
- Primary destinations: County Wicklow; Little Bray; Dargle Road; Fassaore

Highway system
- Roads in Ireland; Motorways; Primary; Secondary; Regional

The R918 road is a regional road in Ireland which connects J6 (Bray Central) of the N11 to the R761 at Little Bray. Most of it is known as the Dargle Road or the Upper Dargle Road.

== Route ==
The route begins at J6 of the N11 and heads west towards Little Bray through Bray's western suburbs. The route passes the Fassaore housing estate and then terminates at its junction with the R761 at Little Bray.
