= Kilmac =

Kilmac may refer to:

- Kilmac Stadium, a football stadium in Dundee, Scotland
- Kilmacanogue, the official name of 'Kilmac', a village in County Wicklow, Ireland
- Kilmacthomas, a town in County Waterford, Ireland (known locally as 'Kilmac')
