= R829 road (Ireland) =

Road in Ireland

R829 road
- Bóthar R829

Route information
- Length: 4.4 km (2.7 mi)

Location
- Country: Ireland
- Primary destinations: Dún Laoghaire–Rathdown; R119 (Monkstown Road); Carrickbrennan Road; Mounttown Upper; Mounttown Lower; Glenageary Road Upper; R118 (Lower Glenageary Road); R118 (Avondale Road); Barnhill Road; R119 (Hyde Road, Dalkey)

Highway system
- Roads in Ireland; Motorways; Primary; Secondary; Regional

The R829 road is a regional road in Dún Laoghaire–Rathdown, Ireland connecting Monkstown and Dalkey.

The official definition of the R829 from the Roads Act 1993 (Classification of Regional Roads) Order 2012 states:

R829: Monkstown - Dalkey, County Dublin

Between its junction with R119 at Monkstown Road and its junction with R119 at Hyde Road Dalkey via Carrickbrennan Road, Mounttown Upper, Mounttown Lower, Glenageary Road Upper and Barnhill Road all in the county of Dún Laoghaire–Rathdown.

The road is 4.4 kilometres (2.7 mi) long.

== See also ==
- Roads in Ireland
- National primary road
- National secondary road
- Regional road
