= Kilpedder =

Village in County Wicklow, Ireland

Kilpedder Irish: Cill Pheadair
- Village
- Kilpedder village centre

- Location in Ireland
- Coordinates: 53°06′49″N 6°06′18″W
- Country: Ireland
- Province: Leinster
- County: County Wicklow
- Elevation: 100 m (330 ft)

Population (2016)
  - Total: 1,255
- Time zone: UTC+0 (WET)
  - Summer (DST): UTC-1 (IST (WEST))
- Irish Grid Reference: O268086

Kilpedder (Irish: Cill Pheadair, meaning "Peter's church") is a village in County Wicklow, Ireland, located off the N11 road between Kilmacanogue and Newtownmountkennedy, just south of the Glen of the Downs Nature Reserve. It had a population of 1,255 as of the 2016 census.

Kilpedder environs include Glenview Park, Kilpedder Grove, Johnstown, Tinnapark, Sunnybank and the Garden Village to the south. Kilpedder is home to two public houses and a petrol station. The army has a rifle range in the area.

== Transport ==
Kilpedder is situated on the main Dublin to Wexford dual carriageway. The Kilpedder interchange, recently constructed, has improved access to Kilpedder and Greystones and cut journey times. A permanent pedestrian bridge linking Kilpedder and Kilquade has also been completed.

The village is served by the 184 Dublin Bus route, which operates every half an hour Monday to Saturday. Bus Éireann route 133 also serves Kilpedder, operating every half an hour on peak and every hour off-peak.

== Church ==
Between the 1850s and the 1940s, Kilpedder was home to a Presbyterian church, however, nothing remains of this church today.

== People ==
In the 20 years between the 1996 and 2016 census, the population of Kilpedder increased from 480 to 1,255 people.

Kilpedder is the birthplace of former footballer Paul McShane.

== See also ==
- List of towns and villages in Ireland
