= R766 road (Ireland) =

Road in Ireland

R766 road
- Bóthar R766
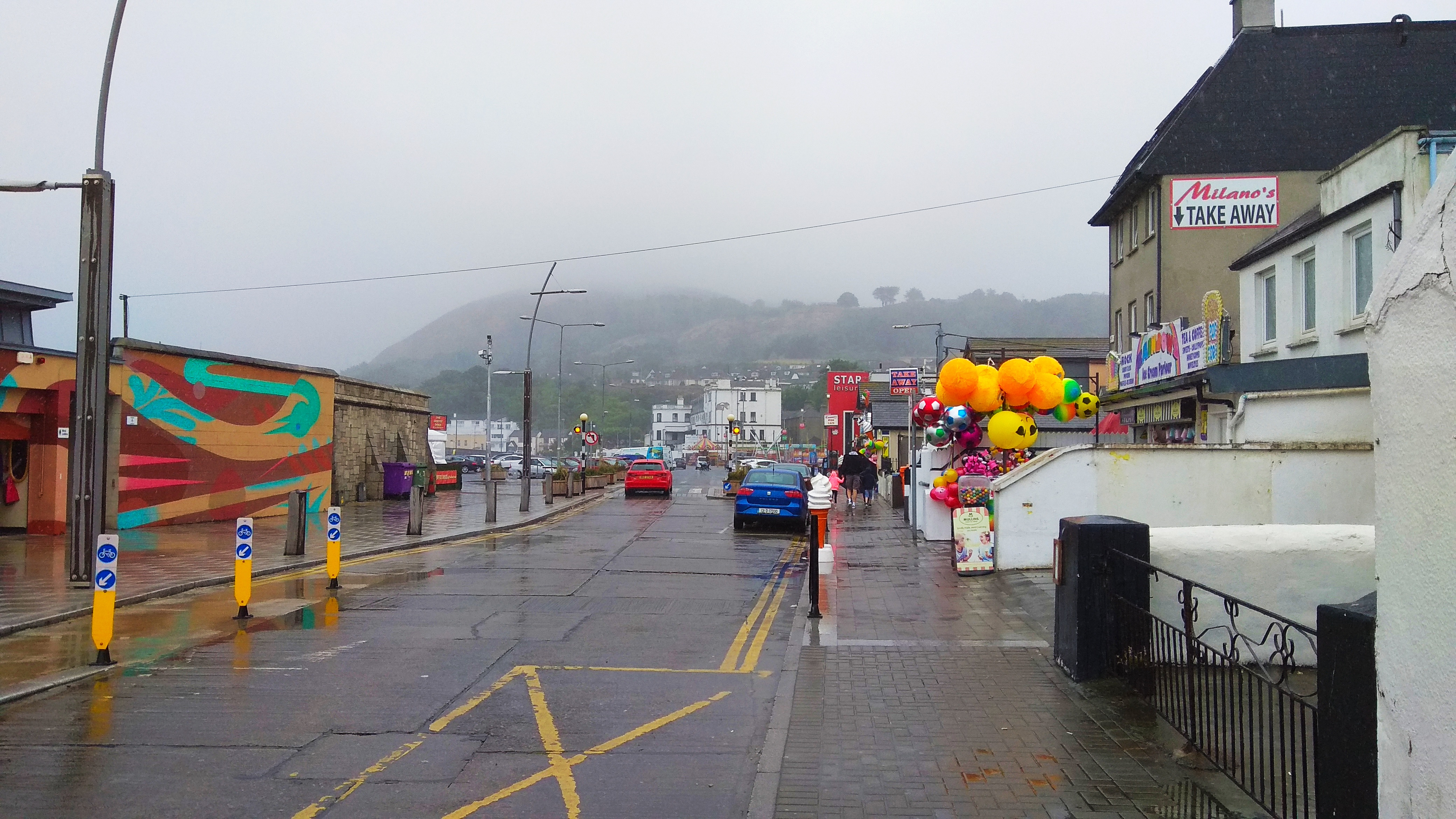
- Strand Road, Bray, on the R766

Route information
- Length: 3.7 km (2.3 mi)

Location
- Country: Ireland
- Primary destinations: County Wicklow; Bray; Quinnsborough Road; Bray Daly Station; Bray Seafront; Meath Road; Putland Road

Highway system
- Roads in Ireland; Motorways; Primary; Secondary; Regional

The R766 road is a regional road in Ireland. The road connects Bray with its eastern suburbs and the seaside.

== Route ==
The route begins at the junction of Bray Main Street and Quinnsborough Road. The route heads east down the Quinnsborough Road, passing the Carlisle Grounds and Bray Daly Station, crossing the level crossing and heading south along the Strand Road. The Strand Road is southbound only so northbound traffic follows the Meath Road instead. The route then heads west up the hill of the Putland Road. The route terminates at its junction with the R761 at The Vevay.

== See also ==
- Roads in Ireland
