= Dean Odlum =

Irish Gaelic footballer

Personal information
- Nickname: The Flour Man
- Born: Newtown, County Wicklow, Ireland

Sport
- Sport: Gaelic football
- Position: Right corner-forward
Club
- Years: Club
- ?-present: Newtown
Club titles
- Wicklow titles: 0
- Leinster titles: 0
- All-Ireland Titles: 0
Inter-county
- Years: County
- 2007-2011 2014-: Wicklow
Inter-county titles
- NFL: 0

Dean Odlum (born in Newtown, County Wicklow) is an Irish sportsperson. He plays Gaelic football with his local club Newtown and has been a member of the Wicklow senior inter-county team since 2007.
