= Oylegate =

Village in County Wexford, Ireland

Oilgate Irish: Bearna na hAille
- Village
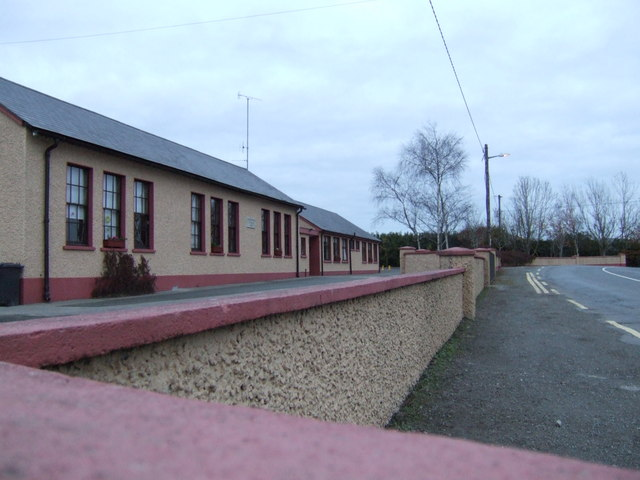
- Oylegate National School

- Location in Ireland
- Coordinates: 52°25′18″N 6°28′00″W
- Country: Ireland
- Province: Leinster
- County: County Wexford

Population (2016)
  - Total: 401

Oilgate or Oylegate (Irish: Bearna na hAille, meaning 'the gap in the cliff'), also known previously as Mullinagore (Irish: Maolán na nGabhar, meaning 'the grazing of the goats'), is a small village in Ireland, located about halfway between Wexford and Enniscorthy towns, in County Wexford. It had a population of 401 as of the 2022 census, up from 358 in the 2016 census.

== Name ==
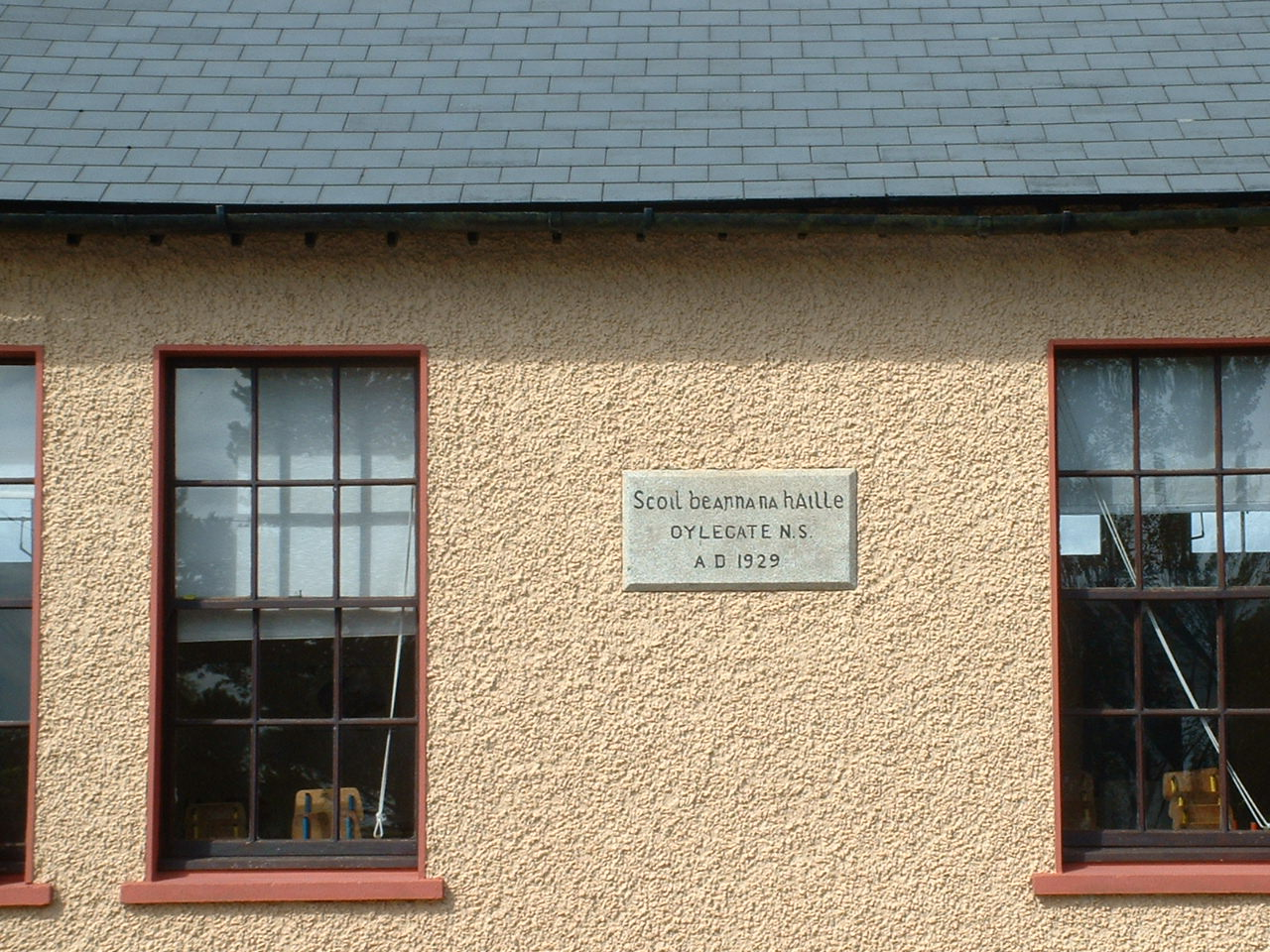
Plaque on the wall of Oylegate National School (Scoil Náisiúnta Bearna na hAille) showing the generally accepted local spelling

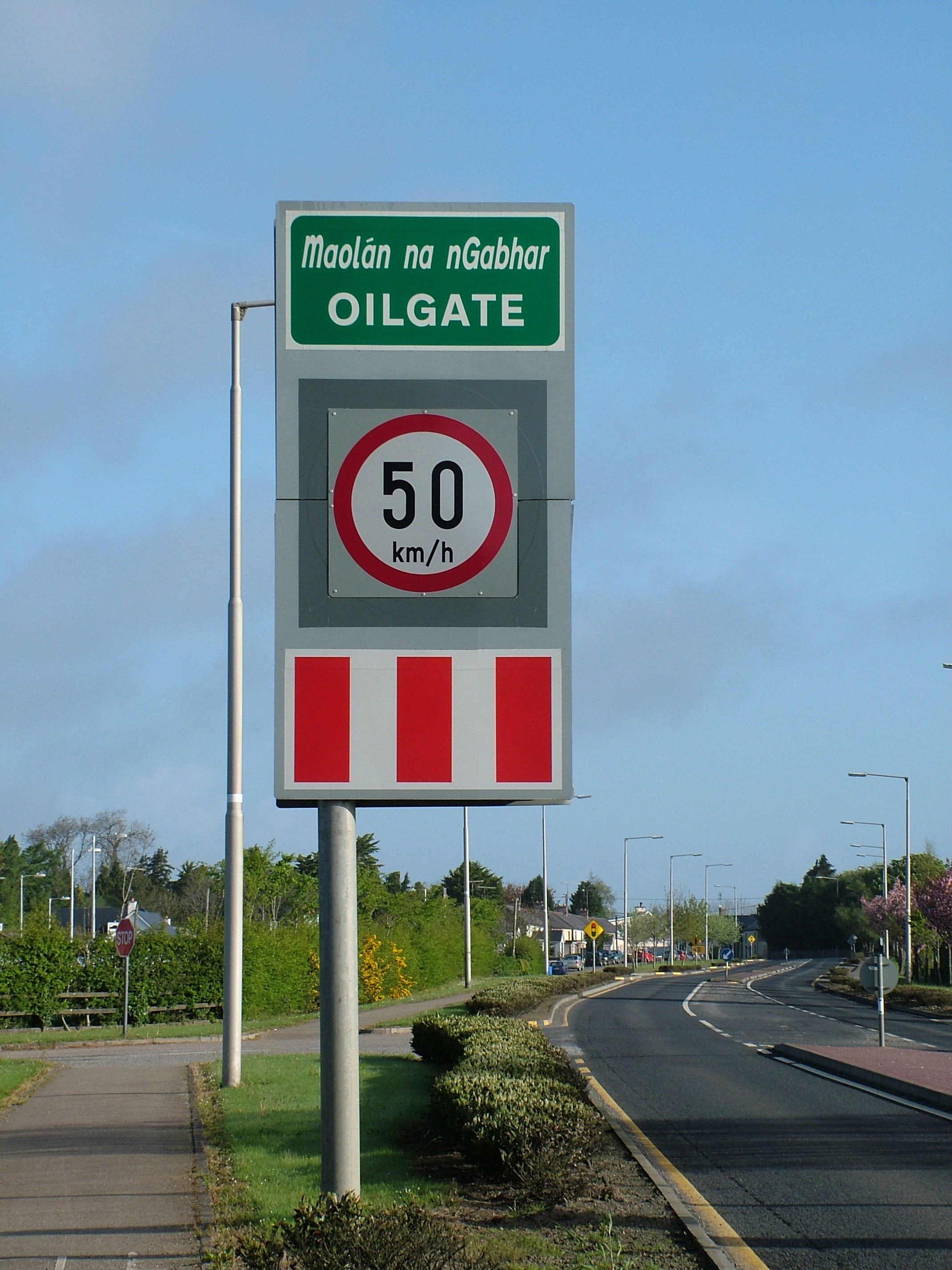
Road sign leading into Oilgate, showing official spelling

The name is usually officially spelt as 'Oilgate' and this spelling can be found on road signs entering the village and is the official spelling used on maps and by the Central Statistics Office. However, the spelling 'Oylegate' is found on a plaque on the wall of the village national school dated 1929, and many locals spell it as such.

The Irish name for Oylegate is Bearna na hAille, bearna meaning gap or gate and aill meaning cliff, getting its name from the place that the river Slaney breaks through the gap in the cliffs or rocks on its way to Wexford harbour. It would appear that the name Oylegate became anglicised over time and got its name by saying aill quickly (oila) and gate from the English translation of bearna, gap or gate.

Oylegate is also referred to as Maolán na nGabhar which is the Irish name for Mullinagore, getting its name from an area of land where goats used to graze. This reference is likely because there is no actual townland recorded as Oylegate, and the townland of Mullinagore would have been the more central part of the village consisting of the local church, the old school and a small settlement of houses. The Electoral District (E.D) of Edermine covers all of Oylegate, parts of Glenbrien with Ballyhuskard covering all the remaining townlands (except for Ballycourcy more which is in the E.D of Enniscorthy Rural).

== Community and amenities ==
The village's patron saint is Saint David, after whom the local Roman Catholic church is named. It has an adjoining cemetery. There is a holy well and shrine named Saint David's in nearby Ballinaslaney. A village approximately 5 kilometres northeast called Glenbrien is the half parish of Oylegate.

The village has a national (primary) school, two public houses, a combined post office/shop, a petrol station, a Garda (police) station and a small retail park.

== Sport ==
Gaelic games (hurling, camogie, Gaelic football) are played in the local Gaelic Athletic Association complex, home to the Oylegate-Glenbrien teams. Hurler and club member Pat Nolan played for Wexford as goalkeeper during the 1950s, 1960s and 1970s, and won three All-Ireland medals with the county. Nolan also helped the Oylegate-Glenbrien club win their sole Wexford Senior Hurling Championship title in 1963.

== Transport ==
The village is served by Wexford Bus routes 376, 740 and 740x, which provide connections with Dublin Airport, Dublin, Gorey, Enniscorthy, Bunclody, Carlow and Wexford. Bus Éireann operates route 2, which provides connections with Dublin Airport, Dublin, Arklow, Gorey, Enniscorthy and Wexford.

The N11 national road, which runs between Dublin and Wexford, passes through the village, and is also part of European route E1. The southern end of the M11 motorway can be found to the north of the village at Scurlocksbush. It has been proposed that the village be bypassed as part of the N11/N25 Oilgate to Rosslare Harbour Scheme. As of 2024, planning applications for this scheme were due to be submitted in "Q3 2026 (subject to receiving the necessary approvals and the availability of funding)".

== See also ==
- List of towns and villages in Ireland
