= Glen of the Downs =

Nature reserve in glacial valley in Ireland

- Gleann dá Ghrua
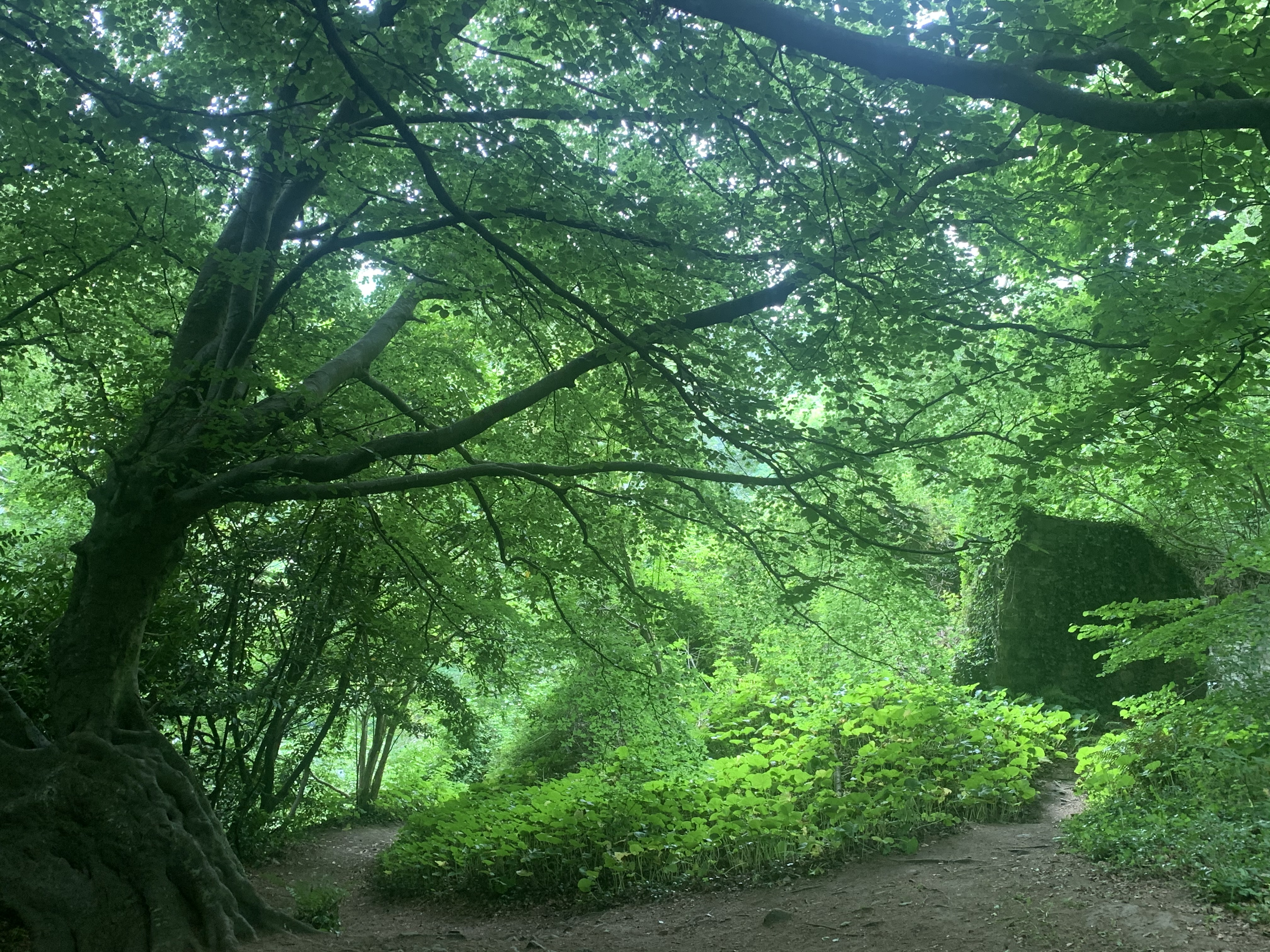

- Location within Ireland
- Location: County Wicklow, Ireland
- Coordinates: 53°07′58″N 6°06′48″W
- Area: 146 acres (59 ha)
- Designation: SAC; Nature Reserve
- Governing body: National Parks and Wildlife Service

The Glen of the Downs (Irish: Gleann dá Ghrua, meaning 'The Valley of the Two Brows') is a 2 km long wooded glacial valley with steep sides rising to almost 250m on the east coast of Ireland. It contains a designated Nature Reserve comprising 59 ha, and is a Special Area of Conservation (SAC).

== Location ==
The Glen is located in North County Wicklow. It is south of the capital Dublin in County Wicklow and lies between the villages of Kilmacanogue to the North and Kilpedder to the South. From the Northern end both the Great Sugar Loaf and Little Sugar Loaf hills are visible. The village of Delgany is less than 2 km to the East.

The N11, a National Primary Route and part of European route E01, passes along the floor of the Glen as a dual carriageway between Junctions 9 and 10. The upgrade to this road, completed in 2003, was delayed by protesters opposed on environmental grounds.

== Geography ==
The valley was formed by the meltwater from a massive ice sheet. The rocks forming the sides of are the same quartzite of the two Sugarloaf hills to the north. The Three Trouts River, actually a stream, flows from the Great Sugarloaf (three sources), down through the wooded Glen from north to south before turning sharply East through Delgany village, forming a smaller glen (Glenowen or Glen na hAbhainn), on through Farrenkelly and Charlesland floodplains / reclaimed marshes, and entering the sea at Greystones South Beach, Greystones. The River receives numerous tributaries and springs along the way, from both sides, including the Brown Trouts Stream and Delgany (Monastery) Stream in Delgany Village. While the river often seasonally runs dry (overground) through the Glen nature reserve (by the N11 car park), the springs immediately downstream mean that it has never run dry through the bottom of the nature reserve and downstream. Because of its small size, and isolation, the nature reserve is completely dependent on surrounding wooded hills and agricultural glens, currently unprotected, and linked mainly by the narrow streams and hedges.

== Nature ==
The tree canopy is made up of broadleaf trees such as oak, cherry, rowan and ash. Beneath this canopy grows bilberry, bramble, wild garlic, holly, honeysuckle, ivy, woodrush and wood sage.

Birds include blackbird, blackcap, chaffinch, jay, robin, sparrowhawk, blue tit, great tit, grey wagtail, woodpecker, dipper, owl, buzzard, and wren. Sightings of kites are increasing. Some years, the rare wood warbler visits. Red squirrels are common as are sika deer, fox, otter, pine marten, hedgehog, and badger.

== History ==
The Glen has been written about since Victorian times with the view from the nearby Bellevue House described as 'a scene of luxurious softness, combined with grandeur and significance'. Bellevue House was the home of the La Touche family who settled in Ireland as Huguenot refugees. Originally from England, their name derives from the La Touche commune in France.

== Gallery ==
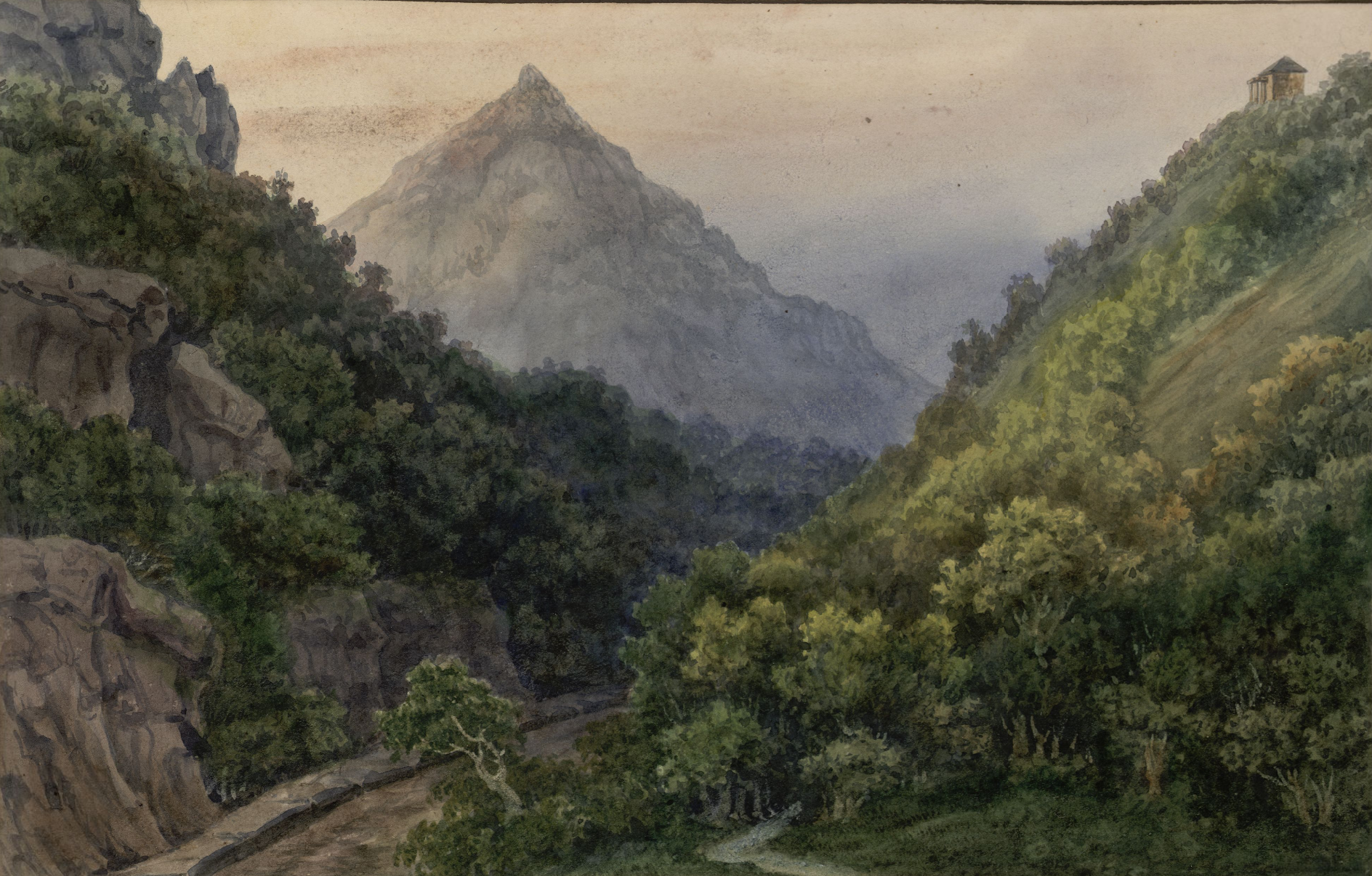
19th century painting of Glen of the Downs by French artist Alphonse Dousseau

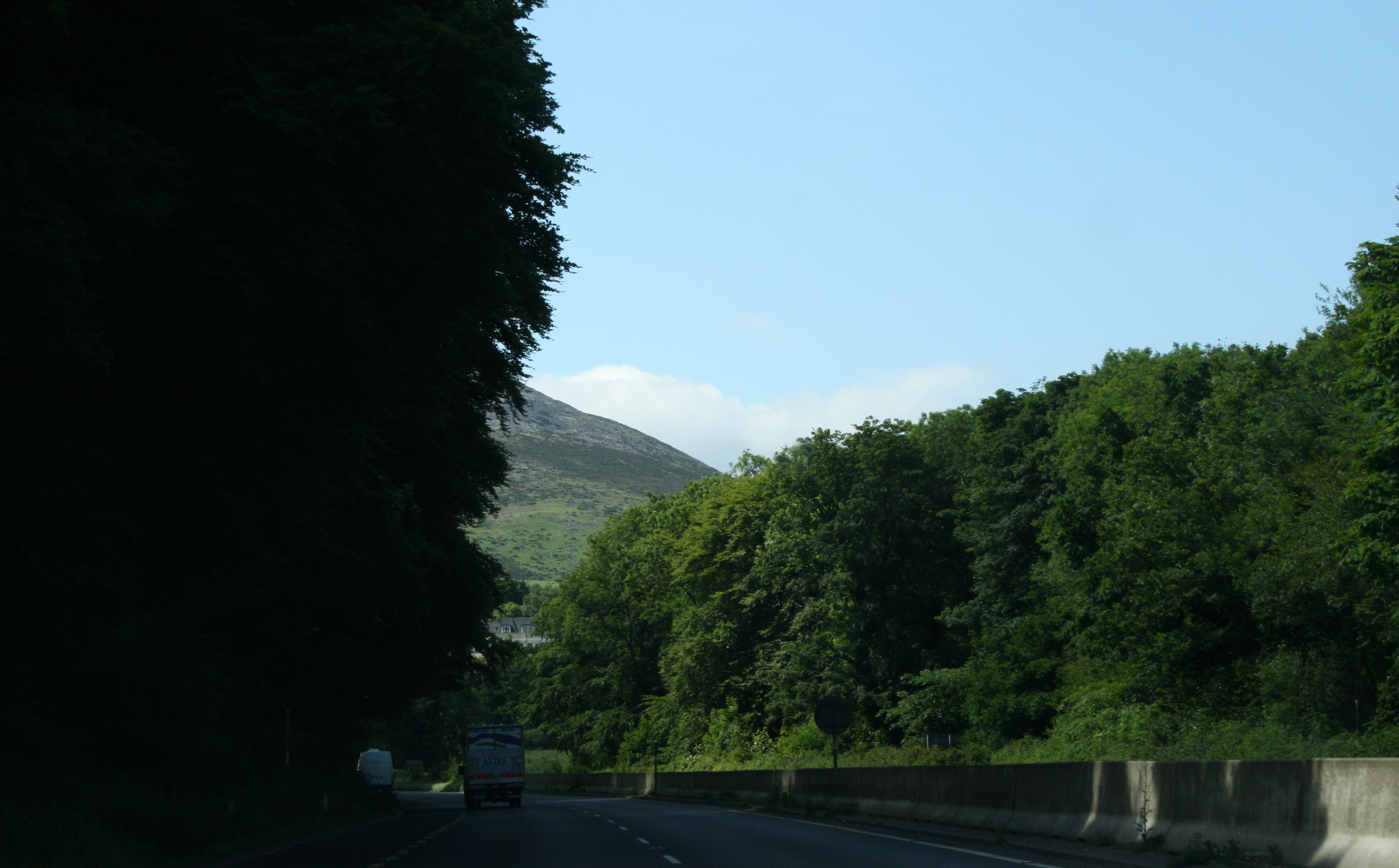
The N11 road cutting through the valley
