= R750 road (Ireland) =

Road in Ireland

Coordinates: 52°49′07″N 6°07′40″W

R750 road
- Bóthar R750
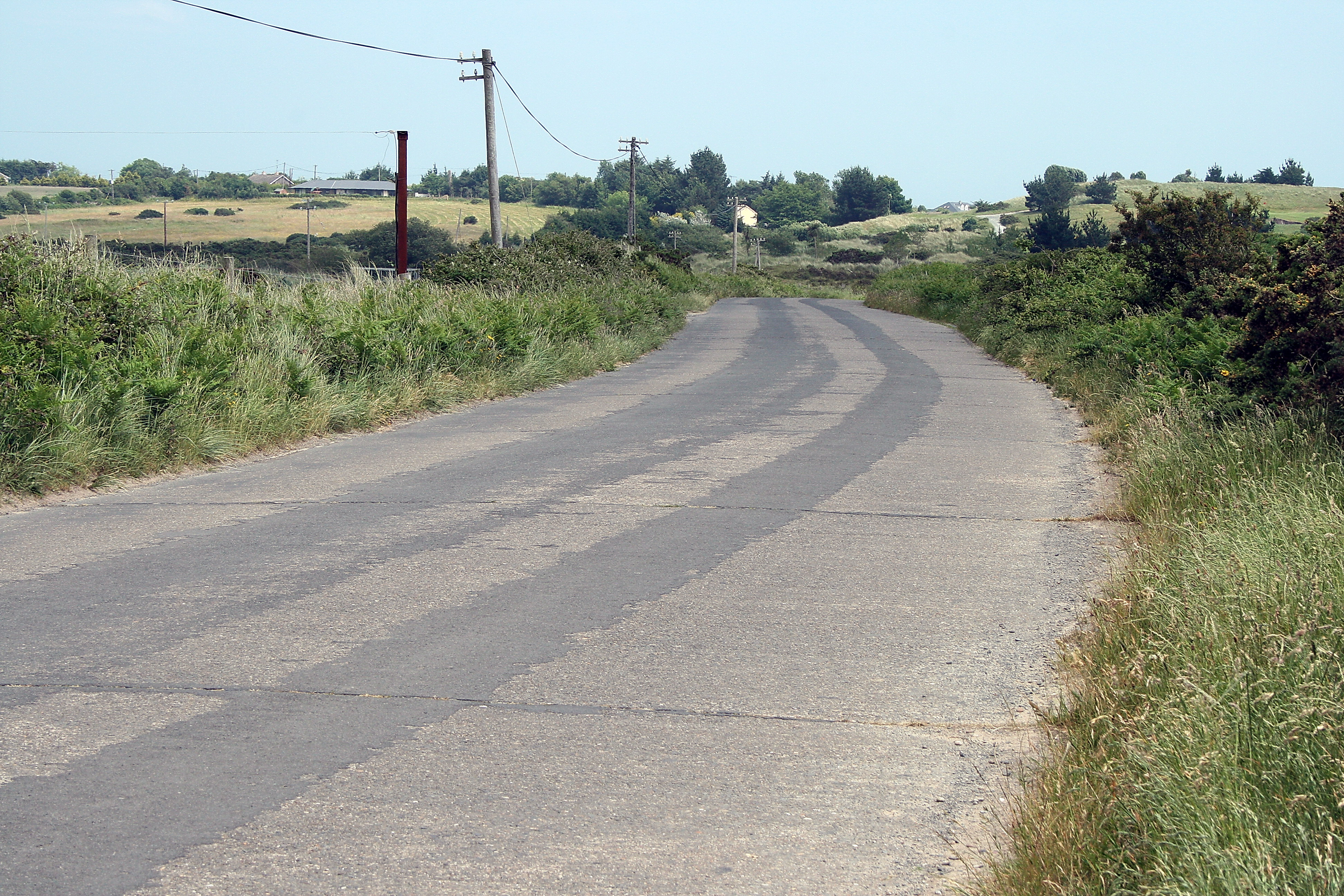
- R750 near Brittas Bay

Route information
- Length: 30 km (19 mi)

Location
- Country: Ireland
- Primary destinations: County Wicklow; Rathnew leave the R772; Wicklow – (R751); Passes Wicklow Head; Passes the Silver Strand; Brittas Bay – R773; Passes Mizen Head; Arklow joins the R772 at Ferrybank

Highway system
- Roads in Ireland; Motorways; Primary; Secondary; Regional

The R750 road is a regional road in County Wicklow, Ireland. From its junction with the R772 in Rathnew on the outskirts of Wicklow Town it takes a generally southerly route to its junction with the R772 in Ferrybank, Arklow, where it terminates.

An unusual feature of the road (apart from the complete absence of road markings) is a section of several kilometres with a concrete surface south of Brittas Bay.

The road is 30 km (19 mi) long. En route it stays close to the coast passing many popular beaches, notably at Brittas Bay.

== See also ==
- Roads in Ireland
