= R751 road (Ireland) =

Road in Ireland

Coordinates: 52.967242°N 6.062382°W

R751 road
- Bóthar R751
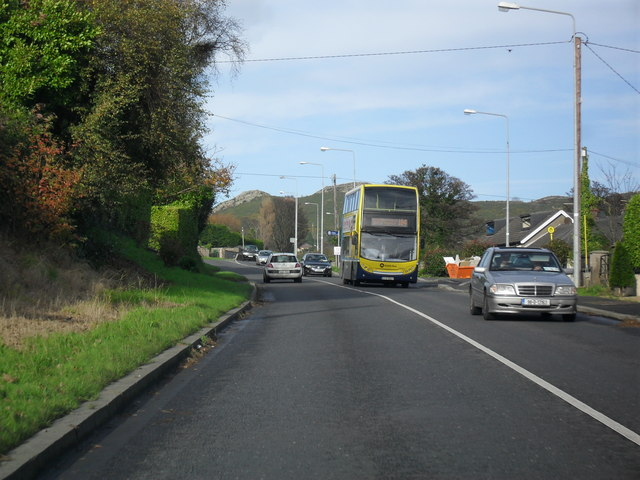
- R751

Route information
- Length: 5.2 km (3.2 mi)

Location
- Country: Ireland

Highway system
- Roads in Ireland; Motorways; Primary; Secondary; Regional

The R751 road is a regional road in County Wicklow, Ireland.

== See also ==
- Roads in Ireland

== Sources ==
- Roads Act 1993 (Classification of Regional Roads) Order 2006 – Department of Transport
