= Newcastle Aerodrome =

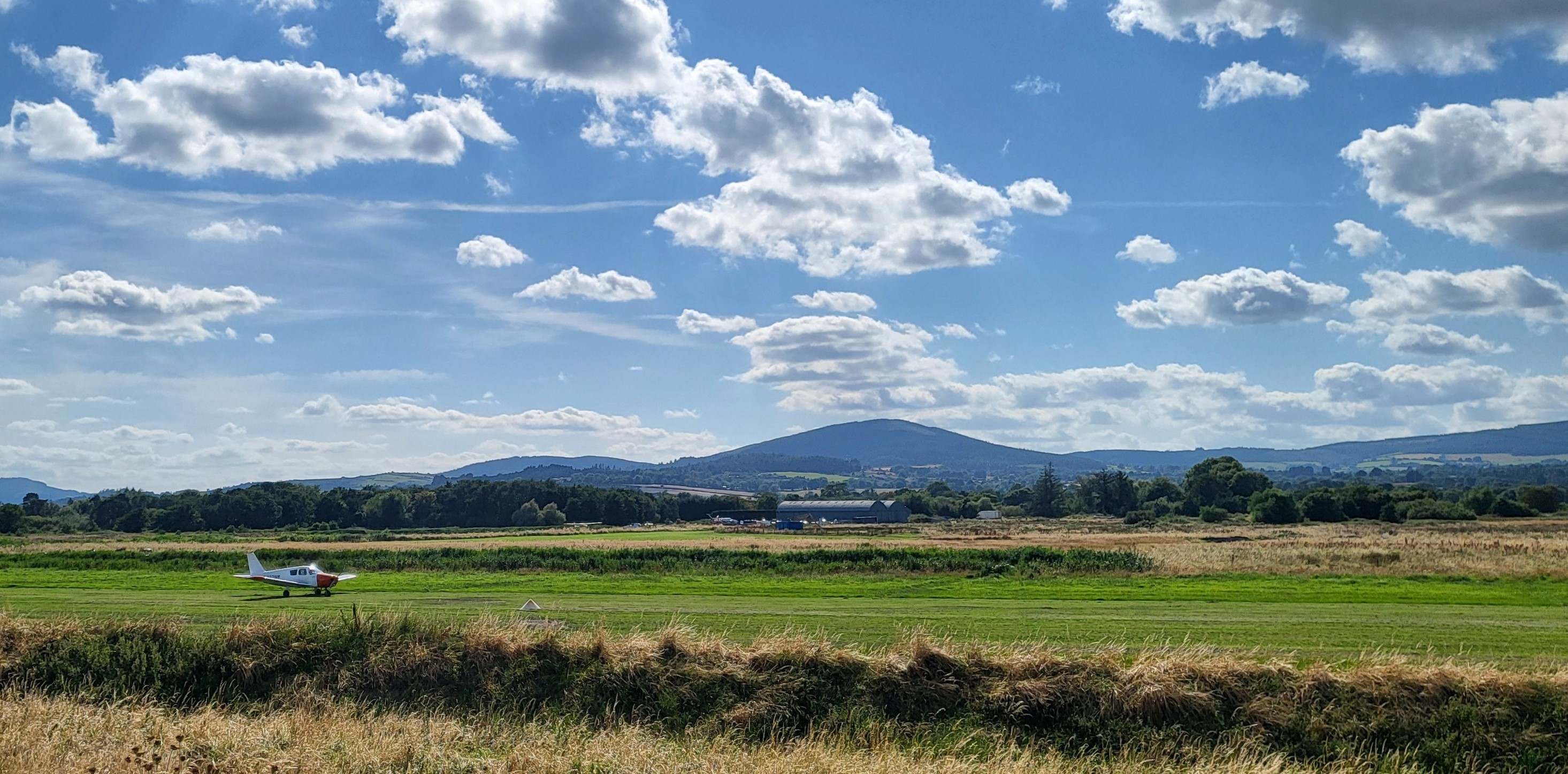
- IATA: none; ICAO: EINC

Summary
- Operator: John Nugent
- Location: Newcastle, County Wicklow, Ireland
- Elevation AMSL: 1 ft / 0.3 m
- Coordinates: 53°04′23″N 006°02′23″W

Map
- Location of airport in Ireland

Runways
Direction	Length		Surface
Direction	m	ft	Surface
18/36	690	2,264	Grass
- Source: Ireland AIS

Newcastle Aerodrome (ICAO: EINC) is located on Sea Road in Newcastle, a village in County Wicklow, Ireland. This aerodrome is licensed by the Aeronautical Services Department of the Irish Aviation Authority.

== Facilities ==
Newcastle Aerodrome sits at an elevation of 1 foot (0.3 m) above mean sea level. It has one runway designated 18/36 with a grass surface measuring 690 by 18 metres (2,264 by 59 ft).
