= Newcastle, County Wicklow =

Village in County Wicklow, Ireland

Newcastle Irish: An Caisleán Nua
- Village
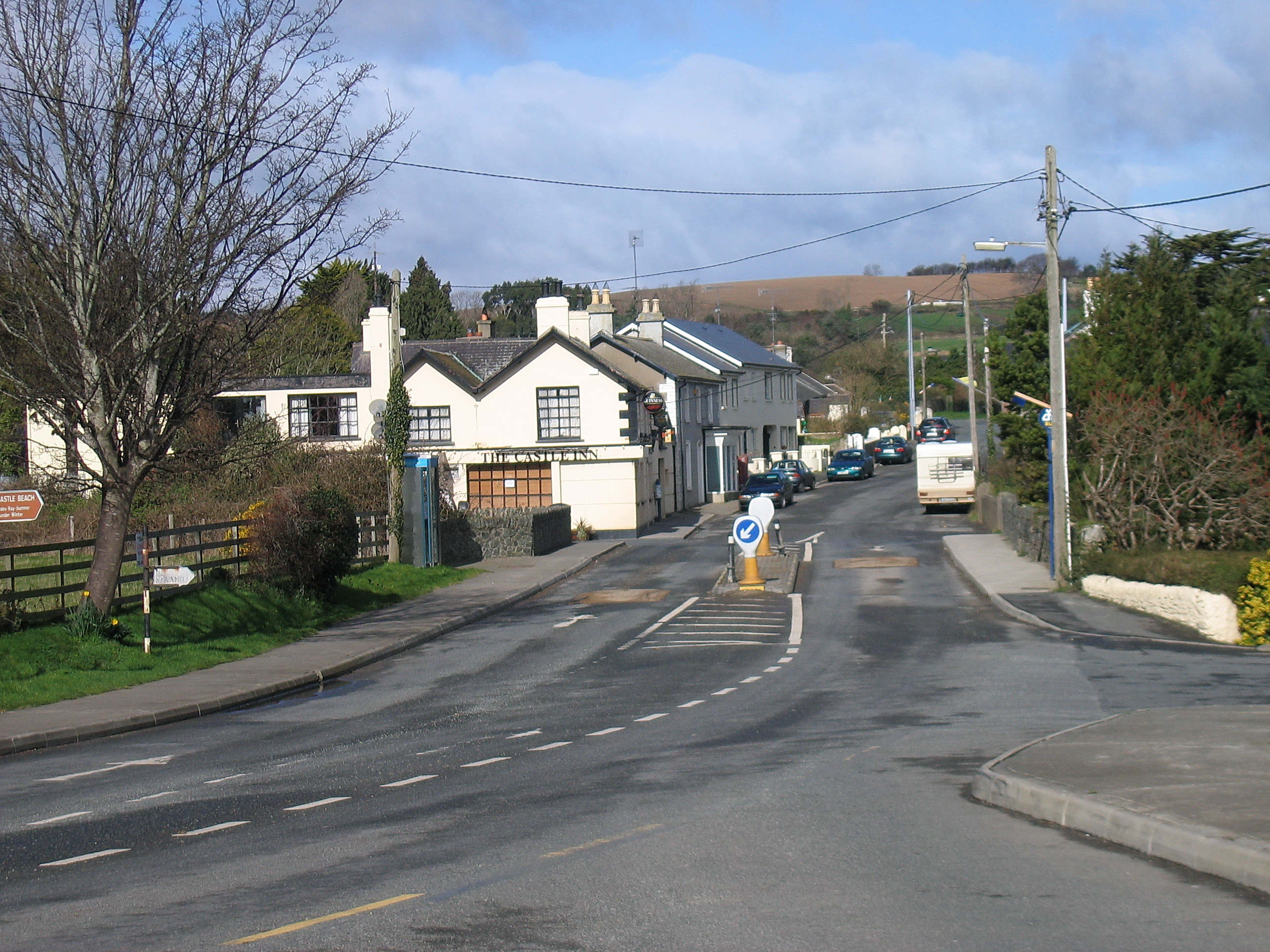
- The village of Newcastle

- Location in Ireland
- Coordinates: 53°04′09″N 6°03′44″W
- Country: Ireland
- Province: Leinster
- County: County Wicklow
- Elevation: 50 m (160 ft)

Population (2016)
  - Total: 924
- Time zone: UTC+0 (WET)
  - Summer (DST): UTC-1 (IST (WEST))
- Irish Grid Reference: O296038

Newcastle (Irish: An Caisleán Nua) is a village in County Wicklow, Ireland. It is situated on the R761 and is about 45 km (28 mi) south of Dublin city. Newcastle had a population of 924 as of the 2016 census. The ancient barony of Newcastle, which surrounds the village, takes its name from the village and its Norman castle.

== History ==
The village is half a mile from the castle and church where it was originally located. Newcastle takes its name from the castle, built by the Normans on an earlier Irish fortification in the territory of the Duffy's (Peter & Leah).

It was constructed between 1177 and 1184 by Hugh de Lacy, Lord of Meath. The castle, called Newcastle Mackynegan, became a major stronghold in the outer fortifications of the Pale. Even so, it was attacked and occupied at intervals by the Wicklow Irish chieftains, the O'Tooles and the O'Byrnes. The current ruin on the site is not that of the castle, which was destroyed in the 16th century, but of a building which was erected on the site. The castle was the administrative centre of the area until the shiring of Wicklow in the 16th century. The county seat then moved to Wicklow town after the castle was again raided.

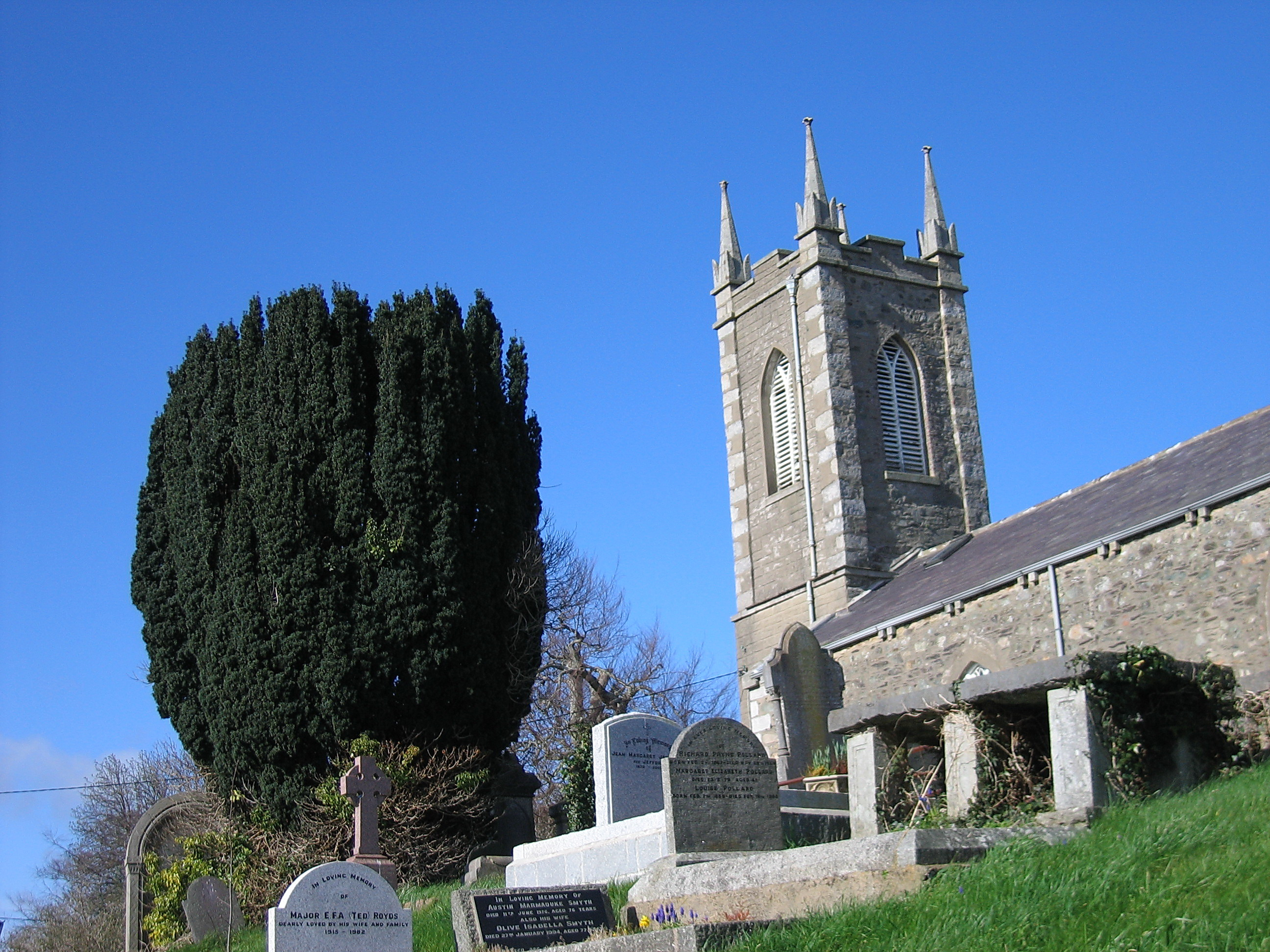
Newcastle Church of Ireland

The church is located a few hundred feet from the castle and some parts of the building date from the 12th Century. This church is named as a prebend as early as 1227. In 1467 it was assigned by Archbishop Michael Tregury to the Archdeacon of Glendalough. The present church was built between 1783 and 1788, with its tower being constructed in 1821. In 1872, the Archdeacon of Glendalough ceased to have a place in the Chapter, as such, and the separate prebend of Newcastle was revived. The church, which is owned by the Church of Ireland (Anglicans), was also used as the local Catholic church for services in 2000 when it was agreed to share it until the catholic oratory was rebuilt. The local primary school, St Francis's, is located beside the church. There is a ruin of a Catholic church about 2 miles (3.2 km) from the village with a graveyard.

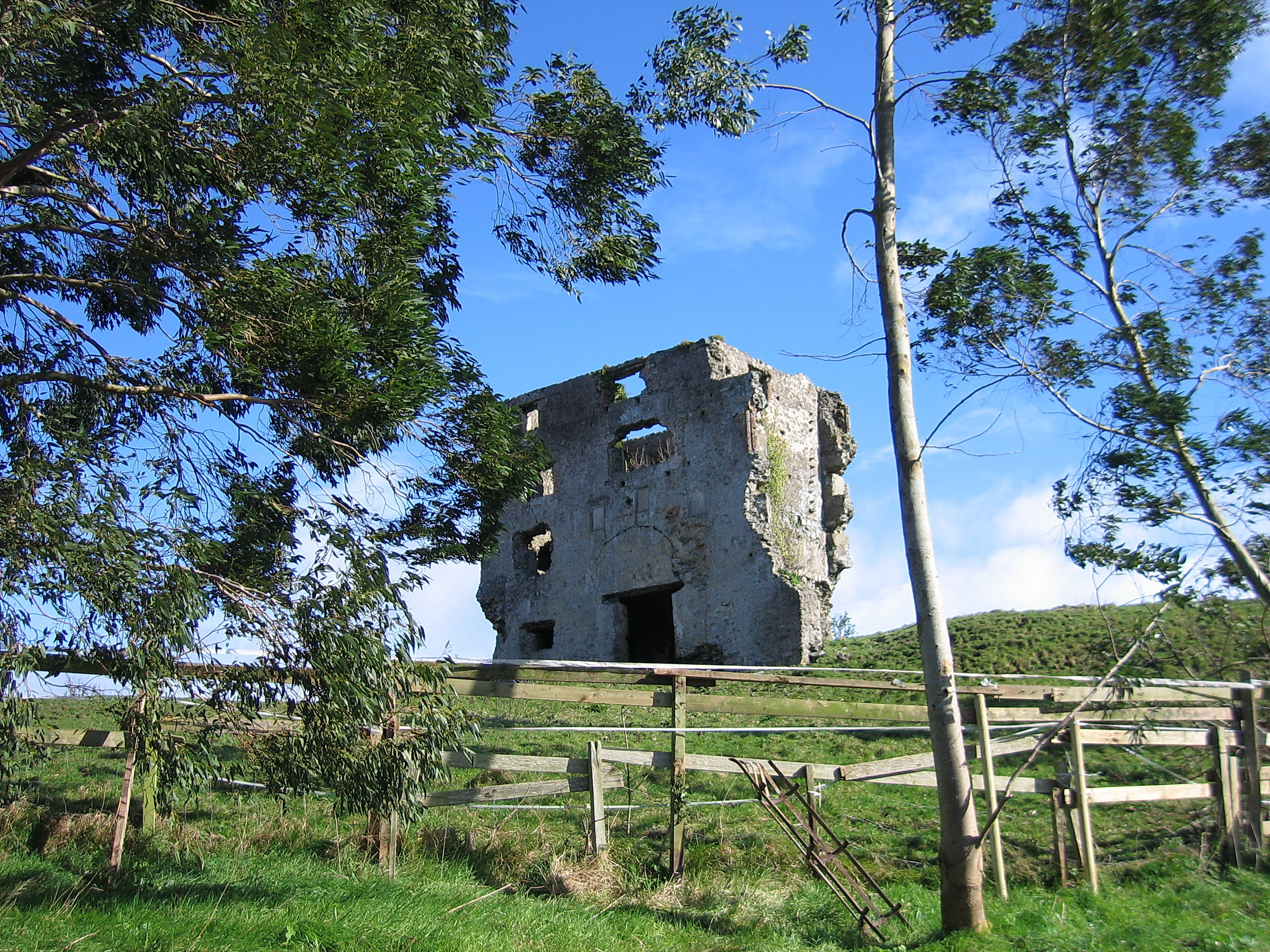
Ruin of Fortified House

Newcastle is in the Roman Catholic parish of Kilquade, and the parish church is located in Kilquade about 4 km (2.5 mi) north of the village. A new oratory was built in the village in 2009, replacing an earlier temporary structure.

== Local recreation ==
In 1983, a community centre was built in Newcastle to provide space for sporting and recreational activities. Local organisations include the local Gaelic Athletic Association club, indoor soccer, bowls, badminton, tennis and croquet clubs. Newcastle is close to the beach, which is used for swimming, walking and shore angling.

There is one pub, The Castle Inn (previously the Bridge Inn), which was rebuilt in 2008. There is also a shop/garage.

Close by is Blackditch Wood, an 89-hectare (220 acre) priority woodland and wetland Nature Reserve established by Birdwatch Ireland in 2002 and classified as a special protection area. The project created a large wetland complex for the protection of Annex 1 birds threatened within the European Union. The reserve comprises a variety of habitats, including pure birch forest, fen and willow scrub, natural grasslands, a conifer plantation, 8 km (5.0 mi) of drainage ditches and farmland for grazing and crop planting, attracting a wildlife diversity, protecting threatened bird, flora and insect species. A series of walkways and hides allows access by the public for birdwatching.

== Transport ==
Go Ahead Ireland operates route L2 between Newcastle and Bray. Dublin Bus operates the peak-time only X2 route between Newcastle and Hawkins Street via University College Dublin.

A railway station opened in Newcastle in August 1856 and was closed on 30 March 1964.

Newcastle Aerodrome is just outside Newcastle.

== People ==
- Barry Corr, football player.
- Hozier, musician

== See also ==
- List of towns and villages in Ireland
