= Kilmacanogue =

Village in County Wicklow, Ireland

Kilmacanoge Irish: Cill Mocheanóg
- Village
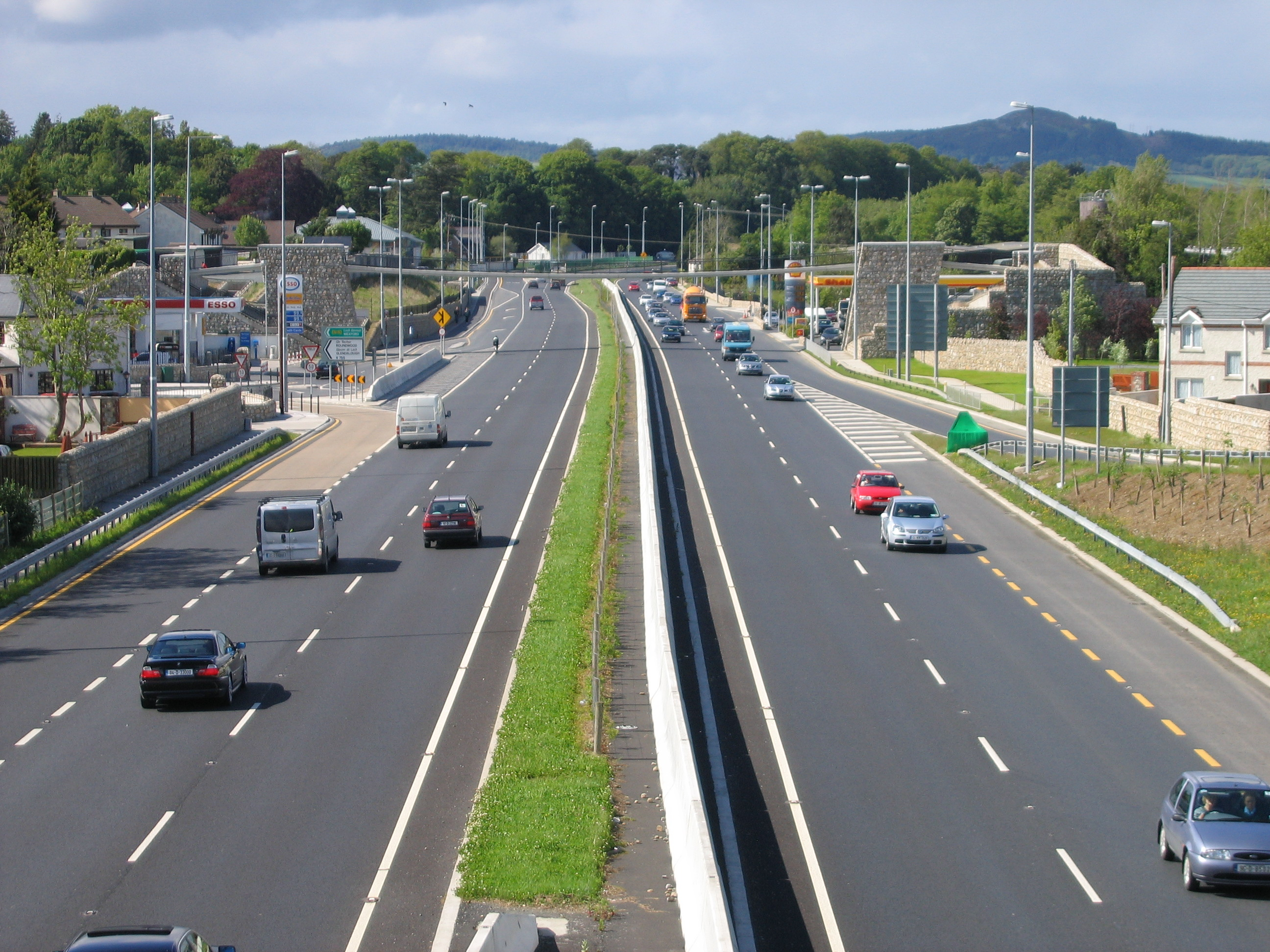
- Kilmacanogue on the N11 road

- Location in Ireland
- Coordinates: 53°10′05″N 6°08′17″W
- Country: Ireland
- Province: Leinster
- County: County Wicklow
- Elevation: 80 m (260 ft)

Population (2022)
  - Total: 1,240
- Irish Grid Reference: O243148
- Kilmacanoge is the official spelling.

Kilmacanogue, officially Kilmacanoge (Irish: Cill Mocheanóg, meaning 'Mocheanóg's church'), is a village in north County Wicklow, Ireland. It is southwest of Bray and is overlooked by Great Sugar Loaf mountain.

== Location ==
The village lies between the Little Sugar Loaf to the east and the Great Sugar Loaf to the west in the northeastern foothills of the Wicklow Mountains, near the Glen of the Downs.

Two small streams join in Kilmacanogue, behind the old Post Office (Donnelly's), to form the Kilmacanogue River, which flows into the River Dargle near the old "Silver Bridge" at Kilbride, approximately two miles to the north, just downstream of the confluence with the Cookstown River.

== History ==
The village is named after Saint Mocheanog, a companion of Saint Patrick. According to legend, he baptised the Children of Lir just before their death.

For much off the 1600s to the 1800s the village and surrounding area were heavily influenced by the nearby Powerscort Estate. Many tenants paid rent directly to the Powerscort Family. They built a smaller dower house here, Wingfeild Houes witch today is the Woodland Academy

Glencormac House was a 2 story, red brick victorican era house built between 1877 and 1878 for the distiller James Jameson. In 1958 the house was converted into a hotel. It Hosted many celebritys like Elizabeth Taylor, Princess Grace of Monaco and Georgre Peppard.The Building burnt down in 1967 and today , Avoca Handweavers is on the grounds

On the morning of 1 January 1942, the German Luftwaffe dropped two magnetic mines near Kilmacanogue but they did not explode. In 1958 West Germany paid over £300,000 in compensation

== Amenities ==
The village has two petrol stations, a primary school, a church, and an old coaching house dating back to the 19th century.

The Plucks family, residents in the 19th and early 20th centuries, operated the coaching house where horses were changed on the route south to Wicklow. Charles Stewart Parnell was a frequent passenger on his way to his family house in Avondale – hence his moniker "The Blackbird of Avondale" – a ballad sung in his memory. It was not until 1861 that the railway was opened as far as Rathdrum, hence the need to travel by coach up to that time.

The northern end of the village is home to a flagship Avoca retail and food destination. Situated on the grounds of the former Glencormac House—originally built in 1860 by the Jameson whiskey family—the site now features expansive gardens, a food market, a table-service restaurant, and retail spaces.. The house became a hotel (Grade A, a precursor to five-star rated hotels) in the 1950s, but was razed to the ground in a fire that occurred in 1967.

In 2016 a park was opened in the centre of the village to commemorate the 100 year anniversary of the 1916 Easter Rising

== Transport ==
=== Road ===
The village lies on the junction of the R755 road to Roundwood and the N11 road, 5 km (3.1 mi) southeast of Bray town centre..

=== Bus ===
Kilmacanogue is served by the 45A/B bus to Dún Laoghaire via Bray, Shankill, and Ballybrack.

Until 2014, it was served by Dublin Bus route 145 to Heuston Station; however, this was cut short to terminate in Ballywaltrim and the 45A route was extended to serve Kilmacanogue. Only a small number of route 145 journeys still continue to Kilmacanogue on weekdays.

The village is also served by Bus Éireann routes 131 (to Wicklow and Bray), and 133 (to Wicklow and Dublin Busáras), as well as St. Kevin's Bus route 181 to Dublin and Glendalough (via Roundwood & Laragh), and Wexford Bus routes 740 to Wexford (via Arklow, Gorey, and Enniscorthy), 740A to Gorey via Arklow and Wicklow, 740X to Wexford, and the once a day UM11 to Maynooth University (via Leixlip).

== Clubs and organisations ==
Kilmacanogue is home to the Kilmacanogue GAA Club, a Scouting Ireland group, Kilmac Drama, Kilmacanogue History Society, and Glencormac United Football Club.

== Notable people ==
- Mary Coughlan (born 1956), an Irish blues singer, was living in Kilmacanogue as at January 2021. According to reports, her home was burgled, and the culprit was sentenced to six years in prison.
- Mariella Frostrup (born 1962), British TV and radio personality, grew up in the area from 1969 to 1977.
- Cathy Henderson (1963–2014), Irish artist, lived in the village from the early 1990s
- Christopher Juul-Jensen (born 1989), International/Danish pro cycklist was born here.
- Jack Conan (born 1992) Irish Rugby Union player who has made 62 caps for the Irish National team attended school and played for local sports teams here.
- Shay Elliot (1934 -1971) Irish road bicycle racer who was the first Irish person to ride in the Tour de France. He was buried here alongside his father in 1971. In 1998 when the tour came to Ireland a wreath was laid at his grave

== See also ==
- List of towns and villages in Ireland
