= Brittas Bay =

Bay in Count Wicklow, Ireland

Coordinates: 52°53′N 6°03′W

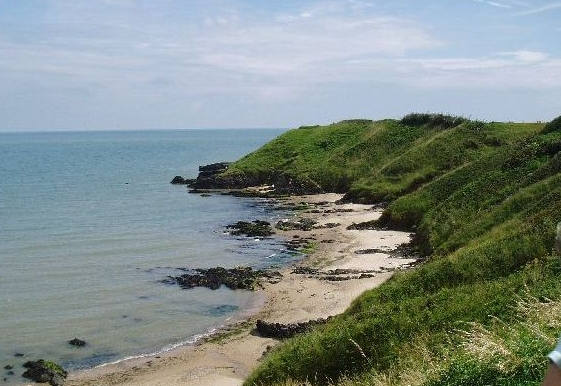
Cornagower East, Brittas Bay

Brittas Bay (Irish: Cuan an Bhriotáis) in County Wicklow, Ireland is a 4 kilometres (2.5 mi) stretch of beach on the Irish Sea coast, about 12 kilometres (7.5 mi) south of Wicklow. The beach and associated dunes are very popular with Dubliners and are one of the most frequented beaches by residents of the capital during the summer.

== Geography ==
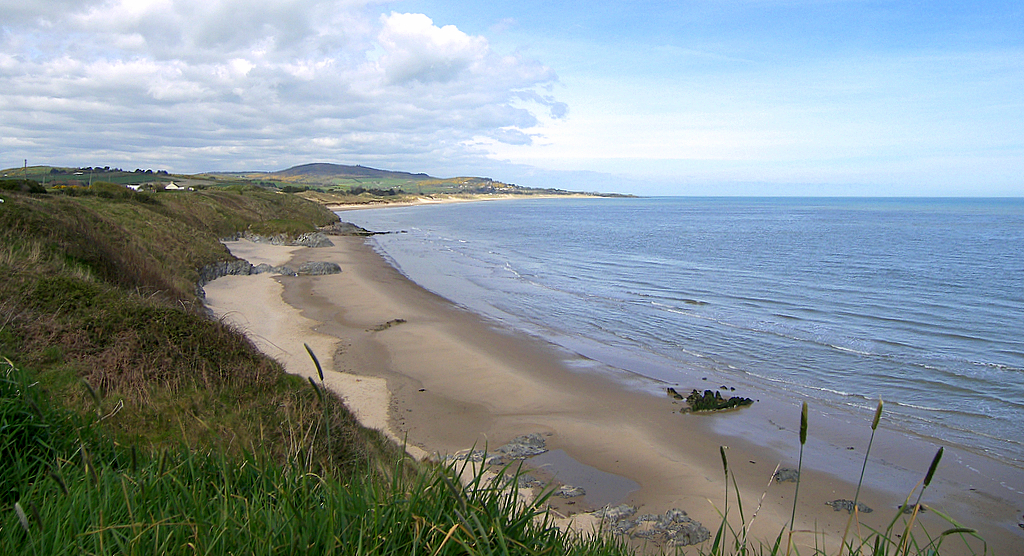
Looking north over Brittas Bay

The 4 kilometres (2.5 mi) long beach is accessed from the R750 regional road which runs parallel to the beach, separated from it by extensive areas of sand dunes. It is 12 kilometres (7.5 mi) by road south of Wicklow and about 65 kilometres (40 mi) south of the city centre of Dublin. Brittas Bay is in the civil parish of Dunganstown in the barony of Arklow on the southern coast of County Wicklow.

== History ==
There was a Christian settlement in nearby Three-Mile-Water prior to St Patrick's arrival in Ireland. This settlement was presided over by a Roman prelate Palladius, who was sent by Cellestine to Ireland in 431 AD. He was assisted by two monks named Sylvester and Solinus. Later St Baoithin ruled over a monastery in the area and one of his pupils was St Kevin who founded the Christian settlement in Glendalough.

A 17th-century smuggler and pirate named Captain Jack White operated from Jack's Hole, a secluded cove where he intercepted goods from British merchant ships and imported goods from France to the annoyance of Crown authorities who were thus deprived of customs revenue.

Until the end of September 2012 Bus Éireann route 2 used to stop at Jack White's Cross numerous times each day. There was considerable public dissatisfaction with the decision to terminate the route. The stop at Jack White's Cross was subsequently reinstated in the route 2 timetable from 25 August 2013.

== Landmarks ==
Several caravan parks are in the vicinity including Staunton's Caravan Site, O'Drischoll's Caravan Park and Brittas Bay Park. The European Club golf club is to the south near the hamlet of Ardanary on Mizen Head. Dunganstown Castle lies to the northeast of Brittas Bay.

== Popular culture ==
Some of the beach scenes in John Boorman's 1974 science-fiction film Zardoz, when the 'Exterminators' are attacking the 'Brutals', were filmed at Brittas Bay.

Brittas Bay has been used as a filming location for the 2002 film adaptation of The Count of Monte Cristo as well as History Channel's Vikings.
