= N11 road (Ireland) =

National primary road in Ireland

N11 road
- Bóthar N11

Route information
- Part of E01
- Length: 129.07 km (80.20 mi)

Location
- Country: Ireland
- Primary destinations: (bypassed routes in italics): Dún Laoghaire–Rathdown; Stillorgan; Foxrock; Cabinteely; Shankill; County Wicklow; Bray; Greystones; Kilmacanogue; Kilpedder; Newtownmountkennedy; Ashford; Rathnew; Arklow; County Wexford; Inch; Gorey; Clogh; Camolin; Ferns; Enniscorthy; Oilgate; Wexford Town

Highway system
- Roads in Ireland; Motorways; Primary; Secondary; Regional

M11 motorway
- Mótarbhealach M11

Route information
- Part of E01
- Length: 90 km (56 mi)
- Existed: 1991–present
- History: 1991: J3 to J6 1999: J20 to J21 2004: J14 to J17 2007: J21 to J24 2015: J18 to J19 2019: J24 to Scurlocksbush Roundabout

Major junctions
- From: Loughlinstown Hospital, Coyne's Cross
- J4 → M50 motorway J25 → N30 road
- To: Bray, Enniscorthy

Location
- Country: Ireland
- Primary destinations: Bray, Wicklow, Arklow, Gorey, Enniscorthy

Highway system
- Roads in Ireland; Motorways; Primary; Secondary; Regional

The N11 road is a national primary road in Ireland, running for 129 km (80 mi) along the east side of Ireland from Dublin to Wexford. It passes close to Bray, Greystones, Newtownmountkennedy, Ashford, Wicklow, Arklow, Gorey, and Enniscorthy. Beyond Wexford, the route continues to Rosslare as the N25. The road forms part of European route E01. As of July 2019, the N11/M11 is of dual carriageway or motorway standard from Dublin as far as Oilgate in County Wexford.

The road is a busy commuter route, being the only dual carriageway passing through the south eastern suburbs of Dublin, as well as close to the many commuter towns along the east coast as far south as Gorey. Friday and Sunday evenings in summer also see very heavy traffic as Dubliners decamp to and return from their many holiday home locations along the County Wicklow and County Wexford coastlines.

== Original route out of and into Dublin ==
The N11 commenced where it met the N4 on the south end of O'Connell Bridge in Dublin city centre. The route proceeded along D'Olier Street, College Street (and in the opposite direction, Westmoreland Street). The route continued around College Green and Grafton Street (and in the other direction, Suffolk Street, Church Lane and Dame Street). From here, the route continued out of the city via Nassau Street, Kildare Street, North side of St. Stephen's Green, Merrion Row, Baggot Street Lower, Pembroke Street Lower, Fitzwilliam Square West and Pembroke Street Upper. This route section in the other direction (into the city centre) ran via Leeson Street Lower, East and North sides of St. Stephen's Green and Dawson Street. The N11 ran in both directions along Leeson Street Lower after the junction with Pembroke Street. Having crossed the Grand Canal the route divided again for a portion of Leeson Street Upper, with outbound traffic proceeding via Sussex Road. The route continued via Morehampton Road and Donnybrook Road, through Donnybrook. Eventually converting from single carriageway (including bus lanes either side) to dual carriageway at Donnybrook Church, which marks the beginning of what is known as the Stillorgan Road.

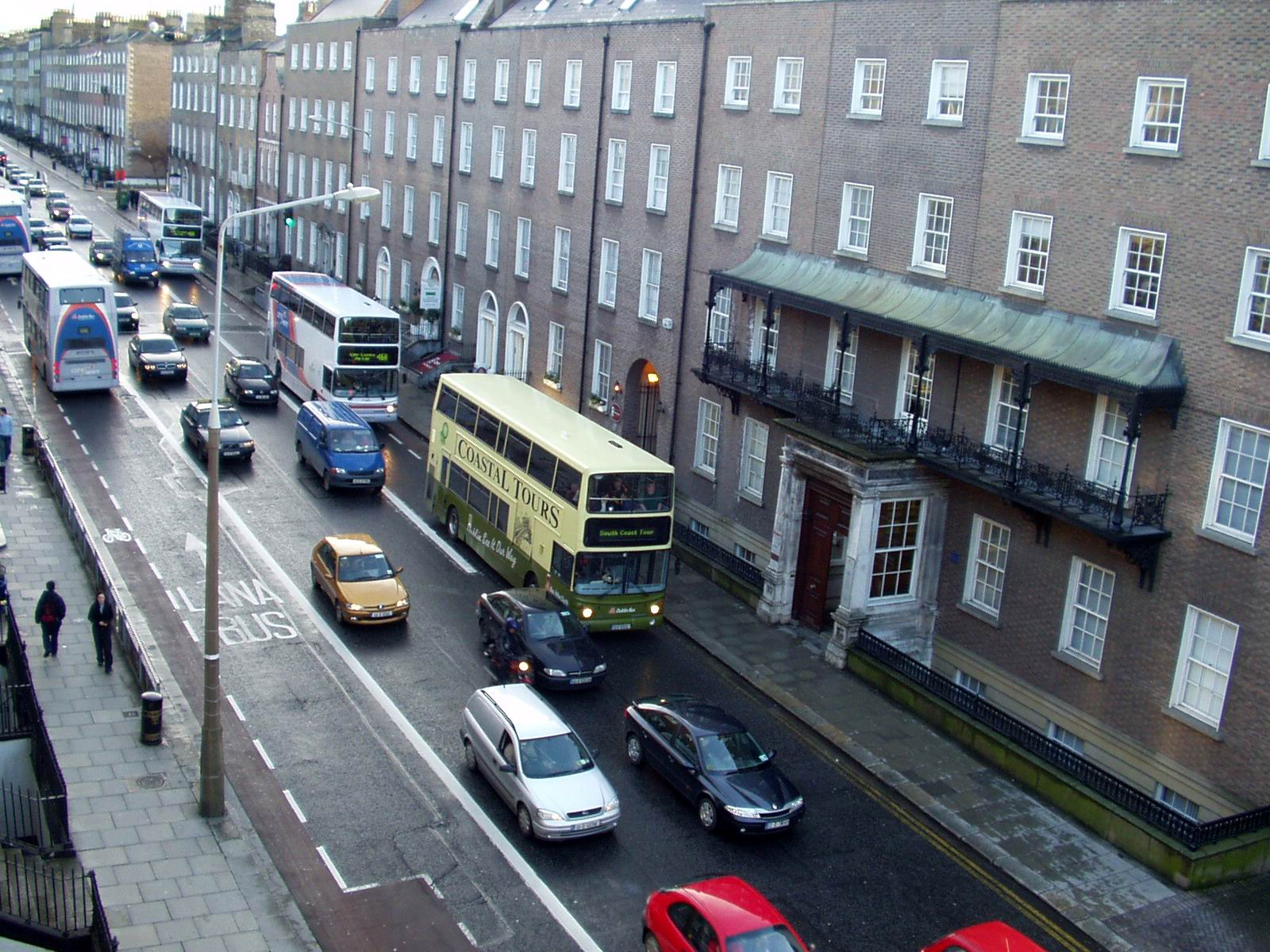
Former N11, now R138 looking South on Leeson Street

The Stillorgan Road brought the road past Belfield, where University College Dublin is located (and accessed from a grade-separated interchange on the dual carriageway - the first full interchange built in Ireland) and onwards to its junction with Mount Merrion Avenue.

This former section of the N11 is now the R138.

== Current starting point ==
Heading south, the N11 currently starts in Mount Merrion at the junction with the N31 to Dún Laoghaire harbour.

From this junction, it heads south to Stillorgan. Stillorgan village is bypassed to the east by the N11 dual carriageway, which proceeds southeast through Galloping Green, bypassing Leopardstown and Foxrock to the east also. Then the Cabinteely Bypass and part of the Bray Road bring the N11 via Loughlinstown to north of Shankill, where the M11 motorway commences as the Bray/Shankill Bypass.

The entire length of the N11, from Mount Merrion to the Loughlinstown roundabout, is provided with a Quality Bus Corridor (QBC) bus lane. Dublin Bus route E2 operates over this stretch of road as far as the junction with Kill Lane in Foxrock. The E1 bus links Bray to various parts of the city centre as far as Northwood near Ballymun

== Link with M50 ==
Along the Shankill Bypass, the M11 is joined by the Dublin's M50 motorway partial ring road, which terminates at a major junction along the M11, which opened in June 2005. This link allows motorists to drive on continuous motorway and dual carriageway from Oilgate, County Wexford to various destinations via the M50 and the national roads it serves. These roads include the N7 to Limerick, Cork, Waterford, Kildare, the N4 to Sligo, Mayo and Galway, the N3 to Cavan, Donegal and Navan, the N2 to Derry, Letterkenny and Monaghan and the M1 to Dublin Airport, Drogheda, Dundalk, Newry, and Belfast.

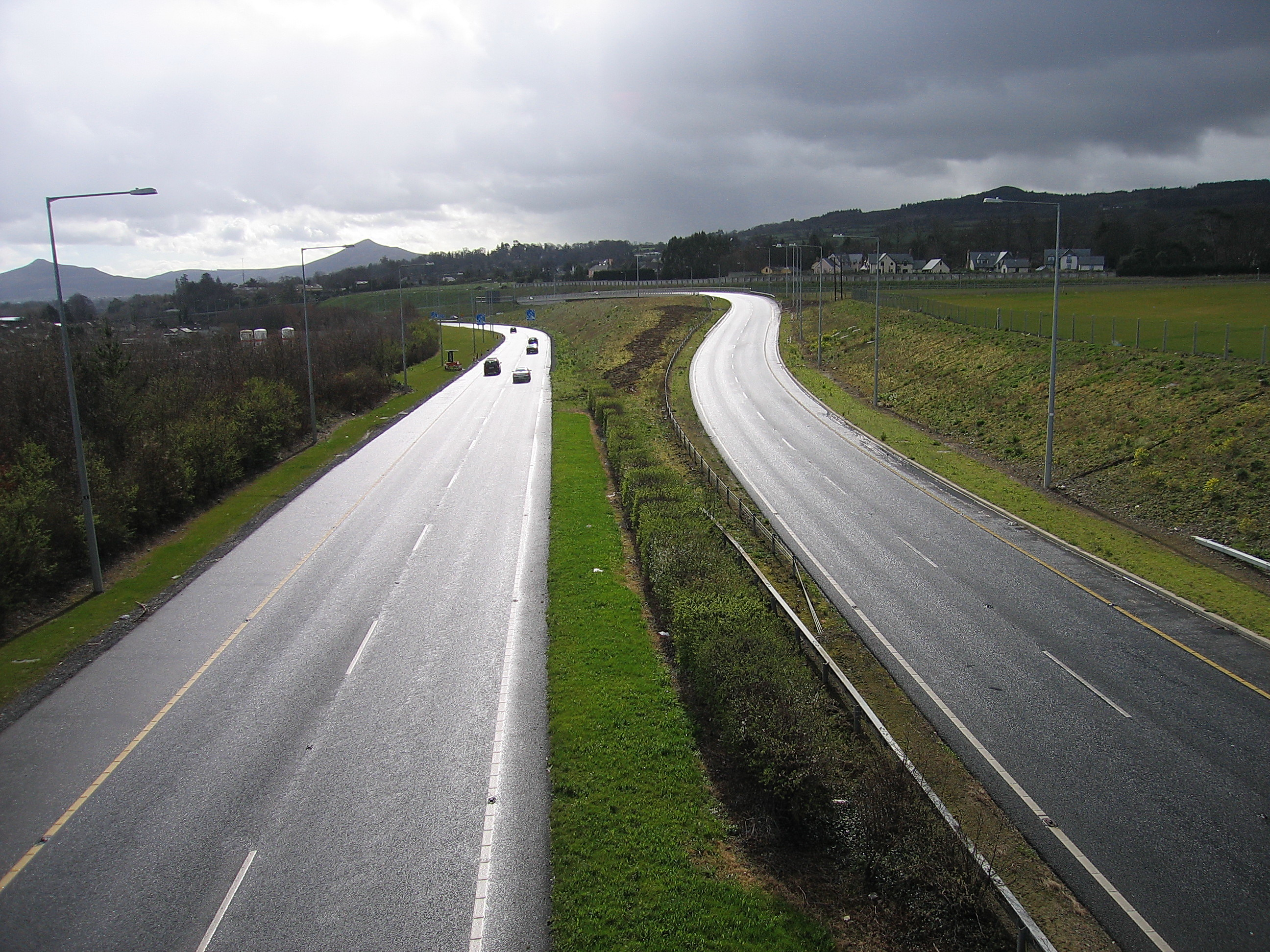
M11 at Shankill

Traffic proceeding north on the M11 is given a choice to stay on the main carriageway (which becomes the M50), or take the exit at what is junction 17 on the M50, in order to stay on the M11, following the N11 and the R138 into the city centre.

== Route through Wicklow and Wexford ==
West of Bray in County Wicklow, the motorway ends, with the N11 continuing south as dual carriageway through the Glen of the Downs. The upgrading of the road to dual carriageway through the Glen of the Downs was controversial, as the valley is a wooded area. Expanding the road resulted in the removal of some woodland. A campaign of protests, mainly by environmental activists, led to long delays in the construction of this section of road, but the work was eventually completed with a minimal disruption to the woodland. After Glen of the Downs the N11 continues south to bypass Kilpedder and Newtownmountkennedy. The road becomes the M11 again at Junction 14 and bypasses Ashford, Rathnew and Arklow (which was bypassed by a dual-carriageway route opened in January 1999 and re-designated as motorway in August 2009).

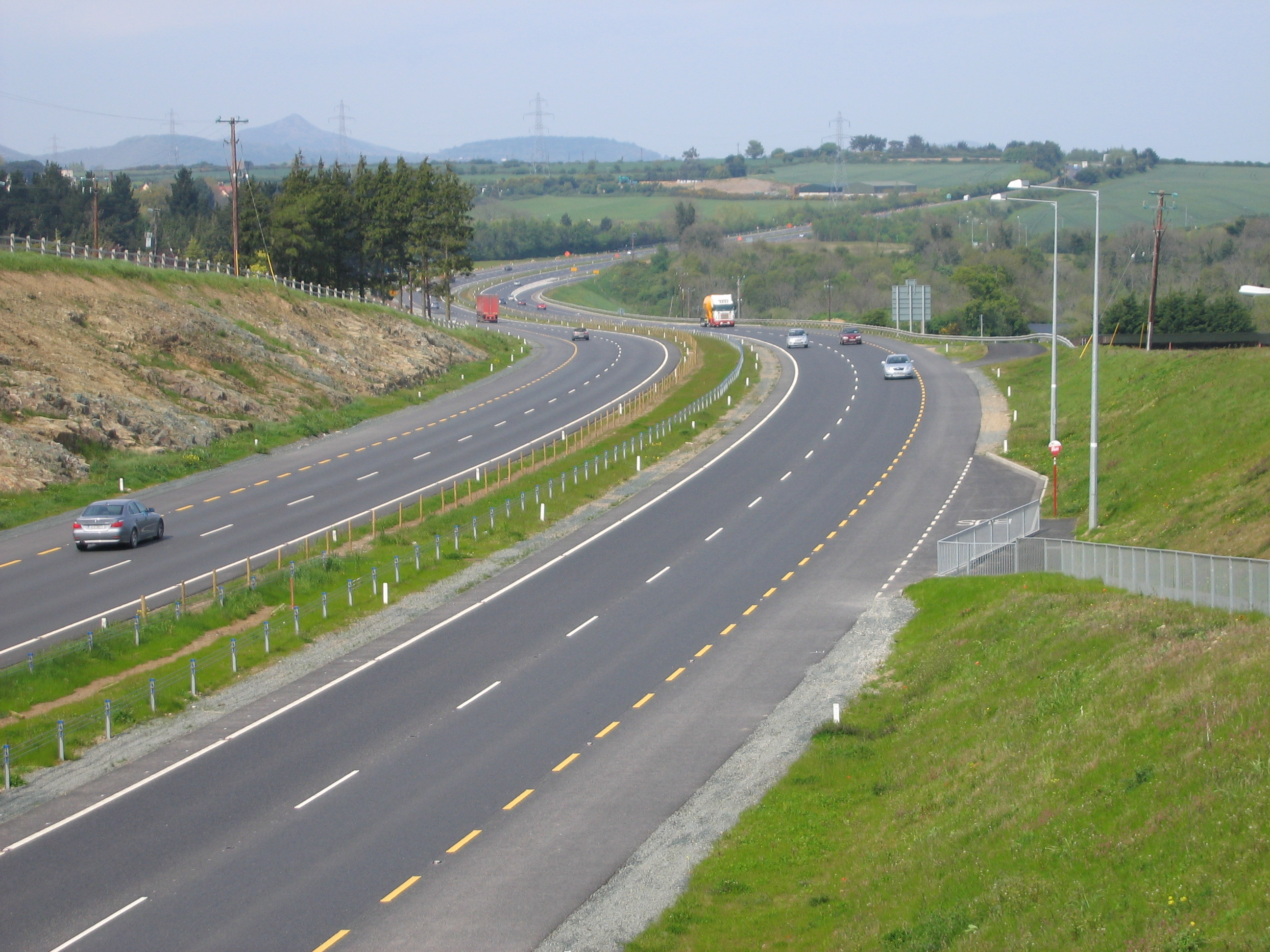
N11 south of Newtownmountkennedy

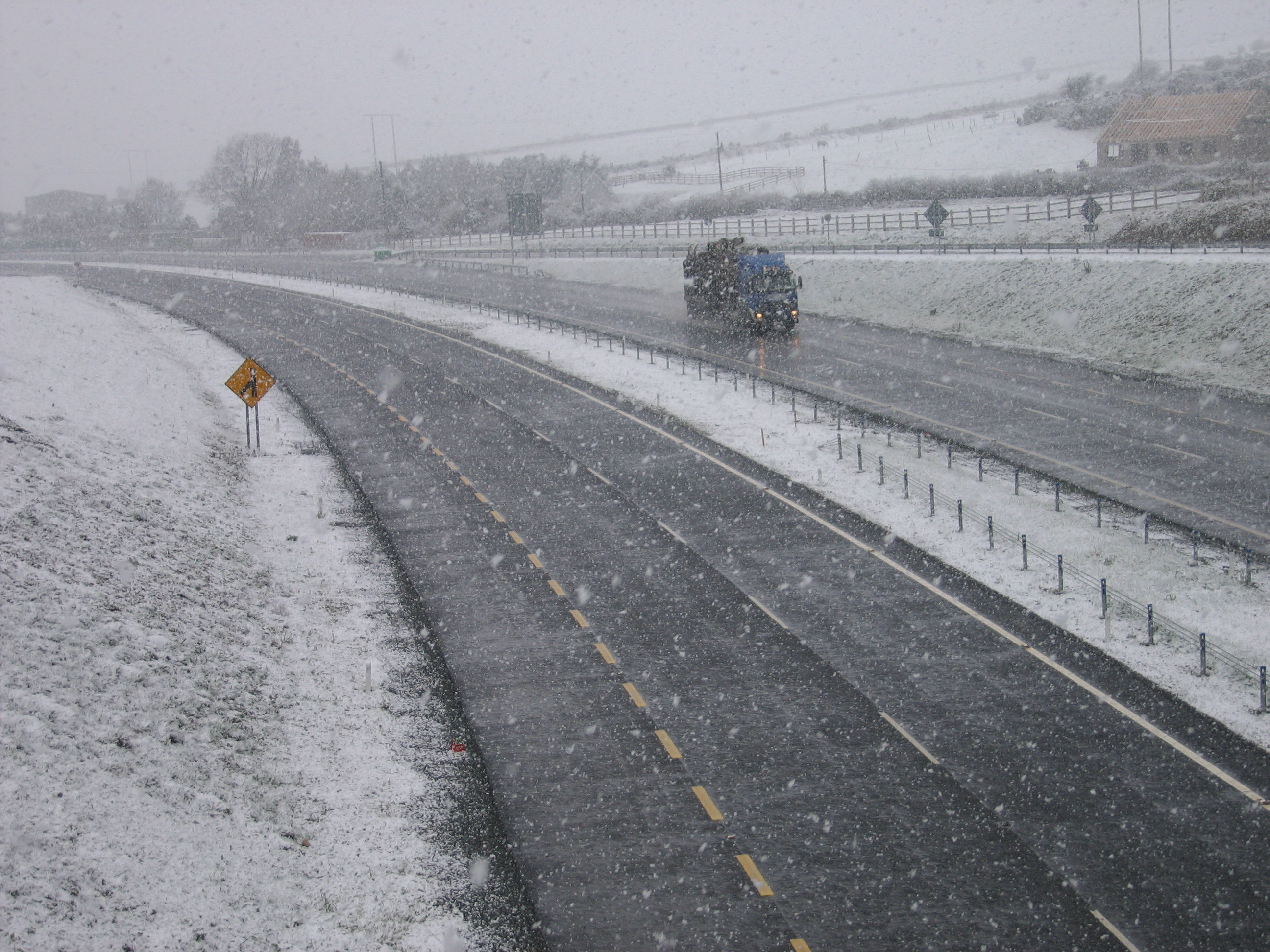
N11 at Blackhill Road west of Wicklow, re-designated M11 from 28 August 2009

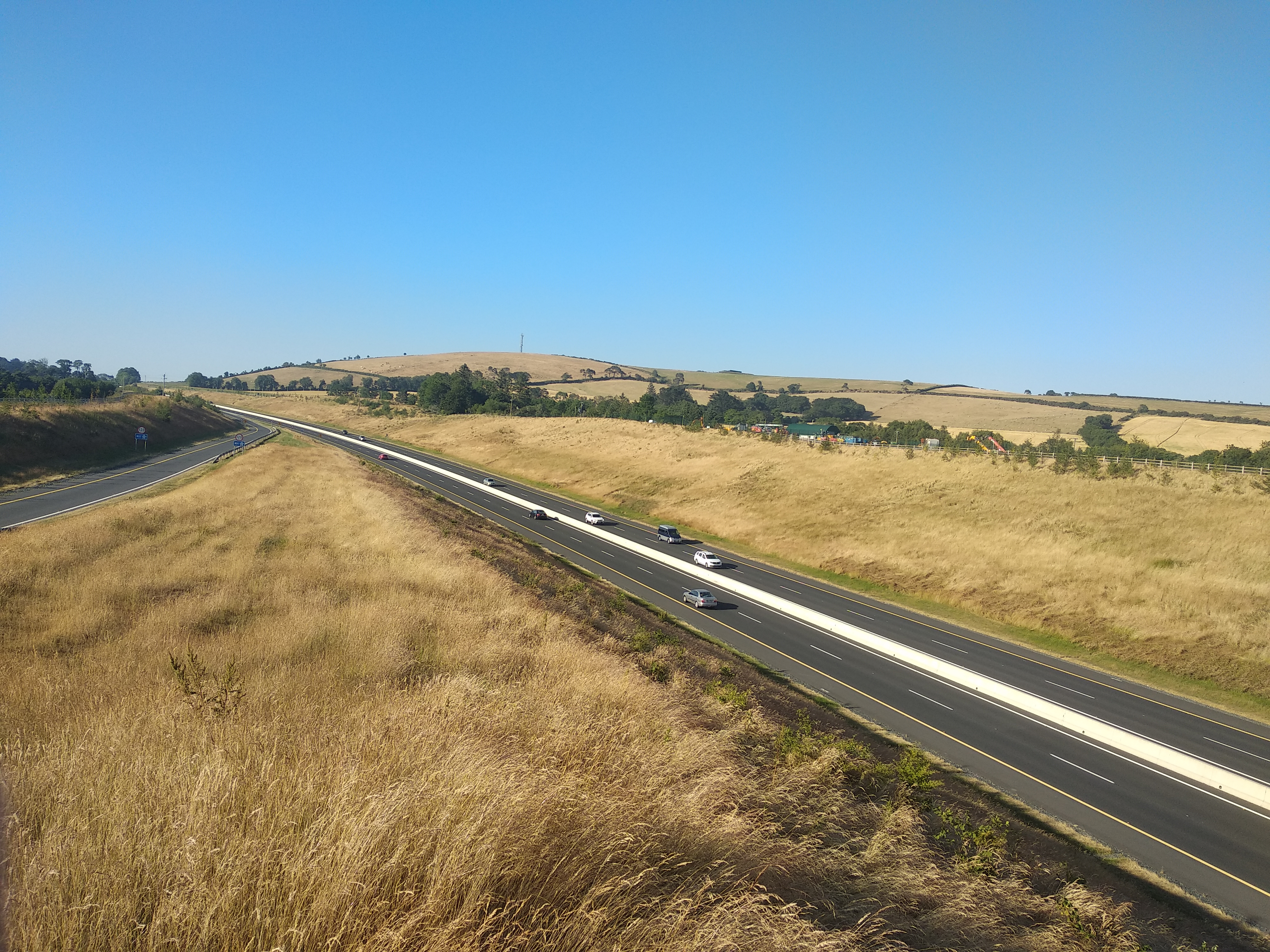
M11 south of Wicklow town

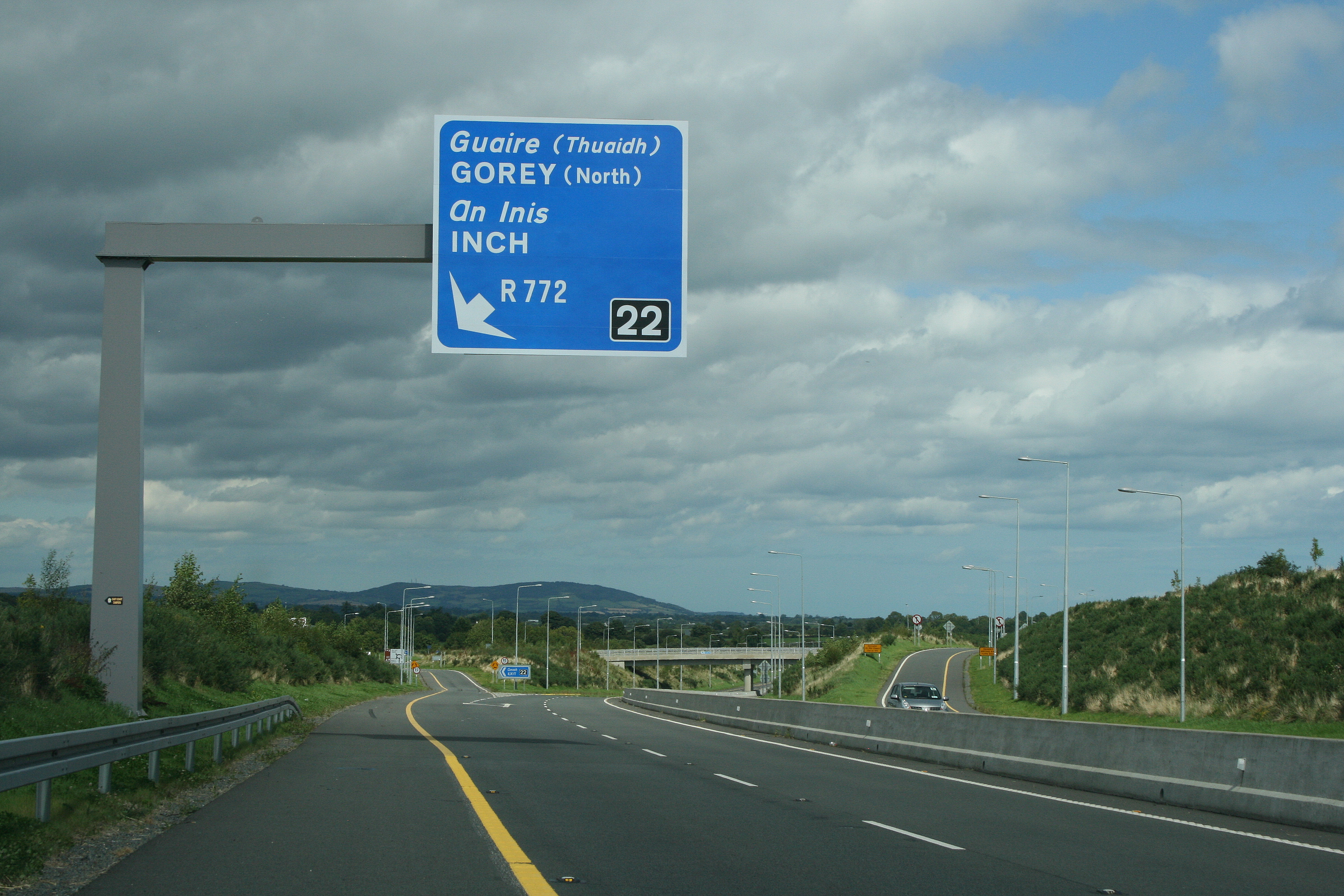
M11 Gorey Bypass

Just north of Inch, the M11 enters County Wexford. The route continues South, bypassing Gorey and Clogh. This section was also re-designated as motorway from 28 August 2009. The former N11 road between Newtownmountkennedy and Gorey is now signposted as the R772 regional road. The M11 then bypasses Camolin, Ferns and Enniscorthy. At Ballydawmore, about 4.25 km east-northeast of Enniscorthy, the N30 from New Ross, which also connects to the N80 from Tullamore at Clavass about 5 km north of Enniscorthy, meets the M11 at a junction, which also connects to R744 road. At the end of the Enniscorthy Bypass the motorway section ends at the Scurlocksbush roundabout. The N11 then continues as a single carriageway. South of here, the N11 passes through Oilegate, County Wexford, continuing south through Ferrycarrig, and crossing the River Slaney to terminate on a bypass west of Wexford where it meets the N25 from Waterford at the Ballindinas roundabout.

== Upgrades ==
The N11 has been gradually upgraded from single to dual carriageway standard from the 1950s to the present, with improvements taking place at an accelerated pace in recent years. The first short stretch of dual carriageway on the road, and the first stretch of dual carriageway in Ireland, was built in the 1950s between the Stillorgan Road/Newtownpark Avenue junction (White's Cross) and Foxrock Church (this stretch was substantially widened around the turn of the millennium). Subsequent short stretches of dual carriageway, at Loughlinstown, between Bray and Kilpedder, and from Donnybrook to Stillorgan were constructed during the early to mid-1970s, this phase ending with the opening of the Stillorgan bypass in October 1977. Since that time, these sections have been joined up through further improvements.

=== Timeline (from 1970) ===
- 1970: Kilcroney dual carriageway (with at grade junctions) from Fassaroe to Kilmacanogue, west of Bray. 3 km.
- 1972: Kilpedder bypass; dual carriageway (with at grade junctions) but including one road underpass, the first "flyover" in Ireland. 2 km.
- 1974: Belfield flyover; a stretch of six-lane dual carriageway with a GSJ at the entrance to UCD, Belfield. 2 km (now part of the R138 regional road)
- 1976: Extensions of the Belfield section in both directions with six-lane dc, at grade, with multiple residential access points. 2 km. (now part of the R138 regional road)
- 1977: Stillorgan bypass. At grade 4 lane dual carriageway with hard shoulder from Fosters Avenue to White's Cross, replacing earlier 1950s dual carriageway at Galloping Green. 3 km.
- 1984: Cabinteely and Cornelscourt bypass. At grade 4 lane dual carriageway with hard shoulder. 2 km.
- 1986: Old 1950s dual carriageway replaced by at grade 4 lane dual carriageway with hard shoulder between White's Cross and the Cabinteely bypass. 1 km.
- 1990: Newtownmountkennedy bypass. Four lane dual carriageway with hard shoulders and GSJ. 5 km.
- 1991: M11 Bray-Shankill bypass. Motorway from the 1960s Loughlinstown dual carriageway to the Kilcroney (1970) dual carriageway. 5 km.
- 1993: Fassaroe Bridge; grade separated junction created at the end of the M11/start of Kilcroney dual carriageway.
- 1995: Ram Bridge; grade separated junction created linking the N11 to the southern end of Bray.
- 1999: Arklow bypass; fully grade separated dual carriageway (re-classified as motorway in 2009). 10 km.
- 2003: Glen of the Downs dual carriageway joining the dual carriageway north of Kilmacanogue to the 1972 Kilpedder bypass. 5 km.
- 2004: New dual carriageway replaced the 1960s Loughlinstown dual carriageway and included a grade separated junction with the R118. 3 km.
- 2004: Ashford/Rathnew bypass; fully grade separated dual carriageway (partially re-classified as motorway in 2009). 14 km.
- 2007: Gorey bypass; fully grade separated dual carriageway (re-classified as motorway in 2009). 22 km.
- 2008: Grade separated junction created on the Kilpedder bypass (1972) to link with the new R774 dual carriageway to Greystones.
- 2015: Arklow-Rathnew; motorway from Rathnew to Arklow. Officially opened to traffic on 13 July 2015. 14 km
- 2019: Enniscorthy bypass; motorway from Clogh to Scurlocksbush, also connecting the M11 to the N30 and the N80. Officially opened to traffic on 18 July 2019. 27 km Since it was completed in 2019, dual carriageway or motorway extends from Donnybrook near central Dublin (R138) to north of Oilgate in County Wexford.

Initial planning is underway to bypass Oilgate by building a new dual carriageway N11 from the end of the current M11 Enniscorthy bypass to the N25 near Wexford Town. A new section of N25 will complete the up-grade of Euroroute 01 between the M50 and Rosslare Harbour.

If this project was completed as planned, there would be no single carriageway sections of the N11 left.

On 30 September 2008, the Department of Transport proposed that the dual carriageway sections from Ashford to south of Rathnew, and from north of Arklow to south of Gorey, be reclassified as motorway under the Roads Act 2007. The Statutory Instrument for these reclassifications was passed on 2 July 2009 and came into effect on 28 August 2009. There are two sections of M11 motorway forming part of the N11 route.

== Junctions ==
County	km	mi	Junction	Destinations	Notes
County Dublin	9.5	5.9	4 (Note: Signs show M50 exit 17)	M50 – Dublin Airport, Dublin Port	Motorway ends at following roundabout, continues as N11 towards Dublin city centre.
County Dublin	11.5	7.1	5	L2047 – Bray (North), Glencullen, Enniskerry R761 – Bray (North) (southbound)	
County Wicklow	13.5	8.4	6	R918 ‒ Bray, Fassaroe	Continues as N11 dual carriageway
County Wicklow	14.5	9		L1522 – Dargle Lane	LILO junction. Residential cul-de-sac. Southbound entrance and exit only.
County Wicklow	14.5	9	6a	R117 – Enniskerry	LILO junction. Northbound entrance and exit only.
County Wicklow	14.5	9		L1956 – Herbert Road	LILO junction. Leads to Bray. Southbound entrance and exit only.
County Wicklow	15	9.3	7	R767 ‒ Bray (South), Greystones (North)	Enniskerry
County Wicklow	17	10.6	8	R755 ‒ Roundwood, Kilmacanogue	
County Wicklow	18	11.2		L95111 – Moorepark	Residential lane. Northbound entrance and exit only.
County Wicklow	18.5	11.5		L5029 – Quill Road	LILO junction. Leads to Kilmacanogue. Northbound entrance and exit only.
County Wicklow	19.5	12.1	9	L1031 (northbound) / L1028 (southbound) ‒ Glenview	
County Wicklow	21.5	13.4		Drummin Lane	Exit is not signposted. Northbound entrance only.
County Wicklow	21.5	13.4	10	R762 ‒ Delgany, Drummin	
County Wicklow	22.5	14		R762	LILO junction. Leads back to junction 10. Southbound entrance and exit only.
County Wicklow	23	14.3	11	R774 – Greystones (South), Kilpedder, Kilcoole	
County Wicklow	25	15.5	12	R772 – Newtownmountkennedy (North), Roundwood	
County Wicklow	28.5	17.7	13	R772 ‒ Newtownmountkennedy (South) L5050 ‒ Newcastle	
County Wicklow	32	19.9	14	R772 ‒ Coynes Cross	Continues as M11 motorway.
County Wicklow	33.5	20.8	15	R772 ‒ Ashford	Northbound entrance and southbound exit only.
County Wicklow	37	23	16	R772 ‒ Ashford, Rathnew, Roundwood (northbound) Wicklow (North), Rathnew (southbound)	
County Wicklow	39.5	24.5	17	L1100 ‒ Wicklow, Rathdrum, Rathnew	
County Wicklow	42.5	26.4	18	R772 ‒ Wicklow (South), Redcross	
County Wicklow	51.5	32	19	R773 ‒ Brittas Bay	
County Wicklow	59	36.6	20	R772 ‒ Arklow (North), Redcross	
County Wicklow	66	41	21	R772 ‒ Arklow (South), Inch	
County Wexford	69.5	43.2	Gorey Service Area		
County Wexford	75	16.6	22	R772 ‒ Gorey (North), Inch	
County Wexford	81	50.3	23	R741 ‒ Gorey, Ballycanew R742 – Courtown	
County Wexford			24	R772 ‒ Ferns, Camolin	
County Wexford			25	N30 ‒ New Ross, Carlow (N80), Enniscorthy (R772) R744 – Blackwater	Ferns
County Wexford				R772 – Enniscorthy	Motorway ends at roundabout. Continues as N11 single carriageway towards Wexford and Rosslare Harbour.
1.000 mi = 1.609 km; 1.000 km = 0.621 mi: Incomplete access; Route transition

== See also ==
- Roads in Ireland
- National secondary road
- Regional road
