= R119 road (Ireland) =

Road in Ireland

R119 road
- Bóthar R119
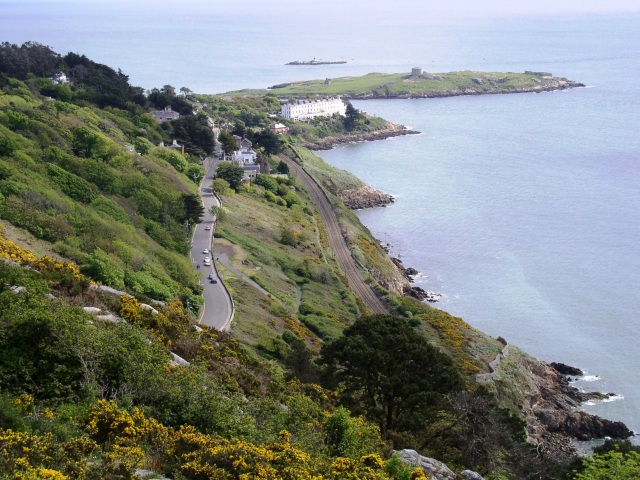
- Vico Road, Killiney, on the R119

Location
- Country: Ireland

Highway system
- Roads in Ireland; Motorways; Primary; Secondary; Regional

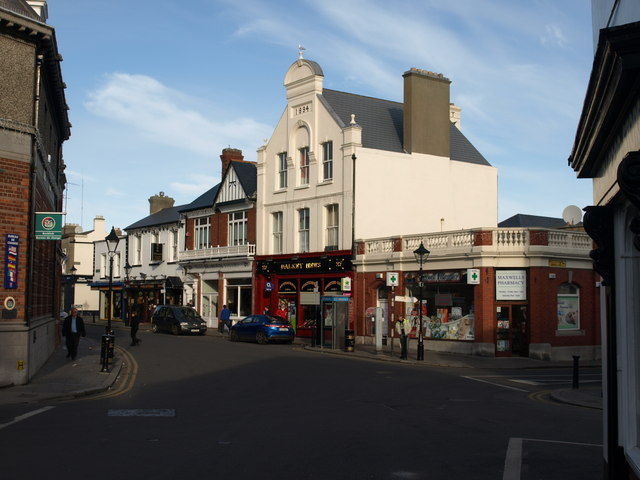
Castle Street, Dalkey, on the R119

The R119 road is a regional road in Dún Laoghaire–Rathdown, Ireland.

The official description of the R119 from the Roads Act 1993 (Classification of Regional Roads) Order 2012 reads:

R119: Blackrock - Dun Laoghaire County Dublin - Bray, County Wicklow

Between its junction with R113 at Templehill and its junction with N31 at Crofton Road via Monkstown Road, Monkstown Crescent, Longford Hill, Cumberland Street and Clarence Street all in the county of Dun Laoghaire — Rathdown

and

between its junction with R118 at Park Road and its junction with M11 at Old Connaught via Summerhill, Glasthule Road, Sandycove Road, Breffni Road, Ulverton Road (and via Barnhill Road and Hyde Road); Castle Street and Railway Road at Dalkey; Sorrento Road, Vico Road, Victoria Road, Killiney Hill Road (and via Seafield Road and Station Road Killiney), Shanganagh Road, Shankill and Cork Little all in the county of Dun Laoghaire — Rathdown.

== See also ==
- Roads in Ireland
- National primary road
- National secondary road
- Regional road
