= Carrick Mountain =

Mountain in Ireland

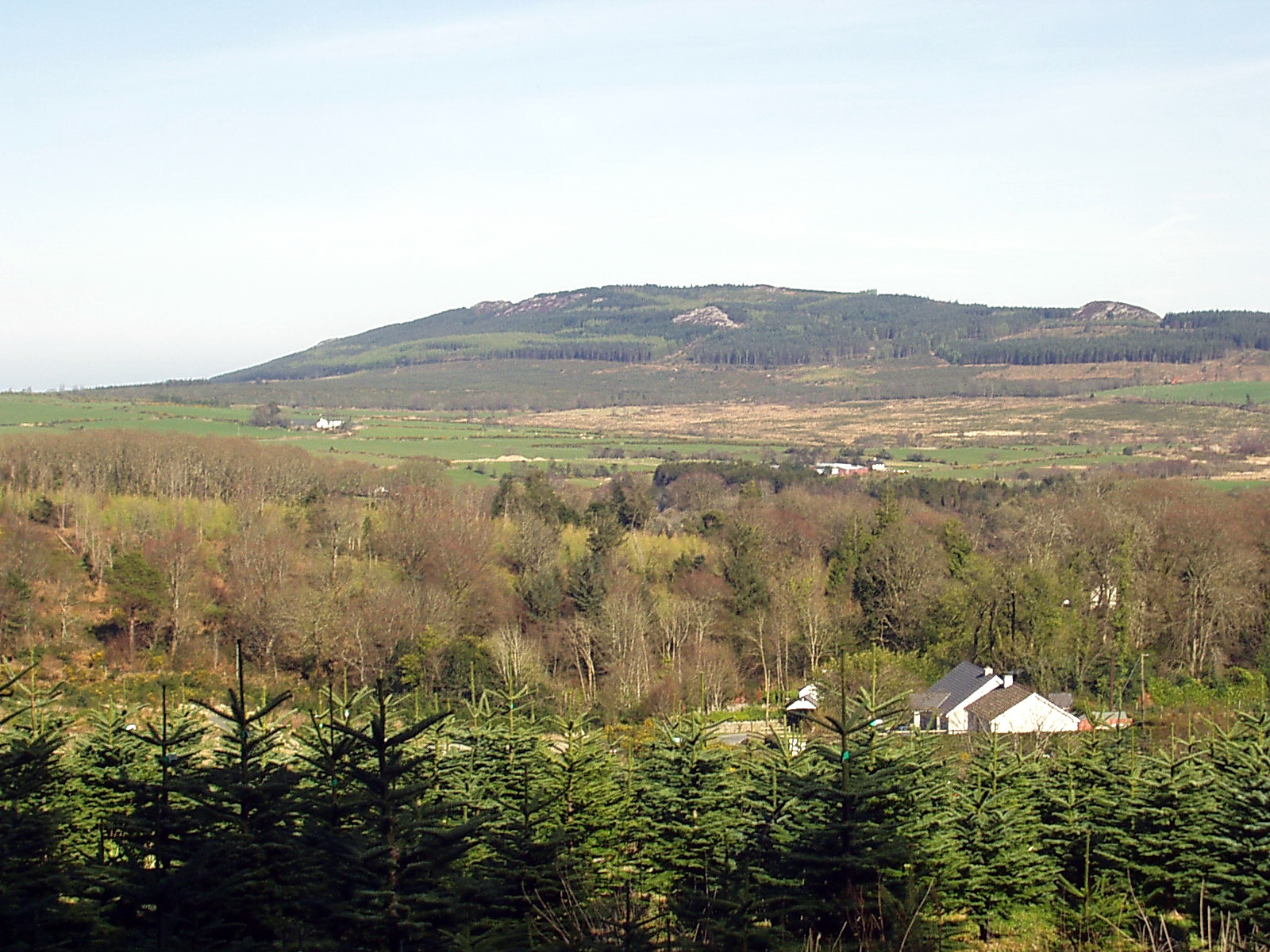
- Carrick from the SW

Highest point
- Elevation: 381 m (1,250 ft)
- Listing: Marilyn
- Coordinates: 52°58′50″N 6°9′59″W

Naming
- Language of name: Irish

Geography
- Location within Ireland
- Location: County Wicklow, Ireland
- Parent range: Wicklow Mountains
- OSI/OSNI grid: T232940
- Topo map: OSi Discovery 56

Climbing
- Easiest route: Glenealy village, from southeast

Carrick Mountain is located in the eastern foothills of the Wicklow Mountains in Ireland. Historically it was called Carrigmurrely (1756) and Carrickmacreily (1795).

== Geography ==
The mountain rises directly above the village of Glenealy on the R752, midway between Rathnew and Rathdrum. The mountain is, bar a few large rocky knolls, completely covered in forest.

== Access to the summit ==
There is a network of forest roads on the hill, with long straights, steeps slopes, and hair-pin bends; the forest roads, with their sand and gravel surfaces, ascend to within 100 m of the summit. It is a popular location for car rallying (official and unofficial).

== Rock climbing ==
There are granite outcrops near the summit of Carrick, which have been established as a minor rock-climbing location. About 15 single-pitch routes have been recorded, at all grades up to E2.

== See also ==
- List of mountains in Ireland
