= Ballinakil =

Townland in County Wicklow, Ireland

Coordinates: 52.953812°N 6.199189°W

Ballinakil (Irish: Baile na Coille) is a small, sparsely populated townland, located in County Wicklow, Ireland. It is situated off the Glenealy-Rathdrum road, close to Deputy's Pass. The nearest town is Rathdrum, 3 km to the south-west.
