= R753 road (Ireland) =

Regional road in Ireland

R753 road
- Bóthar R753
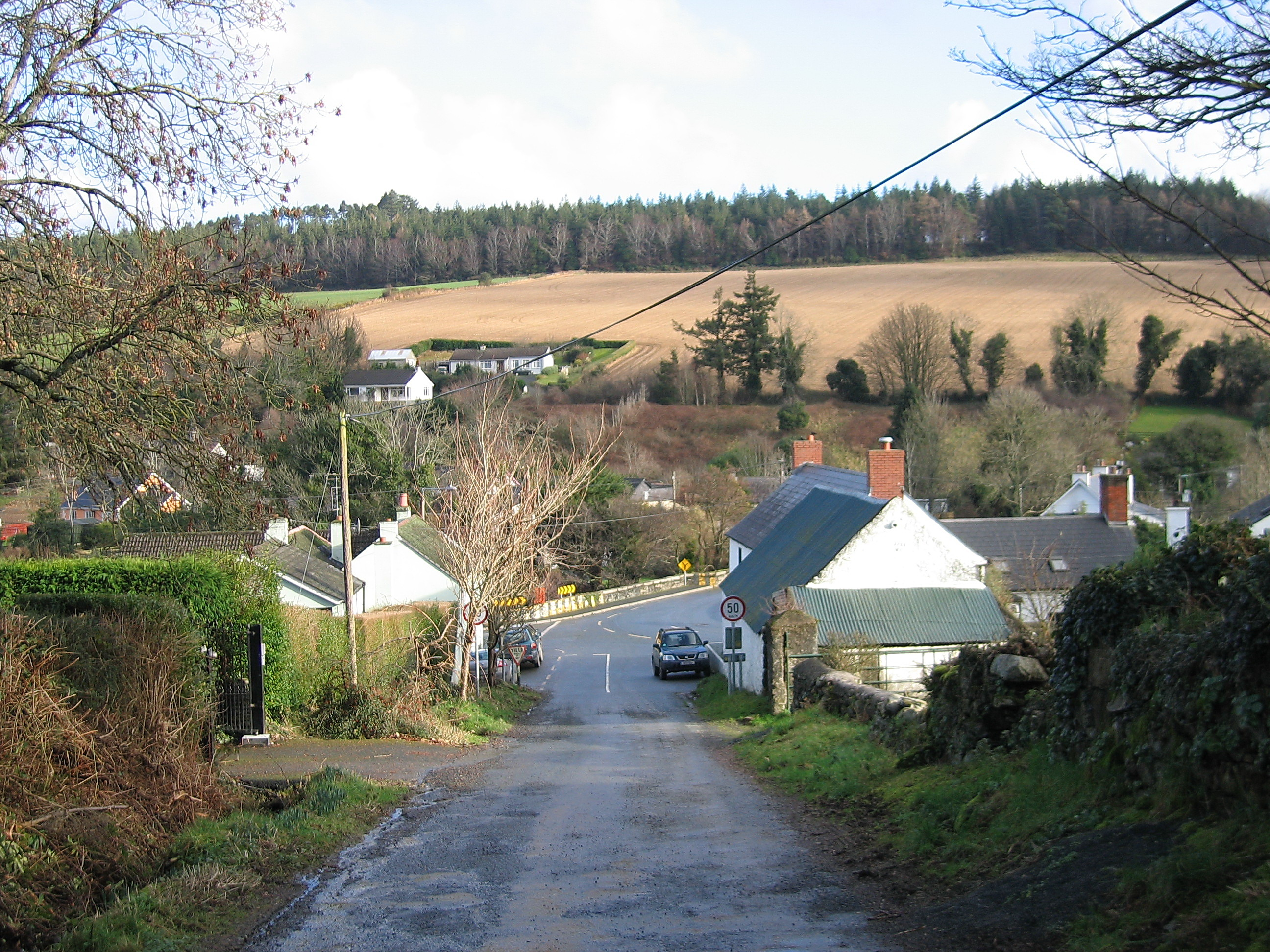
- Above the R753 bridge over the River Avonbeg at Ballinaclash

Route information
- Length: 11.5 km (7.1 mi)

Major junctions
- From: R747 at Killacloran, Aughrim, County Wicklow

- To: R752 at Ballinacarrig

Location
- Country: Ireland

Highway system
- Roads in Ireland; Motorways; Primary; Secondary; Regional
← R752	→ R754

The R753 road is a regional road in County Wicklow, Ireland. It travels from Aughrim to the R752 road, via the village of Ballinaclash. The road is 11.5 kilometres (7.1 mi) long.
