= Glenealy =

Glenealy can mean:

- Glenealy, Hong Kong
- Glenealy School
- Glenealy, County Wicklow, Ireland
  - Glenealy Hurling Club, GAA club based in Glenealy, Co Wicklow
