= Ballinaclash =

Village in County Wicklow, Ireland

Ballinaclash An Chlais
- Village
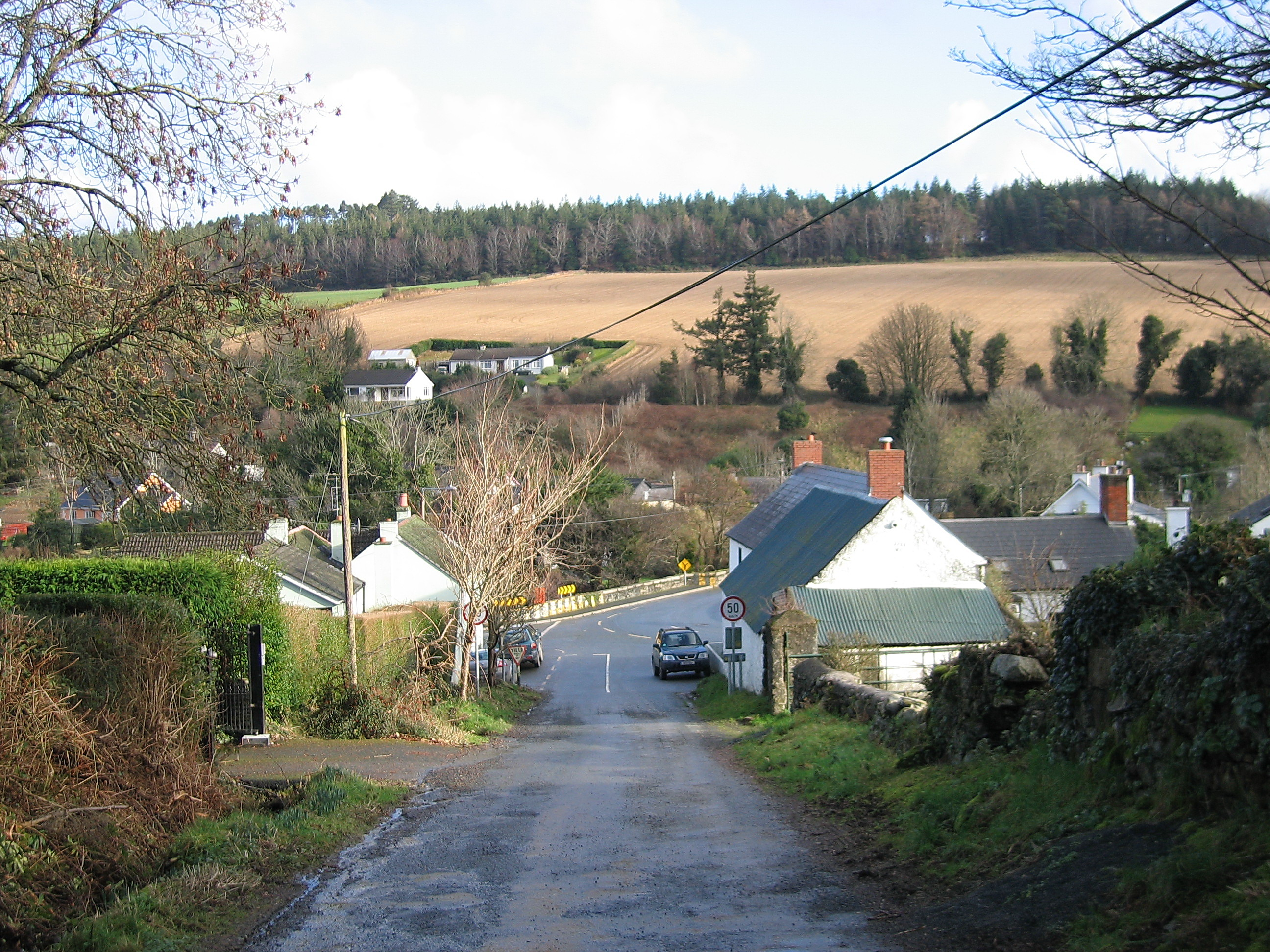
- Ballinaclash village centre

- Location in Ireland
- Coordinates: 52°54′00″N 6°16′00″W
- Country: Ireland
- Province: Leinster
- County: County Wicklow
- Elevation: 60 m (200 ft)

Population (2016)
  - Total: 311
- Time zone: UTC+0 (WET)
  - Summer (DST): UTC-1 (IST (WEST))
- Irish Grid Reference: T167854

Ballinaclash (Irish: An Chlais, meaning 'townland of the ravine') is a village in east County Wicklow, Ireland. Around 4 km south-west of Rathdrum, it is centred on a bridge that carries the R753 road across the River Avonbeg.

The village is mentioned in J.M. Synge's play The Tinker's Wedding: "And a big fool I was too, maybe; but we'll be seeing Jaunting Jim to-morrow in Ballinaclash, and he after getting a great price for his white foal in the horse-fair of Wicklow".

In 1837, the village had a population of 3,855 according to Samuel Lewis' A Topographical Dictionary of Ireland. This population was much reduced by the famine and subsequent emigration and today is only a fraction of that number. The village was originally the site of an ancient monastery founded by the brother of St. Kevin, according to Mervyn Archdall. The site is now occupied by Whaley Abbey; the home of the notorious Buck Whaley.

== See also ==
- List of towns and villages in Ireland
