= R752 road (Ireland) =

Road in Ireland

Coordinates: 52°55′21″N 6°14′26″W

R752 road
- Bóthar R752
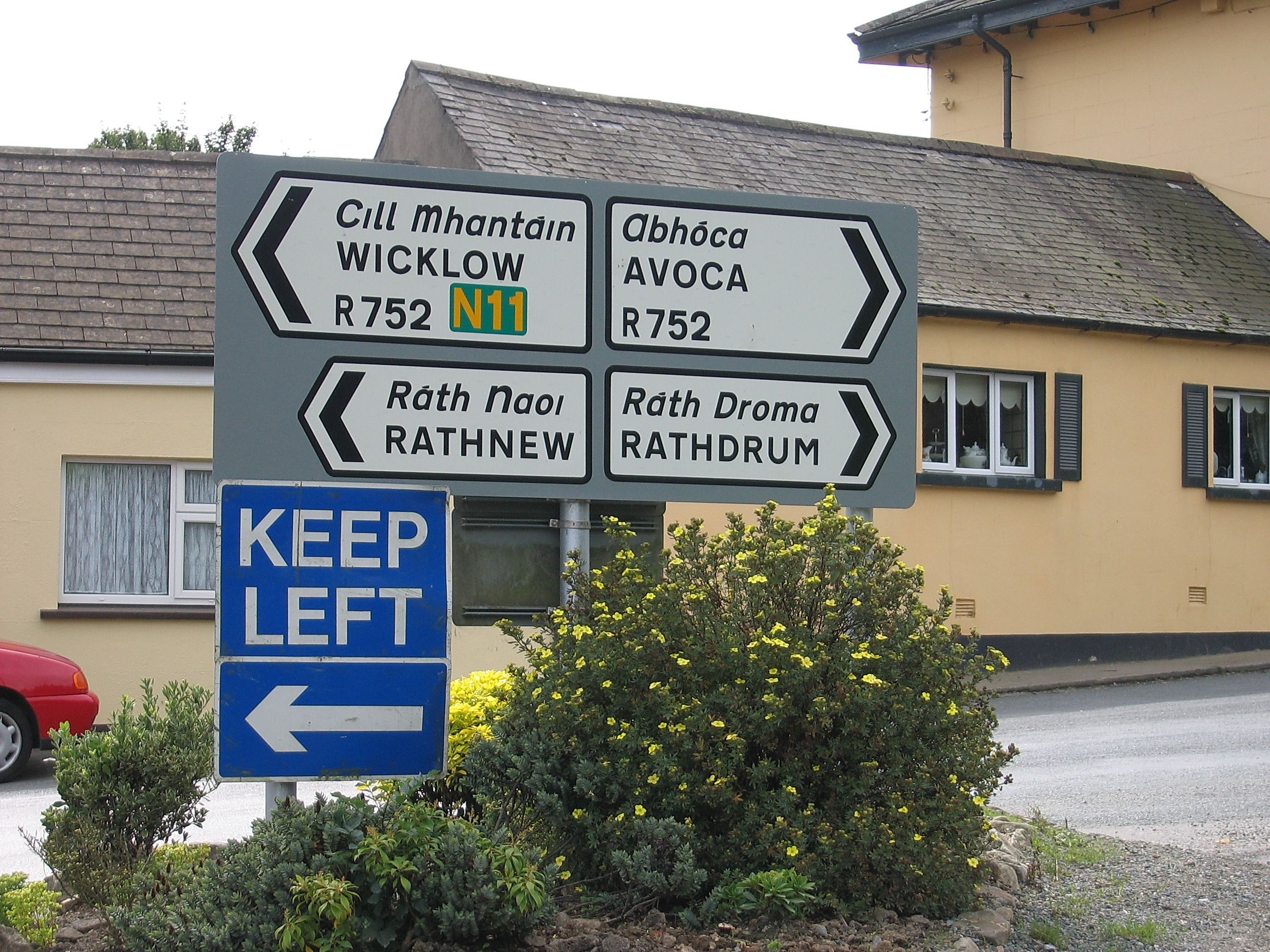
- In Glenealy

Route information
- Length: 26 km (16 mi)

Location
- Country: Ireland
- Primary destinations: County Wicklow; Woodenbridge leave the R747; Avoca; The Meeting of the Waters; R753; Rathdrum, R755; Glenealy; Rathnew, R772 via R750

Highway system
- Roads in Ireland; Motorways; Primary; Secondary; Regional

The R752 road is a regional road in County Wicklow, Ireland. From its junction with the R772 in Rathnew on the outskirts of Wicklow Town it takes a generally south-westerly route to its junction with the R747 in the village of Woodenbridge, where it terminates. The road is 26 km (16 mi) long.

En route it passes through Glenealy, Rathdrum, The Meeting of the Waters and Avoca. It closely follows the route of the Dublin – Wexford - Rosslare Europort railway line and at one stage it was part the main road from Dublin to Wexford, then called the T34.

== See also ==
- Roads in Ireland
- National primary road
- National secondary road
