= Deputy's Pass =

Protected area in Ireland

- Location within Ireland
- Type: National
- Location: County Wicklow
- Coordinates: 52°57′07″N 6°09′50″W
- Area: 116 acres (46.94 ha)
- Operator: National Parks and Wildlife Service (Ireland)
- Status: Open all year

Deputy's Pass (Irish: Céim an Ghiúistís) is a national nature reserve of approximately 116 acres (0.47 km^{2}) located in County Wicklow, Ireland. It is managed by the Irish National Parks & Wildlife Service.

== Features ==
Deputy's Pass was legally protected as a national nature reserve by the Irish government in 1982. The reserve is also listed as a Special Area of Conservation.

The name Deputy's Pass is derived from the Battle of Deputy's Pass, during which the English army cut a pass through the woodland.

The woodland at Deputy's Pass was originally a coppice, and would have been part of the larger Glenealy oak woods. The woods are composed of sessile oak, holly, hazel, birch and beech, with an under planting of wood sorrel, blueberry, bilberry, and woodrush. The Potter River runs through the site, with fauna that include kestrels, wrens, smooth newts and common frogs. There is a 2km walking trail within the reserve.
