= Wicklow 200 =

Wicklow 200 is Ireland's longest running mass participation bike ride or ‘sportive’. The event, also termed a ‘Gran Fondo’, has been promoted annually since 1982 by the Irish Veteran Cyclists Association (IVCA) and attracts up to 3000 riders annually.

Wicklow 200 is a 200 km long bike ride through County Wicklow which includes many of the most challenging hills and most beautiful terrain on Ireland's eastern seaboard.

While the event is not a race, riders’ times for the ride are recorded with an electronic ‘chip‘ The route has varied over the years but invariably takes in many of the most famous challenges in the county known as ‘the Garden of Ireland’.

These include Drumgoff – a climb also known colloquially as the 'Shay Elliott‘ because of the monument at its summit to Ireland's first ever wearer of the yellow jersey in the Tour de France, Wicklow Gap – a climb ridden by the competitors in the 1998 Tour de France - and Slieve Maan among many more well known hills.
