= Irish Open =

Irish Open may refer to:

- Irish Open (golf), a golf tournament on the European Tour
  - Irish Senior Open, a golf tournament on the European Seniors Tour
  - Ladies Irish Open, a golf tournament on the Ladies European Tour
- Irish Open (darts), annual darts tournament
- Irish Open (tennis), a men's and women's tennis tournament
- Irish Open (badminton), international badminton tournament
- Irish Poker Open, a No Limit Texas hold 'em poker tournament
