= County Wicklow =

County in Ireland

Coordinates: 53°00′N 6°25′W

County Wicklow Contae Chill Mhantáin
- County
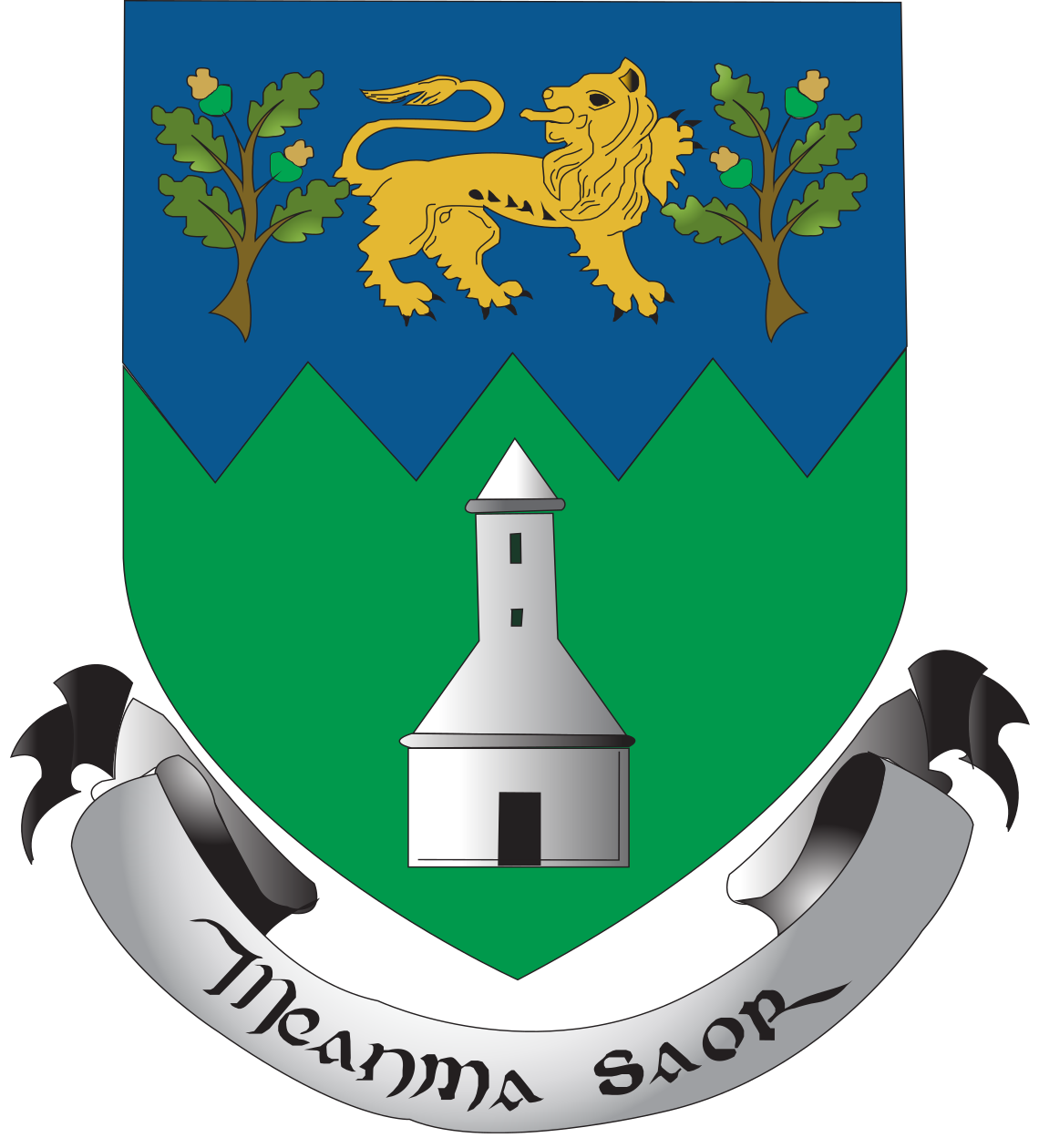
- Coat of arms
- Nickname: The Garden of Ireland
- Motto: Meanma Saor (Irish) "Free Spirits"
- Shown in dark green
- Interactive map of County Wicklow
- Country: Ireland
- Province: Leinster
- Region: Eastern and Midland
- Established: 1606
- County town: Wicklow
- Largest settlement: Bray

Government
  - Local authority: Wicklow County Council
  - Dáil constituency: Wicklow; Wicklow–Wexford
  - EP constituency: South

Area
  - Total: 2,027 km^{2} (783 sq mi)
  - Rank: 17th
- Highest elevation (Lugnaquilla): 925 m (3,035 ft)

Population (2022)
  - Total: 155,851
  - Rank: 16th
  - Density: 76.89/km^{2} (199.1/sq mi)
- Time zone: UTC±0 (WET)
  - Summer (DST): UTC+1 (IST)
- Eircode routing keys: A63, A67, A98 (primarily)
- Telephone area codes: 01, 0402, 0404 (primarily)
- ISO 3166 code: IE-WW
- Vehicle index mark code: WW
- Website: Official website

County Wicklow (/ˈwɪkloʊ/ WIK-loh; Irish: Contae Chill Mhantáin [ˈkɔn̪ˠt̪ˠeː ˌçiːl̠ʲ ˈwan̪ˠt̪ˠaːnʲ]) is a county in Ireland. The last of the traditional 32 counties, having been formed as late as 1606, it is part of the Eastern and Midland Region and the province of Leinster. It is bordered by the Irish Sea to the east and the counties of Wexford to the south, Carlow to the southwest, Kildare to the west, and South Dublin and Dún Laoghaire–Rathdown to the north.

Wicklow is named after its county town of Wicklow, which derives from the name Víkingaló (Old Norse for "Vikings' Meadow"). Wicklow County Council is the local authority for the county, which had a population of 155,258 at the 2022 census. Colloquially known as the "Garden of Ireland" for its scenery—which includes extensive woodlands, nature trails, beaches, and ancient ruins while allowing for a multitude of walking, hiking, and climbing options—it is the 17th largest of Ireland's 32 counties by area and the 16th largest by population. It is also the fourth largest of Leinster's 12 counties by size and the fifth largest in terms of population.

== History ==
=== Missions and monasteries ===
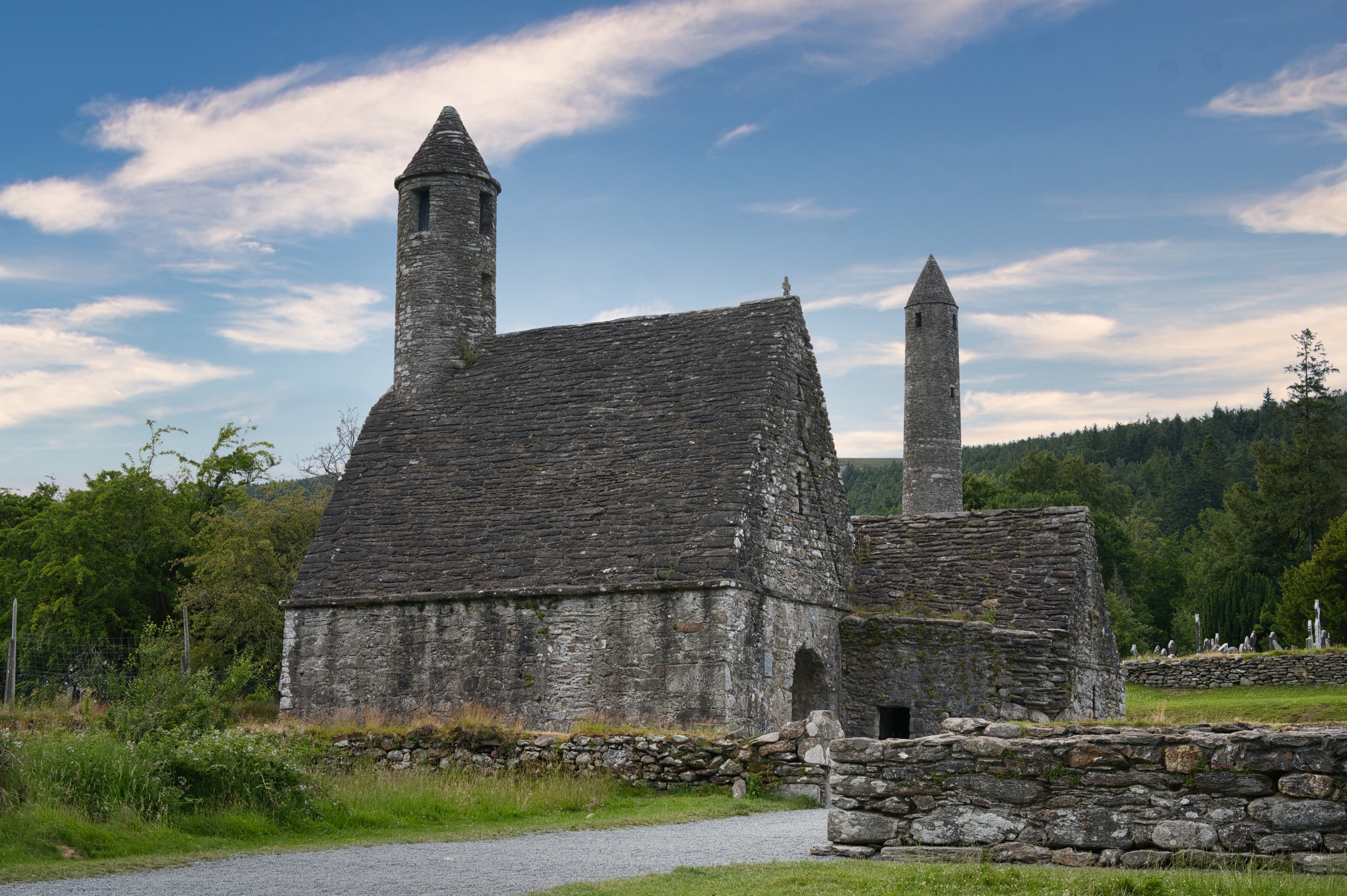
Saint Kevin's monastery at Glendalough.

During the 5th century Saint Palladius, a bishop from Britain or Gaul was sent to 'the Irish believing in Christ.' He and his companions landed at Wicklow harbour in the year 431 AD. Palladius founded three ancient churches at Donard, Tigroney and Colbinstown. Along with him came two clerics named St. Sylvester and Solonius who died and were buried at Donard. The local tribe in the area were called Cualann and their chief, a man named Naithi was opposed to these Christian missionaries. Despite this hostility however Palladius seems to have gained support elsewhere as he was able to erect those three churches in the Wicklow area. After a rather unsuccessful stay in the county St. Palladius departed Ireland and journeyed to Scotland.

A large number of early Irish saints male and female founded churches, monasteries and convents in Wicklow. Among them were St. Kevin, St. Dagan, St. Ernan, St. Credan, St. Baotan and the holy women St. Cainnear, St. Ceoltigherna, St. Fledh, St. Tartinna, St. Coine and St. Croine. The ancient monastery of Glendalough is located in the county.

=== 17th century onwards ===
County Wicklow was the last of the traditional counties of Ireland to be shired in 1606 from land previously part of counties Dublin and Carlow. Established as a distinct county, it was aimed at controlling local groups such as the O'Byrnes. The Military Road, stretching from Rathfarnham to Aghavannagh crosses the mountains, north to south, and was built by government forces to assist them in defeating the rebels still active in the Wicklow Mountains following the failed Irish Rebellion of 1798. It provided them with access to an area that had been a hotbed of Irish rebellion for centuries. Several barracks to house the soldiers were built along the route; in 1974 the Glencree Centre for Peace and Reconciliation was opened alongside the remains of Glencree barracks. Battalions of the Irish Army use firing ranges in County Wicklow for tactical exercises, especially the largest one in the Glen of Imaal which was previously used by the British Army prior to independence.

There was a brief Wicklow gold rush in the year 1795 near the village of Woodenbridge that lasted for a month, during which as many as 80 kilograms of gold was recovered by unlicensed prospectors before the government took over.

During the Cromwellian conquest of Ireland, local authorities immediately surrendered without a fight. During the Irish Rebellion of 1798, some of the United Irishmen insurgents took refuge in the Wicklow Mountains, resulting in clashes between British forces and rebels commanded by Joseph Holt near Aughrim and later at Arklow.

The boundaries of the county were extended in 1957 by the Local Government Act which "detached lands from the County of Dublin and from the jurisdiction and powers of the Council of the County of Dublin" near Bray and added them to the County of Wicklow.

=== Irish language ===
Wicklow was the first county in Ireland to lose the Irish language, with only around 2% of people speaking it in the 1770s. It was spoken on the Western slopes of the Wicklow Mountains in the 1790s. Andrew and Hannah Byrne of Glenealy, who both died in 1830, were among the last native speakers in the county.

== Geography ==
=== Location ===
Topographic map of County Wicklow

Wicklow is part of the Eastern and Midland Region of Ireland, within the province of Leinster. It is bounded by four counties, Dublin to the north; Kildare and Carlow to the west; Wexford to the south; and the Irish Sea to the east. Wicklow is the 17th largest of Ireland's 32 traditional counties by land area, and the 16th most populous. It is the fourth largest of Leinster's 12 counties by size and the fifth most populous. The county is named after the town of Wicklow, located approximately 50 kilometres (31 mi) south of Dublin, the capital city of Ireland.

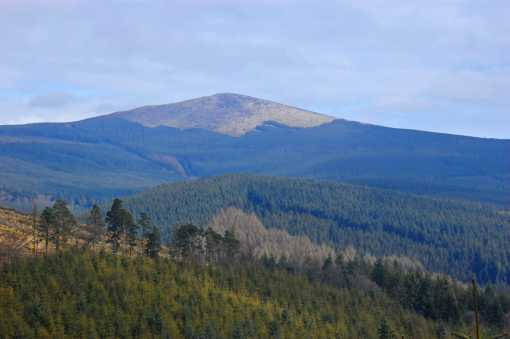
The Wicklow Mountains occupy the whole of central Wicklow

The Wicklow Mountains are Ireland's largest continuous upland area and occupy a significant portion of the county, spanning the entire centre of Wicklow and stretching into Dublin and Wexford at their southern and northern fringes. Lugnaquilla, at 925 metres (3,035 ft) above sea level, is the tallest peak in the range, the highest mountain in Ireland outside of County Kerry, and Ireland's 13th-highest mountain overall. The Wicklow Mountains National Park, located in the middle of the county, is a dedicated protected area covering 205 square kilometres (50,657 acres), making it the largest national park in Ireland. The Wicklow Way was the first long-distance trail in the State, and crosses the range for 131 kilometres (81 mi).

=== Geology ===
The Wicklow Mountains are centred on the Leinster batholith and are primarily composed of granite surrounded by an envelope of mica-schist and much older rocks such as quartzite. Covering 1,500 square kilometres (580 mi^{2}), the Leinster batholith is the most expansive mass of intrusive igneous rock in Ireland or Britain. The oldest rocks in the county are the quartzites of the Bray Group that include Bray Head and the Little Sugar Loaf and Great Sugar Loaf mountains. These metamorphosed from sandstone deposited in the deep waters of the primeval Iapetus Ocean during the Cambrian period (542-488 million years ago).

As with much of Ireland, Wicklow's terrain was sculpted by successive periods of glaciation during the quaternary. Weathering and erosion by ice carved out long valleys known as glens (from the Irish gleann) such as Glenmacnass, Glen of the Downs, Glenmalure, Glen of Imaal, Glencree and Glendalough. The Irish Sea Ice-Sheet began to retreat shortly after the Last Glacial Maximum ca. 20,000–23,000 years ago but significant ice masses persisted in the Wicklow Mountains for another 4,000–7,000 years.

=== Hydrology ===
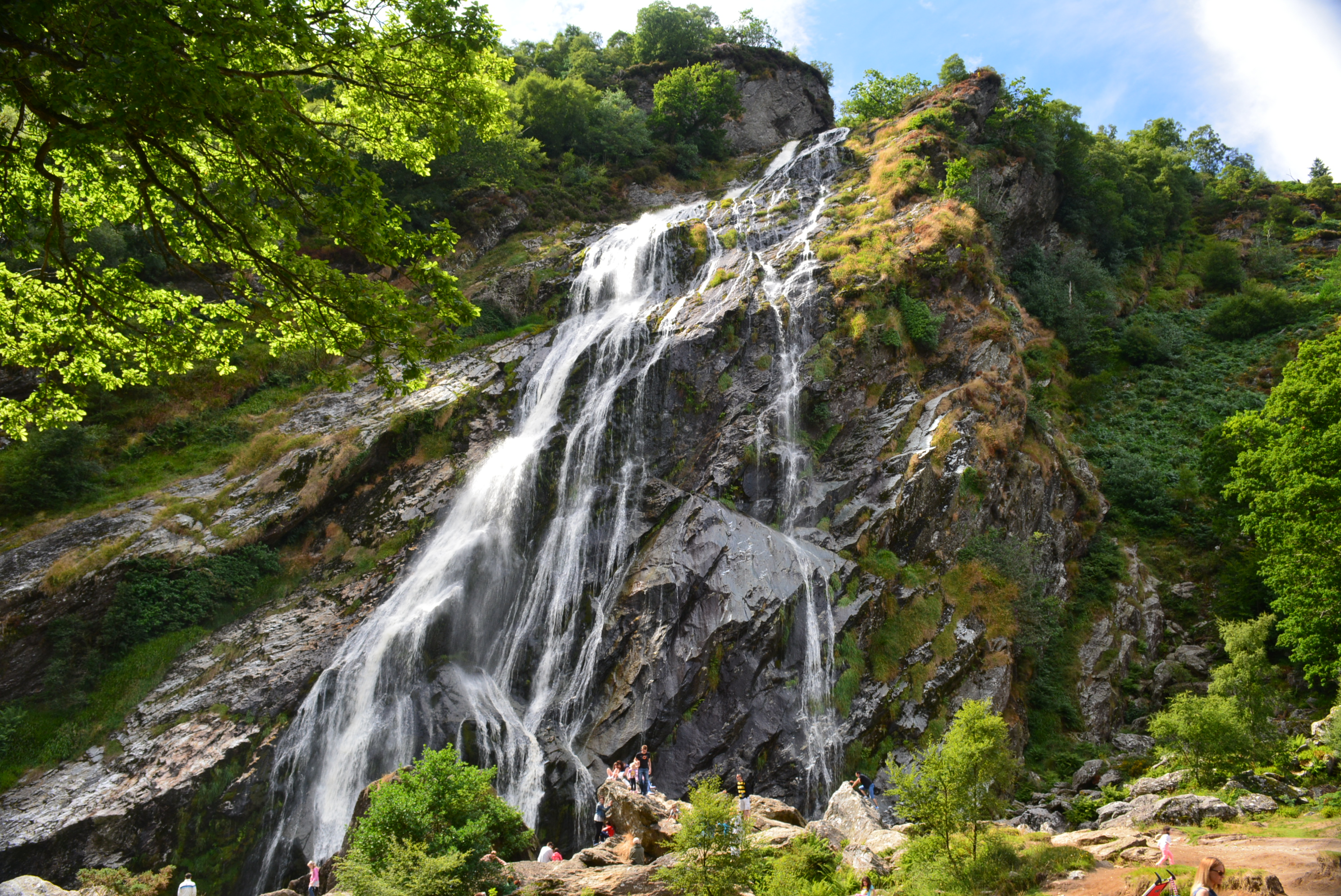
Powerscourt Waterfall, the second highest in Ireland

Major rivers include the 132-kilometre (82.0 mi) River Liffey, Ireland's 8th-longest river, which rises near Tonduff mountain and flows through the centre of Dublin City, reaching the Irish Sea at Dublin Bay. Its biggest tributary by volume, the River Dodder, rises along the northern slope of Kippure in the far north of the county, while the Kings River joins at Blessington Lakes. Multiple other Liffey tributaries flow within the county.

The 117.5-kilometre (73.0 mi) River Slaney, which starts at Lugnaquilla, flows west and then south before reaching St George's Channel at Wexford town. The Avonmore and Avonbeg rivers join to form the Avoca River at the Meeting of the Waters in the Vale of Avoca. The River Derreen in the south of the county defines a section of the border with Carlow.

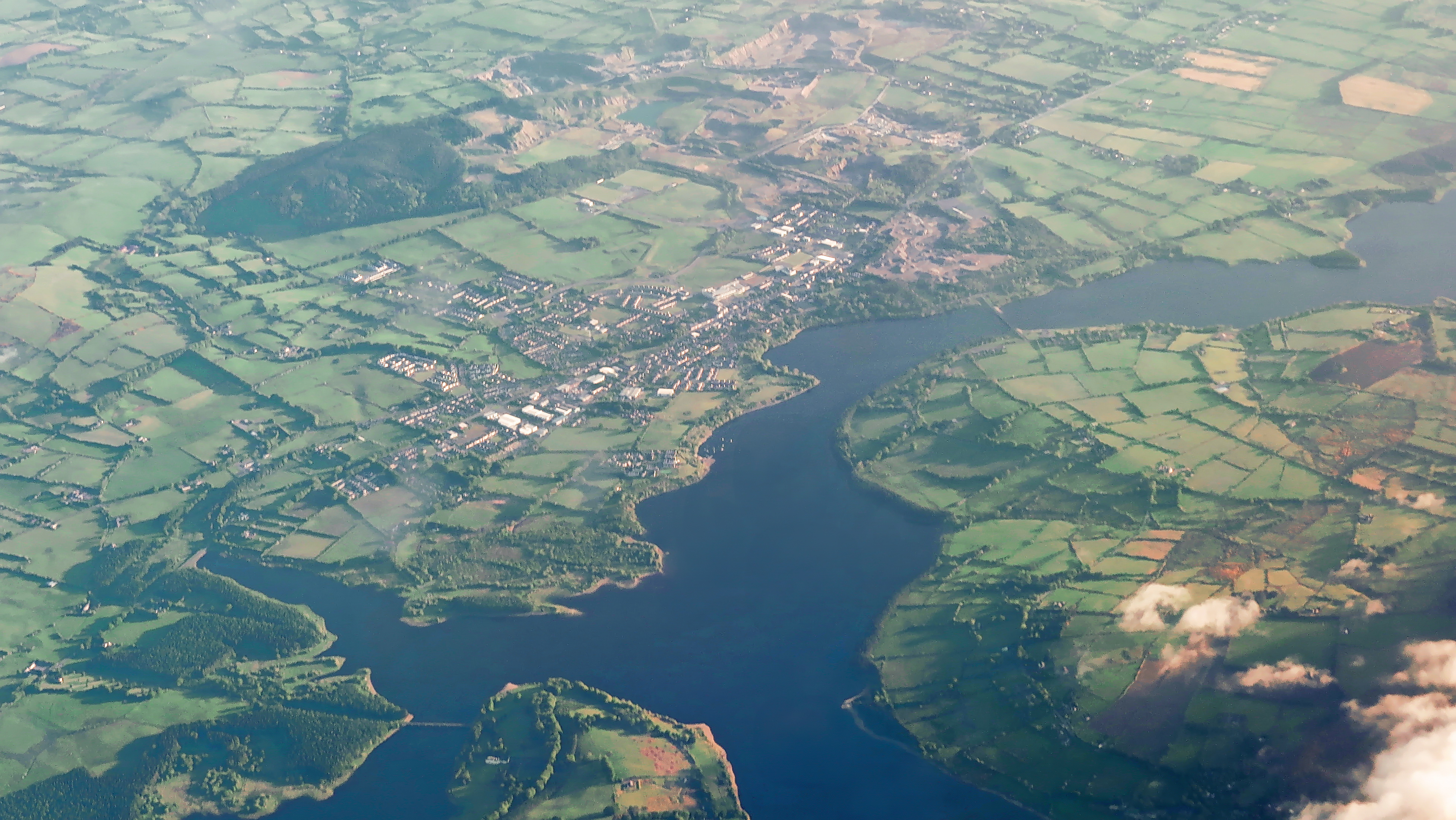
The Poulaphouca Reservoir near Blessington is Ireland's largest artificial lake

Most of the county's lakes (or loughs) are glacially derived ribbon and corrie lakes found in scenic trough valleys surrounded by mountains, making them popular with tourists. Notable lakes in the county include Glendalough Upper Lake, Lough Tay ('The Guinness Lake'), Lough Ouler ('The Heart-shaped Lake'), Lough Bray, Lough Dan and Lough Nahanagan.

Poulaphouca Reservoir is the largest of Wicklow's lakes, covering 2,226 hectares (5,500 acres) in the west of the county. It is the largest artificial lake in Ireland and was created following the damming of the River Liffey at Poulaphouca in 1940. The village of Ballinahown was completed submerged by the reservoir and its 70 families were relocated. Ruins of the old village including buildings, fences and farm machinery can be seen during droughts when water levels in the reservoir diminish. The lower Vartry Reservoir, constructed between 1862 and 1868, is the county's second largest lake.

=== Coast ===
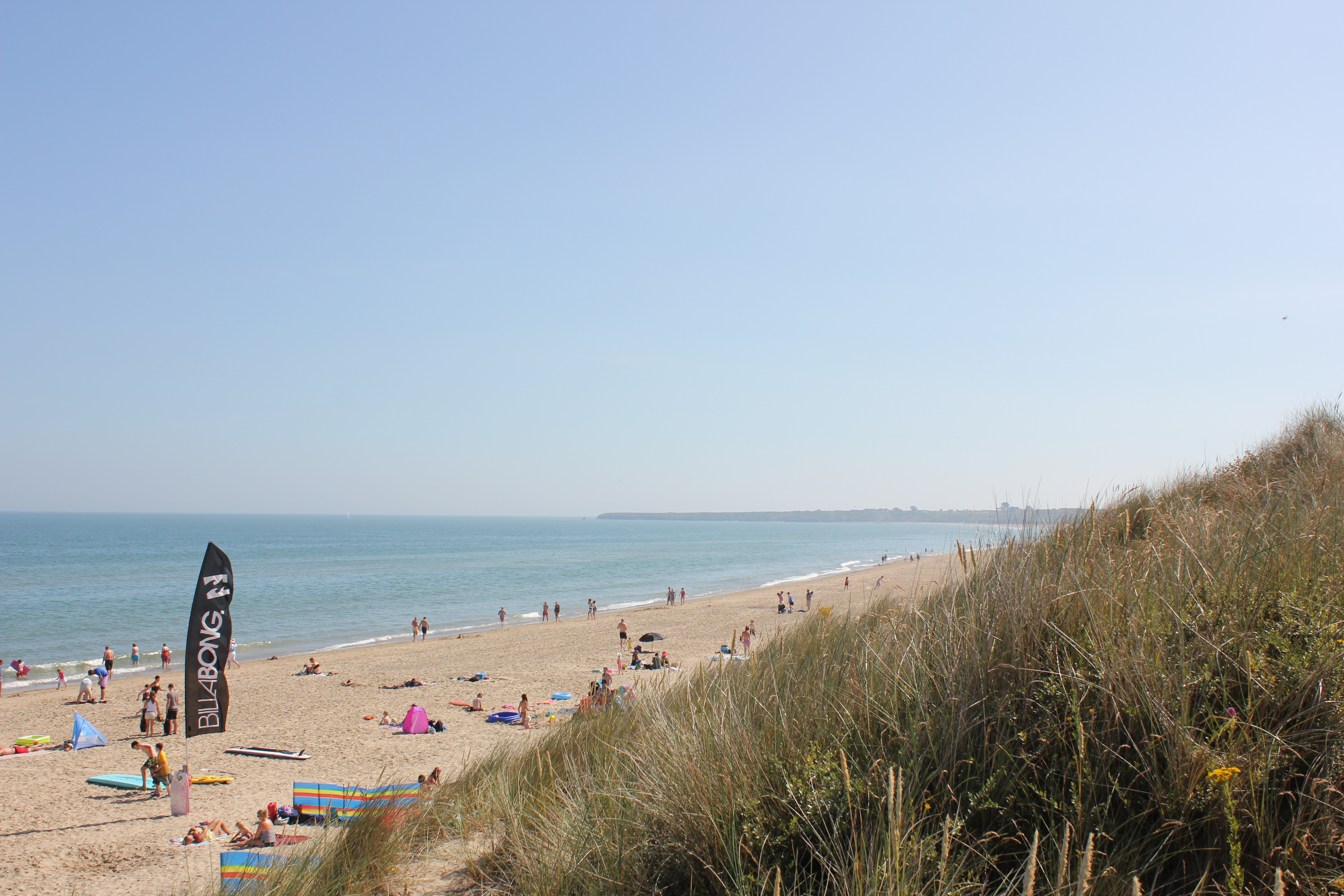
Beach at Brittas Bay. The county is a popular seaside destination

Wicklow has a relatively short coastline, at 64 kilometres (40 miles) in length. Wicklow's coastline is mostly straight, with few sizable bays or inlets and no offshore islands, giving it a shorter coastline than smaller counties like Louth and Dublin. Wicklow Head is the county's most prominent coastal headland, and is also the most easterly mainland point of the Republic of Ireland. Wicklow's east coast is a popular domestic summer holiday destination, and the county has numerous beaches including Brittas Bay, Clogga Beach, The Cove, Silver Strand Beach, Sallymount Bay Beach, Ennereilly Beach, Newcastle Beach, Arklow's Porter's Rock Beach and South Beach, Greystones North and South Beaches, Bray Strand, and Magheramore Beach.

=== Forest ===
The county has roughly 37,500 hectares (93,000 acres) of wooded area, the 8th highest total forest cover in Ireland. In terms of forest cover as a proportion of land area, Wicklow ranks second in the country, at 18.5%. Known as the "Garden of Ireland", Wicklow was historically the county with the highest percentage of woodlands. The 2017 National Forestry Inventory revealed that County Leitrim had overtaken it for the first time. Wicklow is in a temperate broadleaf and mixed forests biome, although the majority of Wicklow's forests are commercial conifers. The economic tree line in the region is around 400 metres (1,300 ft), above which hill farming and blanket bog dominates.

=== Urban development ===
In terms of urban development, Wicklow County Council imposes the most stringent planning restrictions in Ireland. In order to build a house outside of the main towns, a person must be "born and bred in the area, or have lived there for a period of 10 years" and must also demonstrate that the house is for their own housing needs, rather than for resale. Further, potential buyers in rural areas must be approved by the council before the homeowner is allowed to sell to them. The primary justification for these restrictions is to avoid one-off housing or other poorly planned developments which could put a strain on the county's infrastructure and degrade its natural environment.

=== Climate ===
Climate data for Ashford, County Wicklow (1999–2020), 12 mAOD
Month	Jan	Feb	Mar	Apr	May	Jun	Jul	Aug	Sep	Oct	Nov	Dec	Year
Record high °C (°F)	17.8 (64.0)	17.4 (63.3)	19.6 (67.3)	20.4 (68.7)	24.1 (75.4)	27.0 (80.6)	29.2 (84.6)	27.1 (80.8)	25.3 (77.5)	21.6 (70.9)	18.5 (65.3)	16.4 (61.5)	29.2 (84.6)
Mean daily maximum °C (°F)	9.2 (48.6)	9.4 (48.9)	11.2 (52.2)	12.8 (55.0)	15.7 (60.3)	18.7 (65.7)	20.4 (68.7)	19.8 (67.6)	18.1 (64.6)	14.9 (58.8)	11.6 (52.9)	9.6 (49.3)	14.3 (57.7)
Daily mean °C (°F)	6.1 (43.0)	6.1 (43.0)	7.1 (44.8)	8.8 (47.8)	11.4 (52.5)	14.0 (57.2)	15.6 (60.1)	15.5 (59.9)	13.9 (57.0)	11.3 (52.3)	8.2 (46.8)	6.4 (43.5)	10.4 (50.7)
Mean daily minimum °C (°F)	2.9 (37.2)	2.8 (37.0)	3.4 (38.1)	4.7 (40.5)	6.9 (44.4)	9.5 (49.1)	11.3 (52.3)	11.2 (52.2)	10.0 (50.0)	7.4 (45.3)	4.8 (40.6)	3.1 (37.6)	6.5 (43.7)
Record low °C (°F)	−7.1 (19.2)	−5.4 (22.3)	−6.6 (20.1)	−1.8 (28.8)	−0.8 (30.6)	1.8 (35.2)	4.6 (40.3)	4.3 (39.7)	1.9 (35.4)	−1.1 (30.0)	−6.4 (20.5)	−6.8 (19.8)	−7.1 (19.2)
Average rainfall mm (inches)	86 (3.4)	61.8 (2.43)	63.6 (2.50)	60.7 (2.39)	65.8 (2.59)	72.1 (2.84)	67 (2.6)	69.8 (2.75)	72.1 (2.84)	118.9 (4.68)	110.9 (4.37)	85.6 (3.37)	935 (36.8)
Average precipitation days (≥ 1 mm)	14	10	9	10	10	10	10	10	9	13	13	11	129
Mean monthly sunshine hours	68.0	83.2	136.8	180.4	204.0	197.7	171.0	158.5	135.9	103.3	77.7	65.9	1,582.4
Source 1: Met Éireann
Source 2: Ashford Weather Station

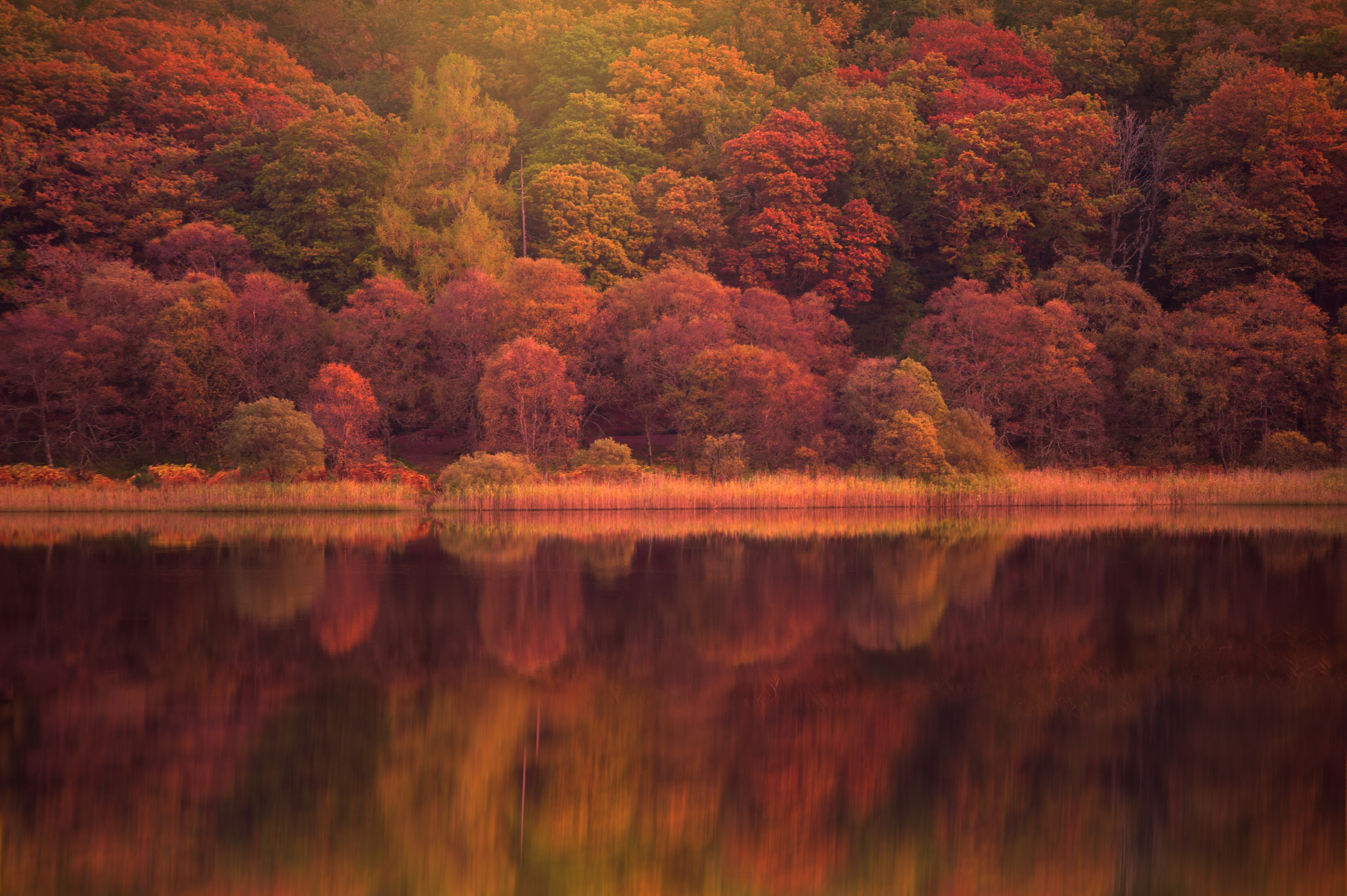
Autumn leaves at Upper Lake

The climate of Wicklow is temperate oceanic (Köppen climate classification Cfb in most areas, and Cfc oceanic subpolar in some highland areas), with cool, humid summers, and mild, wet winters. The climate of the eastern portion of the county is moderated by the Irish Sea and averages milder winters and cooler summers, while the western inland portion along the Kildare border experiences warmer summers and colder winters. The county's upland interior experiences significantly lower temperatures and higher rainfall year-round. Snow typically falls from December to March, but most low-lying and coastal areas see only a few days of lying snow per year, or may see no snow at all during some winters. The Wicklow Mountains region is the snowiest part of Ireland and can experience 50 or more days of snowfall each year.

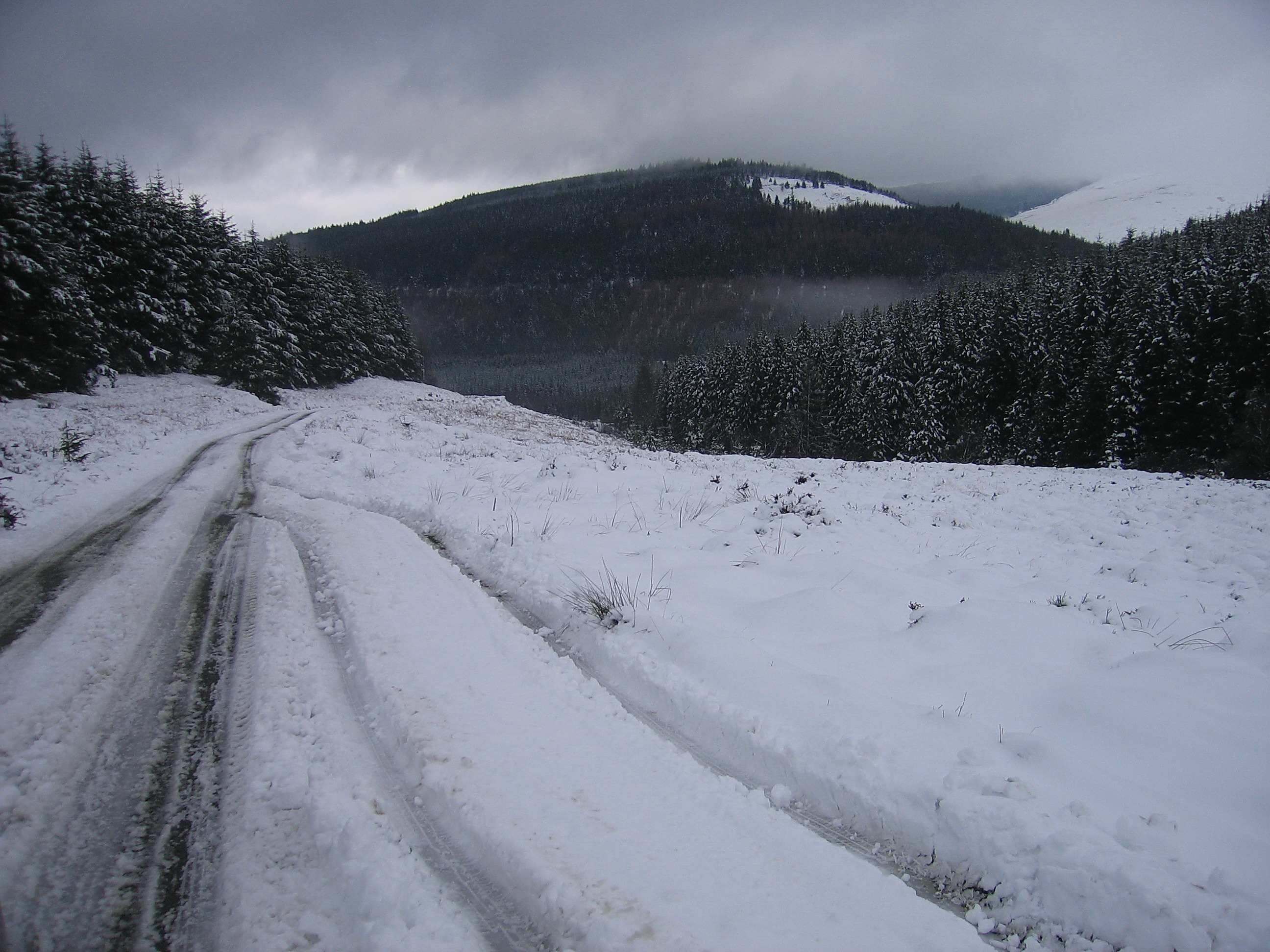
On average, Wicklow receives more snowfall than any other county

The county experiences a narrow annual temperature range. Typical daytime highs range from 17–22 °C (63–72 °F) throughout the county in July and August, with overnight lows in the 11–14 °C (52–57 °F) range, although temperatures in the mountains can be 5–10 °C (41–50 °F) lower. Mean January temperatures range from 7 °C (45 °F) on the coast to 0 °C (32 °F) at high elevations. Precipitation is fairly evenly distributed throughout the year, although the wettest months (October and November) receive roughly twice as much rain as the driest months (February, March and April). The driest area of Wicklow is the northeast corner of the county, which is protected from the prevailing south-westerly winds by the Wicklow Mountains and receives around 750 mm (30 in) of rainfall per year. The coastal region of County Dublin immediately to the north is the driest location in all of Ireland as a result of the rain shadow created by the mountains.

Easterly winds can occur between February and May, and are often associated with extreme snowfall events such as the 2018 "Beast from the East" and the "Big Snow of 1947". Much of Wicklow is very vulnerable to heavy snowfall and the county is typically the hardest hit by such events, with some areas recording over 2 feet (61 cm) of snow. During the winter of 1947, residents of Rathdrum called upon the Irish Red Cross to drop them food parcels by plane as the village had been inaccessible by road for over a month due to heavy snow.

Wicklow is occasionally affected by hurricanes, although they are usually extratropical storms by the time they reach Ireland. On 24 August 1986, during Hurricane Charley, 280 mm (11 in) of rain fell over a 24-hour period at Kippure on the Wicklow-Dublin border, the greatest daily rainfall total ever recorded in Ireland. The hurricane caused severe flooding and up to 1,000 homes had to be evacuated in Bray alone. Other major floods in Wicklow which resulted in loss of life occurred in 1886–87, 1931, 1965 and 2011.

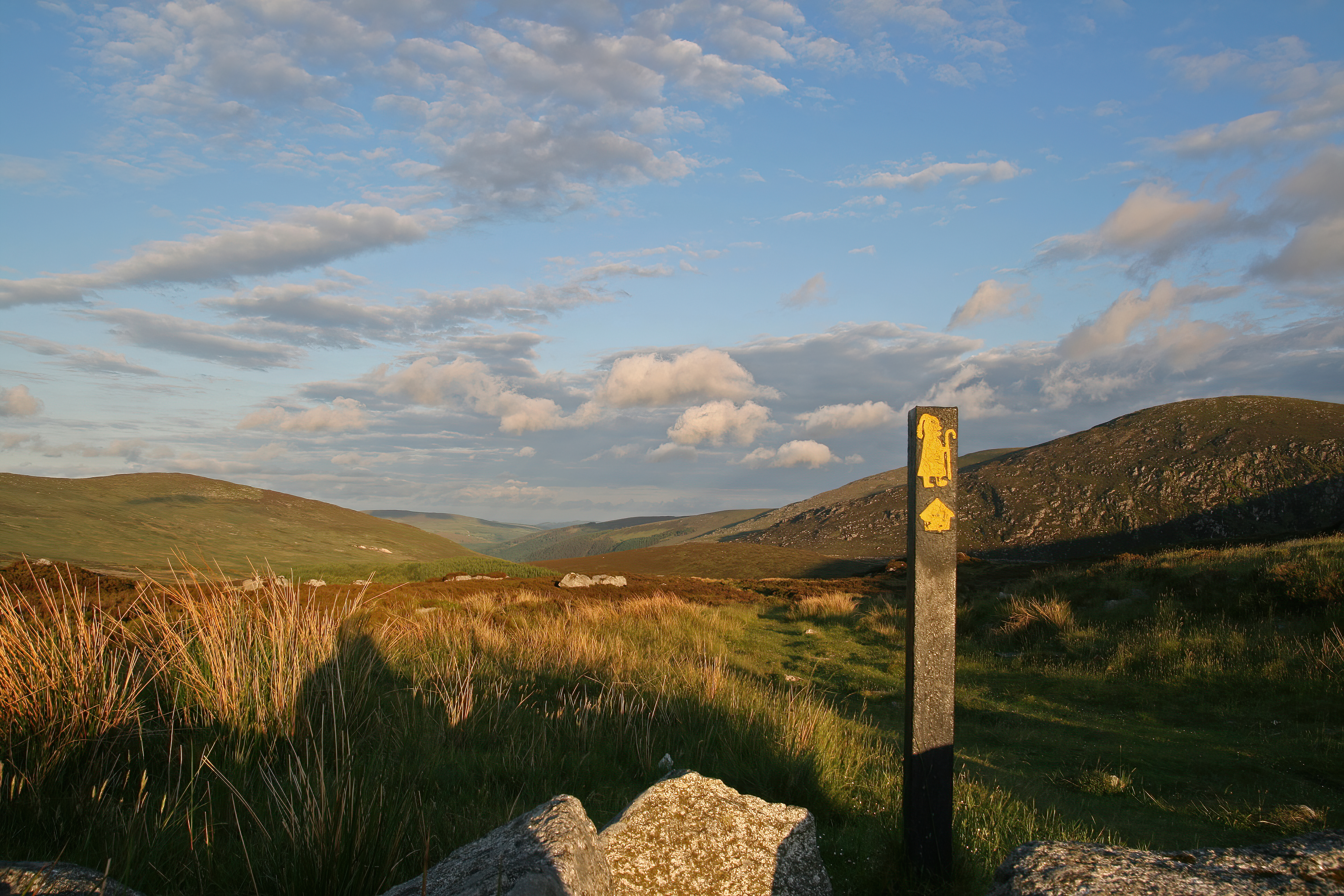
Hiking waymakers, such as this one for Saint Kevin's Way, dot the Wicklow landscape

=== Subdivisions ===
==== Baronies ====
There are eight historic baronies in the county. While baronies continue to be officially defined units, they are no longer used for administrative purposes. Their official status is illustrated by Placenames Orders made since 2003, where official Irish names of baronies are listed under "Administrative units". The largest barony in Wicklow is Lower Talbotstown, at 88,704 acres (359 km^{2}), and the smallest barony is Rathdown, at 33,463 acres (135 km^{2}).

- Arklow (An tInbhear Mór)
- Ballinacor North (Baile na Corra Thuaidh)
- Ballinacor South (Baile na Corra Theas)
- Newcastle (An Caisleán Nua)
- Rathdown (Ráth an Dúin)
- Shillelagh (Síol Éalaigh)
- Lower Talbotstown (Baile an Talbóidigh Íochtarach)
- Upper Talbotstown (Baile an Talbóidigh Uachtarach)

==== Towns and villages ====
- Aghavannagh
- Annacurra
- Annamoe
- Arklow
- Ashford
- Aughrim
- Avoca
- Ballinaclash
- Ballinakil
- Baltinglass
- Blessington
- Bray
- Brittas Bay
- Carnew
- Coolafancy
- Coolboy
- Coolkenno
- Delgany
- Donard
- Dunlavin
- Enniskerry
- Glencree
- Glendalough
- Glenealy
- Grangecon
- Greenan
- Greystones
- Hollywood
- Kilbride
- Kilcoole
- Killincarrig
- Kilmacanogue
- Kilpedder
- Kiltegan
- Knockananna
- Lacken
- Laragh
- Manor Kilbride
- Meeting of the Waters
- Newcastle
- Newtownmountkennedy
- Poulaphouca
- Rathnew
- Rathdrum
- Redcross
- Roundwood
- Shillelagh
- Stratford-on-Slaney
- Tinahely
- Valleymount
- Wicklow
- Woodenbridge

== Demographics ==
=== Population ===
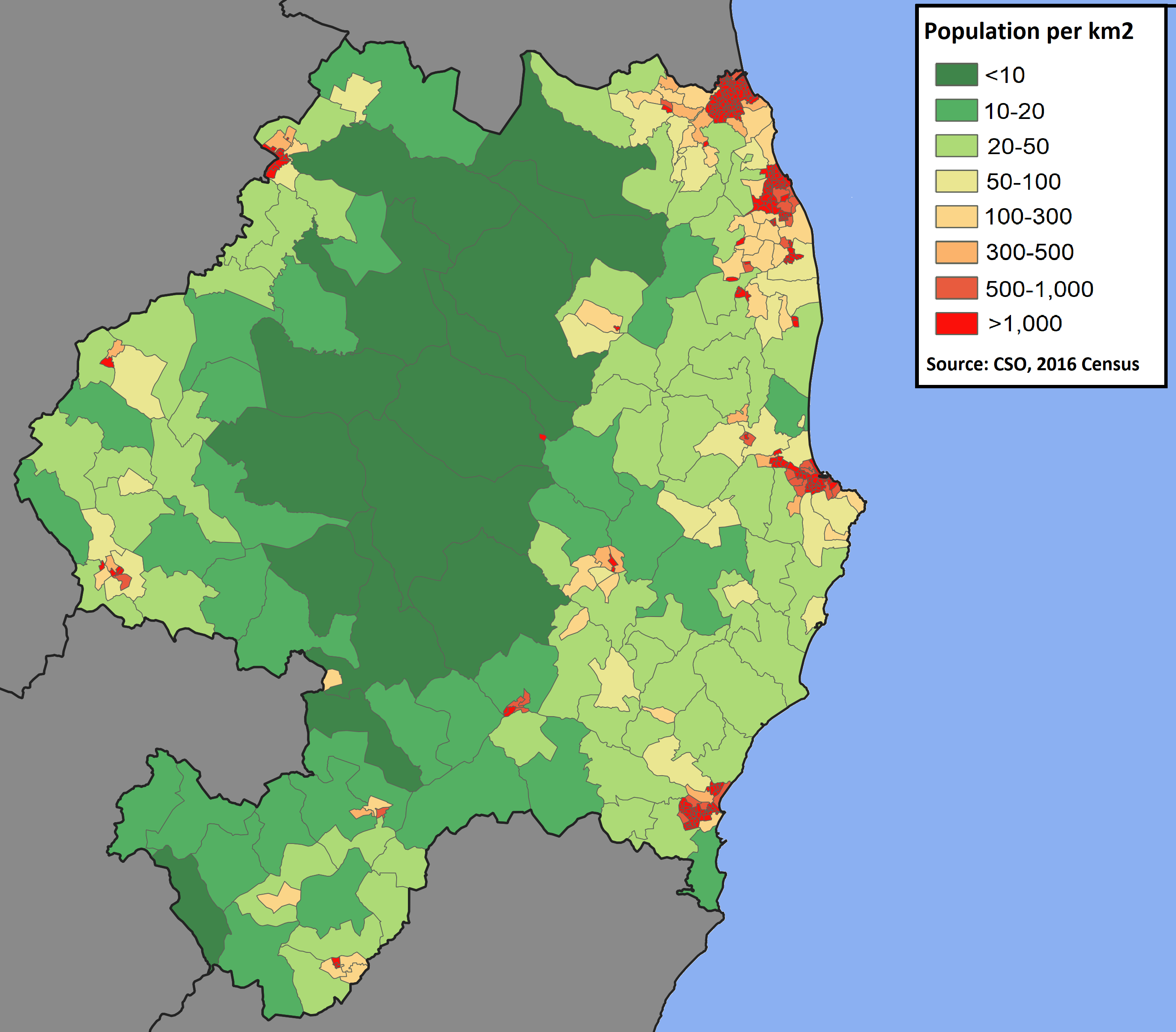
Wicklow's population is primarily concentrated along the east coast

Historical population
Year	Pop.	±%
1659	6,066	—
1821	110,767	+1726.0%
1831	121,557	+9.7%
1841	126,143	+3.8%
1851	98,979	−21.5%
1861	86,479	−12.6%
1871	78,697	−9.0%
1881	70,386	−10.6%
1891	62,136	−11.7%
1901	60,824	−2.1%
1911	60,711	−0.2%
1926	57,591	−5.1%
1936	58,569	+1.7%
1946	60,451	+3.2%
1951	62,590	+3.5%
1956	59,906	−4.3%
1961	58,473	−2.4%
1966	60,428	+3.3%
1971	66,295	+9.7%
1979	83,950	+26.6%
1981	87,449	+4.2%
1986	94,542	+8.1%
1991	97,265	+2.9%
1996	102,683	+5.6%
2002	114,676	+11.7%
2006	126,194	+10.0%
2011	136,640	+8.3%
2016	142,425	+4.2%
2022	155,485	+9.2%

As of the 2016 census, the resident population of Wicklow was 142,425, a 4.2% increase since the Census of Ireland 2011. The county's population is one of the fastest growing in the country, increasing 38.7 percent in the 20 years between 1996 and 2016. However, its share of the Mid East's population has steadily fallen as Meath and Kildare have experienced even more rapid population growth. While Bray remains by far the largest town in the county, improved transport links to Dublin such as upgrades to the M11 and the completion of the M50 in 2005 encouraged the growth of towns further south. Between 2002 and 2016 Bray grew by 5.3 percent. By contrast, over the same period Arklow grew by 32.2 percent, Greystones grew by 53.3 percent and Rathnew grew by 133.9%.

The most densely populated areas of the county are concentrated in the northeast, with over 50 percent of Wicklow's residents living within 15 kilometres (9 mi) of the Dublin border. Many of the county's largest urban areas are clustered in this region along an axis stretching from Bray to Newtownmountkennedy, which incorporates Greystones, Delgany, Enniskerry, Kilmacanogue, Kilpedder and Kilcoole. Outside of this region, Wicklow, Rathnew and Arklow are the only sizable towns in the eastern portion of the county, while Blessington is the only large settlement in west Wicklow.

The county's interior is very sparsely populated, with only a few small settlements located in the foothills of the Wicklow Mountains such as Rathdrum, Laragh, Roundwood and Tinahely. Most small areas in central Wicklow have a population density of less than 20 people per km^{2}, compared with an average of 77 people per km^{2} in the county as a whole.

The gender makeup of the county in 2016 was 50.74% female and 49.26% male. 29.0% of the population were under the age of 19; 58% were between the ages of 19 and 64; and 13.0% were 65 years of age or older.

Wicklow ethnic composition of population
Ethnicity	Population (2016)	Percentage
White	134,274	95.2%
Asian	2,310	1.6%
Others including mixed	1,659	1.2%
Black	524	0.4%
Not stated	2,313	1.6%

Whites of any ethnic background constituted 95.2% of the population in 2016: 86.0% were White Irish, 0.6% Irish Traveller, and 8.6% White of any other background.

Asians were the second largest ethnic group, comprising 1.6% of the county's population, followed by mixed race or other backgrounds at 1.2%. Just over 2,300 people (1.6%) did not state their ethnicity.

Accounting for just 0.4% of the population, Wicklow has by far the lowest percentage of black residents in the Greater Dublin Area. The 2016 census recorded 524 black residents in Wicklow, of which 408 (78%) were of African descent and 116 (22%) were of other black backgrounds.

=== Urban areas ===
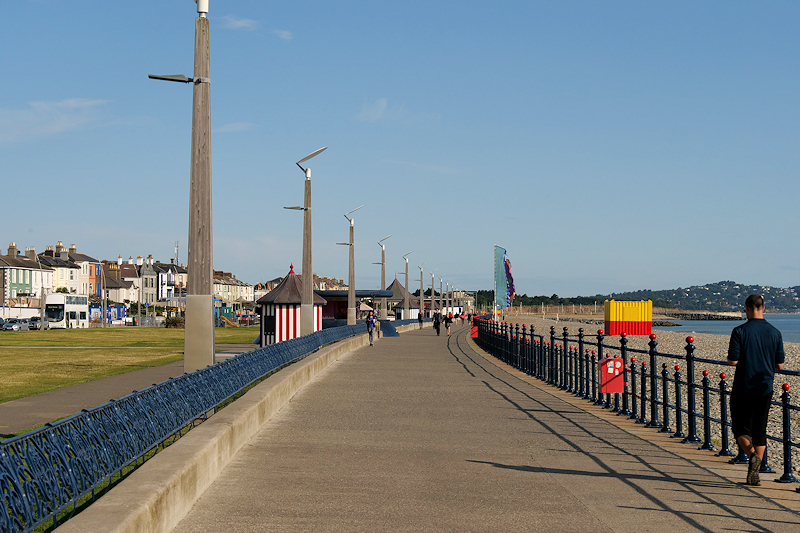
Bray

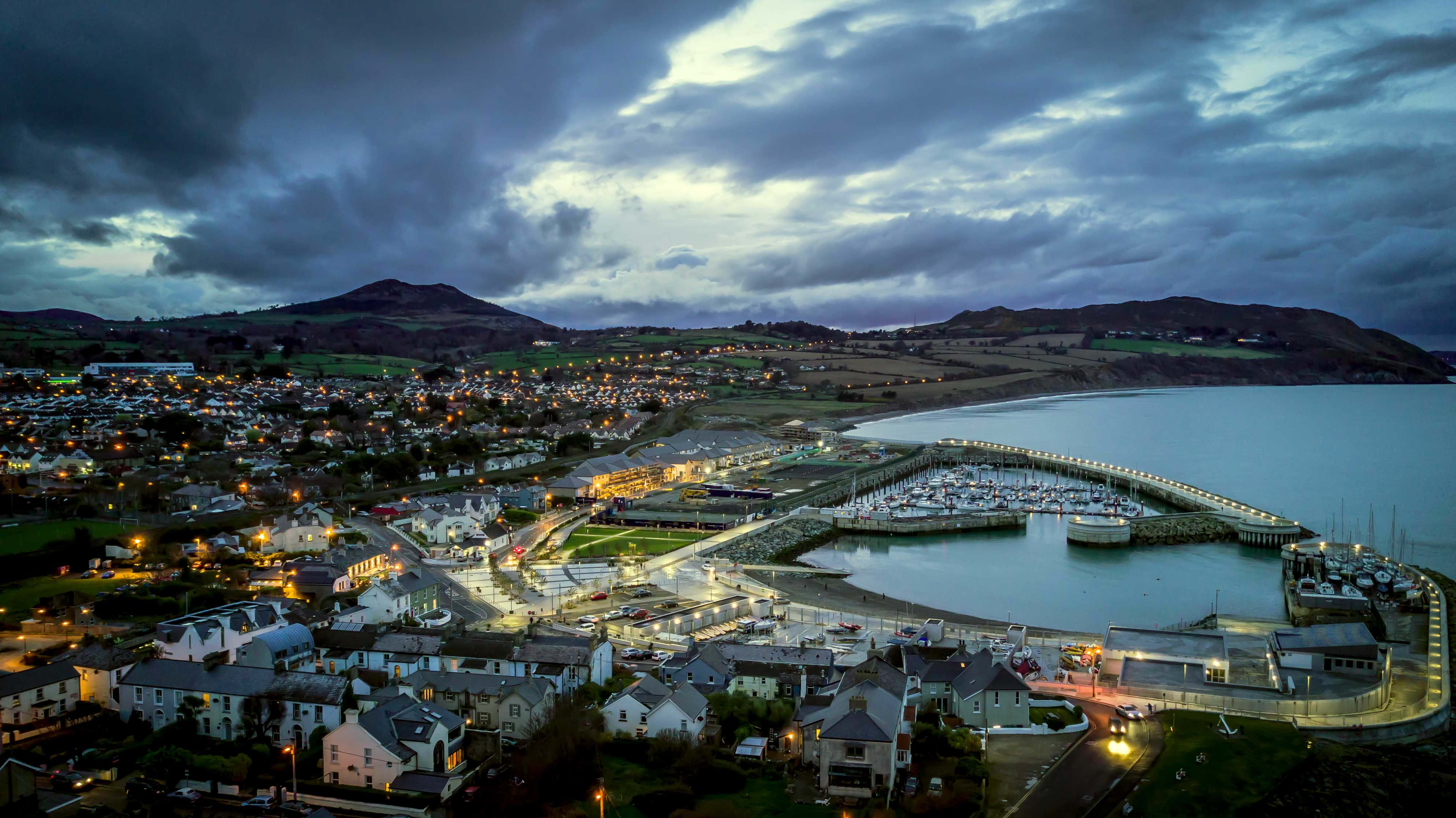
Greystones

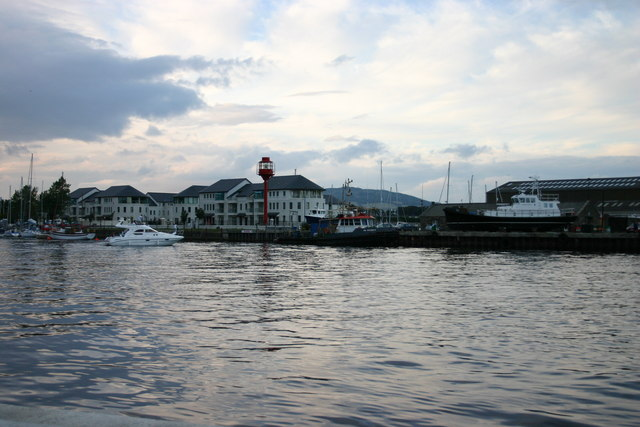
Arklow

The 2016 census recorded that 65 percent of County Wicklow's residents lived in urban areas (settlements with a population greater than 1,500) and 35 percent lived in rural areas. Of County Wicklow's rural population, roughly 26 percent (36,800 people) live in the open countryside outside of any designated settlements, while 9 percent (13,032 people) live in settlements with less than 1,500 people. According to the CSO report Urban and Rural Life in Ireland 2019, County Wicklow (alongside County Kildare) has the highest proportion of residents living in satellite towns.

The 10 largest settlements in the county are listed below. The county town is marked in bold.

Most populous settlements in County Wicklow
Rank	City	Population (2022)
1	Bray (Note: Part in County Dublin.)	33,512
2	Greystones–Delgany	22,009
3	Arklow	13,399
4	**Wicklow**	12,957
5	Blessington (Note: Part in County Kildare.)	5,611
6	Kilcoole	4,569
7	Newtownmountkennedy	3,539
8	Rathnew	3,482
9	Rathdrum	2,264
10	Enniskerry	2,000

=== Migration ===
As of 2016, around 85% of Wicklow's population was born within the Republic of Ireland, and a further 0.9% was born in Northern Ireland. Just over 38% of Wicklow's usually resident population was born within the county, making it the second least indigenous county in Ireland, after Meath. While around 35% of the county's population was born in neighbouring Dublin, it is likely that a significant portion of these are Wicklow natives who were born in one of Dublin's many hospitals.

People born in the United Kingdom are by far the largest immigrant group, comprising 5.9% of Wicklow's population (8,388 people). Of this group, only around half (4,045 people) stated that they were either UK or dual Irish-UK citizens. The Poles are the second largest immigrant group, constituting 2.0% of the county's population. The census recorded 2,905 Polish citizens in Wicklow, of which 2,759 were born in Poland. The fastest growing major immigrant groups between 2011 and 2016 were Romanians, Indians and Filipinos. There was also a large increase in the number of Brazilians (+107%), Italians (+59%) and Spaniards (+53%) living in Wicklow over this period.

Main immigrant groups, 2016
Country of birth	United Kingdom	Poland	United States	Lithuania	Philippines	Romania	India	Germany	South Africa	China*
Population (2016)	8,388	2,759	849	767	644	624	498	458	409	404
% of total population	5.9%	2.0%	0.6%	0.5%	0.46%	0.44%	0.35%	0.32%	0.29%	0.29%
% of immigrant population	39.8%	13.1%	4.0%	3.6%	3.1%	3.0%	2.4%	2.2%	1.9%	1.9%
Change since 2011	−203 ( 2.4%)	164 ( 6.3%)	10 ( 1.2%)	−45 ( 5.5%)	73 ( 12.8%)	309 ( 98.1%)	107 ( 27.4%)	10 ( 2.2%)	−27 ( 6.2%)	−45 ( 10.0%)

*Includes Hong Kong SAR

=== Religion ===
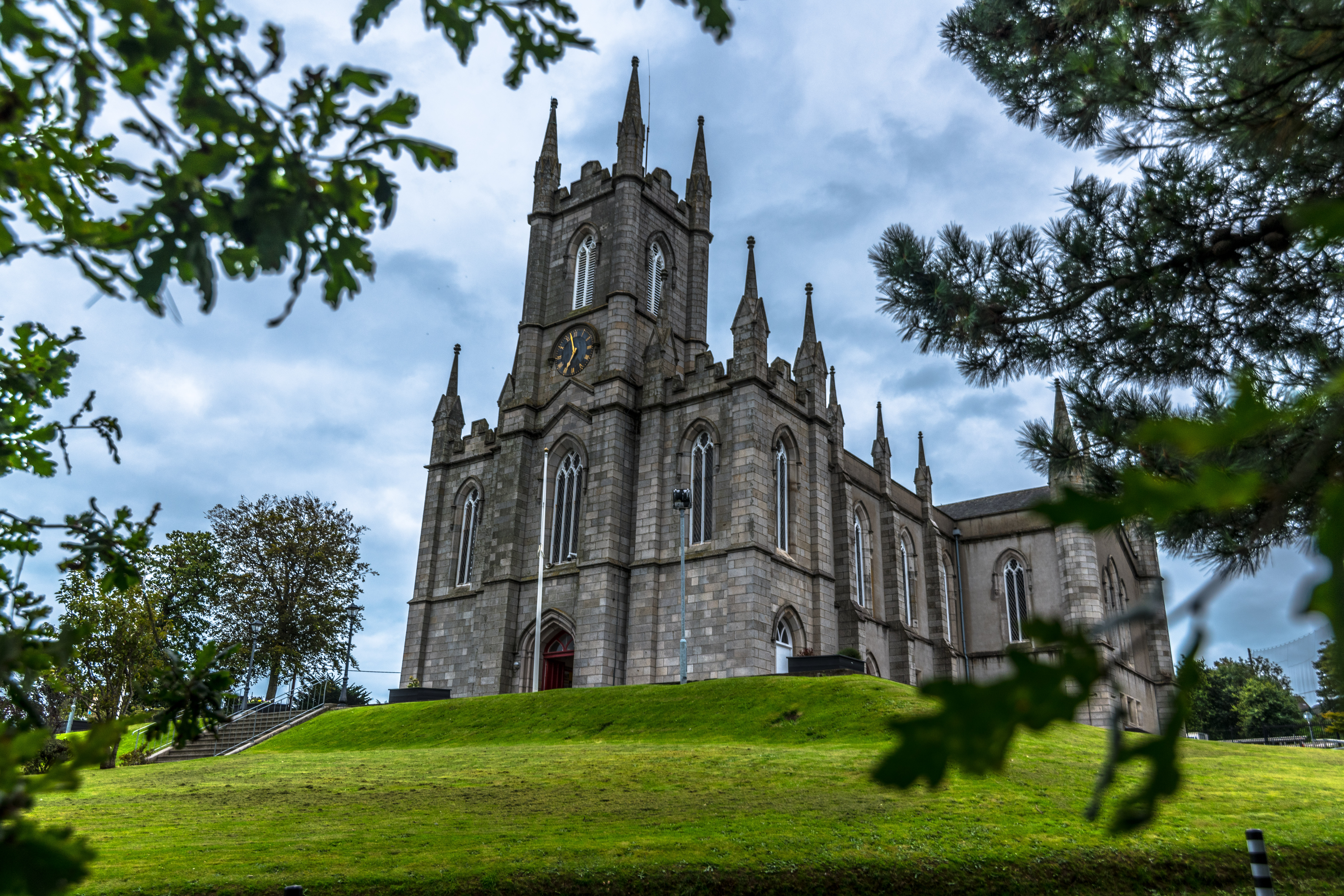
St. Patrick's Church, Wicklow

Religion in County Wicklow (2016)
Affiliation	Percent
Catholic	73.0%
No religion	13.3%
Other Christian	8.8%
Other stated religions	3.1%
Not stated	1.8%

The 2016 census showed that religious affiliation in Wicklow was as follows: Catholic 73%, Irreligion 13.3%, Other Christian 8.8%, Other stated religions 3.1%, and not stated 1.8%.

The single largest religious denomination in 2016 was the Roman Catholic Church, with 103,947 adherents. This is a 4.4% decrease from the 2011 census. Catholicism in Wicklow reached its peak percentage in the 1961 census, when 87.5% of the population identified as Catholic. As of 2016, Wicklow is the second least Catholic county in the State, and among the most irreligious.

Other Christian denominations comprised 8.8% of the population. As a proportion of population, Wicklow has the largest Church of Ireland affiliation of any county in the Republic of Ireland, at 6.2%, although this figure was historically much higher. The 1901 census recorded that just under 20% of Wicklow's population was affiliated with the Church of Ireland. In 2016 Greystones had the highest percentage of Protestants in the State (10.5%), and was also Ireland's least religious town, with 18.3% of residents stating they did not follow any religion.

Just over 0.5% of the population adhered to smaller Protestant denominations such as Presbyterian, Apostolic and Pentecostal. A further 1.05% of respondents stated that they were "Christian" but did not specify any denomination. Eastern Orthodox is the fastest growing of the major Christian denominations, increasing from 840 adherents in 2011 to 1,317 in 2016, a 56.7% increase.

The largest non-Christian religions were Islam (0.4%) and Hinduism (0.16%). All other stated religions constituted 2.5% of the population, and 1.8% of respondents did not state their religion.

== Economy ==
=== Built environment ===
Wicklow is home to several major water supply and hydroelectric facilities. The Turlough Hill pumped-storage scheme, a significant civil engineering project, was carried out in the mountains in the 1960s and 1970s.

=== Leisure and tourism ===
Wicklow, often called "The Garden of Ireland", has been a popular tourist destination for many years, due to its scenery, beaches, walking, hiking and climbing options, and attractions including the ruins of the monastic city of Glendalough, Wicklow Gaol and water-based activities on reservoirs and the coast.

The Wicklow Way is the oldest waymarked long-distance walking trail in Ireland.

The popular annual mass participation bike ride Wicklow 200 has taken place in the county every year since 1982.

The county is also home to the historic Avoca mill (founded in 1723), which operates as a working textile mill and tourist destination.

== Governance and politics ==
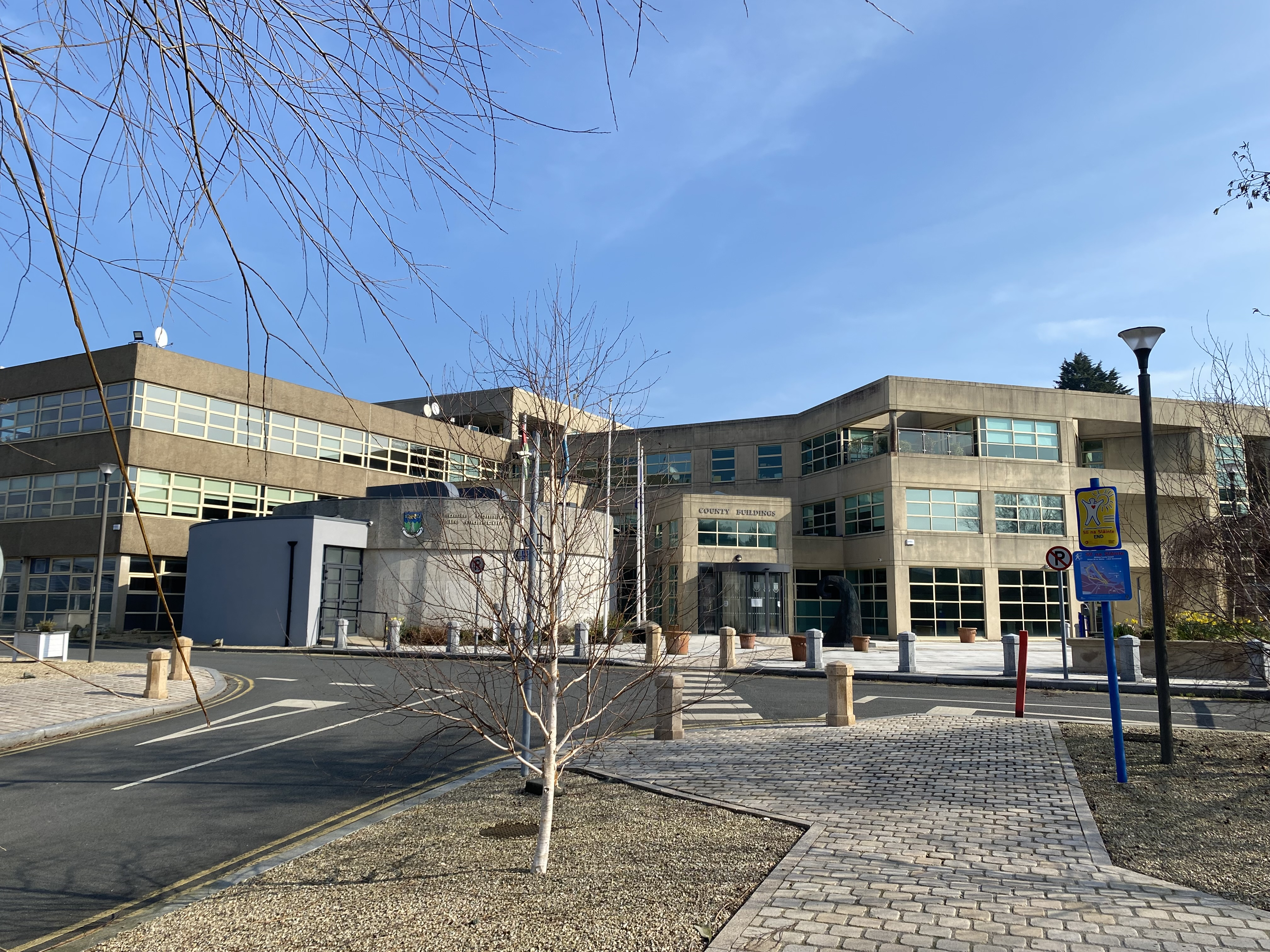
County Buildings, Wicklow

=== Local government ===
The local government authority is Wicklow County Council which returns 32 councillors from six local electoral areas: Arklow, Baltinglass, Bray East, Bray West, Greystones, and Wicklow. Wicklow County Council sends three members to the Eastern and Midland Regional Assembly, where it is part of the Eastern Strategic Planning Area.

Political Party	Members
Fine Gael	9
Fianna Fáil	4
Social Democrats	3
Sinn Féin	2
Green	2
Labour	1
Independent Ireland	1
Independent	10

=== Former districts ===
County Wicklow was formerly divided into the rural districts of Baltinglass No. 1, Rathdown No. 2, Rathdrum, and Shillelagh, and the urban districts of Arklow, Bray and Wicklow. The rural districts were abolished in 1925. Greystones, in the former rural district of Rathdown No. 2, was given town commissioners in 1984. The urban districts of Arklow, Bray and Wicklow and the town commissioners of Greystones became town councils in 2002. All town councils in Ireland were abolished in 2014.

=== National politics ===
The whole county is in the Dáil constituency of Wicklow (5 seats).

TD	Party
John Brady	Sinn Féin
Jennifer Whitmore	Social Democrats
Simon Harris	Fine Gael
Stephen Donnelly	Fianna Fáil
Steven Matthews	Green

== Transportation ==
=== Road ===
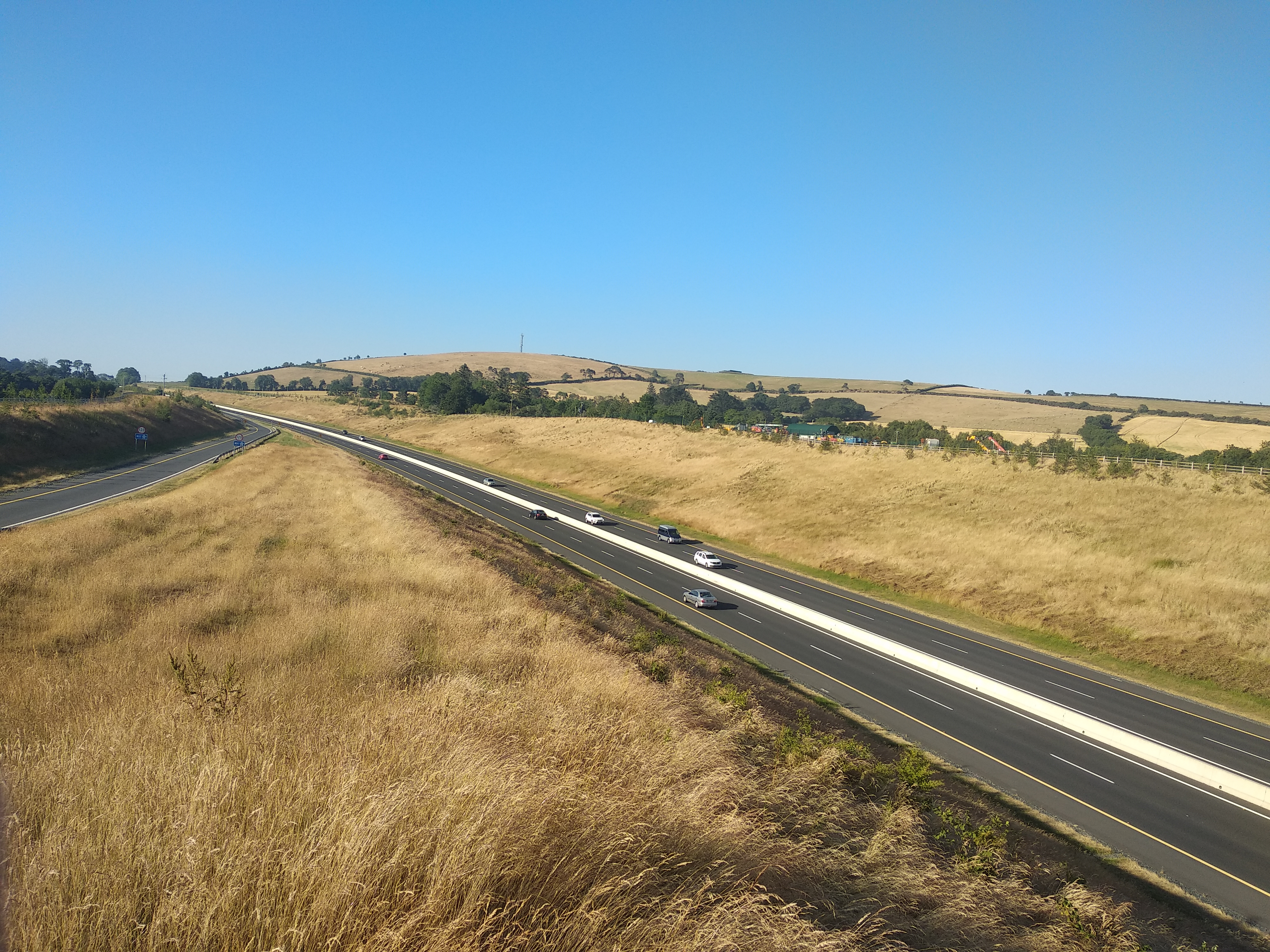
M11 motorway south of Wicklow town

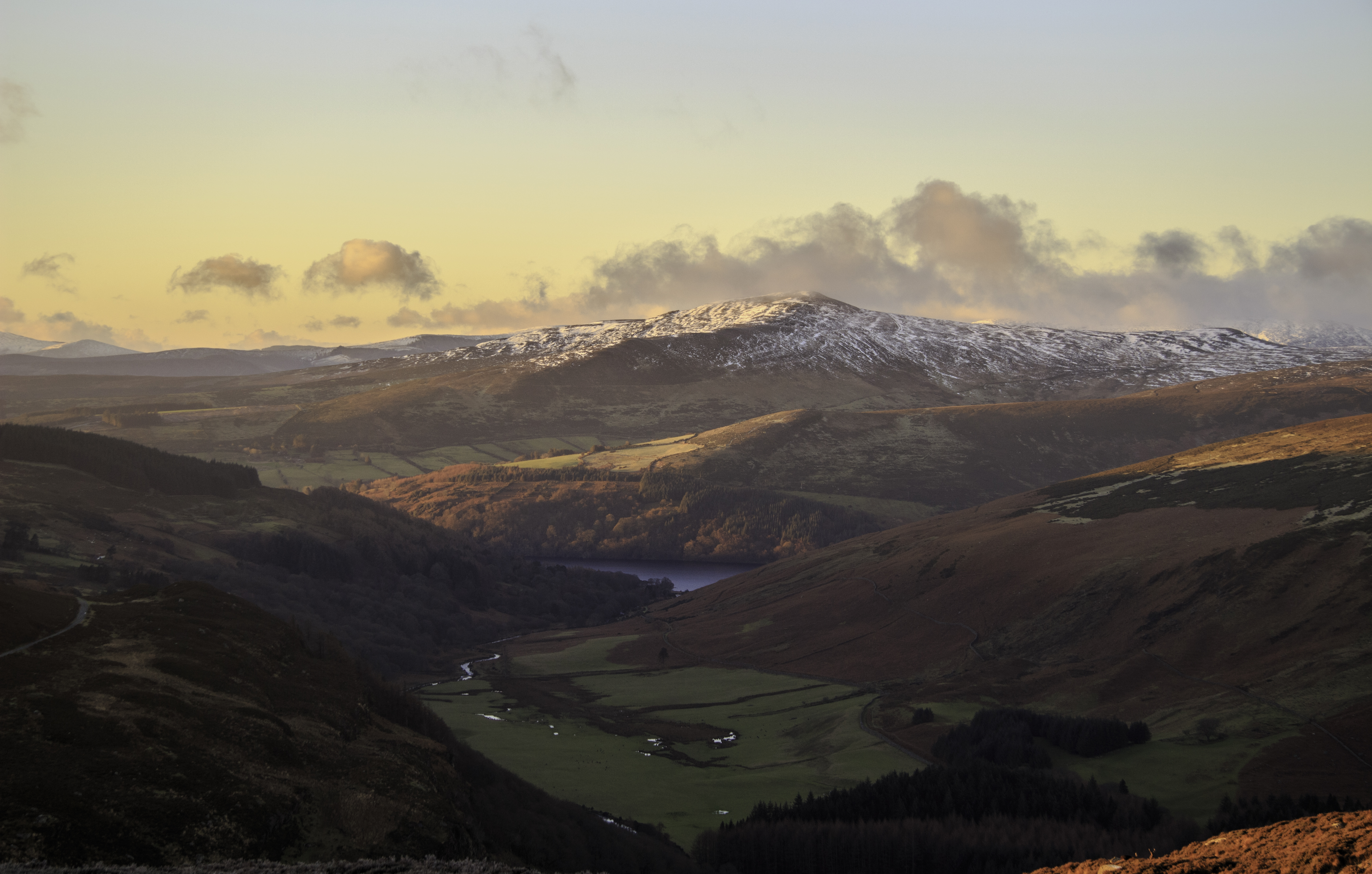
View from the Sally Gap along the R759

Wicklow has a well-maintained network of regional roads which connect the county's western portion to its eastern portion, cross-cutting the Wicklow Mountains from east to west. Several north-south regional roads also traverse the mountains, providing amenity access to the county's interior.

The county is also serviced by a National secondary road (N81) in western Wicklow, and a National primary road (N11) in eastern Wicklow which becomes a motorway at Junction 14 north of Ashford. The N11/M11 is the main route used by Wicklow commuters heading northbound to Dublin. Southbound traffic can also be heavy on weekends due to the influx of Dublin visitors into Wicklow and Wexford.

Major routes include:

- N11/M11 – Runs near the east coast for 129 km (80 mi), linking Dublin and Wexford. Becomes the M11 at Junction 14 north of Ashford.
- N81 – National secondary road that runs from Dublin to Tullow, crossing through western Wicklow from Blessington to Baltinglass.
- R115 – Ireland's highest paved mountain pass. Follows the route of the old Military Road, constructed by the British Army from 1800 to 1809 to put down insurgents in the Wicklow mountains. Terminates at Laragh.
- R412 – Regional road that runs north–south from the outskirts of Naas, crossing through western Wicklow for 8 km (5.0 mi), terminating at the N81 near Loughmogue.
- R725 – 53 km (33 mi) long regional road that crosses the Wicklow Mountains from east to west, connecting Gorey to Carlow.
- R747 – Crosses the southern foothills of the Wicklow Mountains through Tinahely, connecting Arklow to Ballitore.
- R750 – Runs for 30 km (19 mi) in eastern Wicklow from Rathnew to the northern outskirts of Arklow.
- R755 – North-south regional road that runs for 36 km (22 mi) from the N11 at Kilmacanogue to Rathdrum.
- R756 – Runs west-east through the Wicklow Gap for 32 km (20 mi) from Dunlavin to Laragh, intersecting the N81 at the village of Hollywood. The section from Hollywood to Laragh is known as the Wicklow Gap Road.
- R759 – Runs south-east to north-west through the Sally Gap. The road is 27 km (17 mi) in length, and in winter can be dangerous or impassable as it is not treated by the Local Authority.
- R761 – 25 km (16 mi) long regional road that runs through several settlements in northeastern Wicklow (Bray, Greystones, Kilcoole, Newcastle) south to Rathnew.

== Culture ==
=== Architecture ===
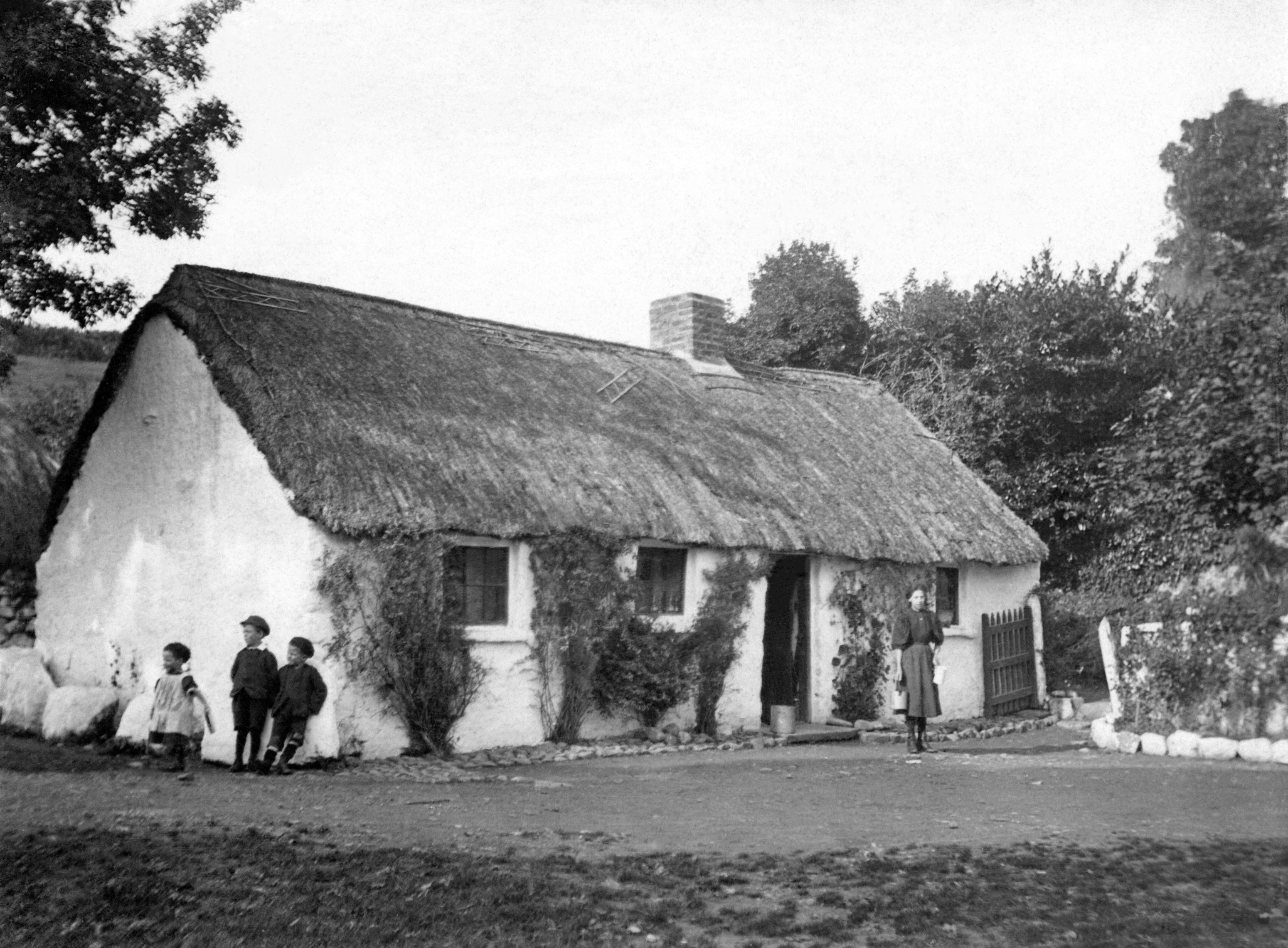
A thatched cottage on the Dublin-Wicklow border circa 1895

The vernacular architecture of County Wicklow conformed to that of Ireland as a whole. Unlike neighbouring County Wexford however, Wicklow was not a county generally associated with thatched roofing. Historian Christiaan Corlett contends that thatch was "formerly very common in Wicklow until about the 1930s", when afterwards "during the 1930s, 40s and 50s the fashion in Wicklow was to replace thatch roofs with galvanised ones". Sometimes the old thatched roof was kept in place underneath the sheets of galvanising to act as a layer of insulation and dampen the noise of heavy rain.

=== Arts ===
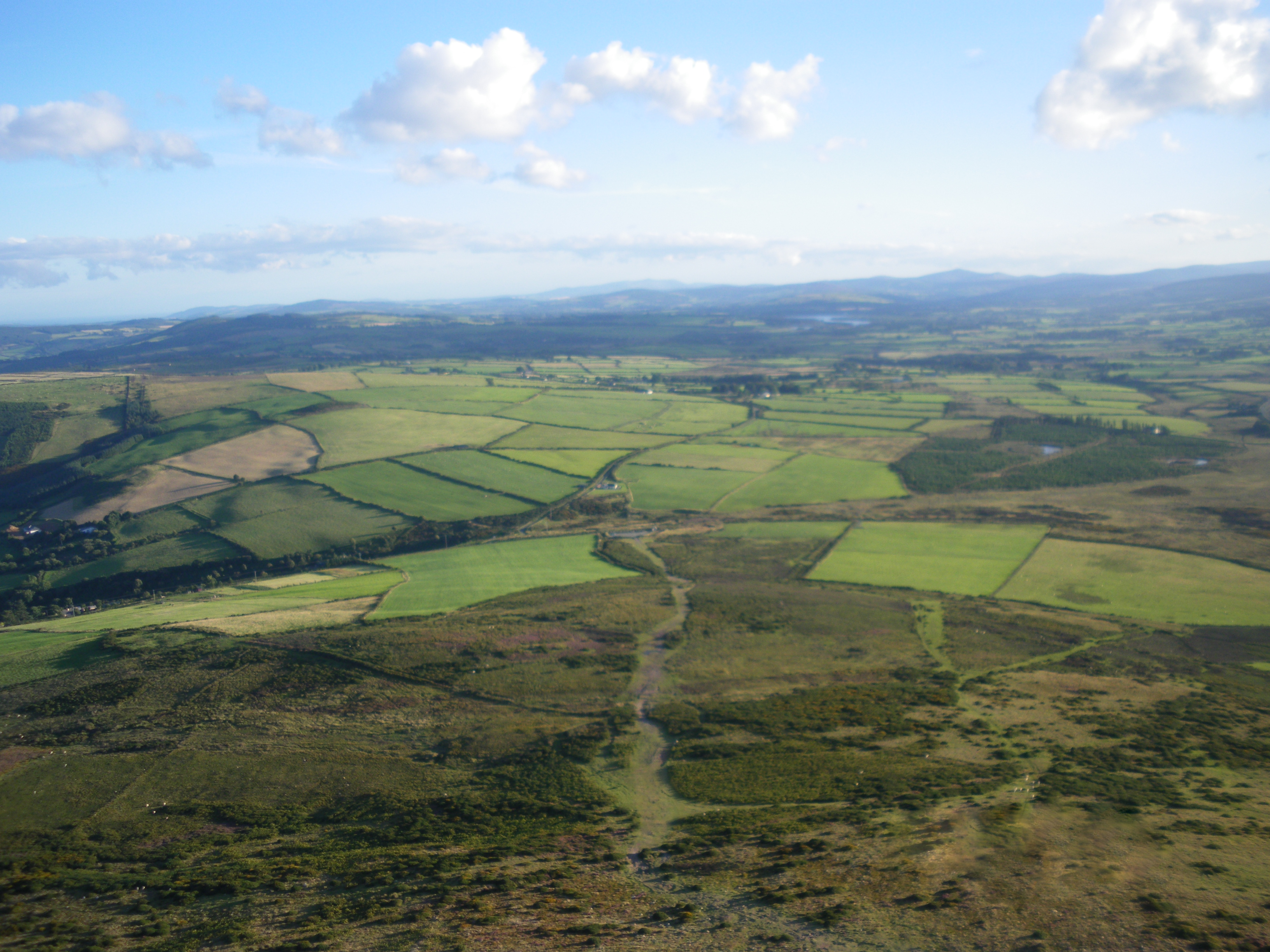
Lowlands in east Wicklow, west of Greystones.

Mermaid, County Wicklow Arts Centre is based in Bray. Mermaid is the county's hub of artistic activity and creation, offering a programme in many art forms: visual arts, theatre productions, opera, dance performances, arthouse cinema, comedy and a music programme. Two of the county's festivals take place in Arklow, the Arklow Music Festival and the Arklow Seabreeze Festival.

The county is a popular film-making location in Ireland. Bray is home to Ardmore Studios, where many of Ireland's best known feature films, including John Boorman's Excalibur and Zardoz, Jim Sheridan's Oscar-winning In the Name of the Father, Rawhead Rex, and several Neil Jordan films, have been shot. The BBC series Ballykissangel was also filmed in County Wicklow. Scenes from the movie P.S. I Love You were shot in the Wicklow Mountains National Park while several scenes from other movies, from Barry Lyndon to Haywire, have been filmed in the county.

== Sport ==
=== Gaelic Games ===
The GAA was first established in Wicklow in the 1880s , with the first county convention taking place in 1886 represetning over 30 clubs. The main sport was always Gaelic Football but Hurling and Camoige emerged in larger towns. Today their are 38 recognised GAA clubs in the county. 2 clubs form Wicklow have won on the National scale being , Bray Emmets who won the All Ireland Senior Football Championship, doing so in 1902 while competing in Dublin and Baltinglass winning the All Ireland Senior Clun Football Championship in 1990

Although the long history in the GAA , Wicklow GAA has never won the All Ireland Championship in any sport, male or female. In recent years however the county teams have been doing a lot better. In 2023 the womens camoige team won the All ireland Junior B championship, beating Mayo in the final. They went on to win the trophy again in 2024 .In 2026 the Men's Football team won the Tailtean Cup in 2026 beating Down in the final.

=== Football ===
Football in the county is managed by the Wiclow District Football League (WDFL) and it is a important organisation in providing grassroots and amatur football. Their are 17 offical Clubs in Wicklow.

Bray Wanders is Wicklows only League of Ireland Club. They play at the Carlisle Grounds in Bray. In their history they have won the FAI Cup twice and the First Divsion 3 times. They have comepted in Europe twice in the UEFA Cups Winners Cup and the UEFA Cup

=== Golf ===
Wicklow has 6 championship golf coares. Druids Glen Golf Coarse in Newtownmountkennedy hosted the Irish Open for four consecutive years (1996-1999) and it hosted the Seve Trophy in 2002

3 courses have held the Irish PGA Championship. The European Club hosted between 2007 and 2009.Tiger Woods holds the record here. Powerscort Golf Club hosted in 1998 and Druids Heath Golf Coarse hosted in 2006

Woodbrook Golf Club has also hosted the Irish Open in 1975 and hosted 6 edtions of the Irish PGA Championship. Technically it is on the Dubin-Wicklow border but uses a Bray Address

== Media ==
- Local newspapers include The Bray People, Wicklow Times and Wicklow People.
- WicklowNews.net is a popular news website in the county. See Wicklow News.
- The local radio station in Wicklow is East Coast FM. In 2010, Radio Nova became the second local radio service to be licensed for North Wicklow. The station broadcasts to Bray, Greystones, Kilmacanogue, Enniskerry and Blessington, in addition to Dublin, North Kildare and South Meath. It broadcasts to North Wicklow on 95.7 from Bray Head and 100.3 FM. Beat 102-103 also can be picked up in parts of South and West Wicklow where the borders of Wexford and Carlow meet.

=== Filming locations ===
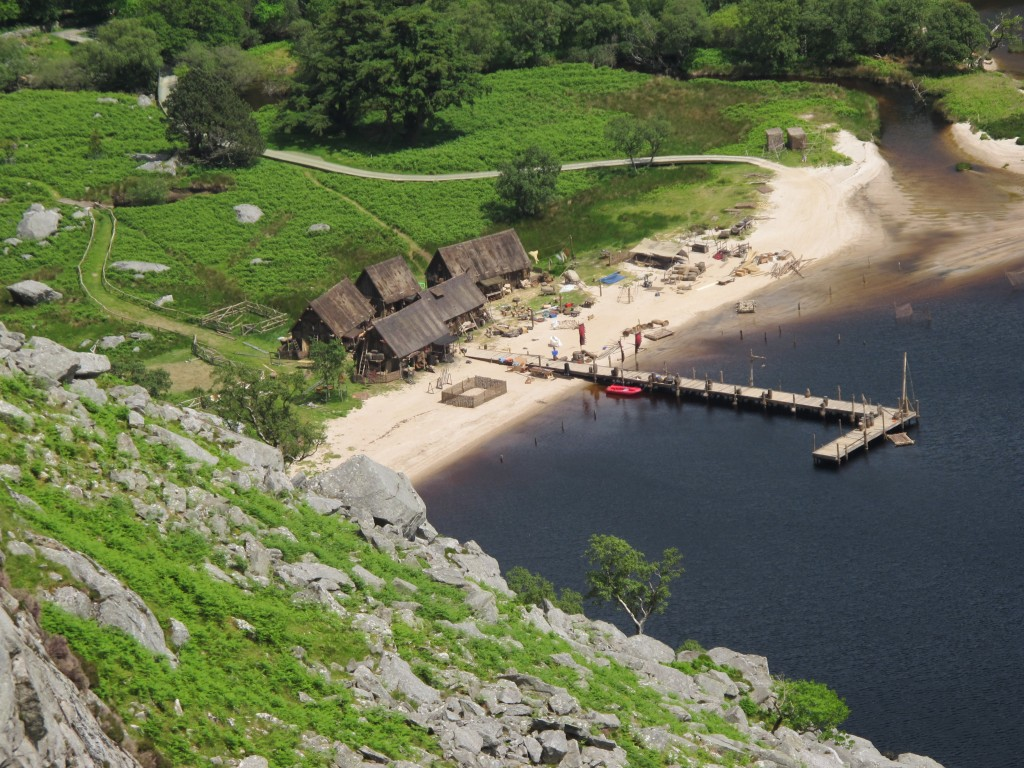
The set for Kattegat for the Vikings TV series, Ashford Studios

Much of the television series Vikings, (Amazon Prime), was filmed at Ashford Studios in the county, particularly scenes that required a green screen for subsequent CGI work. Some on-location filming was done elsewhere in the county. For example, certain scenes for Vikings (season 6) were filmed at and Powerscourt Waterfall and Powerscourt Estate and in Lough Tay. Ashford Studios was also the base for production of this final season. The spinoff from the series, Vikings: Valhalla (Netflix), is also based at Ashford Studios.

From 2016 to 2018, most of Into the Badlands (TV series) was filmed in County Wicklow.

Fate: The Winx Saga, announced by Netflix in 2019, was also shot in the county and based at Ardmore Studios, Bray.

Disenchanted, an Walt Disney Pictures film, was also filmed in the town of Greystones and Enniskerry village. The latter location being notable because the entire village was decorated for the production and closed to the public for certain days.

== Places of interest ==
- Avondale Forest
- Bray Head
- Brittas Bay
- Glen of the Downs
- Glendalough
- Poulaphouca Reservoir
- Powerscourt Estate
- Powerscourt Waterfall
- Wicklow Gaol
- Wicklow Mountains National Park

== Twinning ==
County Wicklow is twinned with Würzburg, Germany and Seminole County, Florida, USA.

== See also ==
- High Sheriff of Wicklow
- List of abbeys and priories in County Wicklow.
- Lord Lieutenant of Wicklow
- List of Baronies and Civil Parishes of County Wicklow
