= Glenealy, County Wicklow =

Village in County Wicklow, Ireland

Glenealy Irish: Gleann Fhaidhle
- Village
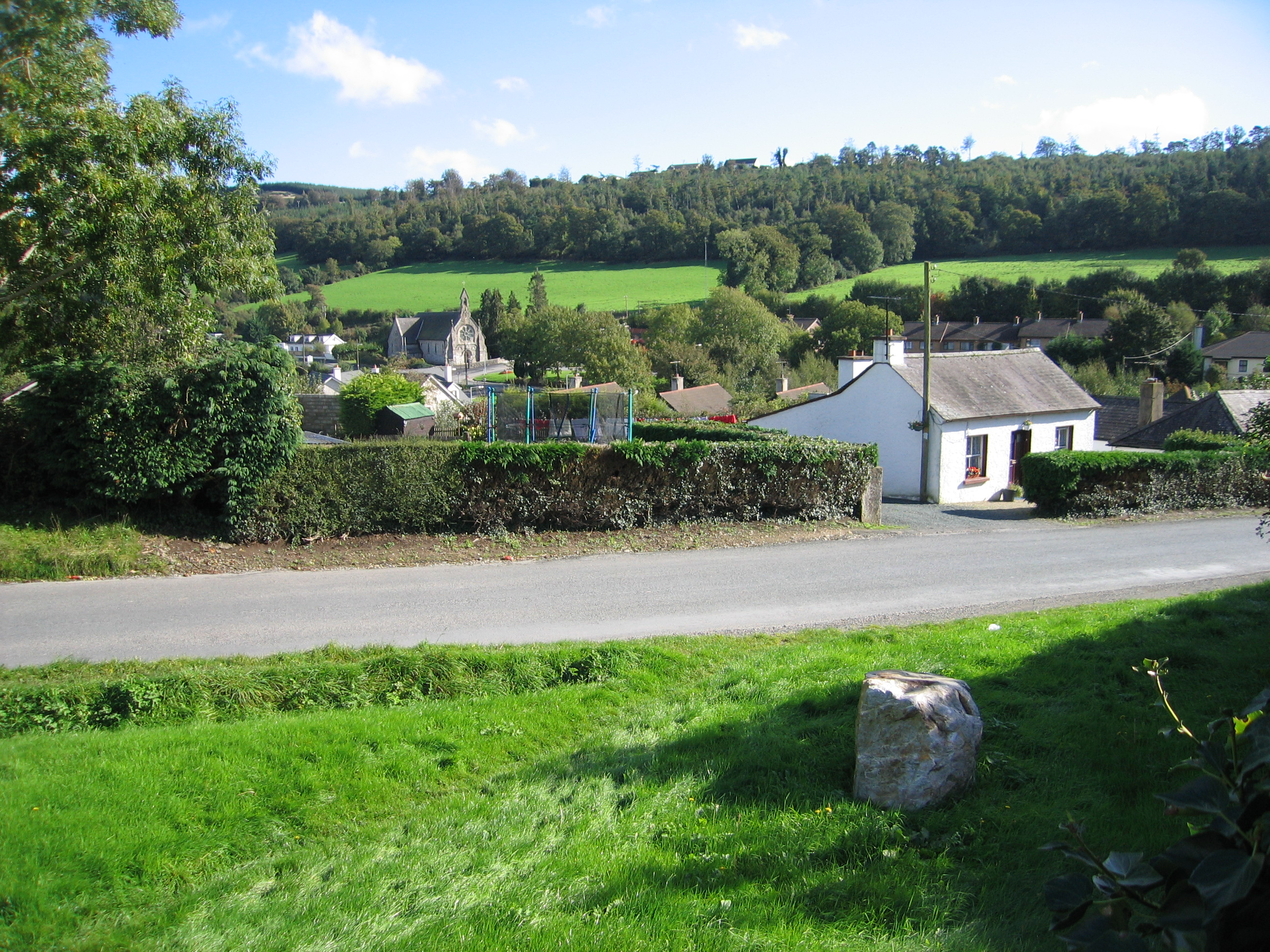
- Glenealy Village

- Location in Ireland
- Coordinates: 52°58′N 6°09′W
- Country: Ireland
- Province: Leinster
- County: County Wicklow

Population (2022)
  - Total: 623
- Time zone: UTC+0 (WET)
  - Summer (DST): UTC-1 (IST (WEST))
- Irish Grid Reference: T244923

Glenealy (Irish: Gleann Fhaidhle) is a village in County Wicklow, Ireland. It is 8 km (5 mi) west of Wicklow Town, on the R752 road. The Dublin–Rosslare railway line also passes through the village. The village is in a civil parish of the same name.

Since the extension of the N11 dual-carriageway to within 5 km (3 mi) of the village in 2004, it has been undergoing population growth, attracting people commuting to Dublin. In the 20 years between the 1996 and 2016 census, the village population grew from 383 to 694 people. The population of 623 at the 2022 census was based on updated boundaries.

The village has a school, pub and a small shop known to the locals as the 'yellow shop'.

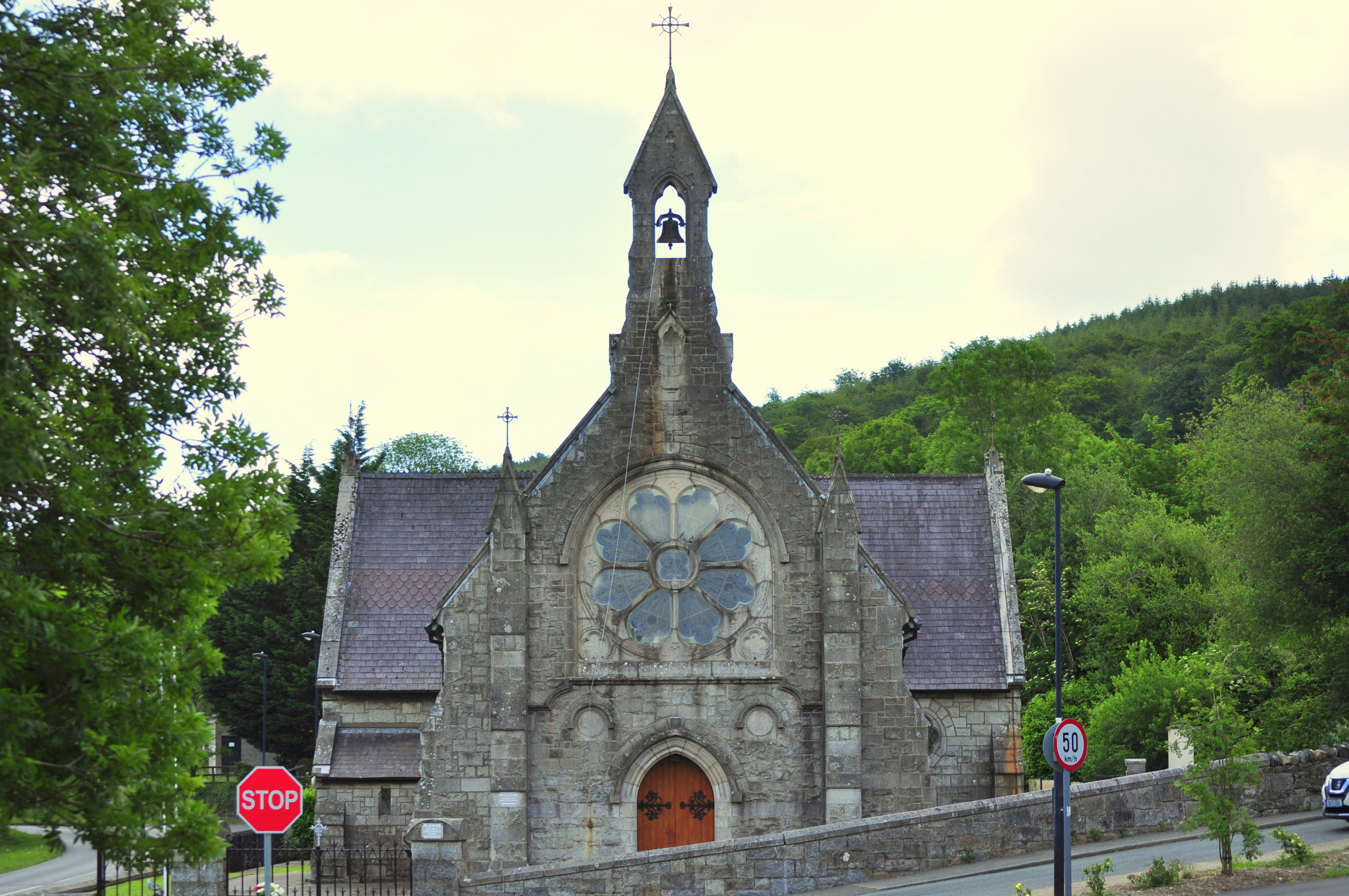
St. Joseph's Catholic Church

History

During the early medieval period Glenealy was the site of an ancient monastic establishment founded by St. Enan who was associated with St. Kevin. It was also connected with St. Molibba, Kevin's nephew who was active in Wicklow during that time.

== Transport ==
Bus Éireann route 133 serves the village providing links to Dublin, Bray, Wicklow, Rathnew, Rathdrum, Avoca and Arklow.

== Sport ==
Glenealy Hurling Club has won the Wicklow Senior Hurling Championship 16 times as of 2020, most recently beating Carnew in the 2018 county final. They were also the first Wicklow team to make it through to a Leinster Final. In 2017, the club reached the final of the Leinster intermediate club championship, but lost to Ballyragget of Kilkenny by one point.

== See also ==
- List of towns and villages in Ireland
