= Rathdrum, County Wicklow =

Town in County Wicklow, Ireland

Rathdrum Irish: Ráth Droma
- Town
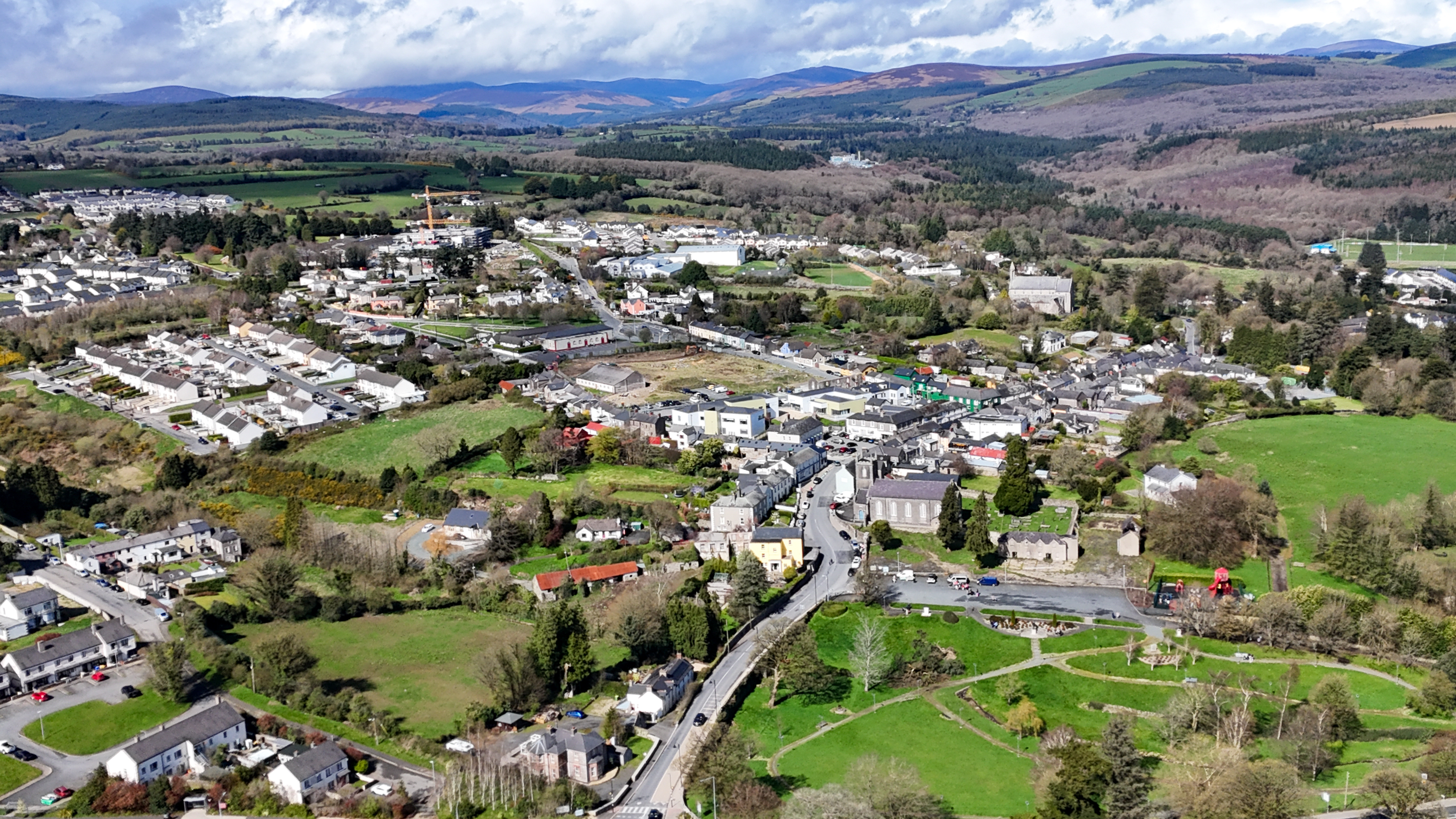
- Rathdrum skyline in 2026

- Location in Ireland
- Coordinates: 52°55′44″N 6°13′41″W
- Country: Ireland
- Province: Leinster
- County: County Wicklow

Population (2022)
  - Total: 2,264
- Time zone: UTC+0 (WET)
  - Summer (DST): UTC-1 (IST (WEST))
- Irish Grid Reference: T188883

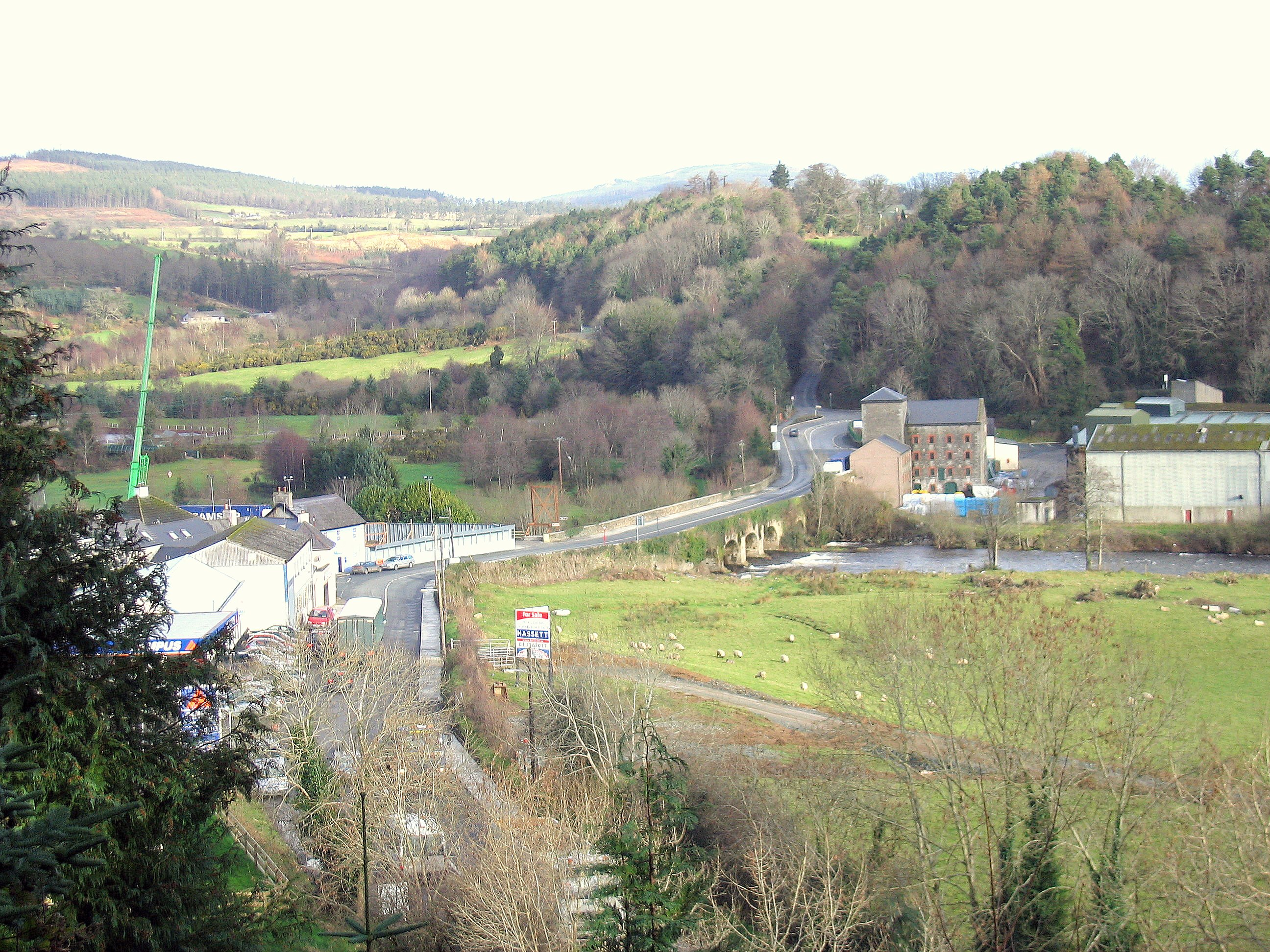
Rathdrum; R752 crossing the Avonmore River

Rathdrum (Irish: Ráth Droma, meaning 'ringfort of the ridge') is a small town in County Wicklow, Ireland. It is situated high on the western side of the Avonmore River valley, which flows through the Vale of Clara. The village is in a townland and civil parish of the same name.

== History ==
The town and area is referred to as Rathdrum in records stretching back as far back as 1604 in the Calendar of Patent Rolls of James I but is likely of much older origin.

Avondale House was built near the town around 1779.

The Comerford family established a mill in the town in the 19th century.

== Transport ==
=== Railway ===
Rathdrum is served by mainline train and bus from Dublin and Rosslare. Rathdrum railway station opened on 18 July 1863, replacing the earlier terminus at Rathdrum (Kilcommon) (opened on 20 August 1861) when the line was extended.

=== Bus ===
Wexford Bus route 740 from Wicklow to Arklow serves Rathdrum twice a day each way (once each way on Sundays) and provides a link to Avoca, Woodenbridge, Glenealy and Rathnew.

The Wicklow Way bus service operates two routes linking Rathdrum railway station and Rathdrum with Glendalough and Tinahely, respectively.

== Politics and government ==
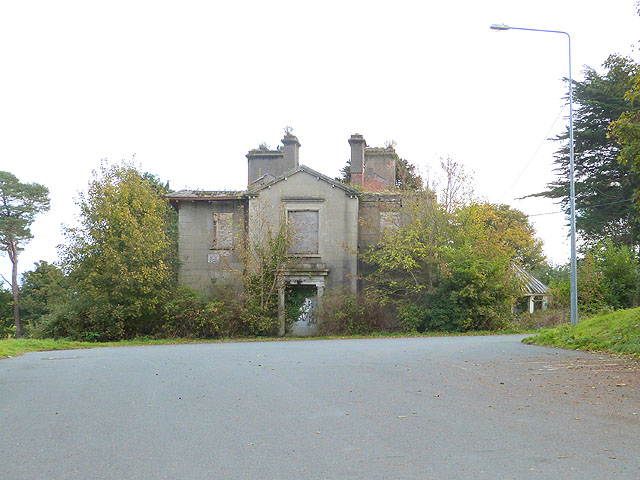
Ardavon House, Rathdrum, formerly the home of the Comerfords and later operated as a school from 1958 to 1991. It was damaged in a fire while owned by Wicklow County Council and remains derelict as of 2025.

Rathdrum is part of the Wicklow constituency for national elections and referendums, and the South European Parliament constituency for European elections.

Rathdrum is the location of the Honorary Consulate of Belarus in Ireland.

== People ==
Born in Rathdrum:

- Anne Devlin (1780–1851), Irish republican and housekeeper to Robert Emmet
- Dudley Higgins, Ireland national rugby union team player and former president of the Irish Rugby Football Union
- Patrick Moran, first Roman Catholic Bishop of Dunedin, New Zealand
- Charles Stewart Parnell, nationalist politician once dubbed the "uncrowned king of Ireland" was born at nearby Avondale House. This house is now open to the public and situated in Avondale Forest park.

Notable residents:

- Hazel O'Connor, English singer-songwriter and actress

== Filming location ==
The following works have been filmed in part in the town:

- Michael Collins (1996)

== See also ==
- List of towns and villages in the Republic of Ireland
