= Clara, County Wicklow =

Hamlet in County Wicklow, Ireland

Coordinates: 52.9675°N 6.2607°W

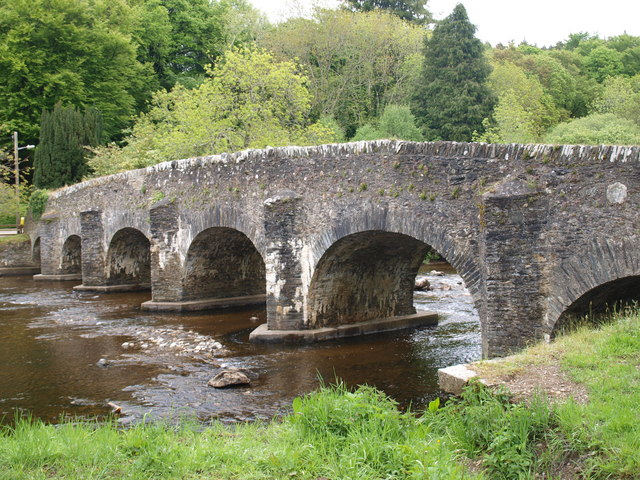
Clara Vale Bridge was built in the late 17th century

Clara or Clara More (Irish: An Clárach Mór) is a townland and small clachan consisting of a bridge over the Avonmore River and a number of buildings in County Wicklow in Ireland. The village is situated halfway between Laragh and Rathdrum on the R755 road, and is sometimes referred to as the 'smallest village in Ireland'.

The most prominent structures locally include the settlement's narrow six-arch road bridge (built c.1680), and the nearby Clara Vale Catholic church (built c.1799). The church is dedicated to Saint Patrick and Saint Killian and underwent significant renovations in the late 1830s. The local Vale of Clara Nature Reserve is thought to be one of the oldest hardwood forests in Ireland.
