= R763 road (Ireland) =

Road in Ireland

R763 road
- Bóthar R763
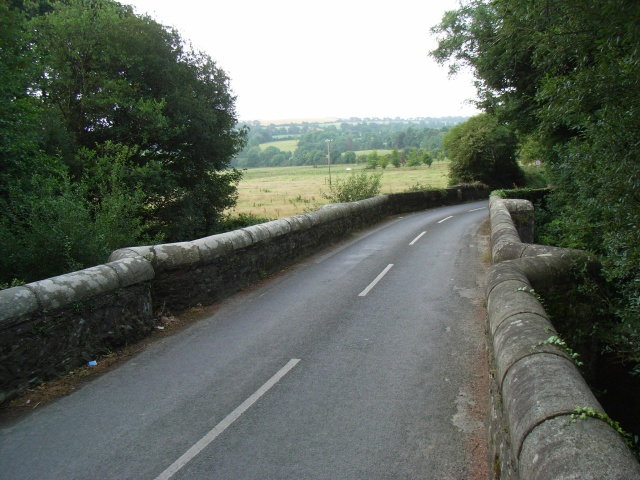
- Nunscross Bridge over the River Vartry on the R763 road

Route information
- Length: 10.8 km (6.7 mi)

Location
- Country: Ireland
- Primary destinations: County Wicklow; Ashford (R764); Nuns Cross; Crosses the River Vartry; Tiglin; Tomriland Cross Roads; Annamoe (R755 road)

Highway system
- Roads in Ireland; Motorways; Primary; Secondary; Regional

The R763 road is a regional road in County Wicklow in Ireland. It connects the R764 road near Ashford to the R755 road at Annamoe, 10.8 kilometres (6.7 mi) away (map).

The government legislation that defines the R763, the Roads Act 1993 (Classification of Regional Roads) Order 2012 (Statutory Instrument 54 of 2012), provides the following official description:

Ashford — Annamoe, County Wicklow

Between its junction with R764 at Ballinahinch and its junction with R755 at Annamoe via Nuns Cross, Tiglin and Tomriland all in the county of Wicklow.

== See also ==
- National primary road
- National secondary road
- Regional road
- Roads in Ireland
