= Evelyn Booth =

Irish botanist

Evelyn Mary Booth
- Born: 30 October 1897; Annamoe, Laragh, County Wicklow, Ireland
- Died: 13 December 1988 (aged 91); Lucy's Wood, Bunclody, County Wexford
- Known for: writing The Flora of County Carlow
- Scientific career
- Fields: Botany

Evelyn Mary Booth (1897–1988) was an Irish botanist, designer of the gardens at Lucy's Wood, and writer of The Flora of County Carlow. She was described as "one of Ireland's most loved and respected botanists".

== Life ==
Evelyn Mary Booth was born 30 October 1897 at Annamoe, Laragh, County Wicklow, one of three children of Hilda Mary Hall-Dare and James Erskine Wise Booth. Through her father, Booth was related to Robert Barton, a signatory of the 1921 Anglo-Irish Treaty, and Erskine Hamilton Childers, President of Ireland, from 1973 to 1974. Her mother was the daughter of Caroline Hall-Dare, the founder of the Newtownbarry School of Lace.

Booth attended boarding school in Southbourne, Dorset. As a young woman, Booth took part in many horse shows, including those at the Royal Dublin Society grounds in Ballsbridge. During World War I Booth served as a Red Cross ambulance driver in France, and as a hospital quartermaster during World War II. Between the wars, Booth spent time in India with her brother, Brigadier John Booth and her cousin Kathleen Cunningham, the wife of the Governor of the Northwest Frontier Province at Peshawar. Booth died at her home near Bunclody on 13 December 1988.

== Botanical work ==
Upon her return to Ireland, Booth settled in Lucy's Wood, close to the town of Bunclody. Whilst she had many interests including horse riding, fly fishing, and needlework, botany was one of her key hobbies. An example of Booth's needlework can be found in the National Museum of Ireland, Country Life in Mayo. At the garden at Lucy's Wood, Booth planned and developed a diverse garden, which is still a tourist destination today. Booth stocked the garden with rare plants, unusual cultivars and wild species. An anemone that Booth discovered in a wood nearby, Anemone nemorosa, was named "Lucy's Wood".

Following a meeting with botanist Edith Rawlins, Booth became interested in the observation and recording of plants. From 1939 she was a member of the Wild Flower Society, and began to collect seeds from wild flowers in Counties Carlow and Wexford, depositing parts of her collection in the National Botanic Gardens, Glasnevin. She went on to serve as the chairperson of the Bunclody Horticultural Society for a number of years. In 1963 Booth attended the inaugural meeting of the Irish Regional Branch of the Botanical Society of the British Isles, and was elected to the committee, which she served for many years.

Much of Booth's work was published in the Irish Naturalists' Journal. She also contributed to a number of volumes, including the Atlas of the British Flora. In 1954 the Wild Flower Magazine reported that Booth had recorded 584 species in County Wexford, 579 in County Carlow, and 584 in County Kilkenny. Booth's interests extended to fauna also, and she is considered an early environmentalist, recording surveys of butterflies, dragonflies, birds, and some Crustacea for the Natural History Museum, the National Herbarium, and An Foras Forbartha. Her most significant work was the book The Flora of County Carlow, which was published in 1979, assisted by Maura Scannell. Following in the tradition of Robert Lloyd Praeger as an inventory of plants from a county, this book was the first Irish county flora to be written by a woman.
