= Annamoe =

Village in County Wicklow, Ireland

Annamoe Áth na mBó
- Village
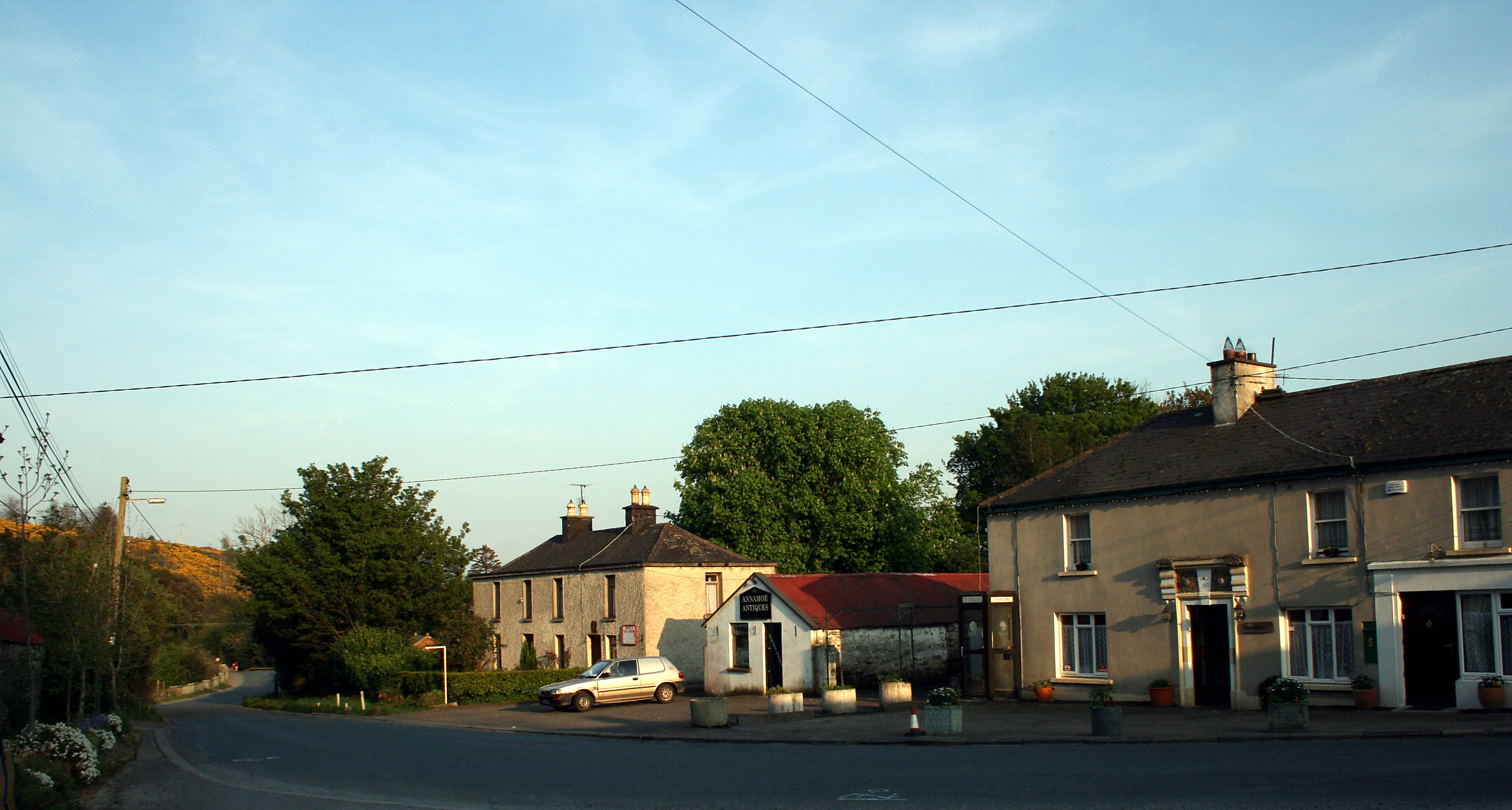
- The R755 road passes through Annamoe

- Location in Ireland
- Coordinates: 53°01′54″N 6°15′18″W
- Country: Ireland
- Province: Leinster
- County: County Wicklow
- Townland: Drummin
- Elevation: 180 m (590 ft)
- Time zone: UTC+0 (WET)
  - Summer (DST): UTC-1 (IST (WEST))
- Irish Grid Reference: T169992

Annamoe (Irish: Áth na mBó, meaning 'ford of the cows') is a village located on the Avonmore river in County Wicklow, Ireland about 32 km (20 mi) south of Dublin. It is on the R755 road (at the junction with the R763) between Roundwood and Laragh on the road to Glendalough.

The small stone humpback bridge is a common place for tourists to stop and view the County Wicklow scenery. There is a trout fishery in the village with a 4-acre (16,000 m^{2}) lake where one can fly or bait fish. A separate fishing pond for children allows them to catch brown and rainbow trout.

Annamoe and the surrounding countryside is a breeding stronghold of the great spotted woodpecker, Ireland's newest species.

Castle Kevin, close to Annamoe, of which a few ruins survive, was a medieval fort which formed an important part of Dublin city's defences against raids by the O'Toole clan. The constable was an important Crown official.

== Notable residents ==
- John Boorman, film director.
- Erskine Childers, former Irish president (buried at Derrylossery Church).
- Daniel Day-Lewis, actor.
- Paul McGuinness, manager of rock band U2.
- Rebecca Miller, filmmaker and novelist.
- John Millington Synge, playwright.
- Paddy Moloney, founder and leader of traditional Irish band The Chieftains.
- Paolo Tullio, chef.

== Gallery ==
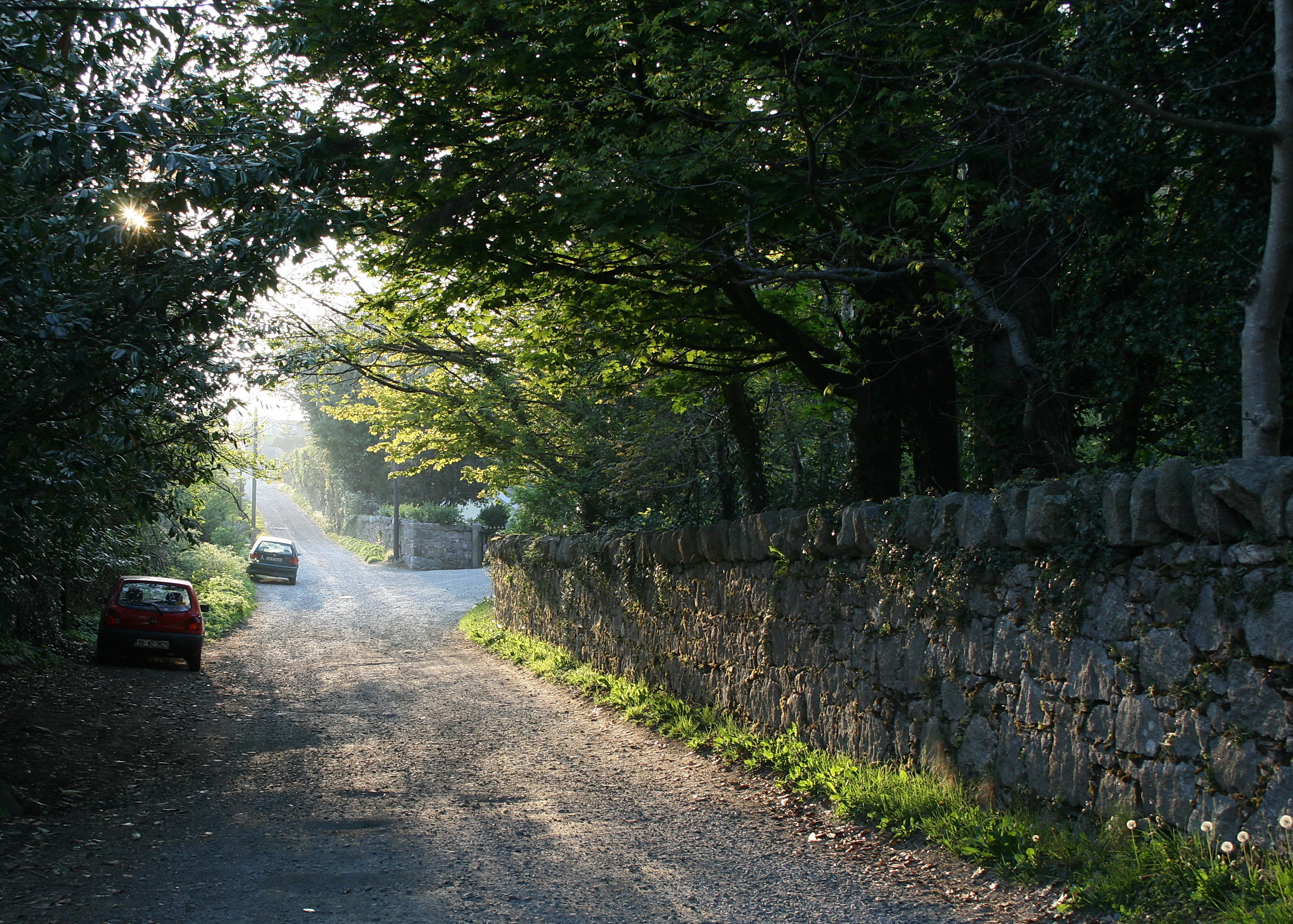
Annamoe

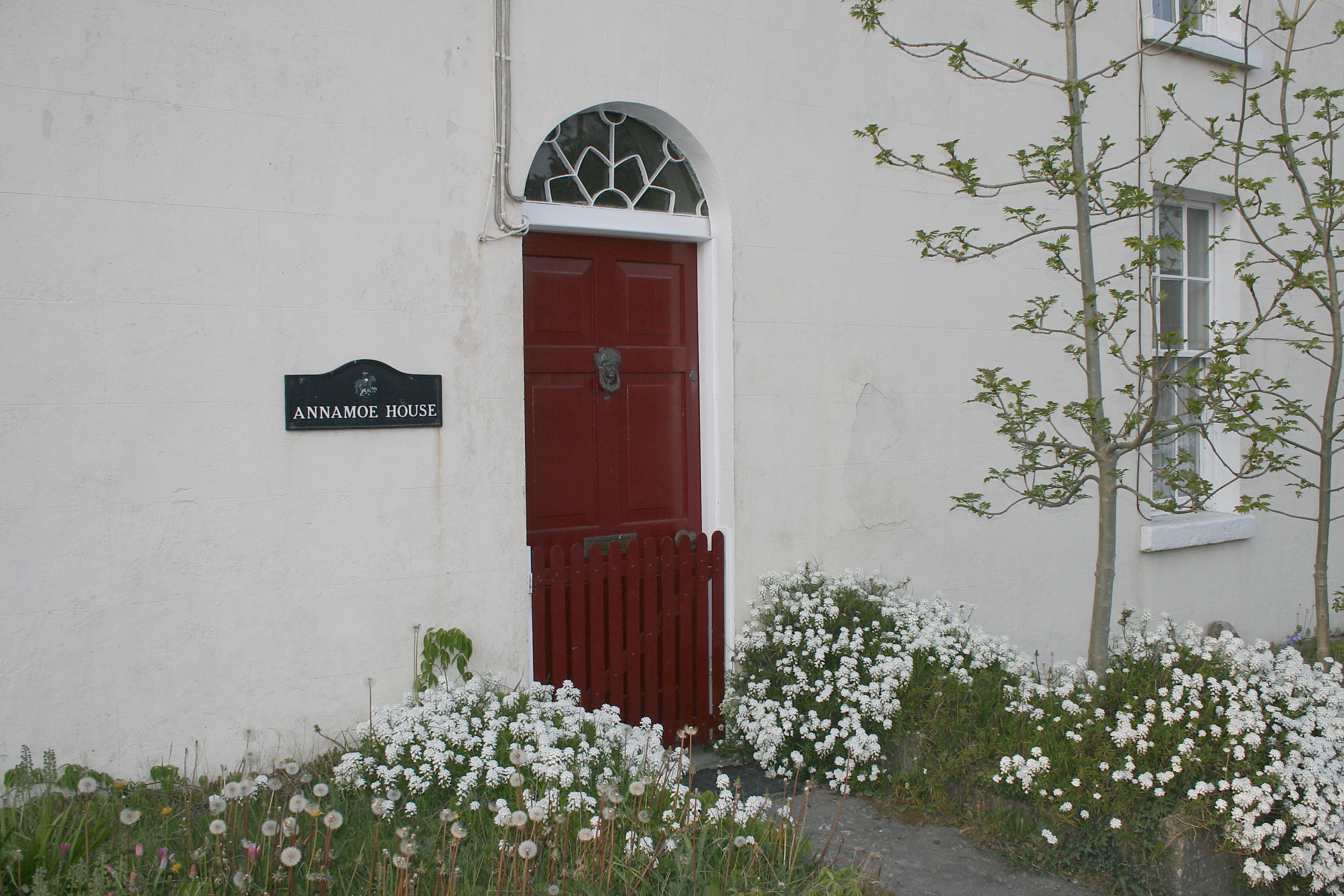
Annamoe House

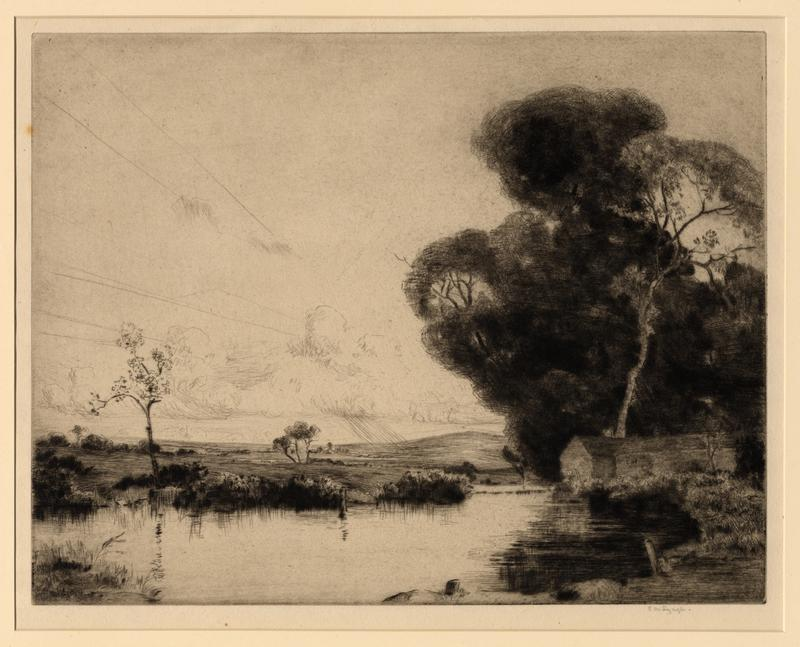
Edward Millington Synge (1860–1913), On the Banks of the Annamoe River (Aberdeen City Collection)

== See also ==
- List of towns and villages in Ireland
