= Tuach =

Tuach is a surname. Notable people with the surname include:

- Buay Tuach (born 1995), Ethiopian-American basketball player
- Rod Tuach (born 1945), Irish photographer
