= R765 road (Ireland) =

Road in Ireland

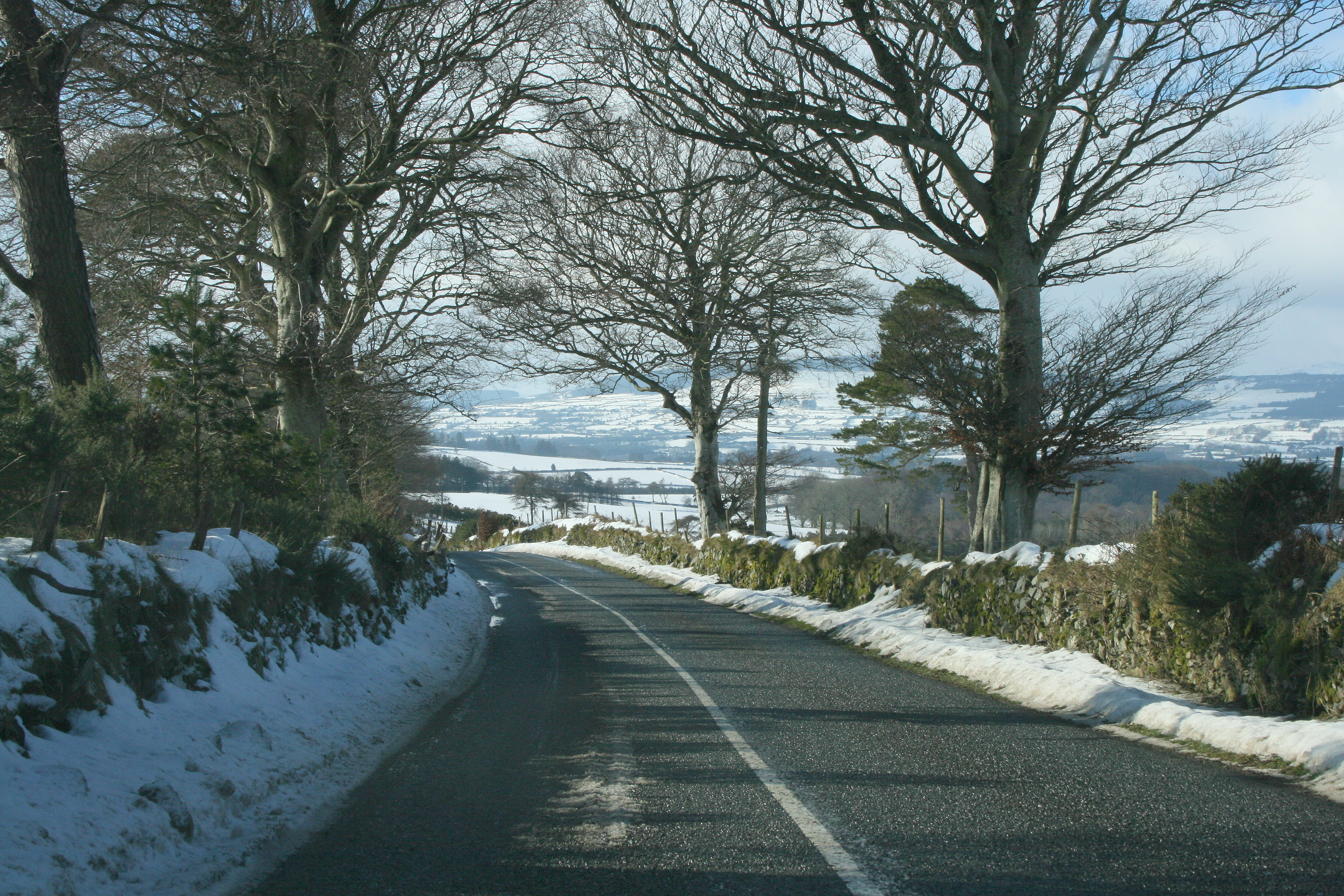
Approaching the Roundwood plateau from the east

The R765 road (also known as the Newtown Road or the Roundwood Road) is a regional road in Ireland joining the villages of Roundwood and Newtownmountkennedy in County Wicklow.

The road is 10km long.

== Route ==
The road starts eastwards at a junction with the R755 in the village of Roundwood and terminates in Newtownmountkennedy at the R772 (the former N11 national primary road).

== See also ==
- Roads in Ireland
- National primary road
- National secondary road
