= Clara Lara FunPark =

Adventure facility in County Wicklow, Ireland

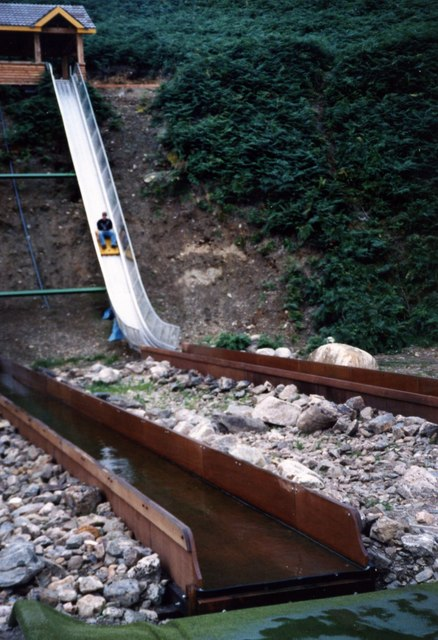
- The Water Drop Slide (photographed in 1995)
- Location: Rathdrum, County Wicklow, Ireland
- Coordinates: 52.973909°N 6.272340°W
- Owner: Clara Lara Ltd
- Opened: 1983
- Status: Operating
- Area: 19 acres (7.7 ha)
- Website: claralara.ie

Location of Clara Lara in Ireland

Clara Lara FunPark is an outdoor adventure and water park in County Wicklow, Ireland.

== History ==
The park was opened by Peter Morphew in 1983, under the name "Clara-Lara Trout Farm and Funpark". It is located in the Vale of Clara; it takes its name from that and from the nearby village of Laragh. It only covered 14 acres (5.7 ha) at that time. The founder said that he wanted "it to be as far removed from Disneyland as possible […] absolutely rural and as rustic, without any concrete at all."

In 1995, a 14-year-old girl received a facial scar in an accident at Clara Lara; she was awarded IR£10,000 but never received it because the park had no insurance at the time.

In 2003, the founder, Peter Morphew, was convicted of possession of child pornography as a result of the Operation Amethyst investigation, and received a six-month sentence. He resigned as a director of Clara Lara Ltd as a result.

In a 2006 review, The Irish Times awarded Clara Lara four stars out of five, praising the water slide and rowboats, but pointing out the park's dependence on good weather.

== Description ==
The park opens on weekends in May and every day in June–August.

It occupies about 19 acres (7.7 ha) on the west bank of the Avonmore River. Attractions include obstacle courses, zipline, kayaking, water slides, a "pirate ship," tree houses, "Tarzan" swings, rope bridges, rowing boats, Amphicats, rafting, go-karts and crazy golf.
