= Vartry Reservoir =

Major water supply scheme for Dublin city, Ireland

Vartry Reservoir Taiscumar Fheartraí
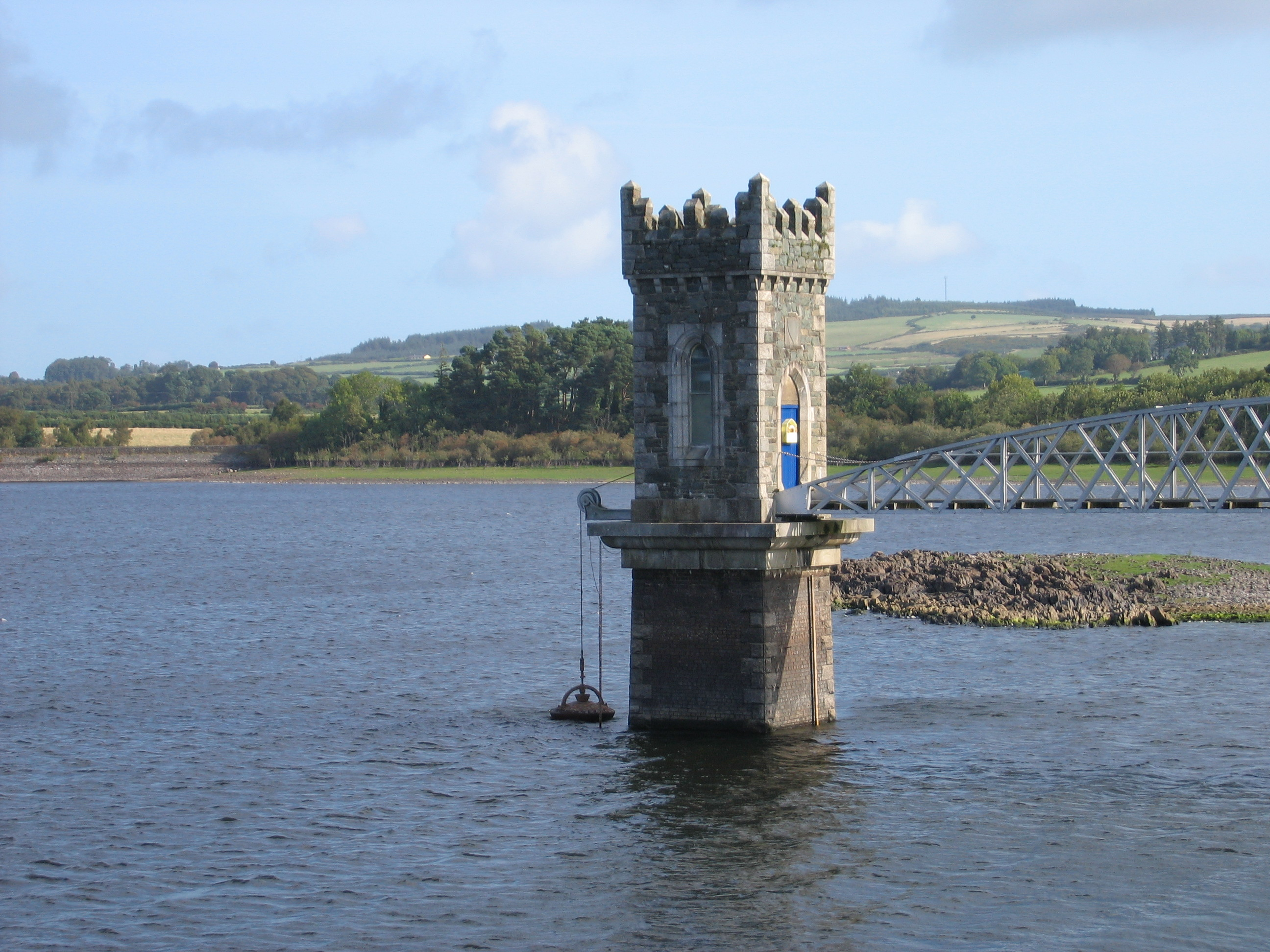
- Roundwood Lakes

- Location within Ireland
- Location: County Wicklow
- Coordinates: 53°03′31″N 6°12′12″W
- Type: reservoir
- Primary inflows: River Vartry
- Primary outflows: River Vartry
- Basin countries: Ireland

Vartry Reservoir (Irish: Taiscumar Fheartraí) is a reservoir at Roundwood in County Wicklow, Ireland. The water is piped from Vartry to a large covered reservoir in Stillorgan in the southern suburbs of Dublin. The reservoir is operated by Irish Water.

The original (lower) reservoir was completed in 1863 and has a capacity of 11.3 billion litres and a maximum depth of 18.3 metres. A second embankment, 3.5 km upstream, was completed in 1923 to form the upper reservoir. This has a capacity of 5.6 billion litres and a maximum depth of 13.4 metres.

== History ==
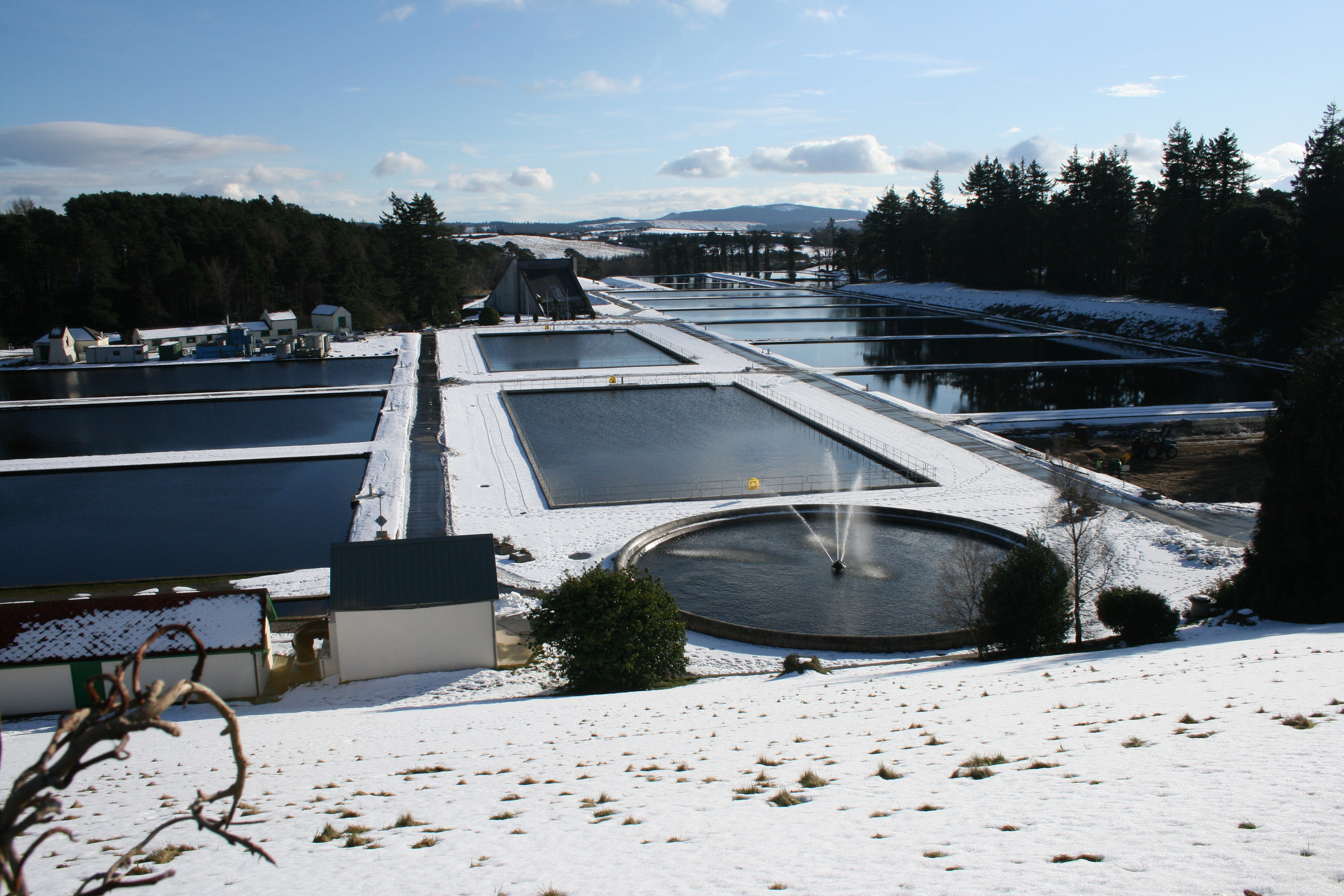
Vartry waterworks, downstream of dam

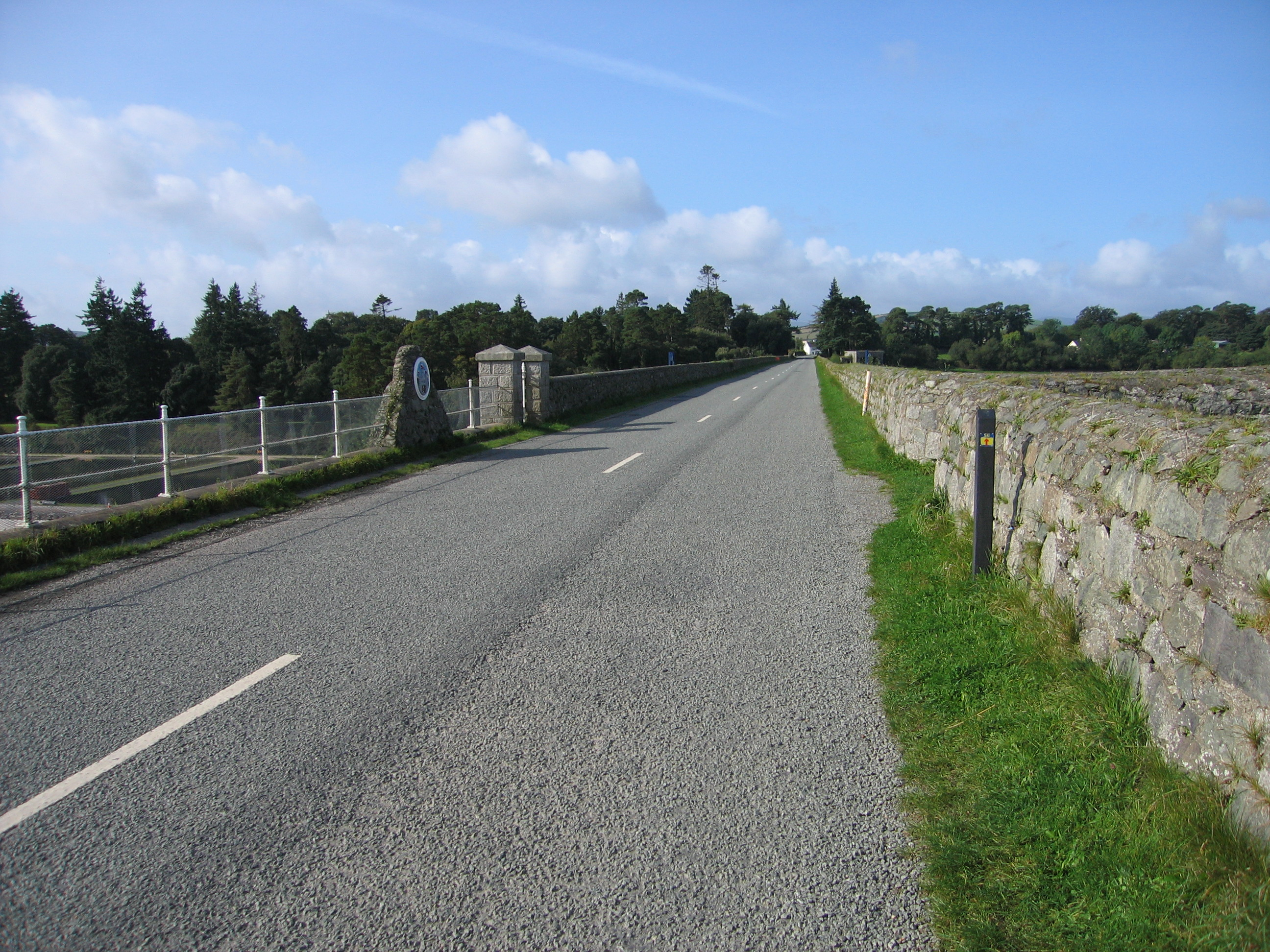
The R764 road along top of dam/embankment

The Vartry Reservoir scheme involved the partial redirection and damming of the Vartry River, the building of a series of water piping and filtering systems (and related public works) to carry freshwater to the city.

Between 1862 and 1868 the lower reservoir was formed by constructing an earthen dam across the valley of the River Vartry after a Dublin Water Works Committee was established to develop a new water supply to Dublin and suburbs. The committee was chaired by Dr. John Gray who actively promoted what would become the "Vartry scheme". The scheme was formally opened on 30 June 1863.

This work was particularly important in the improvement of living conditions and public health in Dublin city. It improved sanitation and helped reduce outbreaks of cholera, typhus and other diseases associated with contaminated water.

The lower reservoir and its capacity is mentioned in chapter 17 of James Joyce's Ulysses.
