= Hedlundia scannelliana =

Conservation status
- Critically Endangered (IUCN 3.1)

Scientific classification
- Kingdom: Plantae
- Clade: Tracheophytes
- Clade: Angiosperms
- Clade: Eudicots
- Clade: Rosids
- Order: Rosales
- Family: Rosaceae
- Genus: Hedlundia
- Species: H. scannelliana

Binomial name
- Hedlundia scannelliana (T.C.G.Rich) Sennikov & Kurtto

Synonyms
- Pyrus scannelliana (T.C.G.Rich) M.F.Fay & Christenh.; Sorbus scannelliana T.C.G.Rich

Species of trees

Hedlundia scannelliana, commonly known as Scannell's whitebeam, is a species of shrub or tree endemic to Ross Island near Killarney in southwest Ireland. It is one of the rarest tree species in the world; only five individual plants are known.

== Description ==
Hedlundia scannelliana is a small tree growing to about 5 m (16 ft) in height. Leaves are elliptic, ranging from 1.6 to 1.85 times as long as they are broad. The upper face of the leaf is a dark, somewhat shiny green, while the underside is light greyish green, this due to the abundance of short, soft hairs. Both the base and apex of the leaf form acute angles, while the margins are lobed, incised 1/7 to 1/4 the way to the midrib. The flowers are white and form a quite dense inflorescence. Very few fruits have been observed, but seem to be more elongated than other whitebeams.

== Discovery ==
The species now known as H. scannelliana was first critically examined in 1988, when it was believed to be an ecotype of Hedlundia anglica. Further investigation led to its being classified as a distinct, new species in 2009.

== Naming ==
The specific epithet, scannelliana, was chosen to honour Irish botanist Maura Scannell, author of, among other works, the Census Catalogue of the Flora of Ireland.
