= Ashford, County Wicklow =

Village in County Wicklow, Ireland

Ashford Áth na Fuinseoige
- Town
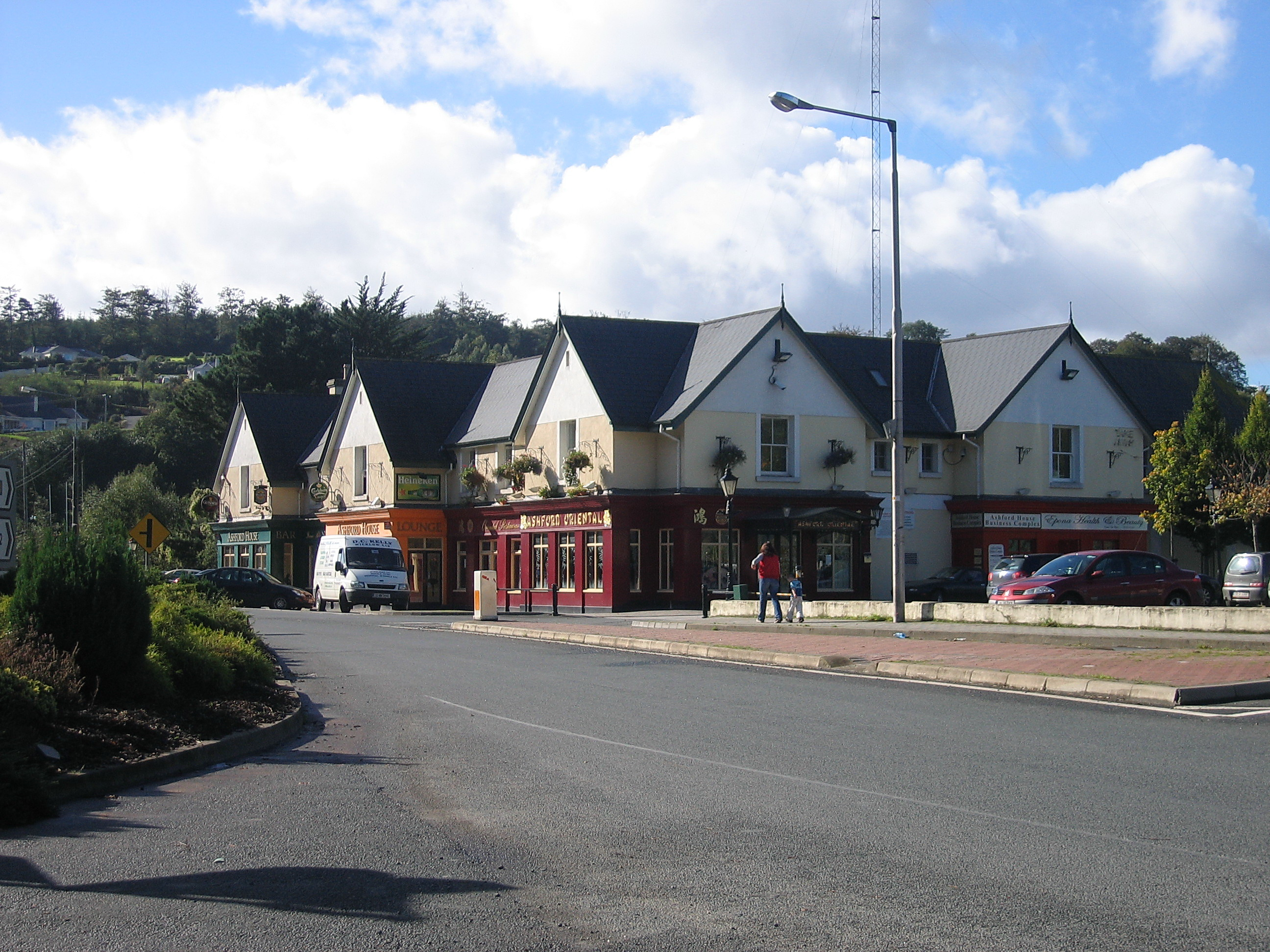
- Ashford town

- Location in Ireland
- Coordinates: 53.011°N 6.108°W
- Country: Ireland
- Province: Leinster
- County: County Wicklow
- Elevation: 24 m (79 ft)

Population (2022)
  - Total: 1,892
- Irish Grid Reference: T267971

Ashford (Irish: Áth na Fuinseoige), historically known as Ballymacahara (Irish: Baile Mhic Aodha Charraigh), is a small town in County Wicklow, Ireland. It lies on the River Vartry and at the meeting of the R772, R763 and R764 regional roads. The village was formerly on the main Dublin–Wexford route, the N11, but was bypassed by the new N11 in 2004 (later part of the M11 motorway). As of the 2022 census, the village had a population of 1,892 people.

== Geography ==
Ashford is about 3 km (1.9 mi) north of Rathnew, which is on the outskirts of the county town of Wicklow.

== Amenities ==
The Mount Usher Gardens and Arboretum are located at the end of the village nearer Wicklow Town. The gardens were previously owned and operated by Madelaine Jay and the Jay family. Recently, though, the gardens and shopping courtyard were leased to the Avoca Handweavers company, which originated in Avoca, County Wicklow. The company was owned and operated by the Pratt family for many generations, but sold to U.S. multinational corporation Aramark in 2015.

There are a number of shops in the village centre, as well as a small shopping yard at Mount Usher Gardens, with both locations also featuring eating places. A community playground, Ashford Community Park, was opened in 2014, with 200,000 euro in County Council and Leader Programme funding. Opened by the donor of the 30-year lease, Brian Stokes, and playground committee chairperson Maurice Ramsay, the facility was built over two years and includes a full children's playground, teen zone, zip line, quiet zone and adult outdoor gym equipment.

== Transportation ==
Ashford is served by Bus Éireann route 133, linking it with Wicklow and Dublin.. Since 2023, it has also been served by route 131, connecting Wicklow Town and Bray. Since 2012, routes 002 and 006 linking the village with Rosslare Harbour and Waterford no longer serve the village, with route 006 terminated from the network altogether.

== Notable people ==
- Maclean Burke, actor, known for his role as Damien Halpin in the Irish soap opera Fair City lives in the village.
- Katie McGrath, actress, known for her role as Morgana in the BBC drama Merlin.
- Joey Tempest, lead singer with the Swedish rock group Europe lived in Ashford for six years.
- Rod Tuach, photographer
- Ferdia Walsh-Peelo, actor, musician, known for his lead role in the motion picture Sing Street and as Alfred the Great in Vikings.
- Niall MacGinnis, actor, physician, known for his lead role in the motion picture **Martin Luther**. His family still live in Ashford.

== See also ==
- List of towns and villages in Ireland
