= R756 road (Ireland) =

Road in Ireland

R756 road
- Bóthar R756

Route information
- Length: 32 km (20 mi)

Location
- Country: Ireland
- Primary destinations: Dunlavin; Laragh

Highway system
- Roads in Ireland; Motorways; Primary; Secondary; Regional

The R756 road is a regional road in Ireland running west–east from Dunlavin to Laragh. Its entire 32 km (20 mi) length is within County Wicklow crossing east–west through the Wicklow Gap (Irish: Bearna Chill Mhantáin).

== Route ==
From Dunlavin it heads northeast, intersecting the N81 national secondary road near the village of Hollywood. It then heads southeast, rising through the West Wicklow Mountains to the Wicklow Gap, the highest point on the road at 470m, before descending through the Glandasan Valley. In this valley it passes through old mine-works to its junction with the R757 in the outskirts of Glendalough and continues for a further 2 km to Laragh, where it terminates at a junction with the R755 and the Military Road.

The 26 km (16 mi) section from Hollywood to Laragh is known as the Wicklow Gap Road (Irish: Bóthar Bhearna Chill Mhantáin) and it is one of only two routes crossing the Wicklow Mountains from east to west, the other being the road through the Sally Gap (Irish: Bearnas na Diallaite, meaning 'Gap of the Saddle') in North Wicklow. The road through the Wicklow Gap is both an important regional route and a very popular tourist route as it travels through some spectacular scenery.

The Wicklow Gap, between Tonelagee Mountain and Camaderry Mountain is where the entrance to Turlough Hill electricity 'storage' hydro-plant it situated. During periods of off-peak electricity demand, water is pumped up from Lough Nathanagan, a corrie lake at the foot of Turlough Hill to an artificial reservoir at the top; when electricity demand is high, the water falls back through turbines inside the mountain to produce hydro-electric power for the national grid.

On a clear day from the summit of the Wicklow Gap (at Turlough Hill carpark) it is possible to look eastwards across the Irish Sea and view the mountains of Snowdonia in Wales.

== Gallery ==
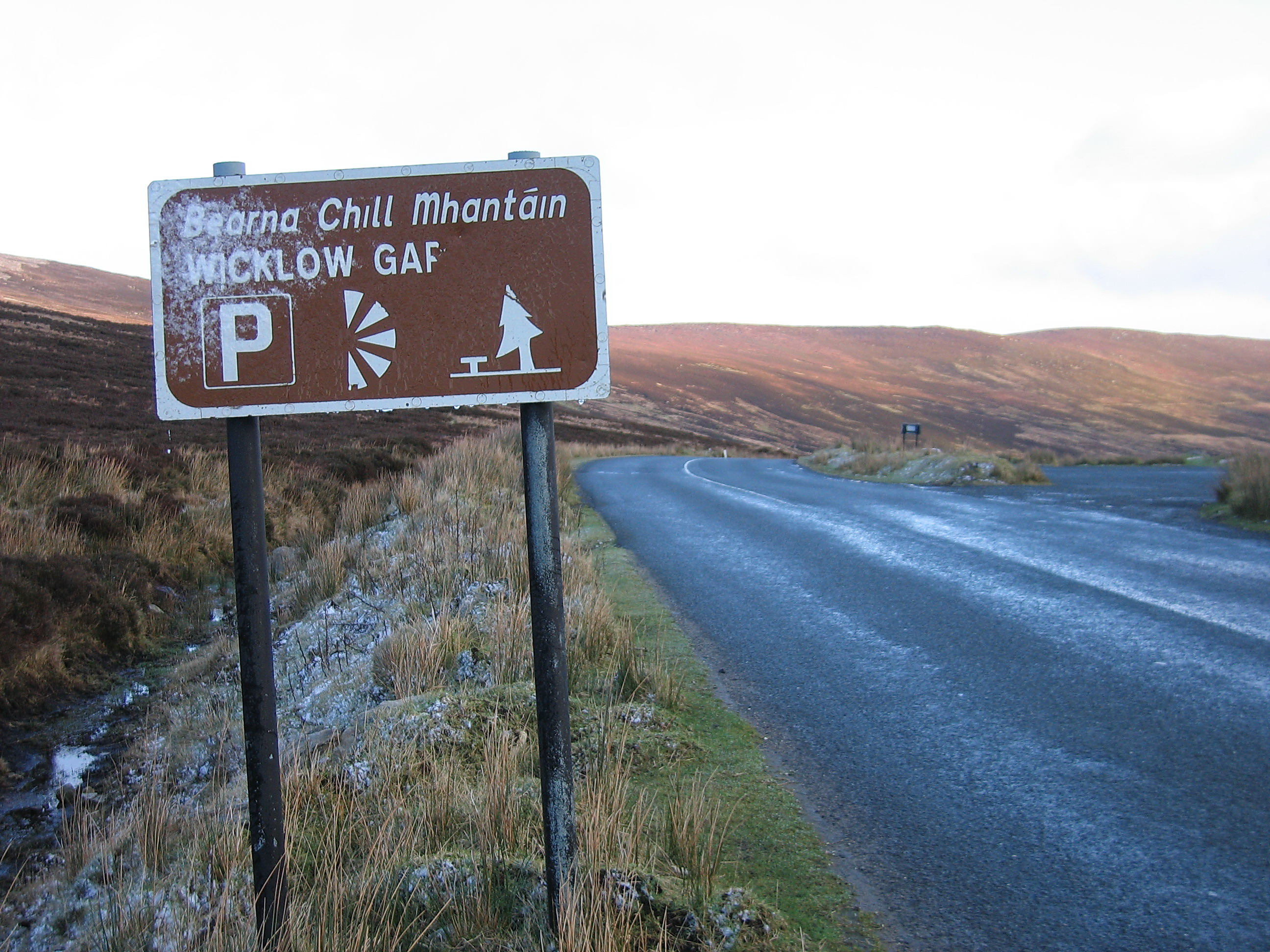
The Wicklow Gap

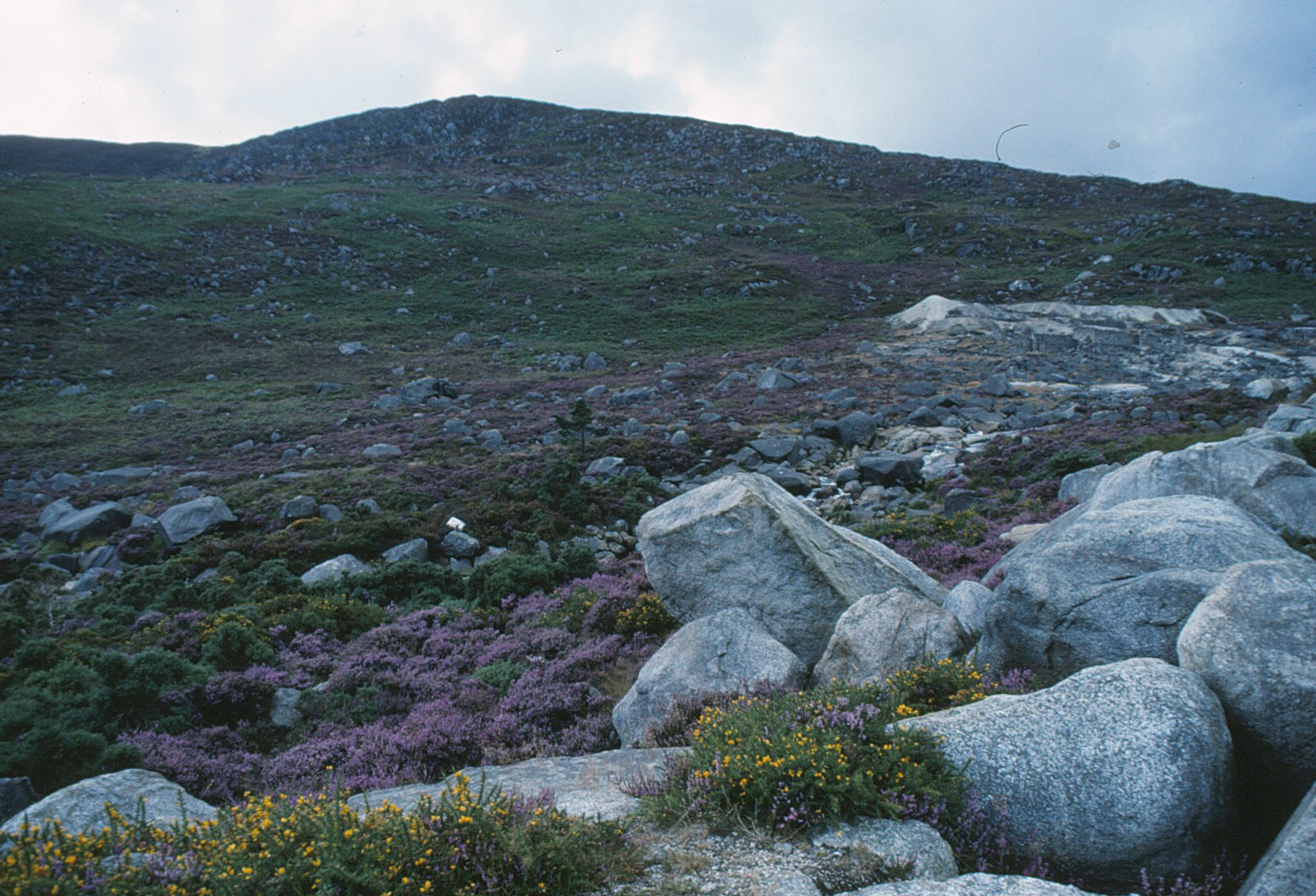
Roadside rocks and heather on hills scenery at the Wicklow Gap

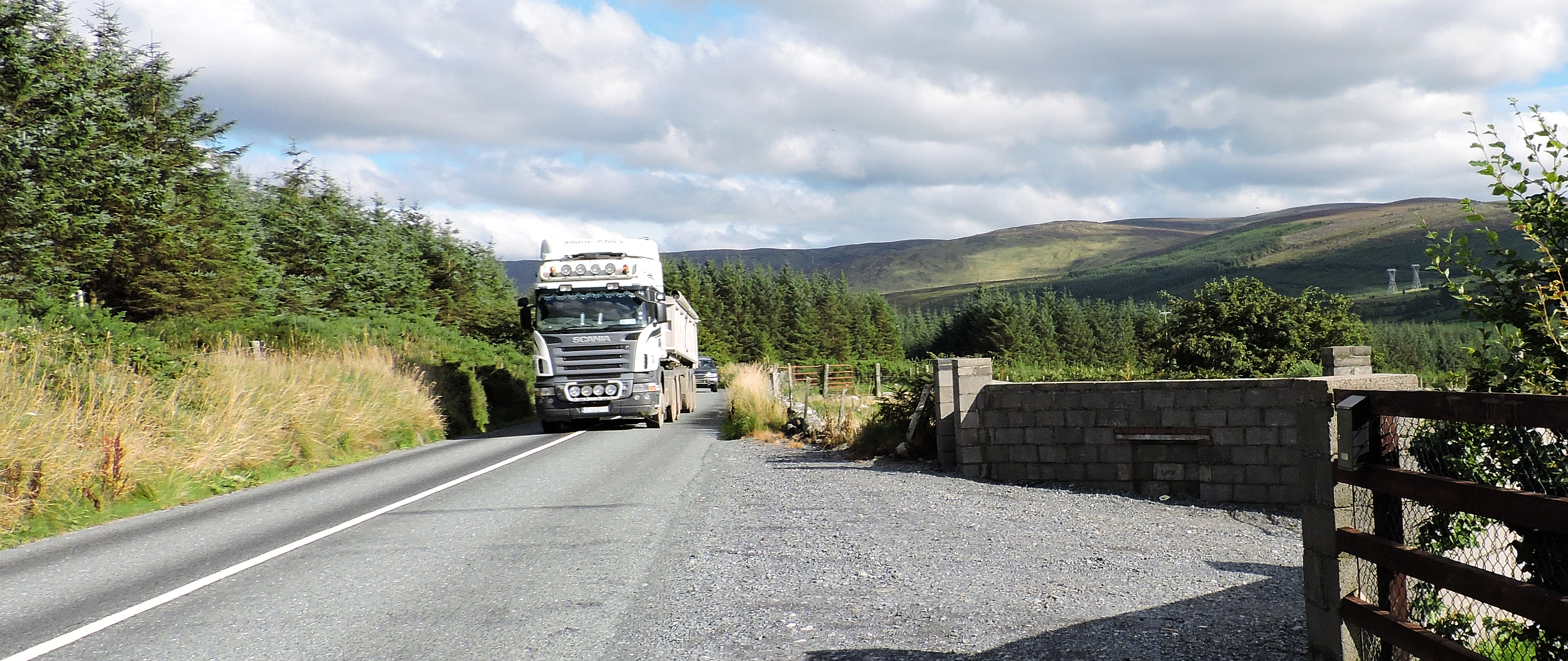
R756 between Wicklow Gap and Hollywood

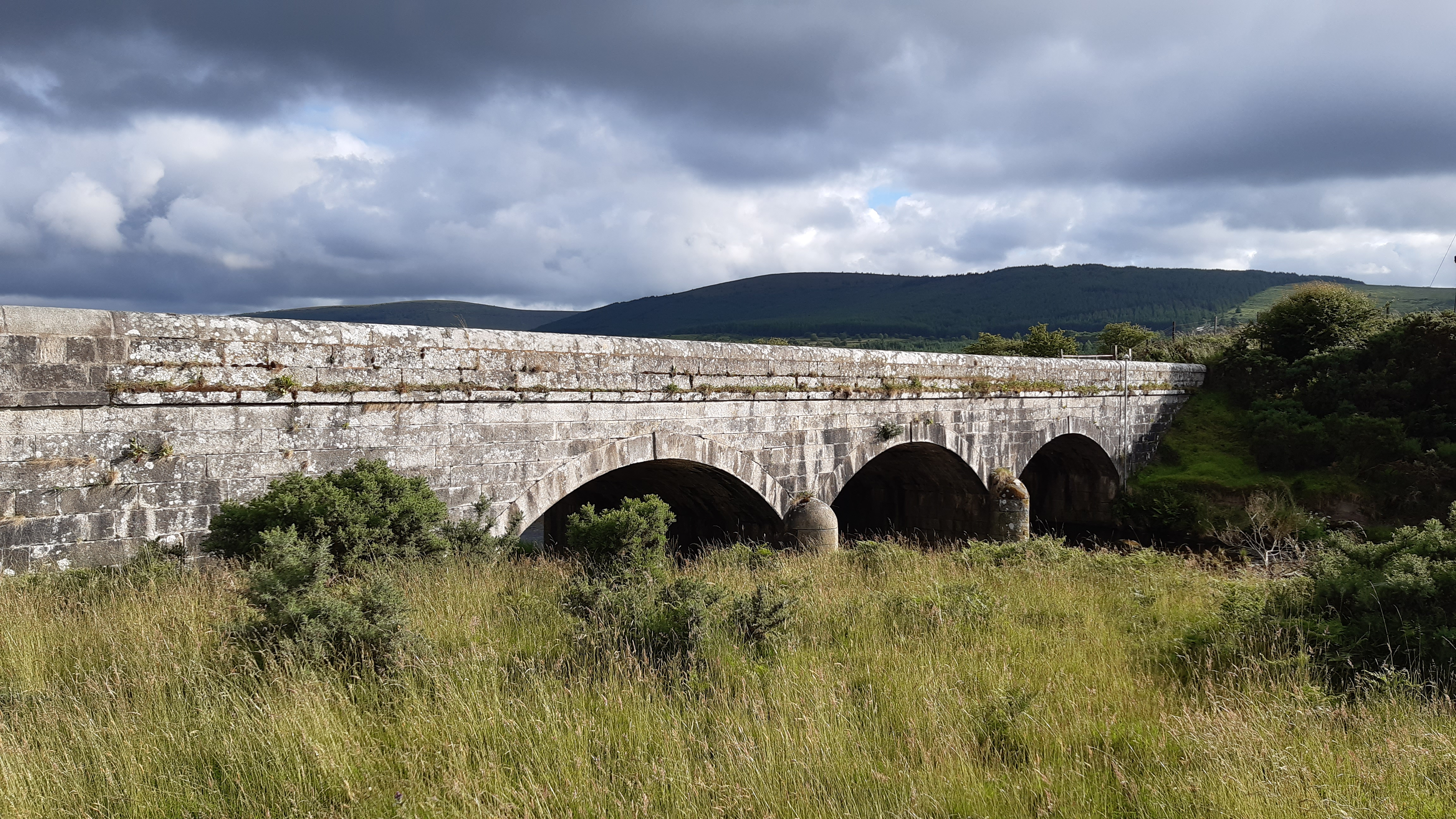
The bridge over the King's River

== See also ==
- Roads in Ireland
- National primary road
- National secondary road
