= Maura Scannell =

Botanist (1924-2011)

Mary J. P. (Maura) Scannell
- Born: 18 March 1924; Ireland
- Died: 1 November 2011 (aged 87); Cork University Hospital, Ireland
- Education: University College Cork
- Awards: Honorary member Botanical Society of the British Isles, 1995; National Botanic Gardens Medal, May 2008

Mary J. P. "Maura" Scannell (1924–2011) was a leading Irish botanist.

== Professional career ==
Scannell became Assistant Keeper of the Natural History Division of the National Museum, Ireland, 1949. She was an expert in the identification of woods and charcoals, leading her to identify the material used in all the Irish harps in the National Museum as well as from archaeological sites. The Botanical Society of Britain and Ireland called her "an inspiration to generations of botanists" for her taxonomic knowledge of seeds and fibres as well as microfungi and algae.

In 1970, she supervised the transfer of the National Herbarium from the National Museum in central Dublin to the National Botanic Gardens at Glasnevin. She was an active member of the Irish regional committee of the (now) Botanical Society of Britain and Ireland from 1963 to 1994. She was a judge in the Irish Young Scientists Exhibition from the 1960s. One of her most important contributions was in fostering a love of botany in others. She remained Head of the National Herbarium until she retired in 1989, but continued as an author, field botanist and visitor to the Herbarium.

== Scientific legacy ==
Her very wide knowledge within botany, particularly of Ireland and the Herbarium collection, is illustrated in the diversity of publications that acknowledge her contribution or advice: a follow-up to a record of Salix hibernica in Ireland in 1963 records her contribution of information from the Herbarium indicating the tree's presence in Ireland substantially earlier, in the 1880s; Identifying the species of reeds in a print of an oil painting in 1996 led to its identification as an important post-Famine Irish landscape painting; Identification of wood and charcoal fragments for archaeological excavations.

Over 200 scientific publications, books and floras are attributed to her, in addition to specimExpandens and field records deposited in the national Herbarium. The latter are among the largest contributions by any botanist. A new plant species was named after her in 2008, Hedlundia scannelliana (Maura Scannell's Whitebeam).

Scannell also supported the botanical publications of others. She assisted Evelyn Booth to produce The Flora of County Carlow (1979), the first Irish county flora to be written by a woman.

== Selected publications ==
- Scannell, MJP and Synnott, DM (1989) Sources for the Census Catalogue of the Flora of Ireland National Botanic Gardens, Ireland. ASIN: B000V9IBE2
- Webb, DA and Scannell, MJP (1983) Flora of Connemara and the Burren. Royal Dublin Society And Cambridge University Press, ISBN 9780521233958
- Scannell, MJP (1982). "Southern Elements in the cryptogamic flora of Ireland". J Life Sciences, Royal Dublin Society. 3 (1): 267–276.
- Scannell, MJP (1979). "A contribution to the fungus flora of West Galway Vice-County H-16 Ireland". Irish Naturalists' Journal. 19 (11): 395–397.
- Scannell, MJP (1978). "Hycopeltis arundinacea in Europe". Revue Algologique. 13 (1): 41–42.
- Scannell, MJP (1977). "The bryophyte collection of A L Kathleen King". Irish Naturalists' Journal. 19 (4): 130.
- Scannell, MJP (1976). "Hydrilla". Irish Naturalists' Journal. 18 (10): 327.
- Booth, EM; Scannell, MJP (1975). "Koeleria cristata as a constituent of ant hill flora". Irish Naturalists' Journal. 18 (7): 221.
- Scannell, MJP (1975). "The known distribution of Juncus planifolius in Ireland". Watsonia. 10 (4): 418–419.
- Scannell, MJP (1972). "Algal paper of Oedogonium sp. Its occurrence in the Burren, County Clare". Irish Naturalists' Journal. 17 (5): 147–152.
- Scannell, MJP (1972) Census Catalogue of the Flora in Ireland Paperback. Stationery Office. ASIN: B0006CRR94 pp 127
- Scannell, Mary J.P. and Synott, Donal M. 1972 Consus Catalogue of the Flora of Ireland. Dublin Stationery Office
- Scannell, MJP (1969). "Unpublished records of marine algae made mainly in County Waterford by Thomas Johnson and Matilda Knowles". Irish Naturalists' Journal. 16 (7): 192–198.
