= Avonmore River =

River in Ireland

Coordinates: 52°54′02″N 6°13′13″W

River Avonmore
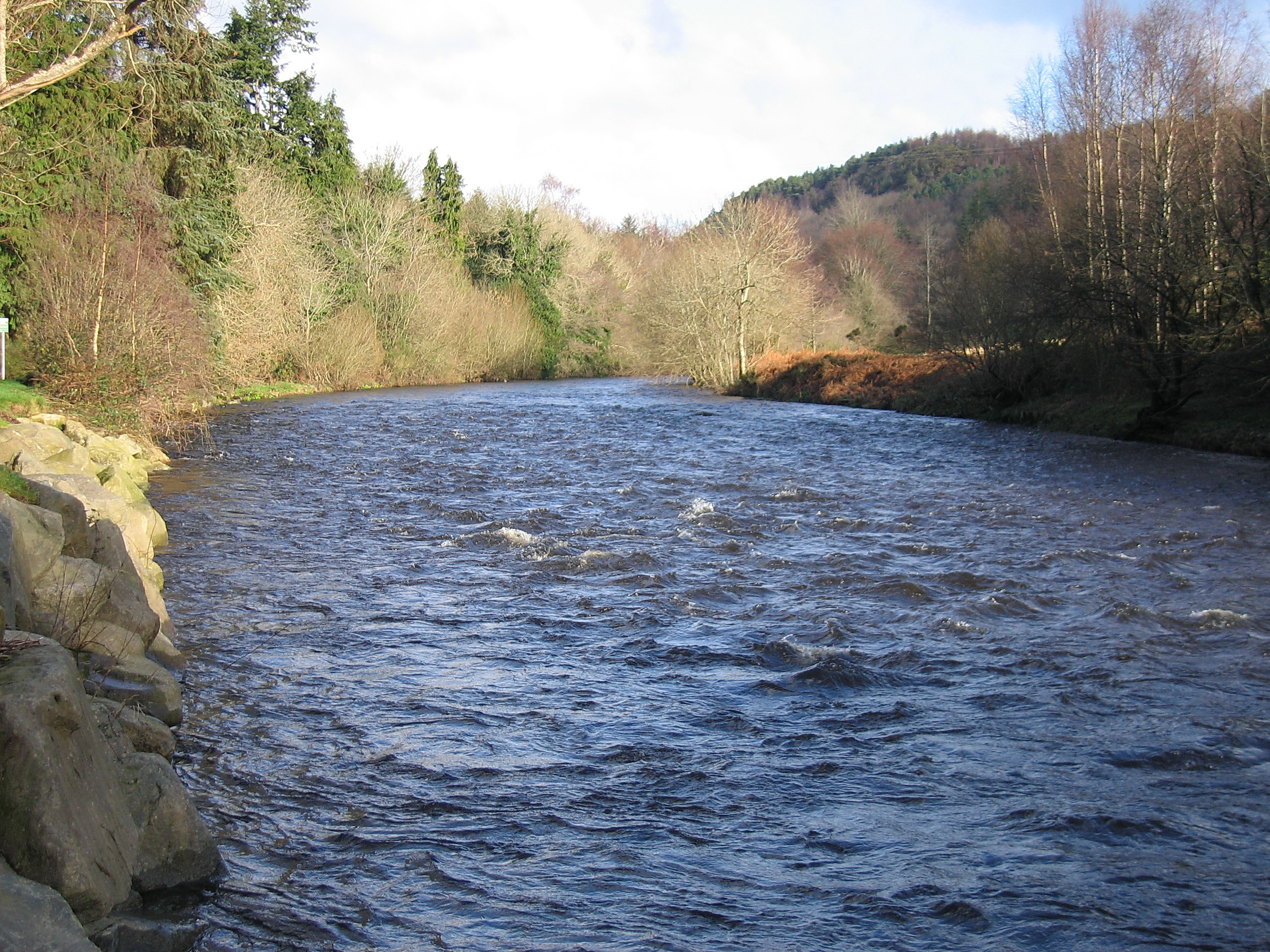
- The Avonmore between Avondale and The Meetings
- Native name: Abhainn Mór (Irish)

Physical characteristics
- Source
  - location: Lough Dan, County Wicklow
- Mouth: River Avoca
  - location: Meeting of the Waters, County Wicklow

The Avonmore River (Irish: An Abhainn Mhór, meaning 'the big river'), also known as Abhainn Dé (also spelt Abhainn Dea), flows from Lough Dan in the Wicklow Mountains west of Roundwood. It flows in a generally southerly direction for approximately 30 km (19 mi) before joining the Avonbeg at the Meeting of the Waters (Cumar an dá Uisce) to form the River Avoca, which in turn discharges into the Irish Sea at Arklow. From source to sea the river remains in East Wicklow.

Downstream from Lough Dan the Avonmore reaches the village of Annamoe where it is crossed by the R755 regional road. From there is descends to Laragh and down through a heavily wooded valley to Rathdrum. Near Rathdrum it passes through the grounds of Avondale House, former home of Charles Stewart Parnell. A few kilometers south of Avondale it meets the Avonbeg at the Meeting of the Waters.
