= River Vartry =

River in County Wicklow, Ireland

Coordinates: 53°03′35″N 6°12′24″W

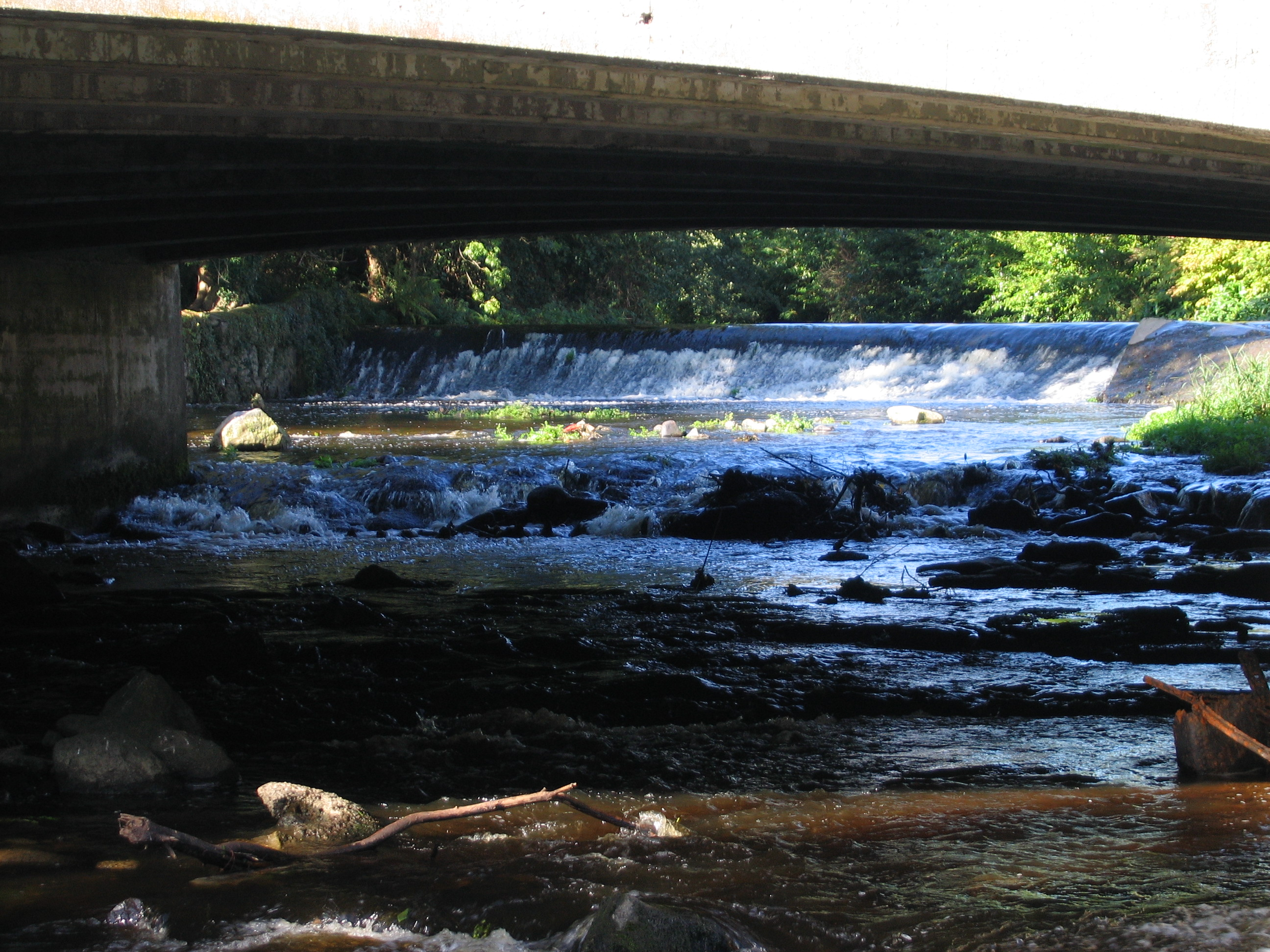
- River Vartry through Ashford
- Etymology: Old Irish fert, "mound, tumulus"
- Native name: Abhainn Fheartraí (Irish)

Physical characteristics
- Source
  - location: Calary Bog, County Wicklow
- Mouth
  - location: Irish Sea at Wicklow
- Length: 33 km (21 mi)

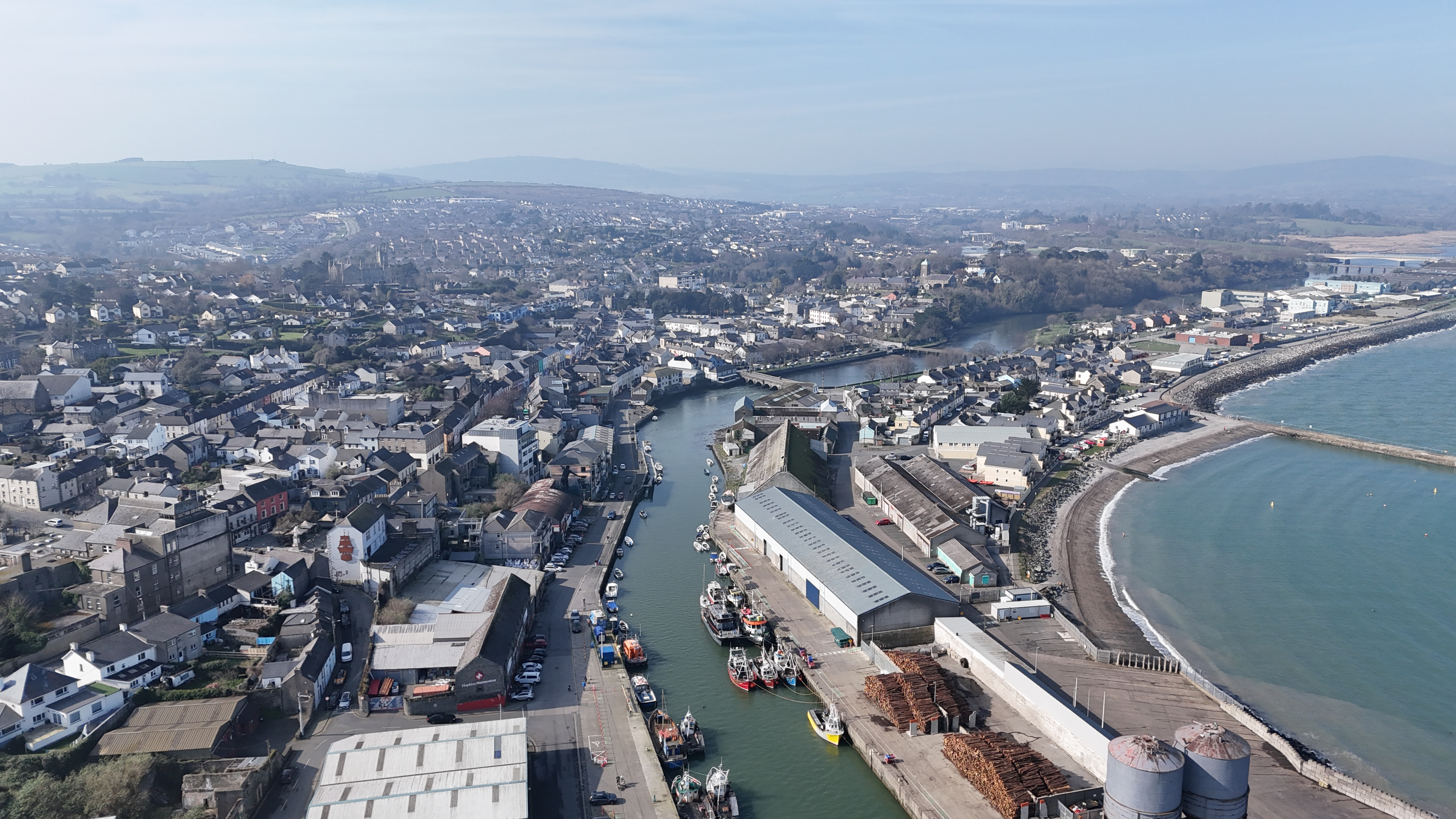
Last section of River Vartry at town of Wicklow before enter Wicklow Harbour

The River Vartry (/ˈvɑːrtriː/; Irish: Abhainn Fheartraí) is a river in County Wicklow, Ireland, and an important water source for the city of Dublin.

== Name ==
The river first appears in 12th-century records with the name Fertir or Fortir. This is believed to derive from an Old Irish term meaning "fortress", perhaps referring to a ringfort at Glasnamullen. Similar placenames are found at Forther, Forthar, Fortriu and Ferter in Scotland.

== Course ==
The Vartry rises in Calary Bog under the Great Sugar Loaf mountain in northern County Wicklow. Passing through a Dublin municipal reservoir complex, it flows east towards Ashford under Annagolan Bridge, and down through Devil's Glen. From there it passes the Nun's Cross Bridge (dating from the 18th century) on through Ashford, under the N11 road and continues eastwards into Broad Lough, which flows towards Wicklow town.

Broad Lough is a narrow lake which lies approximately 1 km north of Parnell Bridge in Wicklow town (at its closest point) and approximately 4 km north of Parnell Bridge (at its furthest point). This lake and surrounding wetlands evolved when a sand spit formed along the coastline cutting off the Vartry from its original egress. This sand spit is called The Murrough/Murragh and it carries the Dublin to Wicklow coastal railway line built in the 1860s. Broad Lough drains southwards into the Irish Sea through Wicklow town centre and harbour. The name of this stretch of water (approximately 1.5 km in length) is disputed. It is variously called the River Leitrim, the Broad Lough Estuary and the River Vartry.

== Historical references ==
According to The Life of St. Patrick and His Place in History the place where St. Patrick landed was at Inverdea, the mouth of the river Vartry in County Wicklow.

== City water supply ==
In 1861 Parliament passed the Dublin Waterworks Act creating a project to dam the River Vartry in Roundwood to form the Vartry Reservoir. The dam, accompanying waterworks, and a pipe tunnel through a part of the Wicklow Mountains, were completed in 1865, providing the first clean mass source of water for Dublin, replacing water obtained from the canals.

The Vartry Reservoir and Waterworks still supply some 200,000 homes, providing 40% of all of Dublin's water needs.

== Popular culture ==
There are several references to the Vartry in James Joyce's Ulysses, "... and on his expressed desire for some beverage to drink Mr Bloom in view of the hour it was and there being no pump of Vartry water available for their ablutions let alone drinking purposes..." or "Power. Particular about his drink. Flaw in the glass, fresh Vartry water." Likewise, in Finnegans Wake, Joyce refers to the reservoir, writing "Water, water, darty water!"

== See also ==
- Rivers of Ireland
