= Vale of Clara =

Nature reserve in County Wicklow, Ireland

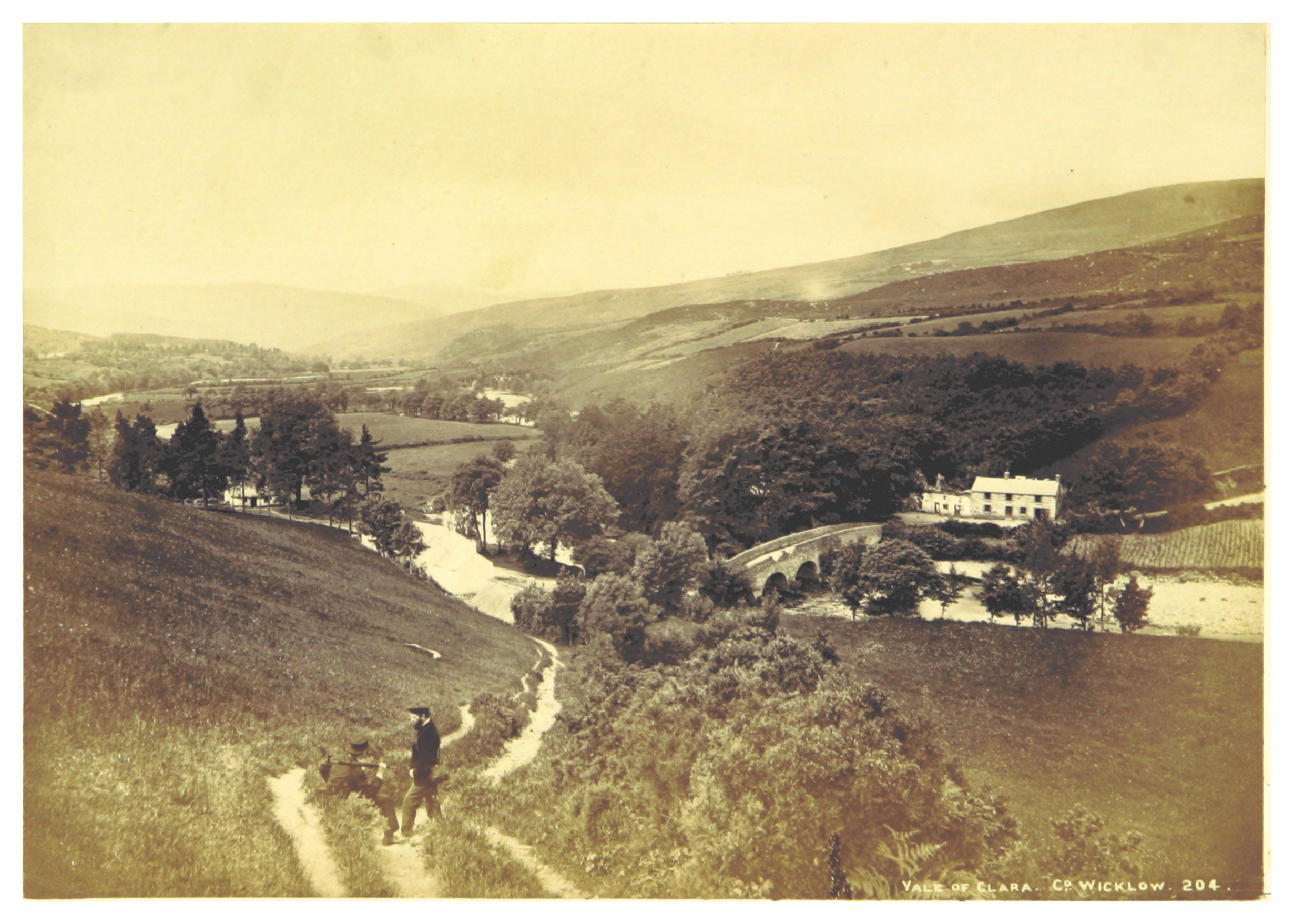

- Location within Ireland
- Type: National
- Location: County Wicklow
- Coordinates: 52°56′31″N 6°14′20″W
- Area: 545 acres (220.55 ha)
- Operator: National Parks and Wildlife Service (Ireland)
- Status: Open all year

Vale of Clara (Irish: Gleann an Chláraigh) is a national nature reserve of approximately 545 acres (2.21 km^{2}) located in County Wicklow, Ireland. It is managed by the Irish National Parks & Wildlife Service, part of the Department of Housing, Local Government and Heritage.

== Features ==
The Vale of Clara was legally protected as a national nature reserve by the Irish government in 1983. The Special Area of Conservation, Ballygannon Wood, is contained within the Vale of Clara nature reserve.

The Vale of Clara, sometimes known as Clara Vale Forest, is a fragmented oak woodland set over a large area, with the largest semi-natural woods in County Wicklow. It is possibly the largest native hardwood wood in Ireland. This area has been partially covered in trees since the Ice Age. There is also a variety of hazel, willow, holly, and birch trees as well as bluebells, bilberry, honeysuckle, and wood sorrel. Some of the birds which inhabit the woodlands include buzzards, woodcock, tree-creepers, and redstarts alongside fallow deer.

== See also ==
- Clara Lara FunPark
