= R764 road (Ireland) =

Road in Ireland

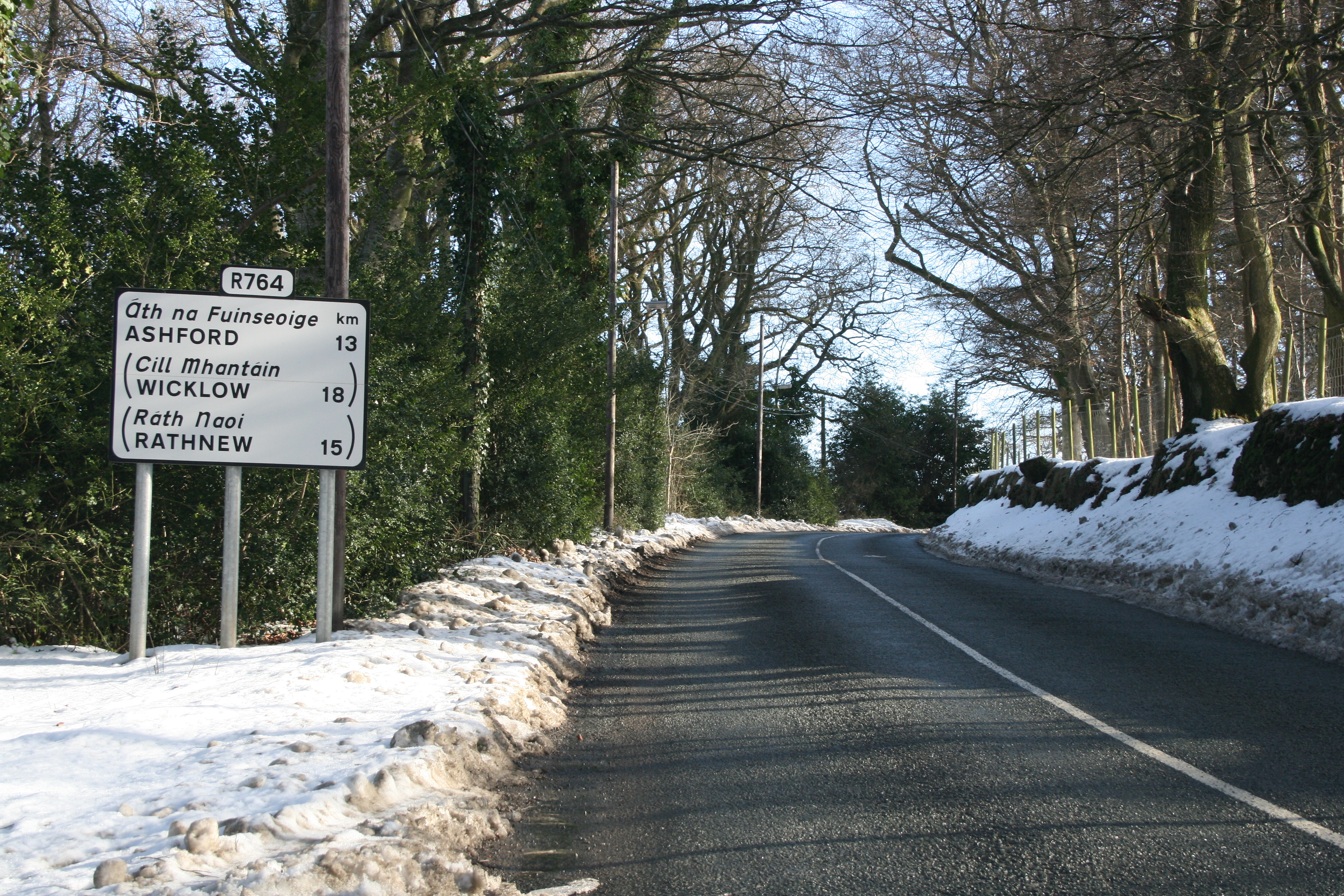
R764 leaving Roundwood

The R764 road is a regional road in Ireland joining the villages of Roundwood and Ashford in County Wicklow.

The road is 13km long.

== Route ==
The road starts eastwards at a junction with the R755 in the village of Roundwood and terminates in Ashford at the R772 (the former N11 national primary road).

== See also ==
- Roads in Ireland
- National primary road
- National secondary road
