= Rod Tuach =

Irish photographer

- Born: 1945 (age 80–81); Dublin, Ireland
- Occupation: photographer
- Years active: 1970s–present
- Spouse: Roberta Reeners (until 2021, her death)

Rodney Tuach (born 1945) is an Irish photographer. He is a member of Aosdána, an association of Irish artists.

== Early life ==
Tuach was born in Dublin in 1945. He became interested in photography when working in a film processing laboratory, having earlier worked in advertising.

== Career ==
Tuach has worked as a freelance photographer for books, magazines and films. He has worked as a theatre photographer and still photographer.

He distinguished between his commercial work and his creative work, "a very personal way of reacting to what goes on about me. It is a translation of the joy and sorrow of what I see. […] It is a fusion of inner feeling and an exterior event, and it is a way of freeing oneself."

Tuach was among the first inductees to Aosdána in 1983. In 1998 he added a self-portrait to The National Self-Portrait Collection of Ireland. In 2001, he was one of the first photographers to be invited to exhibit his work at the Royal Hibernian Academy's annual show. In 2003 his short digital film In Lourdes, was shown at the Galway Film Fleadh.

== Personal life ==
Tuach lives in Ashford, County Wicklow. He was married to Roberta Reeners, an American publishing consultant and journalist, until her death in 2021.

== Films ==
- In Lourdes (2003) – short
