= R755 road (Ireland) =

Road in Ireland

Coordinates: 53°00′03″N 6°17′58″W

R755 road
- Bóthar R755
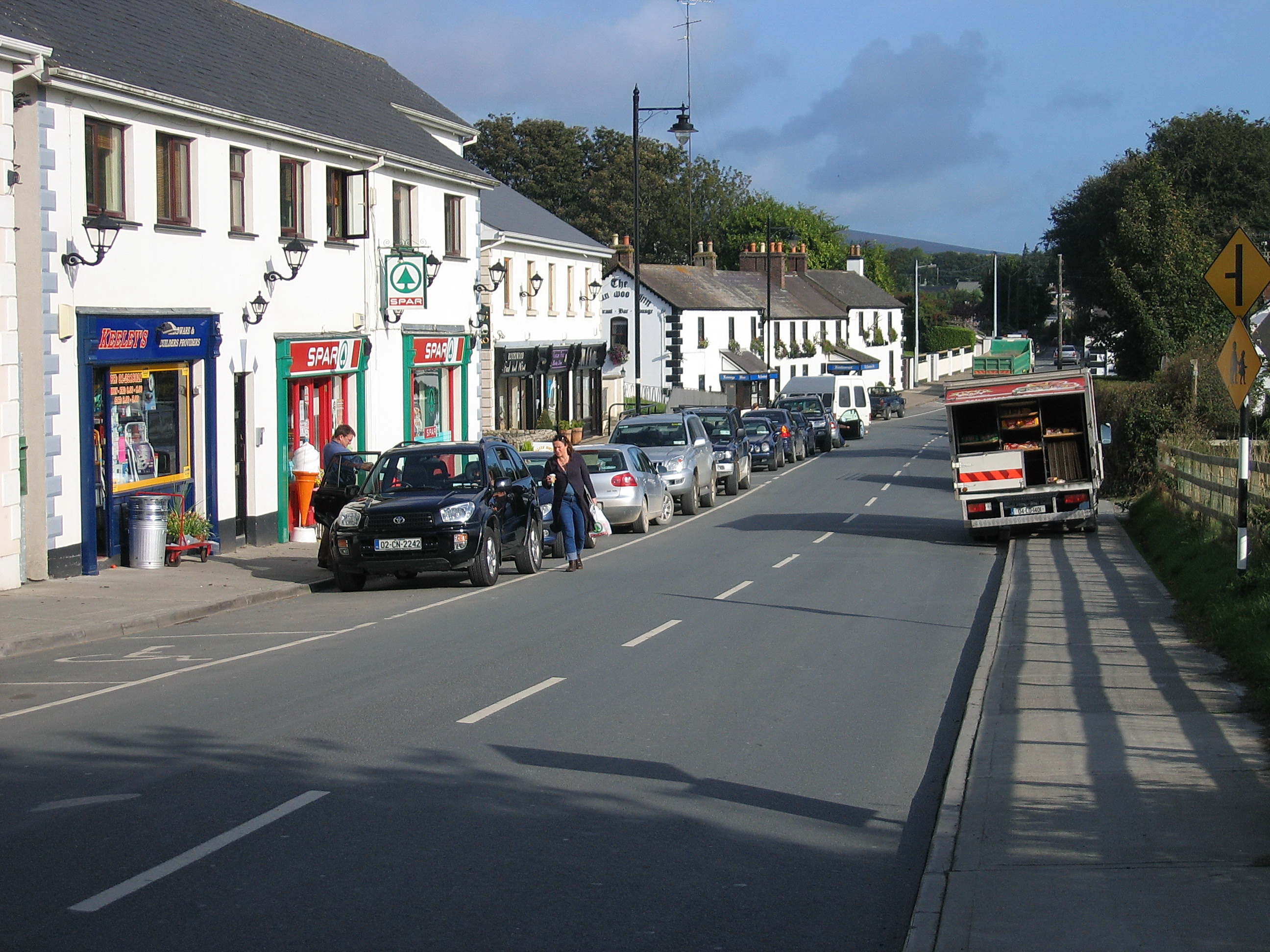
- R755 passing through Roundwood

Route information
- Length: 36 km (22 mi)

Location
- Country: Ireland
- Primary destinations: Kilmacanogue; Rathdrum

Highway system
- Roads in Ireland; Motorways; Primary; Secondary; Regional

The R755 road is a regional road in Ireland. It runs for its entire length in County Wicklow. From the village of Kilmacanogue on the N11 national primary road it goes north/south for 36 km (22 mi) to the town of Rathdrum.

== Route ==
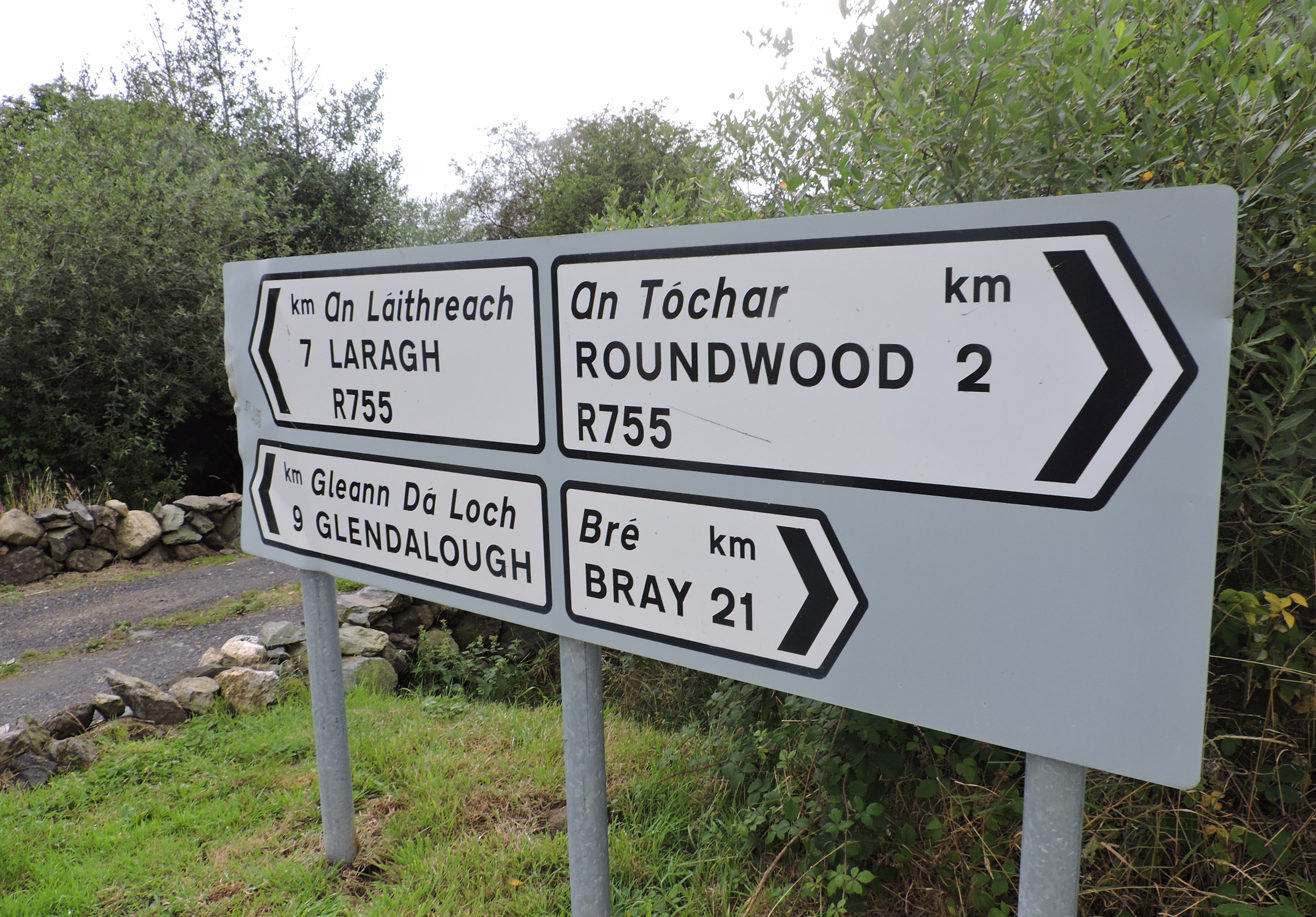
Junction south of Roundwood

From the N11 it goes west through the Rocky Valley and then turns south and rises sharply at the foot of the Sugar Loaf Mountain and crosses the Calary Bog to a junction with the eastern end of the Sally Gap road (R759) 3 km (1.9 mi) north of Roundwood village. It continues south through Roundwood and the hamlet of Annamoe to Laragh where it meets the Military Road and the Wicklow Gap Road. From Laragh it follows the Avonmore River for 12 km (7.5 mi) through dense conifer forests and oak woods before terminating in the town of Rathdrum at a junction with the R752.

Like the other main regional roads in the Wicklow Mountains, the R115, R759, R756, R752 and R747 this road passes through some wonderful scenery.

== See also ==
- Roads in Ireland
- National primary road
- National secondary road
- Clara, County Wicklow
