= Roundwood =

Village in County Wicklow, Ireland

Roundwood Irish: An Tóchar
- Village
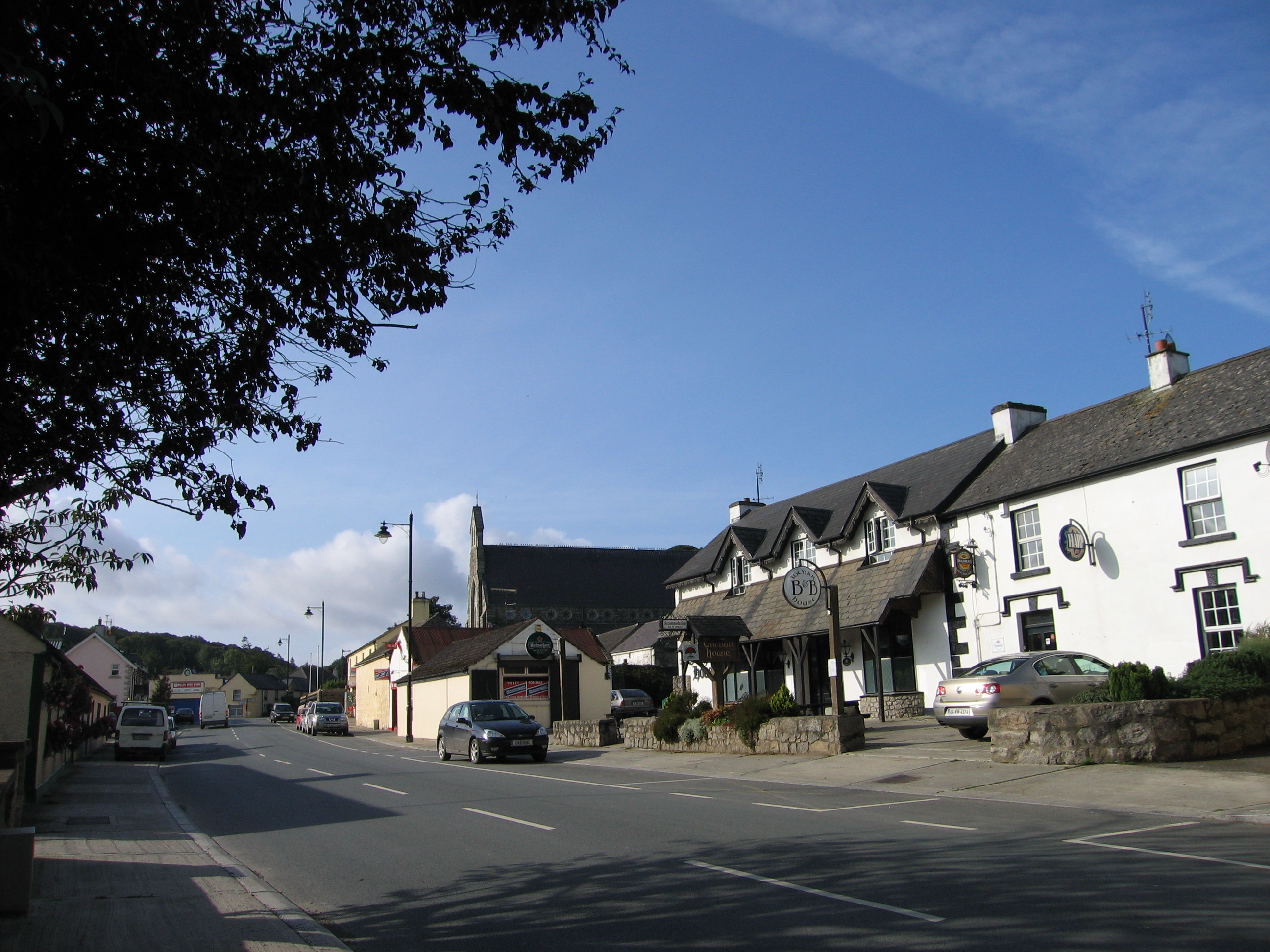
- Roundwood's Main Street

- Location in Ireland
- Coordinates: 53°04′N 6°14′W
- Country: Ireland
- Province: Leinster
- County: Wicklow
- Elevation: 238 m (781 ft)

Population (2022)
  - Total: 907
- Time zone: UTC+0 (WET)
  - Summer (DST): UTC-1 (IST (WEST))
- Eircode (Routing Key): A98
- Irish Grid Reference: O187029

Roundwood, historically known as Togher (Irish: an Tóchar [ənˠ ˈt̪ˠoːxəɾˠ], 'the causeway'), is a village in County Wicklow, Ireland. As of the 2022 census, Roundwood had a population of 907 people.

== Geography ==
Roundwood is located where the R755 road joins the R764 and R765. The R755 is part of the main route from Dublin to Glendalough in the Wicklow Mountains. At 238 metres above sea level, Roundwood is one of the highest villages in Ireland. The Vartry Reservoir (reservoir lakes built in the 1860s) is close by.

== History ==
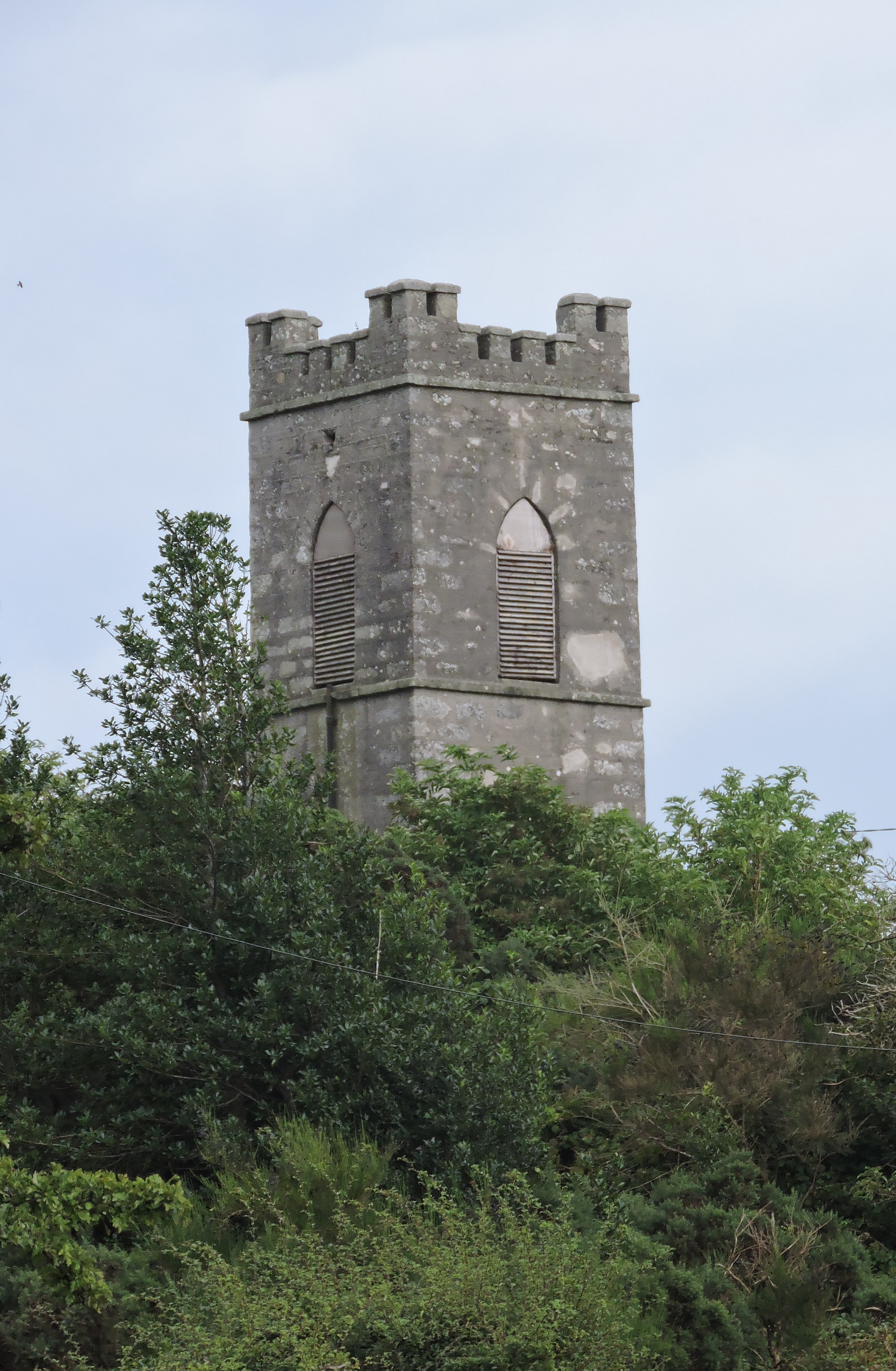
Derrylossary church

Roundwood has a connection with two former Presidents of Ireland. Seán T. O'Kelly (1882–1966) lived at Roundwood Park, an early 19th-century country house that was subsequently "remodelled in castle style". Erskine Hamilton Childers (1905–1974) is buried in Derrylossary Church of Ireland churchyard near the village. This Church of Ireland (Anglican) church was built c. 1820 and is now disused. The local Catholic church, the Church of Saint Laurence O'Toole, was built between 1867 and 1871 and faces onto Roundwood's main street. Both churches are included in the Record of Protected Structures maintained by Wicklow County Council. Several other structures in the area, including several buildings associated with the Vartry Reservoir, are also listed as protected structures.

== Sport ==
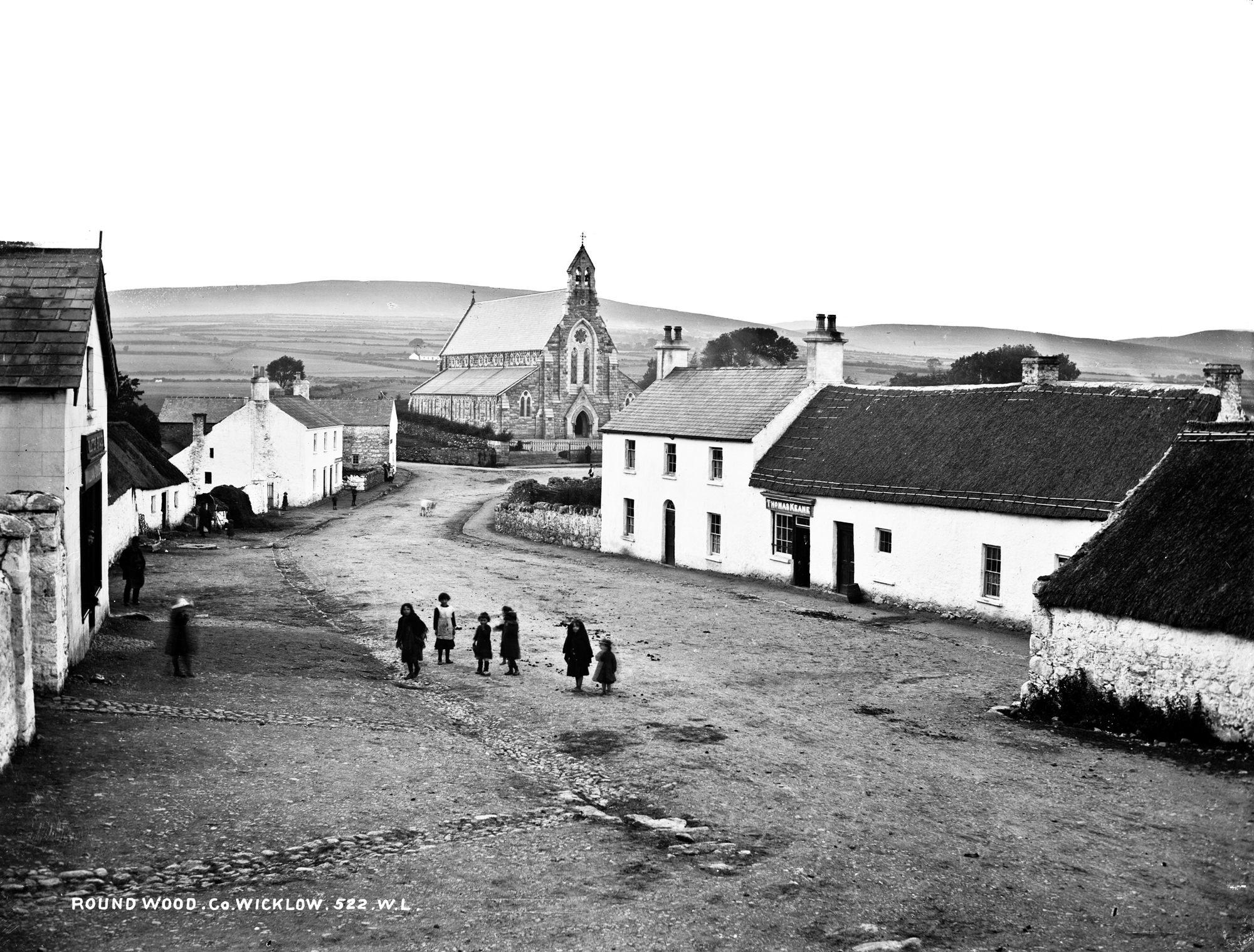
Roundwood c. 1880.

The local Gaelic football and ladies' Gaelic football club is An Tóchar GAA.

== Twin towns — sister cities ==
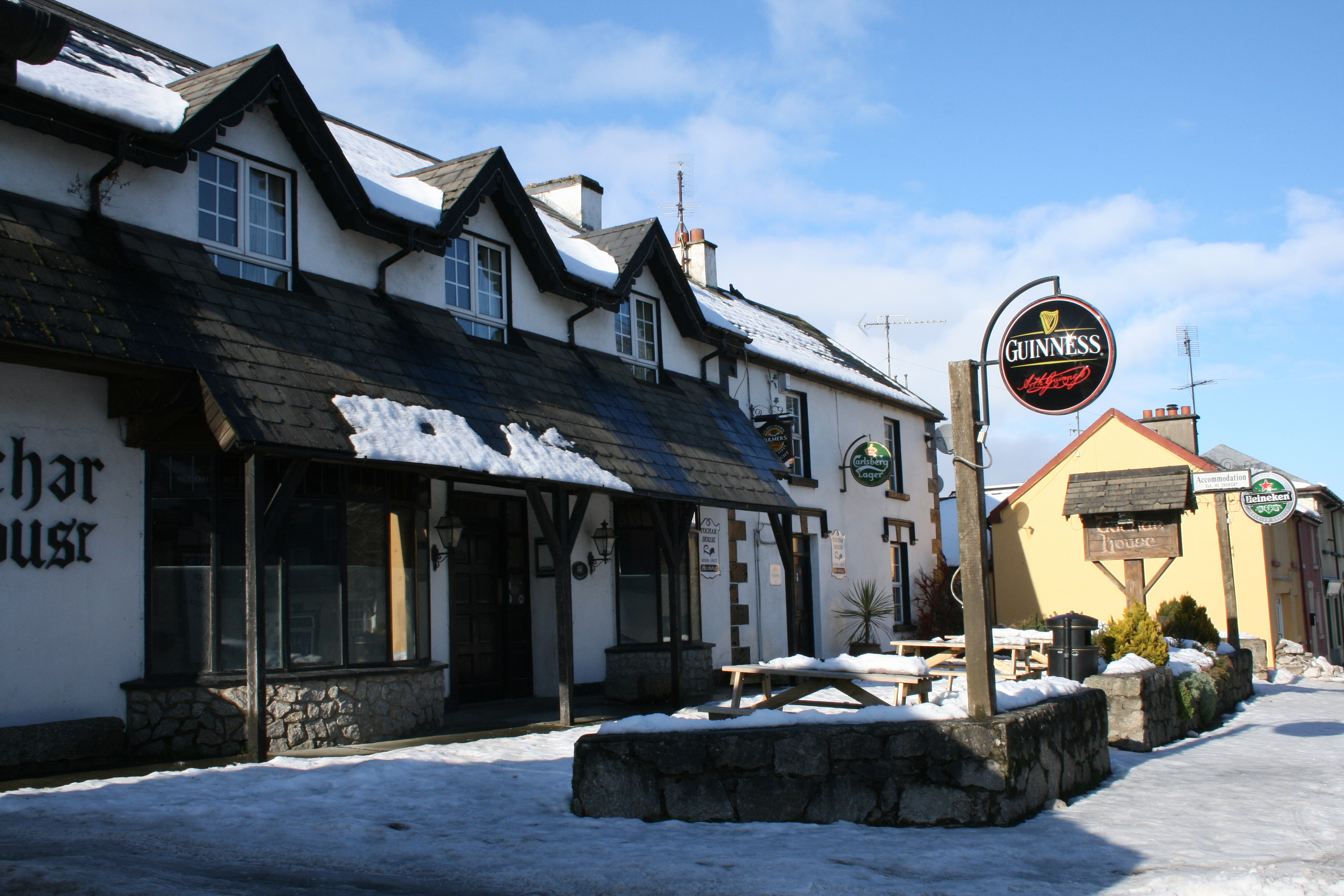
Pub in Roundwood

Roundwood is twinned with the village of Spézet, in Brittany, northwestern France.

== See also ==
- List of towns and villages in Ireland
- List of twin towns and sister cities in Ireland
