= Laragh, County Wicklow =

Village in County Wicklow, Ireland

Laragh Irish: An Láithreach
- Village
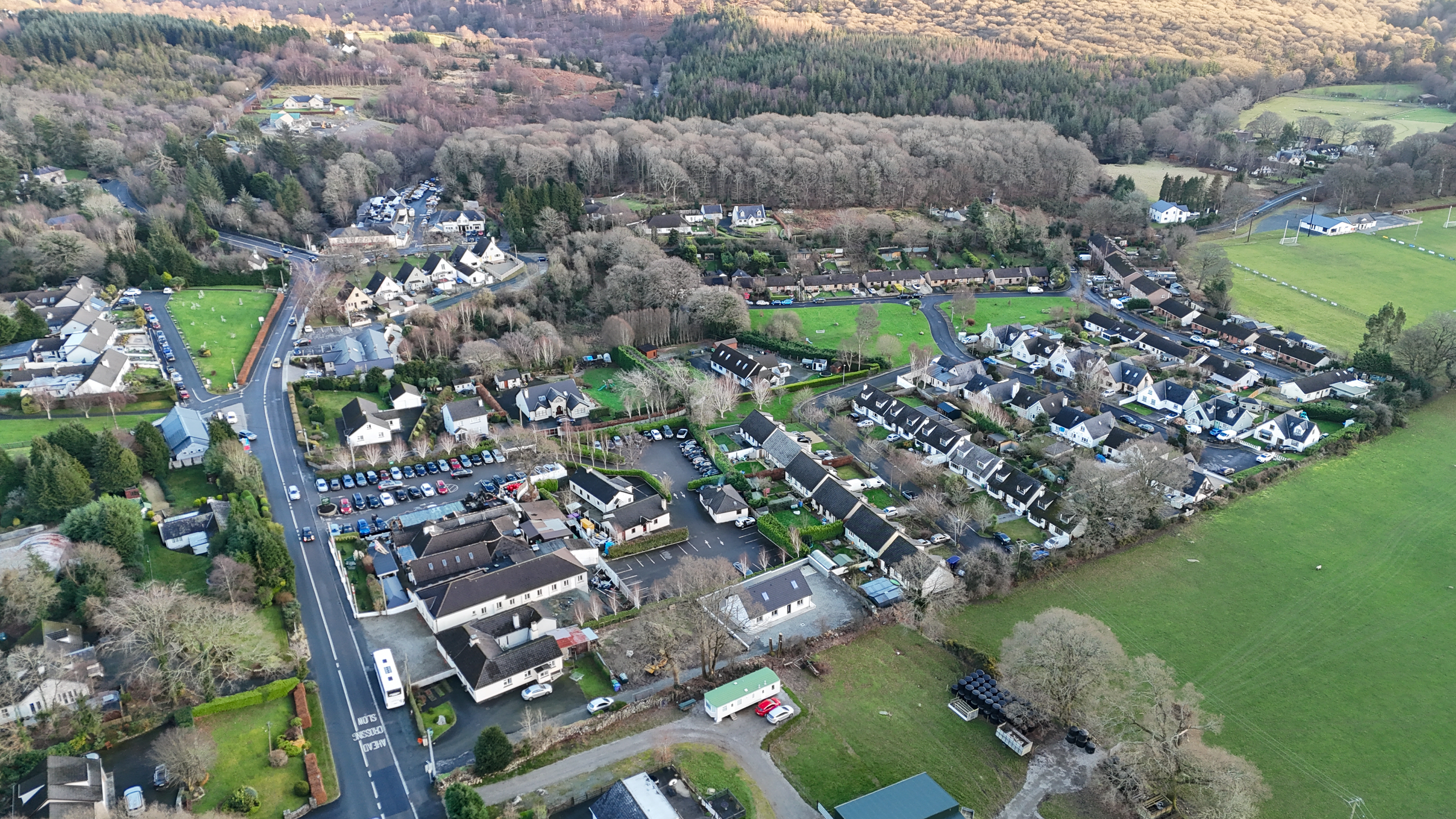
- Aerial photo of Laragh

- Location in Ireland
- Coordinates: 53°00′33″N 6°17′44″W
- Country: Ireland
- Province: Leinster
- County: County Wicklow
- Elevation: 140 m (460 ft)

Population (2016)
  - Urban: 342
- Time zone: UTC+0 (WET)
  - Summer (DST): UTC-1 (IST (WEST))
- Irish Grid Reference: T140966

Laragh (Irish: An Láithreach – meaning "the site, or ruins, of a building") is a small village in County Wicklow, Ireland. It lies at the junction of three roads (the R115, R755, and R756) through the Wicklow Mountains and is primarily known for its proximity to the monastic settlement of Glendalough. Sally Gap and the Glenmacnass Waterfall are to the north, to the west is Glendalough and the Wicklow Gap, and to the south is the Glenmalure Valley.

The area is wooded, with the hills and mountains rising directly from the valley, and hill walkers, hikers, and other tourists sometimes use the village – given its closeness to Dublin – as their centre for recreational activities in the mountains. About 5 km from the village, on the Rathdrum road, the Clara Lara FunPark covers an area of some 40 ha. Birdwatchers come here to look for the great spotted woodpecker, Ireland's newest species, which breeds in the area.

Laragh is also sometimes (including on Sunday mornings and lunchtime) used as a meeting and stop-off point for motorcyclists and cyclists following a run over "The Gap" (the R756) before they head on to Rathdrum.

"Laragh" is the name of a fictional sheep station in Western Australia run by the Regan family in Nevil Shute's novel Beyond the Black Stump.

== Notable people ==
Former or current residents of the village have included:

- Francis Stuart (1902–2000), Irish writer lived for a time in Laragh Castle

== See also ==
- List of towns and villages in Ireland
