= County Kilkenny =

County in Ireland

County Kilkenny Contae Chill Chainnigh
- County
- Coat of arms
- Etymology: Named after Kilkenny
- Nickname: The Marble County
- Anthem: The Rose of Mooncoin
- Interactive map of County Kilkenny
- Coordinates: 52°35′N 7°15′W
- Country: Ireland
- Province: Leinster
- Region: Southern
- Osraige: about 150
- Shire of Kilkenny: after 1172
- Earldom of Ormond: about 1328
- Earldom of Ossory: about 1528
- County of Kilkenny: by 1610
- Founder: Óengus Osrithe
- Named for: St. Canice
- City: Kilkenny

Government
  - Local authority: Kilkenny County Council
  - Dáil constituency: Carlow–Kilkenny; Tipperary North
  - EP constituency: South

Area
  - Total: 2,073 km^{2} (800 sq mi)
  - Rank: 16th
- Highest elevation (Brandon Hill): 515 m (1,690 ft)

Population (2022)
  - Total: 103,685
  - Rank: 21st
  - Density: 50.02/km^{2} (129.5/sq mi)
- Demonym: Cat
- Eircode: E41, R95 (primarily)
- Area code(s): + 353 56 & 353 51
- ISO 3166 code: IE-KK
- Number plate: KK
- Website: Official website

County Kilkenny (Irish: Contae Chill Chainnigh) is a county in Ireland. It is in the province of Leinster and is part of the Southern Region. It is named after the city of Kilkenny. (Note: Kilkenny's status as a city is recognised in s. 22A of the Local Government Act 2001.) Kilkenny County Council is the local authority for the county. At the 2022 census the population of the county was 103,685. The county was based on the historic Gaelic kingdom of Ossory (Osraighe), which was coterminous with the Diocese of Ossory.

== Geography and subdivisions ==
Kilkenny is the 16th-largest of Ireland's 32 counties by area and the 21st-largest in terms of population. It is the third-largest of Leinster's 12 counties in size, the seventh-largest in terms of population, and has a population density of 50 people per km2. Kilkenny borders five counties – Tipperary to the west, Waterford to the south, Carlow and Wexford to the east, and Laois to the north. Kilkenny city is the county's seat of local government and largest settlement, and is situated on the River Nore in the centre of the county. Kilkenny city is approximately 50 km (31 mi) from Waterford, 124 km (77 mi) from Dublin and 150 km (93 mi) from Cork.

=== Physical geography ===
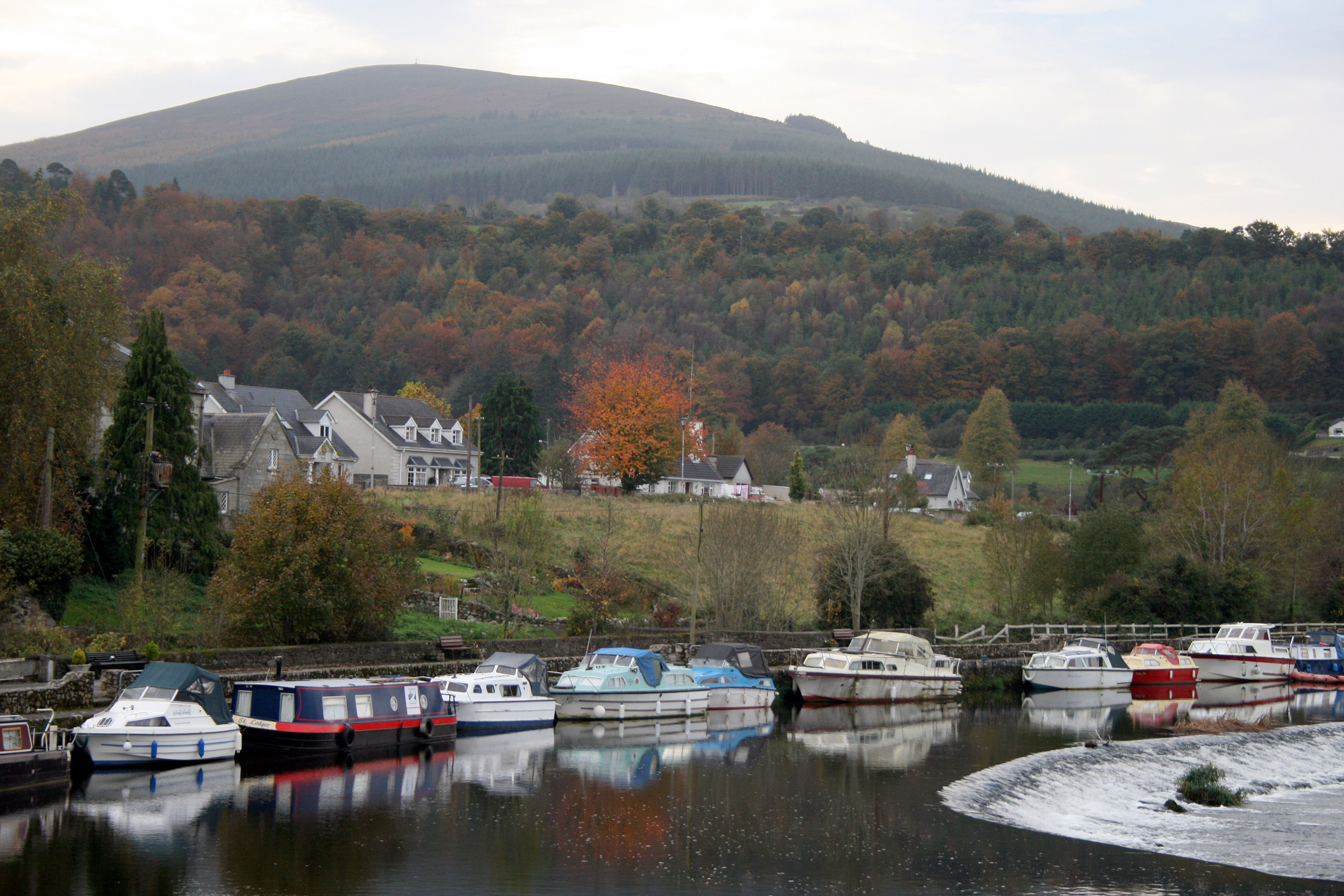
The River Barrow at Graiguenamanagh

The River Nore flows through the county, and the River Suir forms the border with County Waterford. Brandon Hill is the highest point with an elevation of 515 m (1,690 ft). Most of the county has a hilly surface of moderate elevation with uplands in the north-east, the north-west and the South of the county; the middle is lower by comparison.

The county is located at 52°35′N 7°15′W and has an area of 512,222 acres (2,072.89 km^{2}; 800.347 sq mi). The county extends from 52 degrees 14 minutes to 52 degrees 52 minutes north latitude, and from 6 degrees 56 minutes to 7 degrees 37 minutes west longitude. The north–south length of the county is 45 miles (72 km); and its greatest breadth from east to west, is about 23 miles (37 km) and its narrowest part is about 12 miles (19 km) from where it widens irregularly towards the north.

Kilkenny extends southward from Laois to the valley of the Suir and eastward from the Munster–Leinster border to the River Barrow. The River Nore bisects the county, and the River Barrow and River Suir are natural boundaries to the east and south of the county. County Kilkenny is bordered by Laois, Carlow, Wexford, Waterford and Tipperary.

==== Rivers ====
The main rivers in County Kilkenny, called the Three Sisters, are the Nore, Barrow and Suir. The River Nore bisects the county and flows through Ballyragget, Kilkenny City and the villages of Bennettsbridge, Thomastown and Inistioge. The River Suir forms the border between County Waterford and County Kilkenny.

The Barrow forms part of the county's eastern boundary. Tributaries of the Barrow in the county include the Gowran River and the Ballyvalden River (with its tributary the Monefelim River).

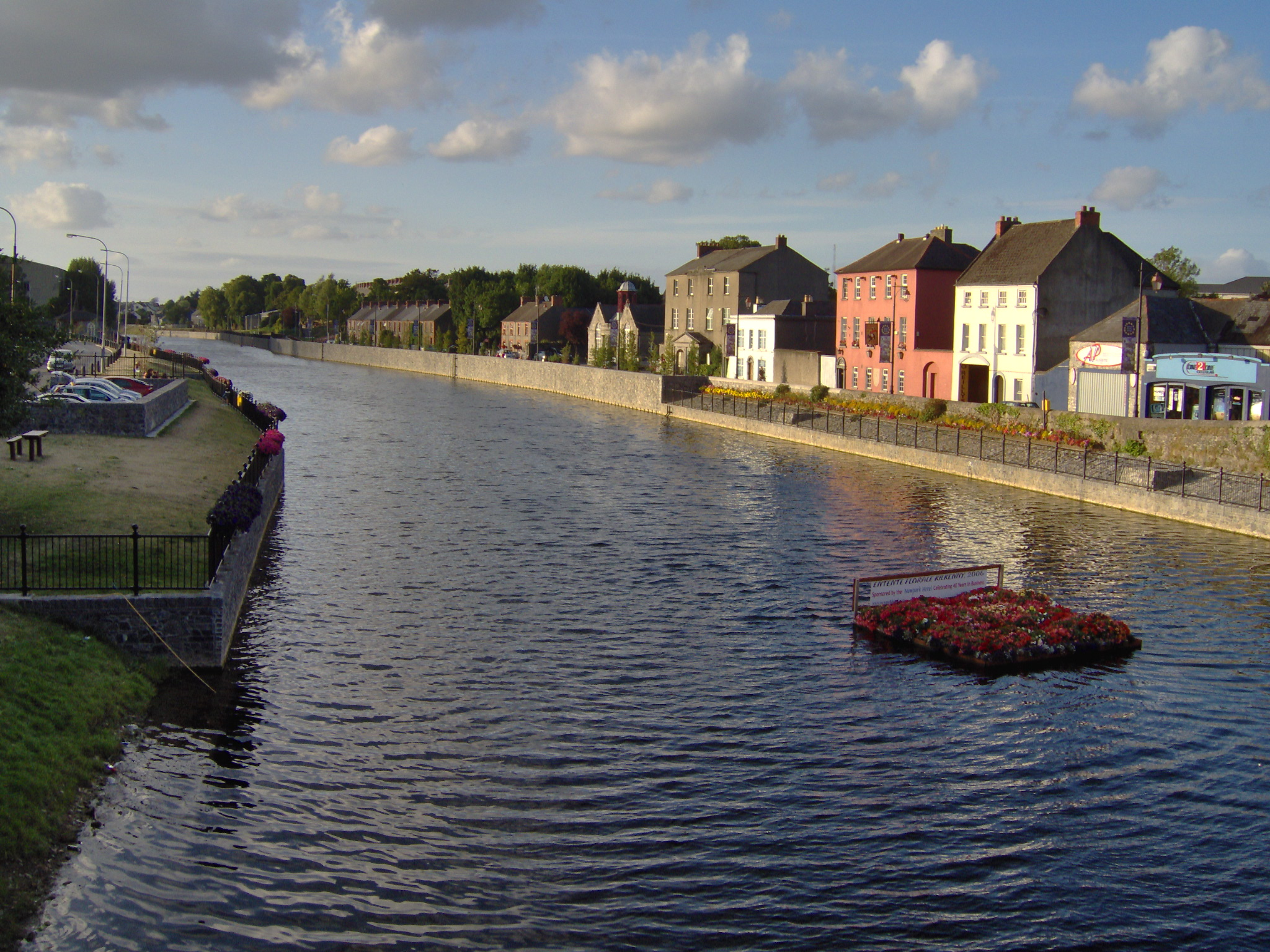
The River Nore at Kilkenny

Although County Kilkenny lies inland it has access to the sea via Belview Port, Port of Waterford, on the Suir Estuary and via New Ross on the River Barrow. On the River Barrow, from the villages of Goresbridge and Graiguenamanagh, there is a navigable river with traditional barges to the River Shannon or to Dublin Bay. Kilkenny's river network helps drain the land giving the county a highly fertile lower central plain.

Kings River and the Dinan are used for canoeing and kayaking as they contain stretches of peaceful waterways and a number of weirs and rapids. The wide and meandering Rivers Nore and Barrow are used for angling, boating and water sports.

==== Protected areas ====
Special Areas of Conservation, under the European Union Habitats Directive, in County Kilkenny includes Hugginstown Fen south-west of Ballyhale, The Loughans near Urlingford, Cullahill Mountain on the Castlecomer Plateau near Johnstown, Spahill and Clomantagh Hill which form part of an escarpment which links the Slieveardagh Hills with the Castlecomer Plateau, Galmoy Fen north of Johnstown, Lower River Suir south of Thurles, the freshwater stretches of the Barrow/River Nore and Thomastown Quarry, near Thomastown.

In 2005 Coan Bogs was defined as a Natural Heritage Area under section 18 of the Wildlife Act 2000. The blanket bog consists of two small areas of upland blanket bog located near Castlecomer in the townlands of Coan East and Smithstown. Bedrock geology for both areas is shale overlain locally by glacial till and blanket bog vegetation is well developed.

Fiddown Island is a 62.6 ha state-owned Nature Reserve established in 1988. Near Fiddown along the River Suir it consists of a long narrow island of marsh/woodland covered in willow scrub and bordered by reed swamps – it is the only known site of its type in Ireland.

==== Wildlife ====
The wildlife of County Kilkenny is part of the county's biodiversity and is an environmental, economic, amenity and resource.

Fauna of County Kilkenny includes hedgehogs, otters, badgers, red foxes, and bats such as Leisler's bat, Daubenton's bat, the brown long-eared bat and the common pipistrelle. There is also sika deer, fallow deer, stoat, red squirrel and pygmy shrew. The bird nesting period is from 1 March until 1 September. Woodlands, trees and hedgerows form a network of habitats, ecological 'corridors' essential for wildlife to flourish and move between habitats.

Flora of County Kilkenny includes the endangered autumn crocus, also rare species such as the bog orchid, the Killarney fern and the tufted salt-marsh grass. There are also vulnerable species like lesser snapdragon, meadow barley, small-white orchid, opposite-leaved pondweed, betony, red hemp nettle, narrow-leaved helleborine, lanceolate spleenwort, annual knawel and basil thyme.

==== Woodlands ====
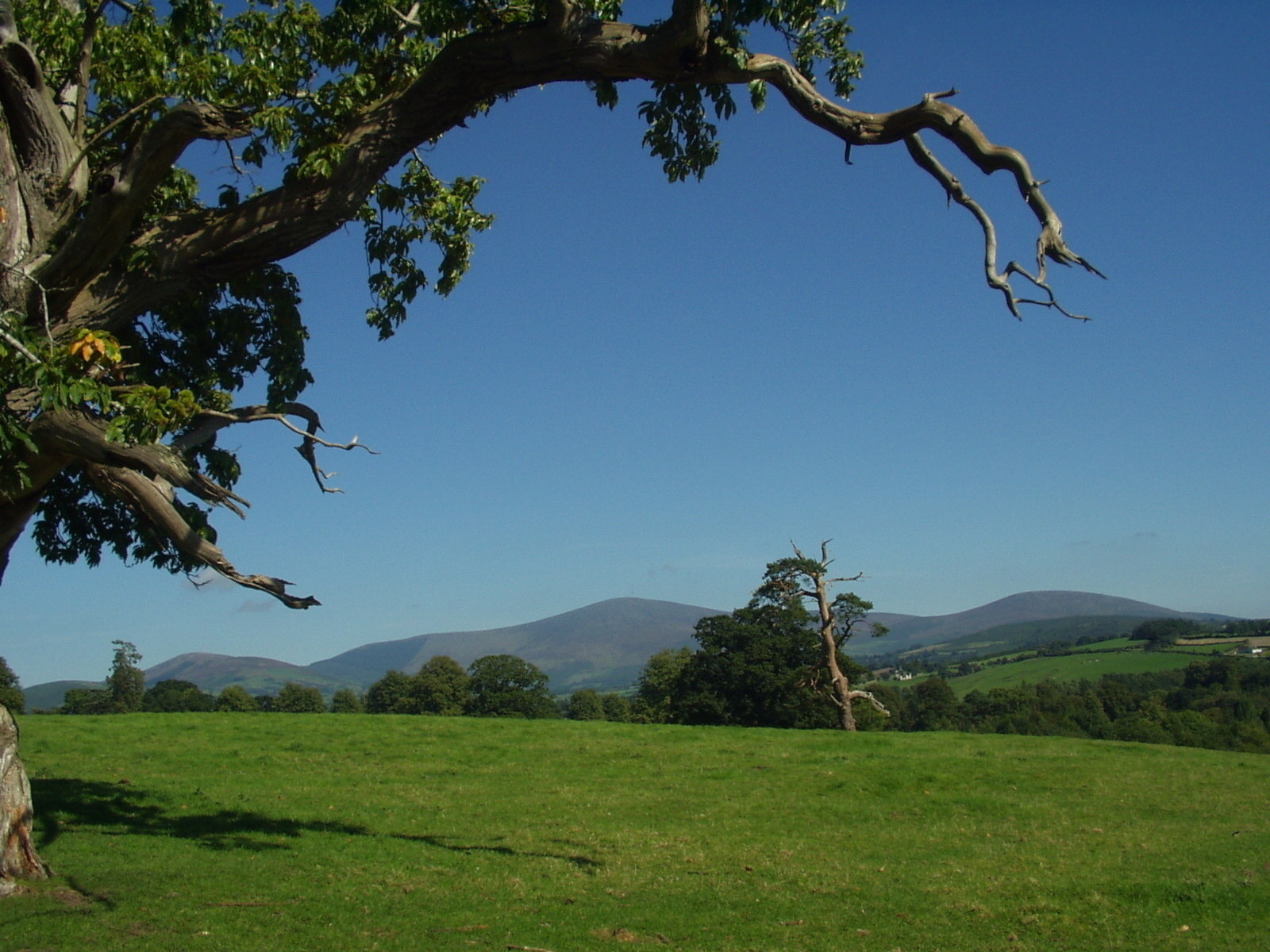
Kilkenny countryside looking west near Graiguenamanagh.

Surveys of woodlands of County Kilkenny include A Woodland Survey of Kilkenny, undertaken in 1997 to identify woodlands in the county and A survey of broadleaved woodlands in three special Areas of Conservation, Barrow-Nore, River Unshin and Lough Forbes (2000) which covers some of County Kilkenny, and National Survey of Native Woodlands (NSNW) 2003–2008 which was one of the largest ecological surveys to be completed in Ireland and did its fieldwork in the county in 2003.

Estimates of the woodlands in County Kilkenny include the Forest Inventory Planning System (1998) which estimated Kilkenny had 2251 ha of mixed woodland and broadleaf woodland not dominated by beech, representing 1.09% of the county and the National Forest Inventory 2004 and 2006 which estimated that 4430 ha of the county is native forested land, Scots pine was regarded as non-native, representing 2.15% of the county. (Note: The Forest Inventory Planning System 1998 (FIPS) is a GIS-based inventory of forest cover in Ireland produced from aerial photographs and satellite imagery. The National Forest Inventory (NFI) extrapolated its estimates from a systematic field sampling the FIPS sites between 2004 and 2006.) (Note: The considerable difference between these estimates may be attributed to differences the criteria and other factors, however, this increase may reflect genuine expansion of woodland.)

The best quality sites in the county in terms of their conservation value include Kylecorragh Wood (SAC) along the River Nore, Grenan Wood (SAC), Knockadrina, Garryricken North (NHA/SNR), Ballytobin/Ballaghtobin, Brownstown Wood (NHA/SAC), Kyleadohir Wood (NHA/SNR), Brown's Wood, Thomastown, Ballykeeffe Wood, Cullentragh, Rossenarra, Newrath and Garryricken South. The most threatened forested area in the county is Greatwood.

The main governmental organisations responsible for ensuring the development of forestry within Kilkenny are the National Parks and Wildlife Service (under the Department of Housing, Local Government and Heritage) and the Forest Service (under the Department of Agriculture, Food and the Marine). There are legislative measures which recognise the importance of trees woodlands and hedgerows and provide for their protection including the Forestry Act 1946 and Wildlife (Amendment) Act 2000. These prohibit trees from being cut down unless a notice of intention is given and prohibit the cutting of hedges within the bird nesting period. The main threats come mainly from invasive species, heavy grazing and damaging activities such as non-native planting, native felling and dumping. There are instances of felling (both legal and illegal) of ash trees for the production of hurleys.

There are around 180 significant trees in County Kilkenny included in the Tree Register of Ireland, compiled by the Tree Council of Ireland, based on characteristics such as age, height, diameter, historical or folklore connections. The tallest tree in Kilkenny is a silver fir of 5.39 × 43m located at Woodstock Gardens in Inistioge and the tree with the largest girth is a common lime of 9.01 × 27m located at Coolmore House in Thomastown. At present, under the Planning and Development Act 2000, there are 4 Tree Preservation Orders (TPO) in County Kilkenny for the protection of trees, groups of trees and woods of amenity value. These include Oldcourt in Inistioge, Keatingstown, Barna in Freshford, Sawney's Wood in Castlecomer and the Castle Gardens in Kilkenny City.

Important trees in county Kilkenny include two cedars of Lebanon at Kildalton Agricultural College in Piltown, a Monterey cypress, beech, silver fir and two coastal redwood at Woodstock Gardens in Inistioge. In Thomastown there is a common lime at Coolmore House, an English/common oak at Stoneen Kilfawe, an English/common oak at Mount Juilliet Estate and a Wellingtonia, giant sequoia, Monterey cypress, sweet/Spanish chestnut and a holm oak/evergreen oak at Kilfane Glebe. There is also a Turkey oak at Threecastles House in Kilkenny, an ash and two English/common oak at Ballytobin House in Callan, a common lime, Wellingtonia giant sequoia and two Monterey cypress at Shankill Castle in Paulstown, an English/common oak at Ballykeefe House in Kilmanagh, an English/common oak at Fanningstown House in Owning and a beech at Castlecomer Golf Club in Castlecomer.

==== Climate ====
Kilkenny

Climate chart (precipitation, max. and min. temperature)
J	F	M	A	M	J	J	A	S	O	N	D
87 8 2	66 9 2	63 11 3	52 12 4	62 16 7	51 18 9	53 21 12	71 20 11	73 18 9	86 14 6	74 11 4	88 9 2
- █ Average max. and min. temperatures in °C
- █ Precipitation totals in mm
Imperial conversion
J	F	M	A	M	J	J	A	S	O	N	D
3.4 47 35	2.6 48 35	2.5 51 38	2 54 40	2.4 61 44	2 65 49	2.1 69 53	2.8 68 52	2.9 64 48	3.4 57 44	2.9 51 39	3.5 48 36
- █ Average max. and min. temperatures in °F
- █ Precipitation totals in inches

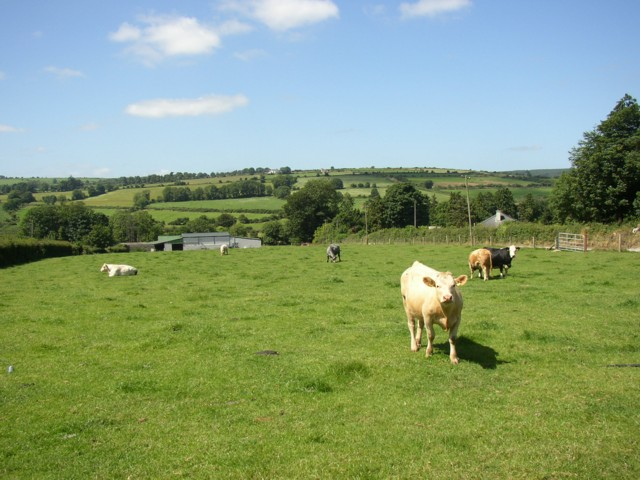
Pasture at Listerlin, County Kilkenny.

The climate of County Kilkenny, like the climate of Ireland, is a changeable oceanic climate with few extremes. It is defined as a temperate oceanic climate, or Cfb on the Köppen climate classification system. Kilkenny lies in plant Hardiness zone 9. Weatherwise, the county is generally representative of wide river valleys in the region with low temperatures on cloudless nights, and is significant in that it records some of the highest summer and lowest winter temperatures in Ireland. The highest air temperature ever recorded in Ireland was 33.3 °C (91.9 °F), at Kilkenny Castle on 26 June 1887.

The Met Éireann Kilkenny Weather Observing Station, 2 km north-west of Kilkenny City centre, on the Duningstown Road, opened in May 1957, and observations ceased in April 2008. A climatological station is currently in operation within 1 km of the old site, and as of March 2010, was providing live weather data to the general public and climate data to Met Éireann.

The maximum temperature recorded at the Met Station was 30.8 °C (87.4 °F) on 2 August 1995. Extremes recorded at the station include the highest air temperature of 31.5 °C (88.7 °F) on 29 June 1976, the lowest air temperature of −14.1 °C (6.6 °F) on 2 January 1979 and the lowest ground temperature of −18.1 °C (−0.6 °F) on 12 January 1982. The maximum daily sunshine was 16.3 hours on 18 June 1978. The warmest and sunniest month on record in Kilkenny was August 1995 with a total of 274.9 hours sunshine and very high temperatures throughout. The maximum daily sunshine was 16.3 hours on 18 June 1978. The overall trend in temperatures has been on the rise with a marked increase from 1988 onwards. Annual temperatures are running over 0.5 degrees above 20th-century levels.

The maximum daily rainfall recorded at Kilkenny station was 66.4 millimetres (2.61 in) on 17 July 1983. The late 1950s and early 1960s were wet but rainfall had been steady throughout the century. 2002 was a very wet year and since 2005 annual rainfall has been increased steadily, with 2009 being the wettest year since records commenced in 1958. At the centre of the county, Kilkenny is in a sheltered location, over 60 km inland and is surrounded by hills over 200m, which ensures that it is not a windy location. The highest wind gust of 77 knots, from a south-west direction, was recorded on 12 January 1974.

=== Geology ===
The geology of Kilkenny includes the Kiltorcan Formation which is early Carboniferous in age. The formation is located around Kiltorcan Hill near Ballyhale in the Callan and Knocktopher areas. It forms the uppermost part of the Old Red Sandstone and is the distinctive Upper Devonian–Lower Carboniferous unit in southern Ireland. It contains non-red lithologies, green mudstones, siltstones, fine sandstones and yellow sandstones. There is a fossil assemblage containing Cyclostigma and Archaeopteris and Archaeopteris hibernica.

Most of the county is principally limestone of the upper and lower group, corresponding with the rest of Ireland. A large area in the north and east contains beds of coal, surrounded by limestone strata, alternated with shale, argillaceous ironstone, and sandstone. This occurs eastward of the Nore around Castlecomer, along the border with Laois. It is generally accompanied by culm, which was used extensively for burning lime.

The natural environment and resources of County Kilkenny includes its rivers, wildlife (mammals, birds, plants), woodlands, hedgerows, and diverse landscapes and geological features. The main land use is grassland, dairy farming and tillage farming especially around Kilkenny City and in the fertile central plain of the Nore Valley. Conifer forests are found on the upland areas.

Habitats of international and national importance, are designated under European Union and national legislation. The four categories of designated site in effect in County Kilkenny are Special Areas of Conservation, Natural Heritage Areas, Statutory Nature Reserves and Wildfowl Sanctuaries. The 2008–2014 county development plan recorded 36 designated natural heritage sites of international and national importance in County Kilkenny, covering approximately 4.5% of the county.

==== Mountains and hills ====
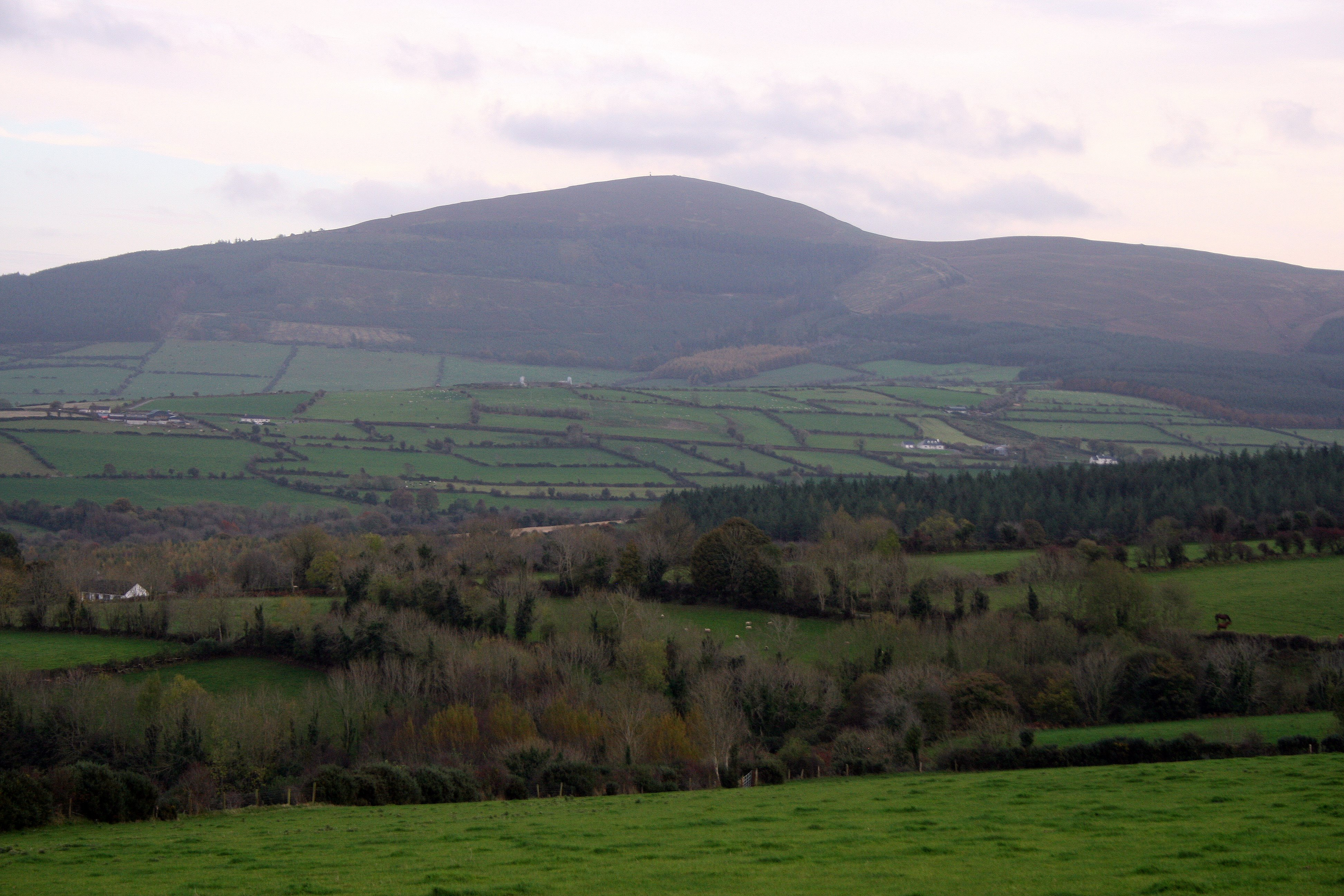
Brandon Hill

County Kilkenny is comparably low compared to other mountain ranges in Ireland with the highest peak being Brandon Hill (Irish: Cnoc Bhréanail), at 515 metres (1,690 ft) above sea level. The majority of rest of the county is hilly except for the centre of the county, just south of the city of Kilkenny, which is comparably lower than the rest of the county. There are highlands in the North-East, the North-West and in the South of the county.

In the north of the county the uplands of the Castlecomer district, the Castlecomer Plateau includes the Culla Hills to the west of the Nore Valley with Castlecomer Hills and Slieve Marcy to the east. These hills are divided by the valley of the Dinan river which joins the Nore from the east. The highest point of the Castlecomer Hills is 313 metres (1,027 ft), and located North-West of the town of Castlecomer and near the border with Laois. The highest point of the Culla Hills is in Laois at 279 metres (915 ft), but its undulating slopes spread over a considerable area of Kilkenny in the north-westerly area.

In the west of the county the Slieveardagh Hills and Booley Hills extend westwards to County Tipperary. The highest point in the Slieveardagh Hills is Knocknamuck at 340 metres (1,120 ft). The Booley Mountains partly divide from Tory Hill to the valley of the Kilmacow River which flows into the Suir.

In the south of the county is Brandon Hill, at 515 metres (1,690 ft) and is near the Barrow and Graiguenamanagh. The area enclosed between the rivers Nore and Barrow towards their point of joining is elevated. Along the west of the Barrow and Nore is mostly covered by hills of nearly equal elevation except along the left bank of the river Suir. Here there is a rich area of land between the river and the hills.

=== Baronies ===
The county is subdivided into twelve baronies which are in turn divided into civil parishes and townlands. There are about 800 townlands in Kilkenny. Each barony was made up of a number of parishes or parts of parishes. Both civil parishes and baronies are now largely obsolete (except for purposes such as legal transactions involving land) and are no longer used for local government purposes.

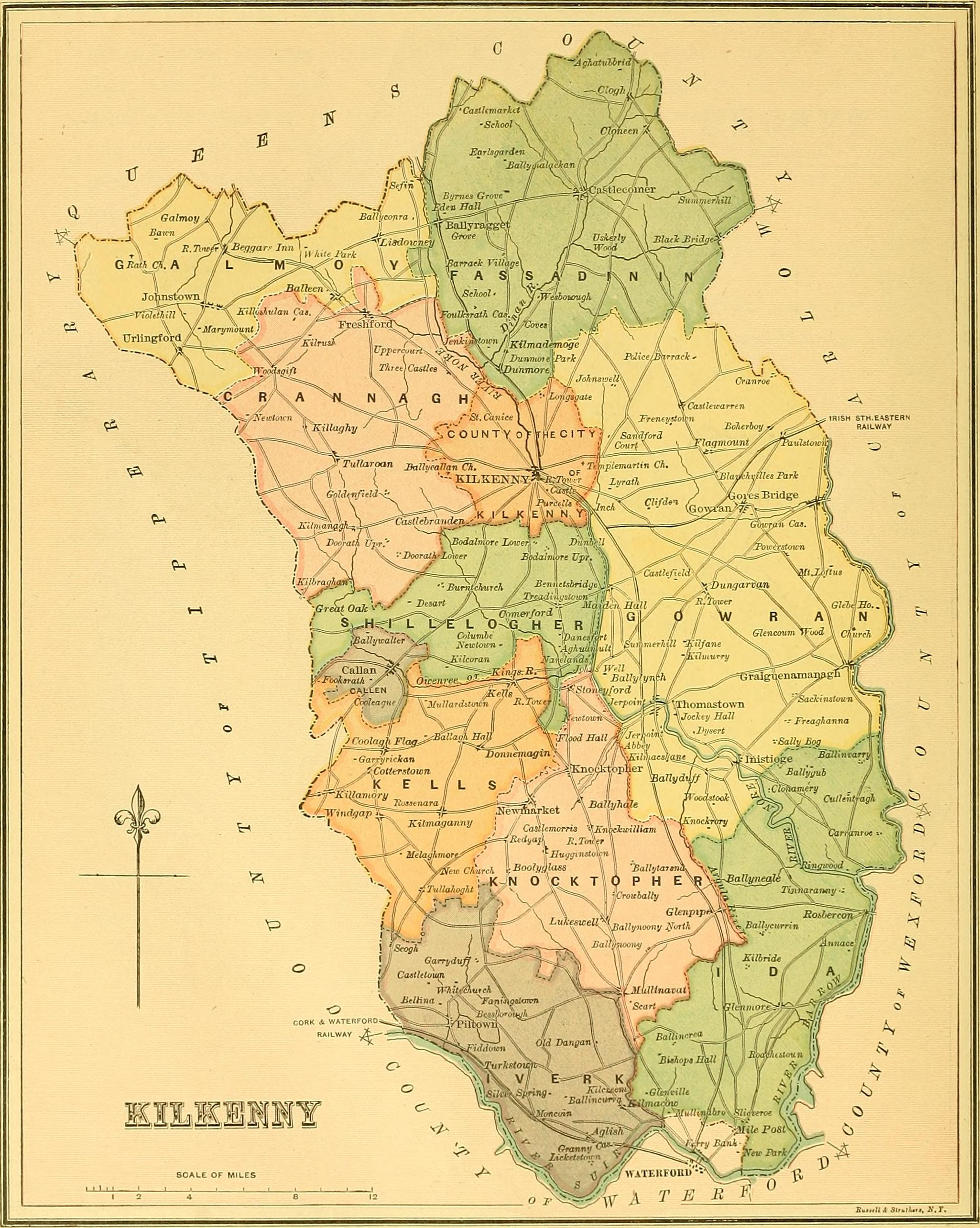
The Baronies of County Kilkenny

1. Callan (Callainn)
2. Cranagh (Crannach)
3. Fassadinin (Fásach an Deighnín)
4. Galmoy (Gabhalmhaigh)
5. Gowran (Gabhrán)
6. Ida (Uí Dheá)
7. Iverk (Uíbh Eirc)
8. Kells (Ceanannas)
9. Kilculliheen (Cill Choilchín)
10. Kilkenny (Cill Chainnigh)
11. Knocktopher (Cnoc an Tóchair)
12. Shillelogher (Síol Fhaolchair)

=== Civil parishes and townlands ===
For religious administration, the county was divided into parishes. Every parish had at least one church. The barony boundaries and the parish boundaries were not connected.

From the 17th to mid-19th centuries, civil parishes were based on early Christian and medieval monastic and church settlements. The civil parishes are divided into townlands (See List of townlands in County Kilkenny). As the population grew, new parishes were created and the civil parish covered the same area as the established Church of Ireland. The Roman Catholic Church adapted to a new structure based on towns and villages. There 2,508 civil parishes in Ireland, which often break both barony and county boundaries.

=== Towns and Villages ===
- Ballyhale
- Ballyragget
- Bennettsbridge
- Callan
- Carrigeen
- Castlecomer
- Castlewarren
- Clogh
- Coan
- Danesfort
- Dungarvan
- Dunnamaggan
- Ferrybank
- Freshford
- Galmoy
- Goresbridge
- Gowran
- Graiguenamanagh
- Glenmore
- Hugginstown
- Inistioge
- Jenkinstown
- Johnstown
- Johnswell
- Kilkenny
- Killinaspick
- Kilmacow
- Kilmoganny
- Knocktopher
- Kilmanagh
- Moneenroe
- Mooncoin
- Mullinavat
- Paulstown
- Piltown
- Rosbercon
- Slieverue
- Stoneyford
- Thomastown
- Tullaroan
- The Rower
- Urlingford
- Windgap

=== European region ===
For statistical purposes at European level, the county is part of the South-East Region, a NUTS III entity; this is in turn part of the level II NUTS entity, Southern Region.

== Governance and politics ==
=== Local government ===
The island of Ireland, showing location of County Kilkenny.

Local government in County Kilkenny is governed by the Local Government Acts. The Local Government Reform Act 2014 established a unitary structure of local government. This single-tier structure consists of Kilkenny County Council.

For the purposes of local government, Kilkenny is divided into 4 local electoral areas – Callan–Thomastown (6), Castlecomer (6), Kilkenny city (7) and Piltown (5) – which return a total of 24 members to Kilkenny County Council. The 2019 Kilkenny local elections had a voter turnout of 53%, a decrease of 4.1% on the 2014 election. The highest turnout was in Callan–Thomastown (56.4%) and the lowest was in Kilkenny city (50.4%).

In the 2019 local elections, Fianna Fáil and Fine Gael emerged as the two dominant parties, holding 20 of the 24 seats between them. The Labour Party hold 2 seats, the Green Party hold 1 seat, and there is 1 independent. Sinn Féin, which had held 3 seats, failed to gain a seat in the 2019 election. Council elections are held every 5 years, with the next election due to be held in May 2024.

Party	Seats	% of votes	% Change since 2014	Seat Change since 2014
Fianna Fáil	11	41.1%	▲3.9%	▲1
Fine Gael	9	32.1%	▲2.2%	▲2
Labour	2	7.5%	▼3.7%	Steady
Green	1	3.8%	▲0.3%	Steady
Sinn Féin	0	6.4%	▼3.5%	▼3
Independent	1	8.5%	▲1.3%	Steady

As the county is part of the South-East Region, some county councillors are also representatives on the Southern Regional Assembly.

=== Former districts ===
Until 2014, the second tier of local government consisted of Kilkenny Borough Council which was a town council. The city of Kilkenny was allowed to use the title of "Borough Council" instead of "Town Council", but Kilkenny Borough Council had no additional responsibilities. Since the enactment of the aforementioned Act on 1 June 2014, which abolished the borough, the county council is solely responsible for local services.

=== National politics ===
The county is part of the Dáil constituency of Carlow–Kilkenny (5 TDs). The constituency has been in use since the 1948 general election.

Kilkenny has been represented through several parliamentary constituencies in the past. From 1918 to 1921, County Kilkenny was divided between the United Kingdom parliamentary constituencies of North Kilkenny and South Kilkenny. In 1921 the Carlow–Kilkenny Dáil constituency was created and continued until the creation of a separate Kilkenny constituency in 1937, which existed until 1948.

The county is part of the South constituency for elections to the European Parliament. The constituency has 5 seats.

== History ==
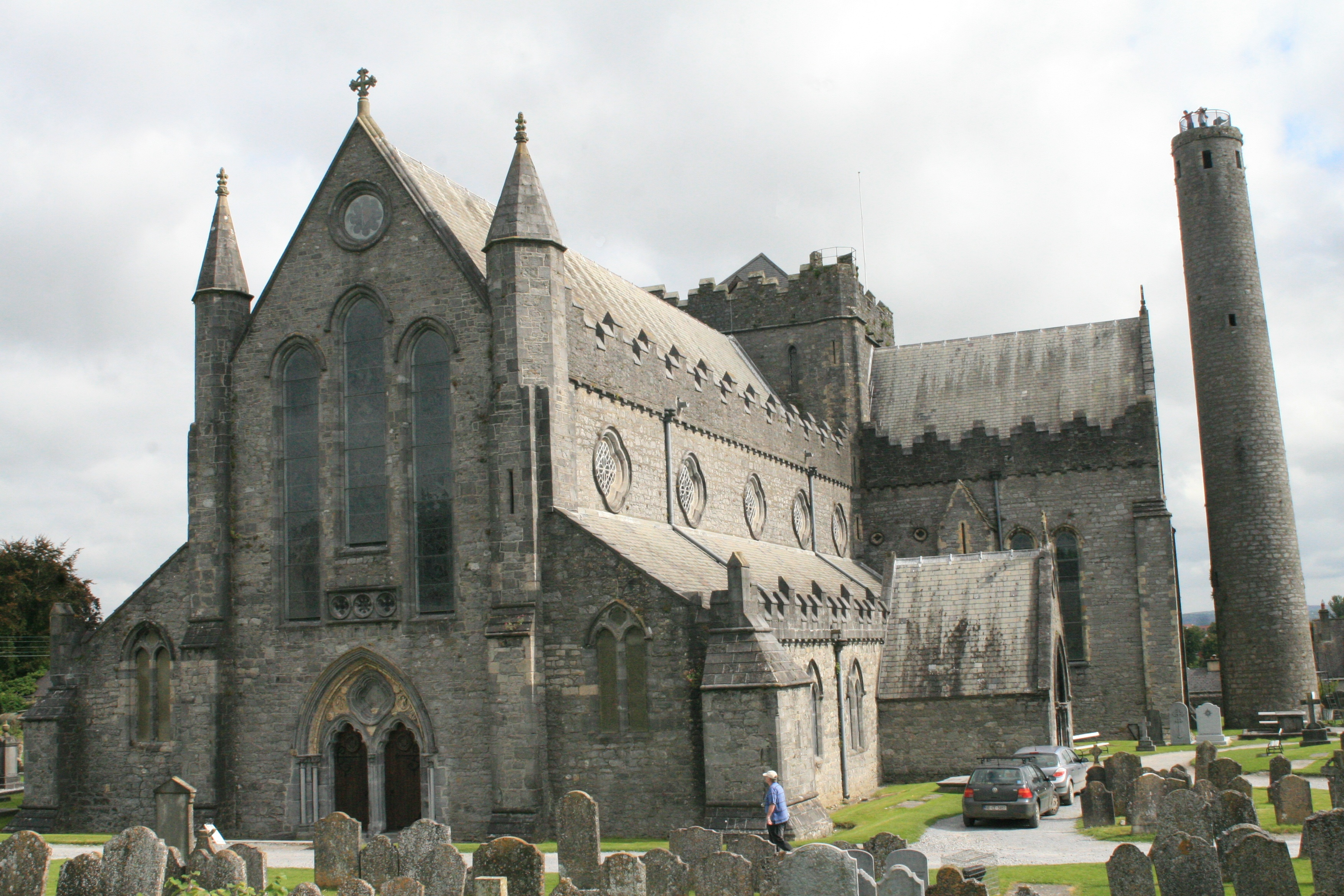
St Canice's Cathedral and round tower around which Kilkenny developed

County Kilkenny takes its name from the city of Kilkenny. Kilkenny is the anglicised version of the Irish Cill Chainnigh, meaning Church (Cell) of Cainneach or Canice. This probably relates to the church and round tower, now St. Canice's Cathedral, which was built in honour of St. Canice.

The Kingdom of Osraige was one of the ancient Kingdoms of Ireland. The Kings of Osraige, the Mac Giolla Phádraig family, reigned over Osraige and Cill Chainnigh was their stronghold. The Kingdom of Ossory existed from at least the 2nd century until the 13th century AD. The current ecclesiastical dioceses of that area is still known as Ossory. The medieval Diocese of Ossory and was established in 549 AD, and its territory corresponded to the medieval Kingdom of Ossory. In historic times, Kilkenny replaced Aghaboe as the chief church in Osraige.

The kingdom was bounded by two of the Three Sisters the rivers Barrow and Suir and the northern limit was, generally, the Slieve Bloom Mountains. The Osraige —their name means people of the deer— inhabited much of modern County Kilkenny and parts of neighbouring County Laois. To the west and south, Osraige was bounded by the River Suir, to the east the watershed of the River Barrow marked the boundary with Leinster, and to the north it extended into and beyond the Slieve Bloom Mountains. The River Nore ran through the Kingdom.

Osraige formed the easternmost part of the kingdom and province of Munster until the middle of the 9th century, after which it was attached to Leinster. Osraige was largely a buffer state between Leinster and Munster. Its most significant neighbours were the Loígsi, Uí Cheinnselaig and Uí Baircche of Leinster to the north and east and the Déisi Muman, Eóganacht Chaisil and Éile of Munster to the south and west.

The name Osraige is said to be from the Usdaie, a Celtic tribe that Ptolemy's map of Ireland places in roughly the same area that Osraige would later occupy. The territory indicated by Ptolemy probably included the major late Iron Age hill-fort at Freestone Hill which produced some Roman finds. Also the interesting burial at Stoneyford which is of typical Roman type and probably dates to the 1st century AD. The Osraighe themselves claimed to be descended from the Érainn people. Others propose that the Ivernic groups included the Osraige of the Kingdom of Osraige/Ossory. The Brigantes were the only Celtic tribe to have a presence in both England and Ireland, in the latter of which they could be found around Kilkenny, Wexford and Waterford.

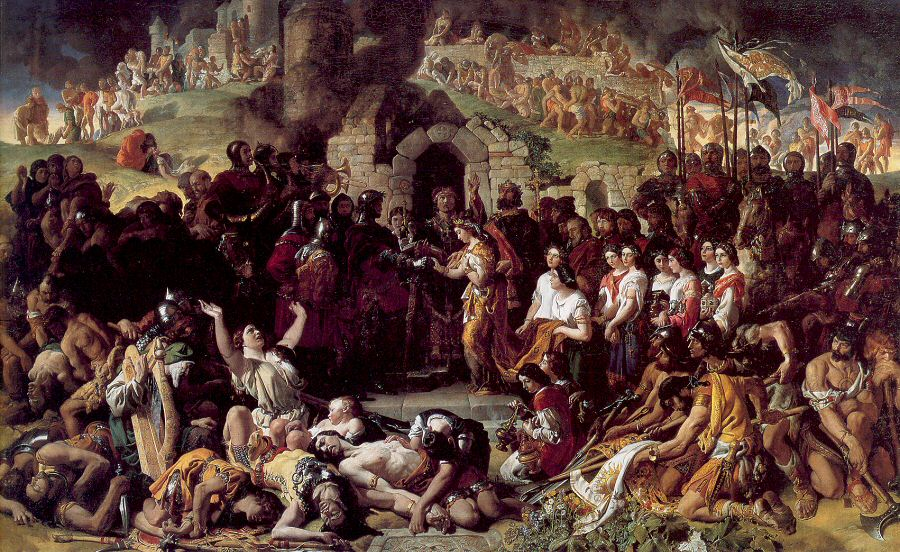
The Marriage of Aoife and Strongbow (1854) by Daniel Maclise, a romanticised depiction of the union between the Aoife MacMurrough and Strongbow in the ruins of Waterford.

Pope Adrian IV gave Norman King Henry II of England permission to claim Ireland 1154. The Cisternians came to Jerpoint and Kilkenny around 1155/60. Jerpoint Abbey is founded by Donal MacGiollaPhadruig, King of Ossory 1158. In 1168, Dermot MacMurrough the King of Leinster was driven out of his kingdom by Rory O'Connor the High King of Ireland with the help of Tiernan O'Rourke. MacMurrough looked for help from Henry II and got help from a Cambro-Norman lord notable Richard de Clare, 2nd Earl of Pembroke, known to history as Strongbow. MacMurrough secured the services of Richard, promising him the hand of his daughter Aoife of Leinster and the succession to Leinster. Richard and other Marcher barons and knights by King Henry assembled an army. The army, under Raymond le Gros, took Wexford, Waterford and Dublin in 1169 and 1170, and Strongbow joined them in August 1170. The day after the capture of Waterford, he married MacMorrough's daughter, Aoife.

The Lordship of Ireland was a lordship created in the wake of the Norman invasion of Ireland in 1169–71. Kilkenny formed part of the lordship of Leinster. Strongbow became Lord of Leinster in 1171.

== Places of interest ==
=== Architecture ===
The architecture of County Kilkenny contains features from all eras since the Stone Age including Norman and Anglo-Irish castles, Georgian urban buildings, towns and villages with unique architectures, palladian and rococo country houses, Gothic and neo-Gothic cathedrals and buildings. In the late 20th century a new economic climate resulted in a renaissance of culture and design, with some at the cutting edge of modern architecture. County Kilkenny contains varied architecture including passage graves, ringforts, Irish round towers, castles, churches and cathedrals, abbeys and priories, bridges and roads, and townhouses of varying style.

==== Early architecture ====
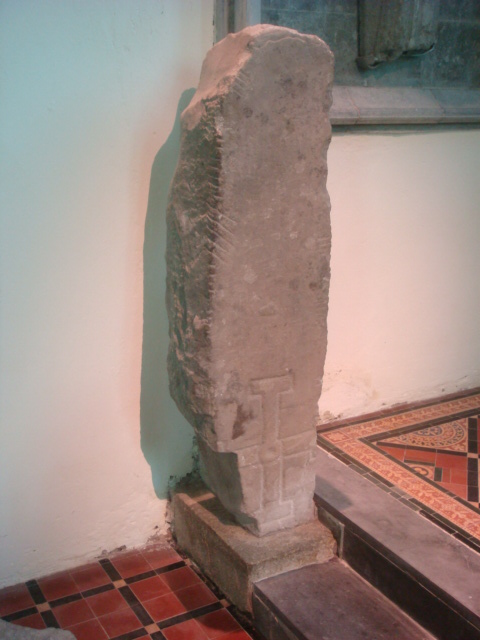
The Gowran Ogham Stone. Christianised c. the 6th century. On display in St. Mary's Collegiate Church Gowran

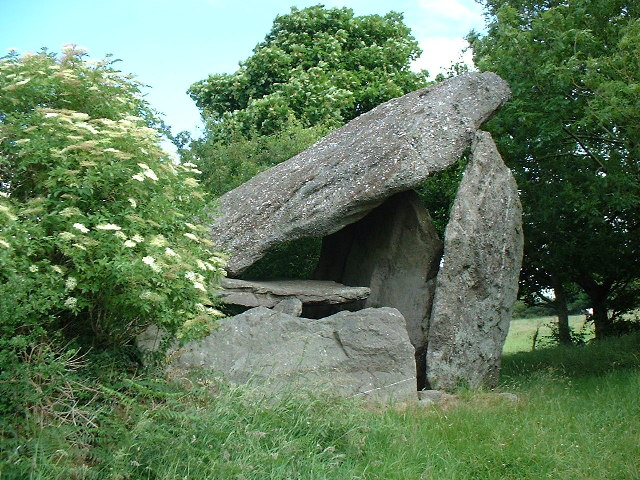
Leac an Scail, Kilmogue Portal Dolmen

Evidence of Neolithic settlement can be found throughout the county. There are great burial mounds including the portal tombs and dolmens at Owning, Kilmogue-Harristown and Borrismore. There are passage graves at Clomantagh Hill and Knockroe. There were non-megalith single-grave burial tombs, Linkardstown-type Cists, excavated at Jerpoint West. These are late Neolithic and before the single-grave rite of the Bronze Age. A Neolithic house was identified in Granny near Waterford, making it the oldest house in County Kilkenny. The square house consisted of slot-trenches, internal floor surfaces, a hearth and wooden posts at each corner, one of the post-holes was radiocarbon-dated to 3997–3728 BC. A new form of early Neolithic pottery with a lip around the inside of the rim were found. This Granny pottery is similar to pottery found in the south-east of England.

Ogham stones are found throughout County Kilkenny. The Gowran Ogham Stone which is on display in St. Mary's Collegiate Church Gowran is an example of a Christianised ogham stone. The ogham lettering is from the 3rd or 4th century. The Christian cross was carved c. 6th century following St. Patrick's arrival in Ireland in 432 AD. The ogham stone was found on the site during the rebuilding of the chancel in 1826. The Gowran Ogham Stone has survived to the present day due to the fact that it was used as a building stone in another part of the church and lay undisturbed for centuries.

Passage graves consisted of a central burial chamber, with a long passageway to the entrance. Knockroe contains a passage tomb which is protected by listing order. From some time beginning around the Iron Age, Ireland has thousands of ringforts, or "raths". Carigeen, Danesfort, Dunbell big and Tullaroan all contain ring forts protected by preservation order.

The round stone tower is one feature of early historic architecture not usually found outside Ireland with only three in Scotland and one on the Isle of Man. The tower at St Canice's Cathedral in Kilkenny City is a good example. Other round towers are situated around the county such as Tullaherin round tower, one near Bennettsbridge, Kells, Johnstown, and Aghaviller near Knocktopher.

==== Castles ====
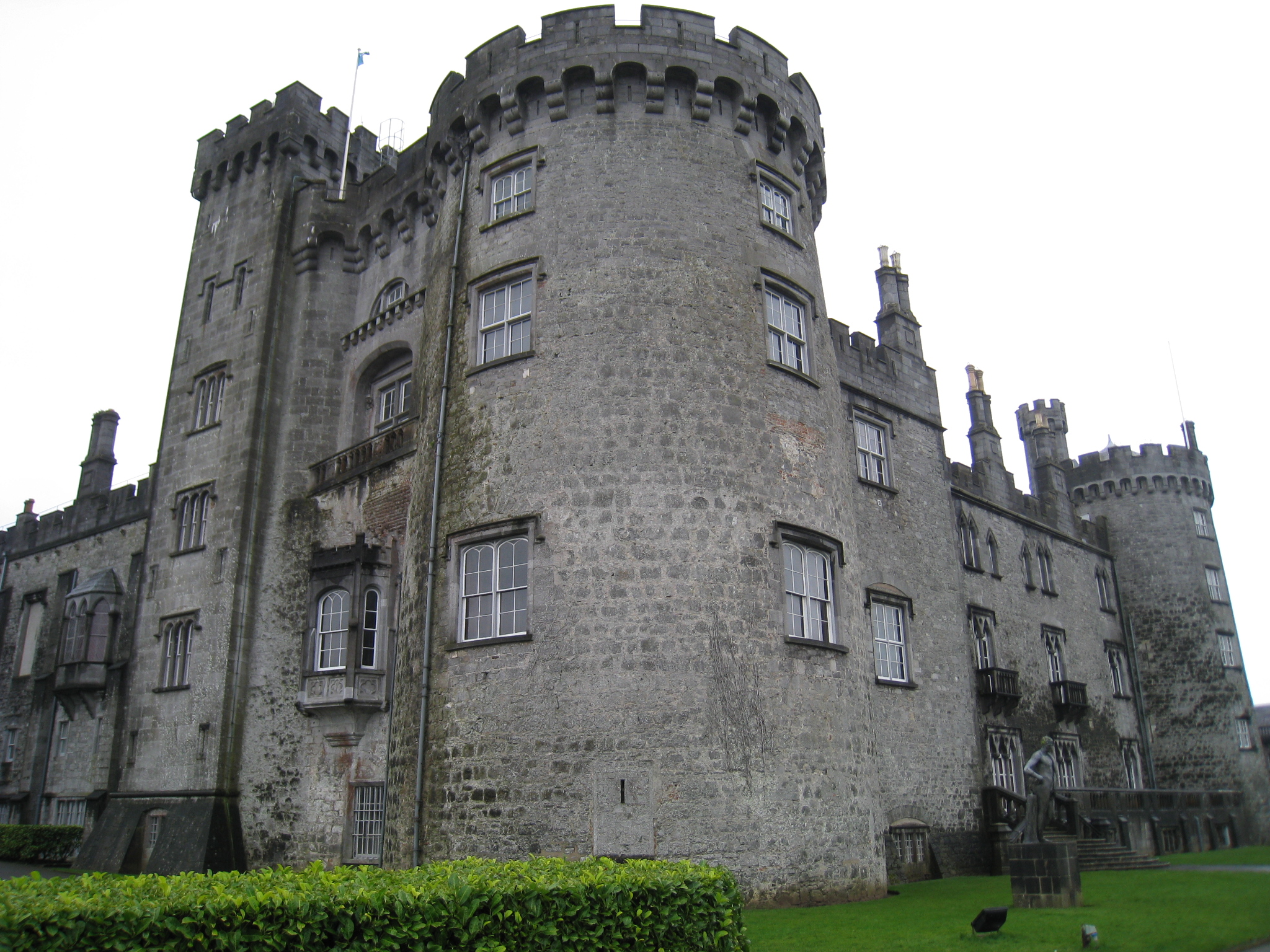
Kilkenny Castle

Kilkenny Castle is a castle in Kilkenny. It was the seat of the Butler family. Formerly the family name was FitzWalter. The castle was sold to the local Castle Restoration Committee in the middle of the 20th century for £50. Shortly afterwards it was handed over to the State, and has since been refurbished and is open to visitors. Part of the National Art Gallery is on display in the castle. There are ornamental gardens on the town side of the castle, and extensive land and gardens to the front. It has become one of the most visited tourist sites in Ireland.

Foulksrath Castle is a 15th-century Anglo-Norman tower house located in Jenkinstown in County Kilkenny. It was built by the Purcell clan, who also constructed several others nearby. After over three centuries as owners, the family was reduced to living as peasants in the castle stables after it was confiscated by Oliver Cromwell and given to his officers after the Cromwellian conquest of Ireland.

==== Abbeys and priories ====
Jerpoint Abbey is a Cistercian abbey near Thomastown. It was constructed in 1180, probably on the site of an earlier Benedictine monastery built in 1160 by Domnall Mac Gilla Patraic, King of Osraige. Jerpoint is notable for its stone carvings, including one at the tomb of Felix Ua Duib Sláin, Bishop of the Diocese of Ossory when the abbey was founded.

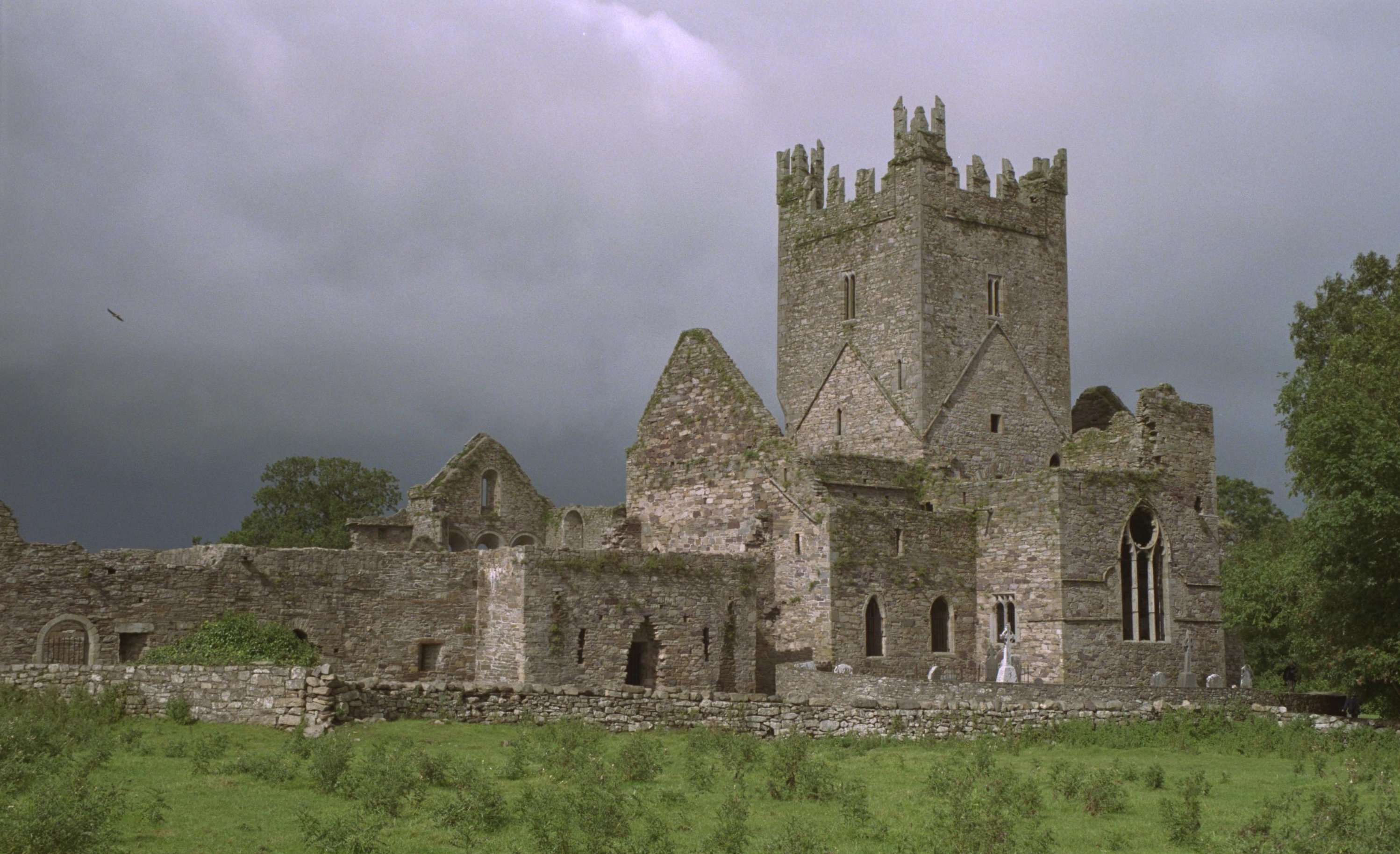
East front of Jerpoint Abbey

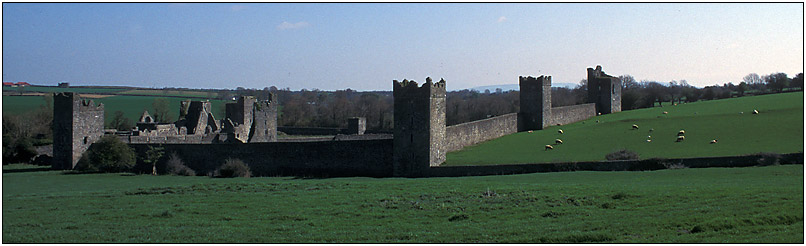
Kells Priory in Kells

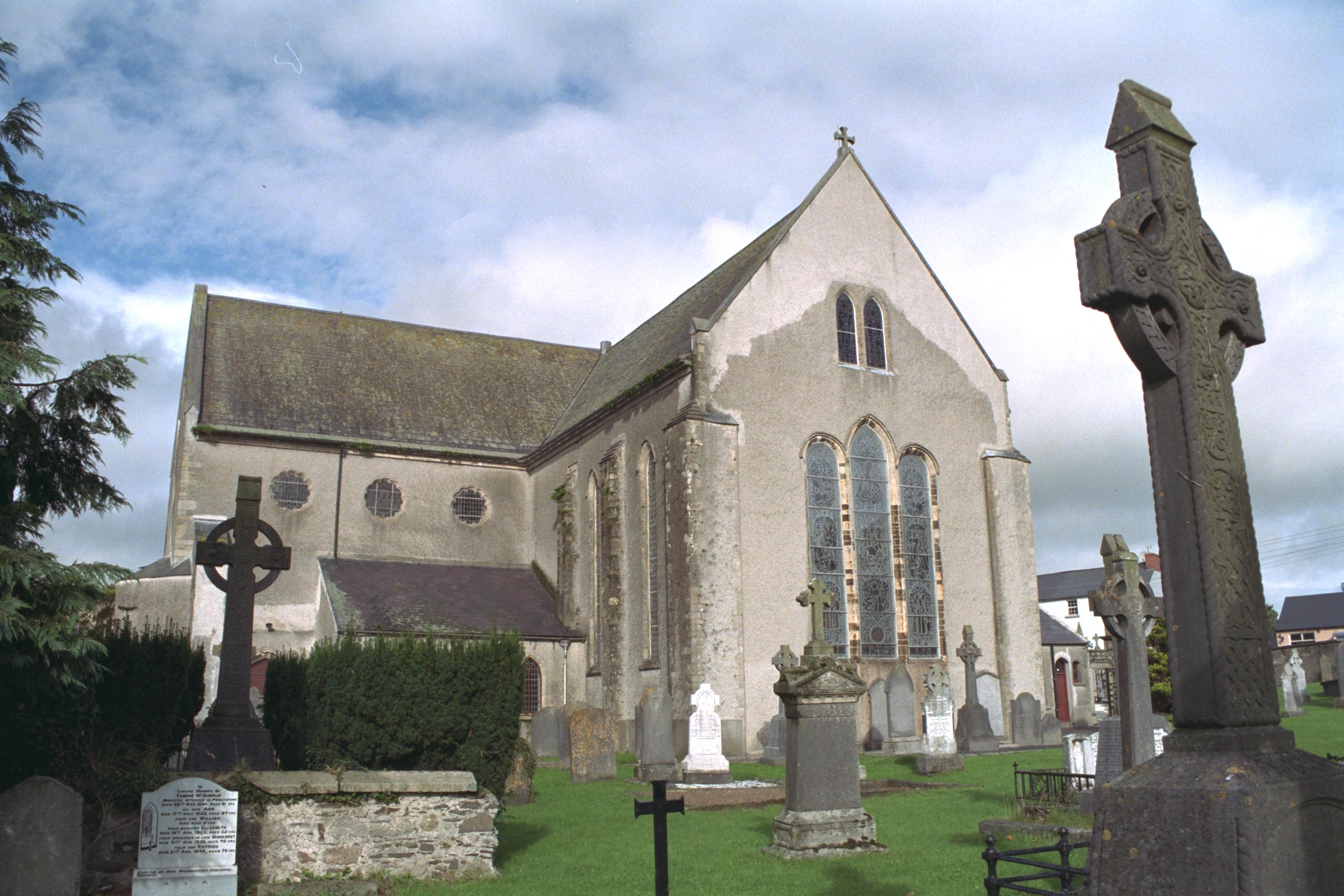
Duiske Abbey in Graiguenamanagh

Duiske Abbey in Graiguenamanagh founded in 1204 was one of the first and largest Cistercians monasteries in Ireland. What remains of the monastery is a large gothic church which dominates the town centre in Graiguenamanagh. The abbey derives its name from the river Duiske or Dúbh Uisce which flows through the town on its way to the river Barrow which also flows through this town. Original floor tiles from the original building can be seen in the abbey along with the gothic and romanesque architecture.

The Black Abbey in Kilkenny, founded 1225, is a Dominican abbey with two-bay double-height lean-to lower aisle to south. It was extended, c. 1325, with four-bay double-height transept to south having four-bay double-height lean-to lower aisle to west.

Kells Priory is one of the largest medieval historic monuments in Ireland. It is a national monument and is in the guardianship of the Commissioners of Public Works. The priory is scenically situated alongside King's River, about fifteen kilometres south of Kilkenny. One of its most striking feature is a collection of medieval tower houses spaced at intervals along and within walls which enclose a site of just over 3 acres (12,000 m^{2}). These give the priory the appearance more of a fortress than of a place of worship and from them comes its local name of "Seven Castles".

The Callan Augustinian Friary is situated in Callan. It is known locally as the "Abbey Meadow" and is located at the North East of the town on the banks of the Kings Rover. Edmund Butler of Pottlerath, a noted patron of literature, successfully petitioned Pope Pius II for the foundation of the friary in 1461. After Edmund died in 1462, the actual buildings were erected by his son, James, probably after 1467 when he received a papal dispensation to marry his concubine, to whom he was related.

==== 18th-century bridges ====
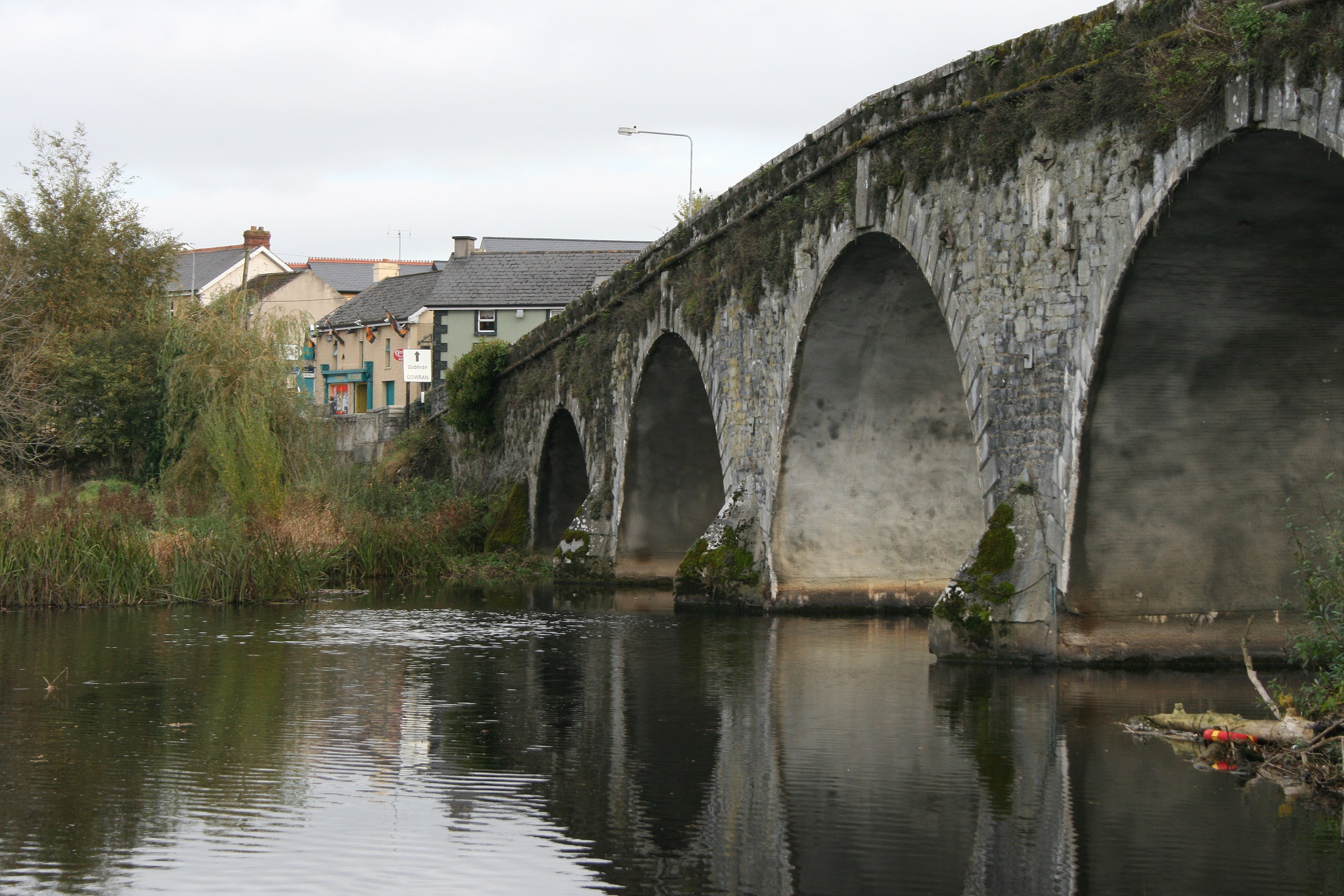
Bennett's bridge in Bennettsbridge over the River Nore

There are many 18th-century bridges in County Kilkenny. These bridges are an important element of the civil engineering and transport heritage of County Kilkenny and so are included in the National Inventory of Architectural Heritage (NIAH) Building Survey.

The Great Flood of 1763 washed away many of the major bridges crossing the River Nore, and a comprehensive rebuilding programme was initiated. Many of the bridges are built to designs prepared by George Smith (1763–67), a pupil of George Semple, and they feature Classical-style detailing, indicating the lasting influence of the illustrations included in Andrea Palladio's I quattro libri dell'architettura (1570). Smith designed Green's Bridge in Kilkenny, Castlecomer Bridge on the Dinin (Deen) River; Thomastown Bridge on the River Nore; Graiguenamanagh Bridge on the River Barrow and Inistioge Bridge on the River Nore.

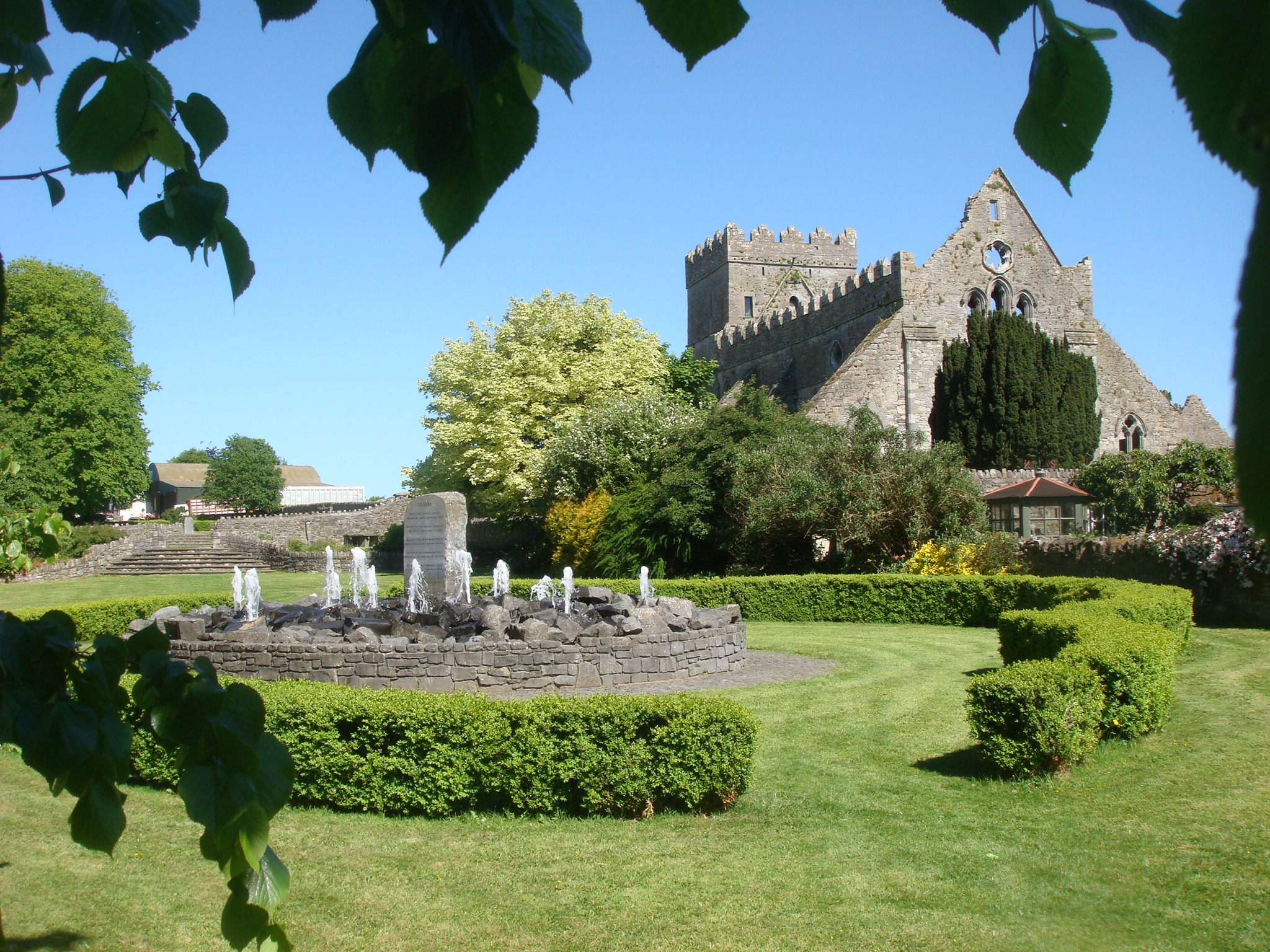
St. Mary's Collegiate Church Gowran

Other 18th-century bridges include; the bridges in Goresbridge, Bennettsbridge, Kells, Threecastles, Dinin Bridge and the bridge at Mount Juliet.

==== Churches ====
In medieval times many fine churches in Ireland were also built such as St. Mary's Collegiate Church Gowran, St. Canice's Cathedral in Kilkenny and St. Mary's Cathedral.

St. Lachtain's Church, Freshford was built in 1731, incorporating a portal from 1100 as its main entrance, all that is left of the original church is the Hiberno-Romanesque (Irish-Roman) architectural porch and doorway. The remainder of the present church was built for Protestant worship in 1731. In St. Lachtains time Freshford was a diocese. In 1225 a bishops palace was built at Aghore (Achadh Ur), now Uppercourt. It was used as a summer residence for over 300 years.

=== Tourist attractions ===
In County Kilkenny Jerpoint Abbey near Thomastown, Kells Priory at Kells. Kilkenny City including St Canice's Cathedral and St Mary's Cathedral, Rothe House and Kilkenny Castle.

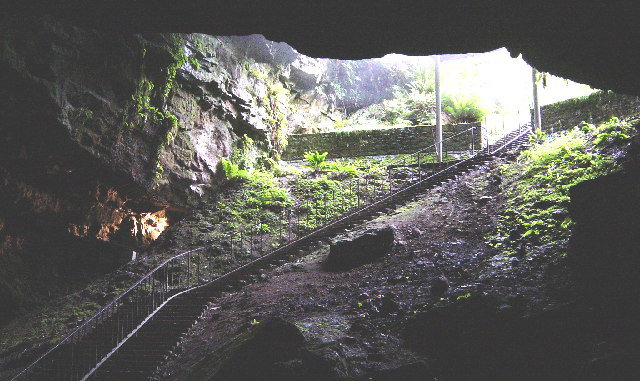
Dunmore Cave

Dunmore Cave is a show cave in Ballyfoyle, with a tourist centre established at the site. As well as a variety of cave formations, it is also one of the most documented archaeological sites in Ireland. Jenkinstown Park is about 10 kilometres (6.2 mi) north of the town of Kilkenny and 11 kilometres (6.8 mi) south of Castlecomer off the N78 road.

==== Gardens and Trails ====
Gardens include Kilfane Glen in Thomastown, Woodstock Garden in Inistioge, the Discover Park in Castlecomer, Darver House garden in Jenkinstown, Coolcashin Garden near Johnstown, Emoclew Garden in Goresbridge, Shankill Gardens & Castle in Paulstown, Rothe Family Garden in Kilkenny, Dahlia garden in The Rower and the rose garden at Kilkenny Castle. Hedgerows also have historical significance as townland and field boundaries.

The Nore Valley Way is a long-distance trail under development. When completed it will begin in Kilkenny City and end in Inistioge. It is designated as a National Waymarked Trail by the National Trails Office of the Irish Sports Council and is managed by Trail Kilkenny, a group made up of representatives of Kilkenny County Council, County Kilkenny LEADER Partnership, Kilkenny Sports Partnership and local landowners. The scenic South Leinster Way, a very scenic trail, journeys along the lower Barrow Valley before leaving the riverside at Graiguenamanagh to traverse the lower slopes of Brandon Hill.

== Demographics ==
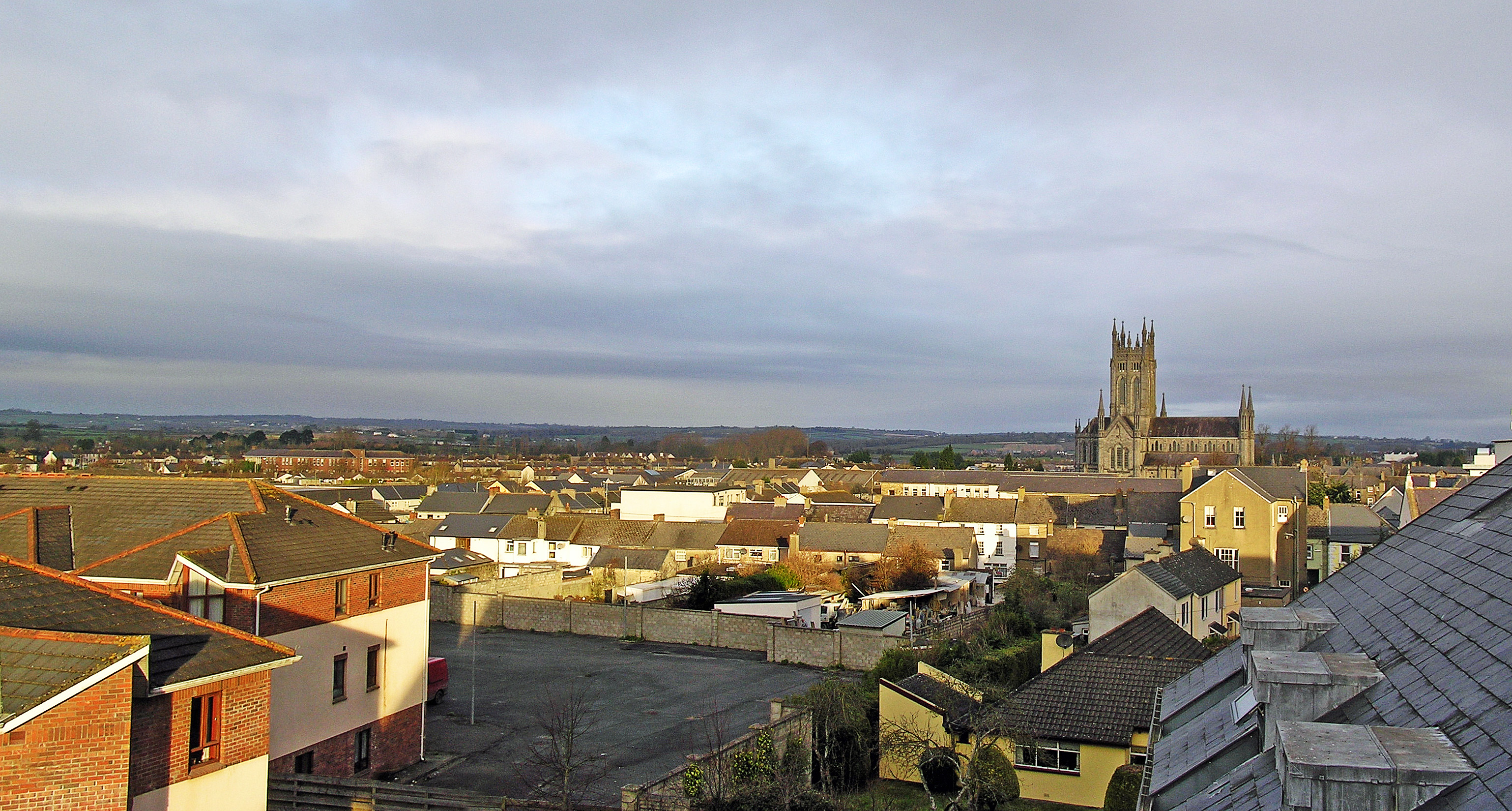
Kilkenny City

Historical population
Year	Pop.	±%
1600	11,343	—
1610	15,668	+38.1%
1653	19,185	+22.4%
1659	18,427	−4.0%
1821	181,946	+887.4%
1831	193,686	+6.5%
1841	202,420	+4.5%
1851	158,748	−21.6%
1861	124,515	−21.6%
1871	109,379	−12.2%
1881	99,531	−9.0%
1891	87,261	−12.3%
1901	79,159	−9.3%
1911	74,962	−5.3%
1926	70,990	−5.3%
1936	68,614	−3.3%
1946	66,712	−2.8%
1951	65,235	−2.2%
1956	64,089	−1.8%
1961	61,668	−3.8%
1966	60,463	−2.0%
1971	61,473	+1.7%
1979	69,156	+12.5%
1981	70,806	+2.4%
1986	73,186	+3.4%
1991	73,635	+0.6%
1996	75,336	+2.3%
2002	80,339	+6.6%
2006	87,558	+9.0%
2011	95,419	+9.0%
2016	99,232	+4.0%
2022	103,685	+4.5%

As of the 2016 census, by the Central Statistics Office, County Kilkenny's population was 99,232, of whom 38,722 people reported some level of Irish language usage. There were 41,363 people reported as at work in the county in 2016. There were 1,251 births and 546 deaths in 2007. Disposable household income per person as of 2005 was 18,032 euros and the index of disposable household was 89.4.

The main religion is Catholic, however there are Church of Ireland, Presbyterian, Methodist, Jewish and other religious traditions living in Kilkenny.

=== Irish language ===
County Kilkenny was the last county in Leinster to have native Irish speakers other than Louth (which was historically and linguistically a part of Ulster). The dialect shared the majority of its features with the surviving dialect of Ring in County Waterford. One distinct feature of the traditional Irish of Kilkenny (and Laois) as part of the Ossory dialect region was the pronunciation of slender R [ɾʲ] as [ʒʲ] similar to but not exactly like the G in the English word "regime". This [ʒʲ] sound was devoiced to an "sh" sound when slender R was adjacent to the sound /h/. The Irish language scholar Risteárd A. Breatnach wrote an MA thesis entitled "Kilkenny Irish" but this remains unpublished.

Baile Shéamais, in Glenmore, was home to Pádraig Paor who is believed to have been the last traditional native speaker of the Irish language in County Kilkenny. Audio-recordings were made of his speech in 1936 for the Irish Folklore Commission (Coimisiún Béaloideasa Éireann) by Séamus Ó Duilearga and Risteárd A Breatnach. His speech contains the well-documented Ossory pronunciation of slender R [ɾʲ] as [ʒʲ], resembling the ⟨j⟩ sound of Standard French.

== Economy ==
=== Cooperatives ===
In 1966, County Kilkenny village creameries amalgamated to create Avonmore Creameries, becoming Avonmore Food plc in 1988. The company joined with Waterford Food plc in 1997 to form Glanbia plc, a large multinational nutrition company with 2019 revenues of over €2.3 billion and 6,900 employees. The local operations have returned to co-operative control under the Tirlán brand in 2022.

== Infrastructure ==
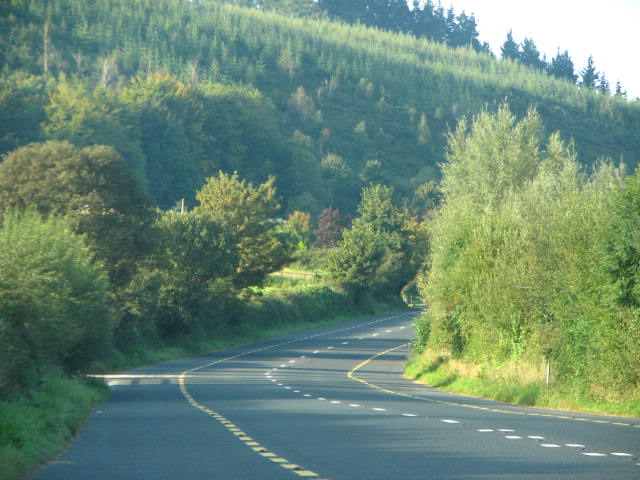
The N76 near Windgap

=== Transport ===
Iarnród Éireann (Irish Rail) provides rail services from Dublin to Waterford which pass through Kilkenny MacDonagh Station in Kilkenny and Thomastown railway station. Waterford railway station is located just outside County Kilkenny. The stations served are Dublin Heuston, Newbridge, Kildare, Athy, Carlow, Muine Bheag (Bagenalstown), Kilkenny, Thomastown, Waterford Plunkett. Since Kilkenny is a stub station, reversal is necessary. Non Passenger trains such as the DFDS Freight train from Ballina – Waterford avoid Kilkenny by using Lavistown loop which joins both lines going into Kilkenny. All direct services are operated by 22000 railcars. There is a service every 2 hours.

Bus Éireann and JJ Kavanagh and Sons provide bus services throughout the county.

Kilkenny Airport is a small airport located just 1.5 km West of Kilkenny. There are 6 powered resident aircraft and two gliders based at the aerodrome.

=== Hospitals ===
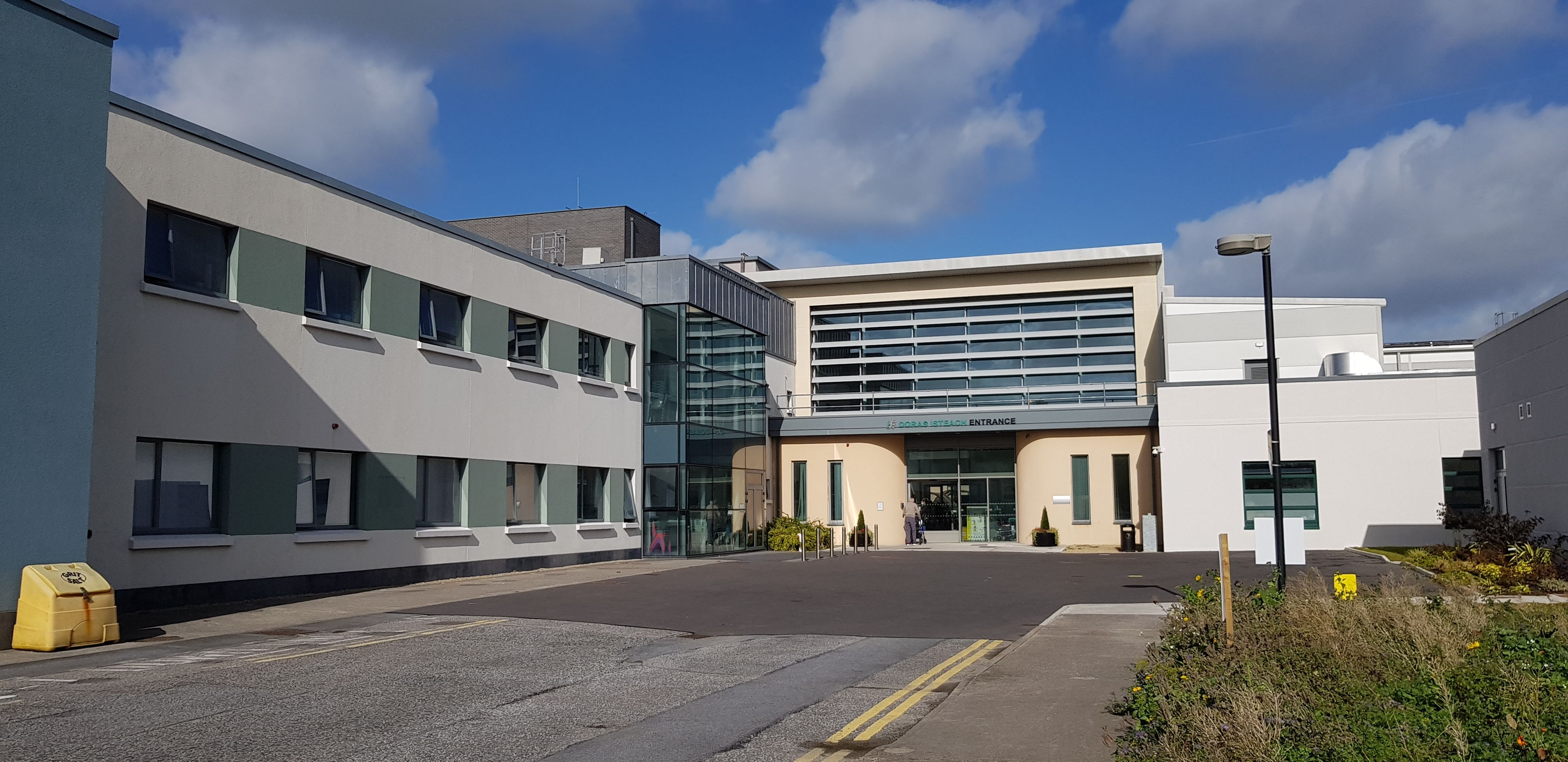
St. Luke's General Hospital, Kilkenny city

Hospitals in County Kilkenny include three public and one private hospitals. St. Luke's General Hospital is a general medical and surgical hospital built in 1942. It is situated on the Freshford Road and provides a range of local and regional services, including general medicine, general surgery, obstetrics, gynaecology and paediatrics. St. Canice's is a psychiatric hospital, opened in 1852 and located on the Dublin Road. It provides a range of mental health services including acute and long stay care, out-patient services throughout the county including addiction counselling services, respite care community hostel facilities and day care facilities. Kilcreene is the regional orthopaedic hospital based outside Kilkenny in Kilcreene. Aut Even is a private hospital based outside the city of Kilkenny. In Castlecomer there is Castlecomer District Hospital.

Most maternity services for County Kilkenny are proved in Waterford at University Hospital Waterford.

There are also health centres based around County Kilkenny including in Ballyhale, Ballyragget, Bennettsbridge, Callan, Castlecomer, Clogh, Castlecomer, Freshford, Gowran, Graiguenamanagh, Marley and Tinnahinch in Graiguenamanagh, Inistioge, Johnstown, Loughboy in Kilkenny, Stoneyford, Kilmacow, Mullinavat, Paulstown, Rosbercon, Thomastown, Urlingford and Windgap.

== Sport ==
=== GAA ===
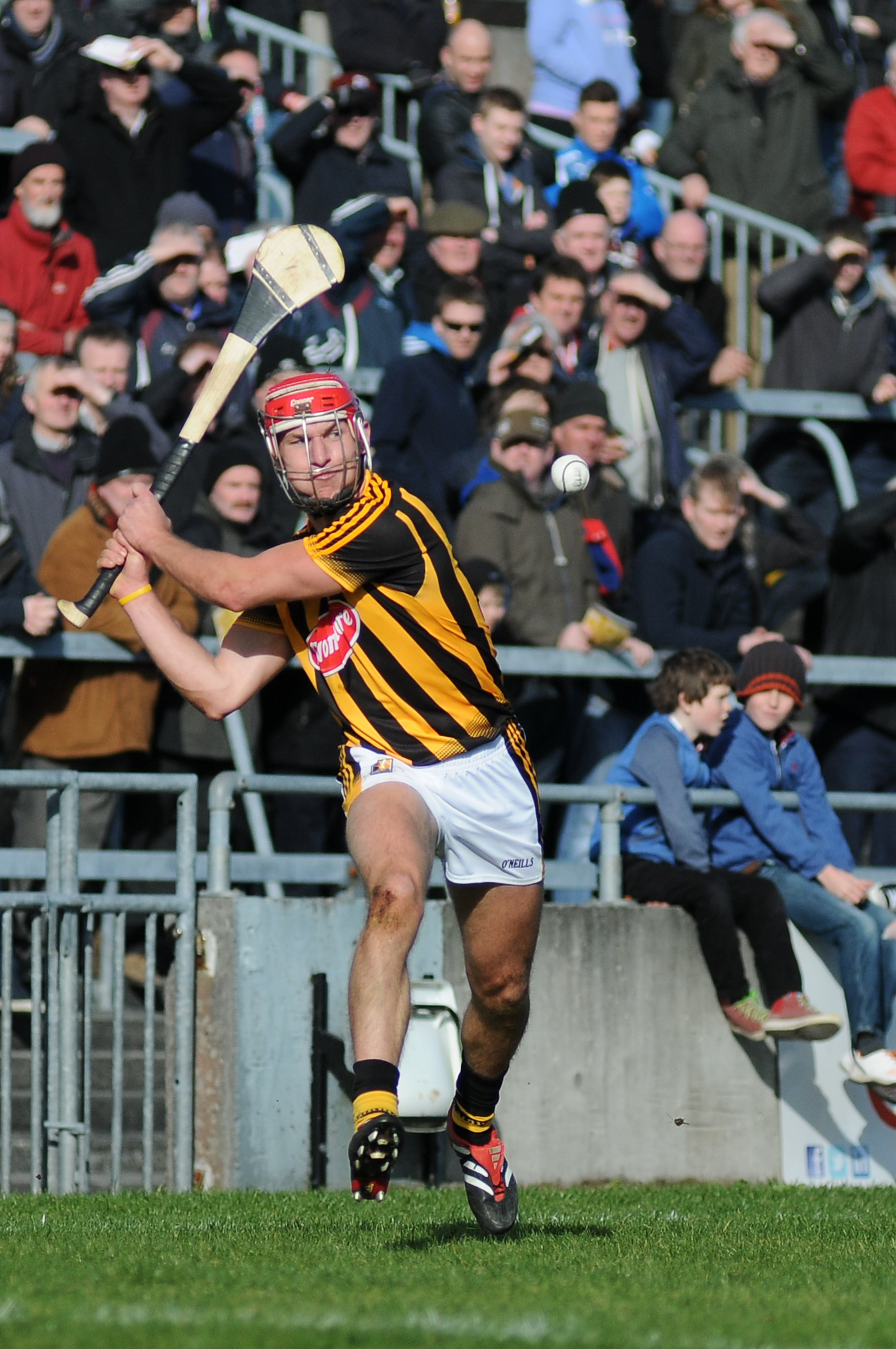
In hurling, Kilkenny are the most successful county, with 36 All-Ireland titles

In hurling, by far the dominant sport in the county, Kilkenny GAA compete annually in the All-Ireland Senior Hurling Championship, which they have won a record thirty-six times, the Leinster Senior Hurling Championship, which they have won seventy-seven times, and the National Hurling League, which they have won nineteen times. Kilkenny, along with Cork and Tipperary, are regarded as 'the Big Three' in the world of hurling.

The Kilkenny flag or county colours are black and amber. The County Kilkenny hurling team, Tullaroan, were the first Kilkenny team to wear the famous black and amber colours. In 1886, after winning the first-ever county championship in Kilkenny they held a fund-raising event in Tullaroan to provide the team with a playing strip. After intensive debate and consultations the club chose the black and amber stripes as the design for the jerseys that they would wear against Limerick that August.

=== Horse racing ===
Gowran Park is a horse racing course near Gowran. The first meeting was held in 1914 and the racecourse hosts 16 race days throughout the year including the Thyestes Chase (The Grand National of the South), one of the prestigious steeplechases in Ireland which has been won by three time Cheltenham Gold Cup Winner, Arkle in 1964 and Aintree Grand National winners Hedgehunter and Numbersixvalverde. It has 16 National Hunt and Flat meetings all year round.

=== Golf ===
Mount Juliet Golf Course is a golf resort situated in Thomastown. It was the venue for the 2002 and 2004 WGC-American Express Championship, having previously hosted the European Tour's Irish Open on three occasions between 1993 and 1995. The par 72, 7,300-yard (6,700 m) Jack Nicklaus designed golf course opened in 1991, and was voted Best Parkland Golf Course by Backspin Golf Magazine in March 2008. There is also a full 18-hole putting course set in the grounds of Mount Juliet House, which is the venue for the annual National Putting Championship.

Kilkenny Golf Club is 18-hole championship parkland course within the town to the North West, close to town centre. It hosted several Professional Championship events. In 1984 and 1996, it was the venue for the All Ireland Mixed Foursome Finals and in 1985 hosted the All Ireland Cups and Shields Finals. The course is mostly flat terrain with an abundance of trees. Around Kilkenny City there is also a Driving Range in Newpark and an 18-hole all weather Par 3 golf course in Pocoke.

Other golf courses include Gowran Park Golf Course in Gowran, Callan Golf Club in Callan, Castlecomer Golf Club in Castlecomer, Mountain View Golf Course in Ballyhale and Carrigleade Golf Course in Graiguenamanagh.

== Culture ==
The Riordans (1965 to 1979) made by Raidió Teilifís Éireann (then called Telefís Éireann) was set in the fictional townland of Leestown in County Kilkenny. Its use of Outside Broadcast Units and its filming of its episodes on location rather than in studio, broke the mould of broadcasting in the soap opera genre. It was the second Irish soap opera and inspired the creation of its British equivalent, Emmerdale Farm (now called Emmerdale) by Yorkshire Television in 1972.

=== County anthem ===
The song "The Rose of Mooncoin" is the traditional anthem of the county at GAA fixtures.

The recently released, Kilkenny by the Nore sung by Alice O'Hanlon is also now considered an anthem.

== Notable people ==
In the book: "Kilkenny: The Landed Gentry & Aristocracy" by Art Kavanagh (2004), he had devoted a chapter each to eighteen of the most prominent Kilkenny Families, chosen 'on a random geographical basis to ensure even distribution over the entire County', as follows – Agar of Gowran, Blunden of Castle Blunden, Bryan of Jenkinstown, Butler (Lords Carrick), Butler of Maidenhall, Butler (Lords Mountgarret), Butler (Earls of Ormonde), Cuffe (Lords Desart), De Montmorency, Flood of Farmley, Langrishe of Knocktopher, Loftus of Mount Juliet, McCalmont of Mount Juliet, Ponsonby (Earls of Bessborough), Power of Kilfane, Smithwick of Kilcreene, St George of Freshford and Wandesforde of Catlecomer.

== See also ==
- List of towns and villages in the Republic of Ireland
- List of abbeys and priories in Ireland (County Kilkenny)
- List of tourist attractions in Ireland
- Lord Lieutenant of Kilkenny
- High Sheriff of County Kilkenny
- High Sheriff of Kilkenny City
