= Mari Power =

Margret Mari Power (1912 or 1913 – 24 June 1936) was a British political activist.

Born Margret Mari Stevenson, she was a daughter of William Henry Stevenson. She joined the East Islington Labour League of Youth, her grandfather having been a Labour Member of Parliament, and at the age of eighteen, she worked for her uncle's newspaper, in South Wales. She spent time attending the Sorbonne, and then worked for the League of Nations in Geneva. While there, her suitors included James Thomas Flexner.

Stevenson met Ivan Power, the son of Conservative MP John Power, and the couple married in 1935, soon after he and his first wife were divorced. Both were supporters of the Labour Party, and tossed a coin to decide who would stand in Hornsey at the 1935 United Kingdom general election. Mari won the coin toss, becoming the youngest woman to stand for parliament anywhere in the country, and Ivan Power worked as her deputy agent. Although she lost the election by more than 20,000 votes, it was the strongest Labour performance in the seat to date. Her performance was praised, and she was expected to be re-adopted.

In June 1936, Power died, at the age of 23, following a short illness.
