= Power baronets of Newlands Manor (1924) =

Escutcheon of the Power baronets of Newlands Manor

The Power baronetcy, of Newlands Manor in Milford in the County of Southampton, was created in the Baronetage of the United Kingdom on 1 February 1924 for John Power. He was the founder of the Royal Institute for International Affairs and represented Wimbledon in the House of Commons as a Unionist. The 2nd Baronet was a member of the London County Council.

== Power baronets, of Newlands Manor (1924) ==
- Sir John Cecil Power, 1st Baronet (1870–1950)
- Sir Ivan McLannahan Power, 2nd Baronet (1903–1954)
- Sir John Patrick McLannahan Power, 3rd Baronet (1928–1984)
- Sir Alastair John Cecil Power, 4th Baronet (born 1958)

The heir apparent to the baronetcy is Mark Alastair John Power (born 1989), only son of the 4th Baronet.
