= Kilkenny Airport =

Kilkenny Airport Aerphort Chill Chainnigh
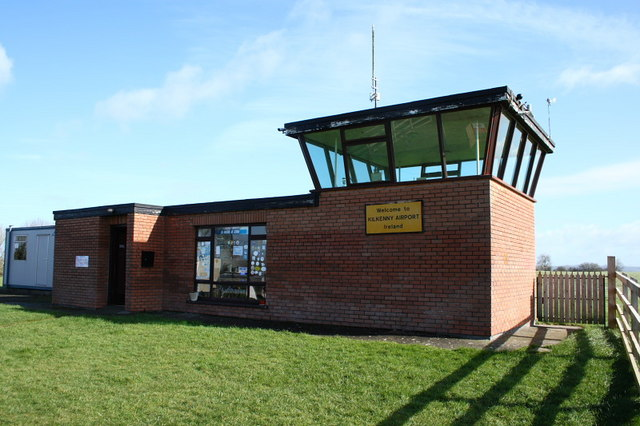
- Control Tower at Kilkenny Airport
- IATA: KKY; ICAO: EIKK

Summary
- Airport type: Private Licence
- Operator: Kilkenny Airport
- Location: Kilkenny
- Elevation AMSL: 300 ft (91 m)
- Coordinates: 52°39′03″N 007°17′46″W
- Website: kilkennyairport.ie/

Map
- Location of airport in Ireland

Runways
| Direction | Length | | Surface |
| Direction | m | ft | Surface |
|---|---|---|---|
| 09/27 | 930 | 3,051 | Grass |

Kilkenny Airport (IATA: KKY, ICAO: EIKK) is an airport located 1.5 NM (2.8 km; 1.7 mi) west of Kilkenny in County Kilkenny, Ireland. The aerodrome was founded in 1963 by John Hehir, Martin Mulhall, Patrick Nolan and Edward Stallard. All founding members were active pilots and natives of Kilkenny. The aerodrome was first licensed by the Department of Transport and Power on 30 April 1965. The aerodrome has remained licensed each year since first license issue. The current license holder is Irish Skydiving Club Limited although this operation was closed in 2022 due to safety issues. The aerodrome consisted originally of two grass runways, but in 1976, this was reduced to a single runway (09/27) and the main runway was extended to 930 metres. There is a flying club based at the aerodrome and the aerodrome facilitates private domestic aircraft and private international flights, mainly from the UK. There are a number of private light aircraft based at the aerodrome. Kilkenny Airport is also home to the Kinair Air Rally, which ran every year for 25 years.

In the Cabin Pressure episode "Uskerty", Kilkenny Airport is a prominent setting.
