= Ballykeeffe Wood =

Nature reserve in County Kilkenny, Ireland

- Coill Bhaile Uí Chaoimh
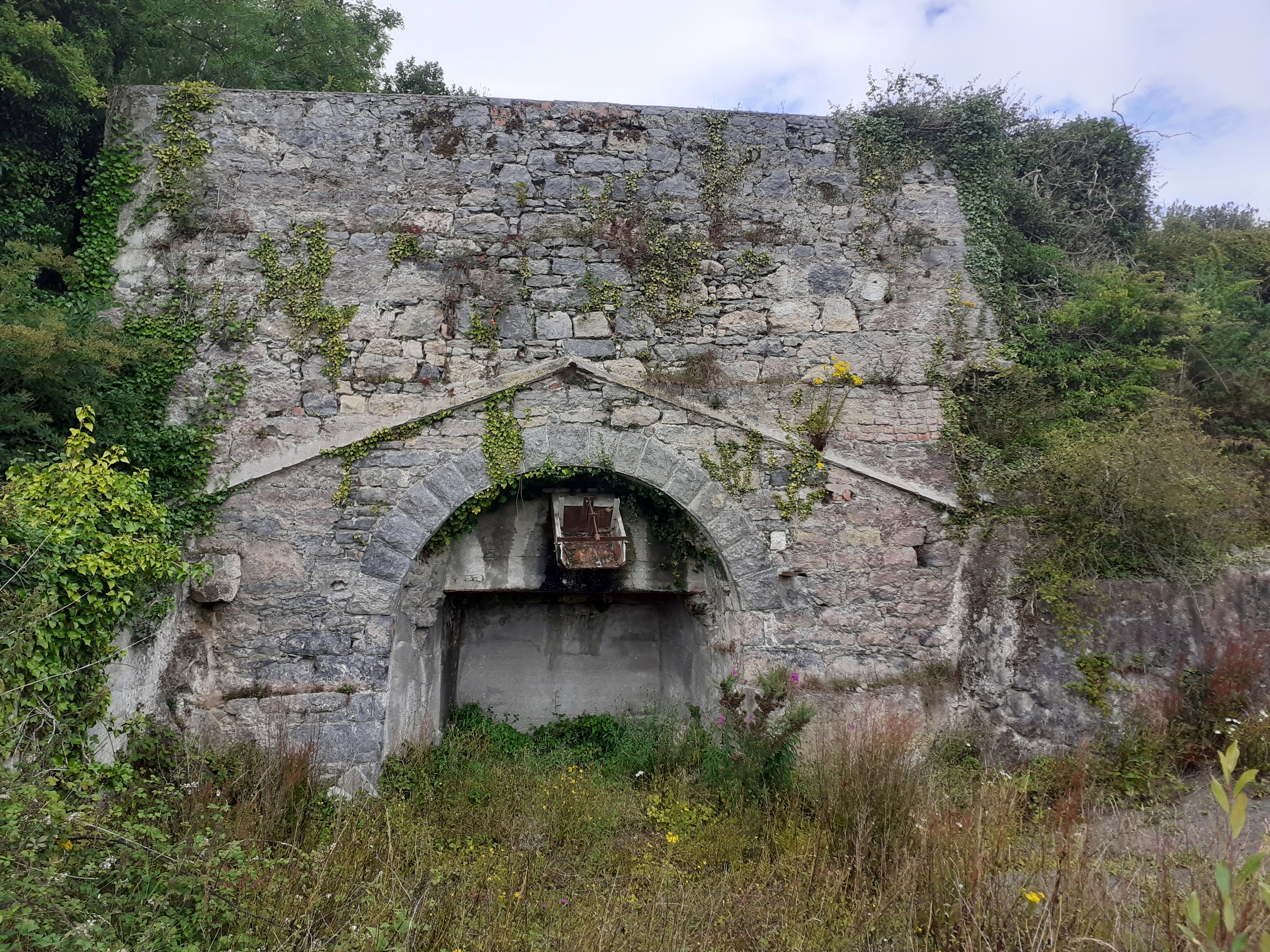

- Location within Ireland
- Interactive map of Ballykeeffe Wood
- Type: National
- Location: County Kilkenny
- Coordinates: 52°36′43″N 7°23′38″W
- Area: 137 acres (55.44 ha)
- Operator: National Parks and Wildlife Service (Ireland)
- Status: Open all year

Ballykeeffe Wood is a national nature reserve of approximately 137 acres (0.55 km^{2}) located in County Kilkenny, Ireland. It is managed by the Irish National Parks and Wildlife Service, part of the Department of Housing, Local Government and Heritage.

== Features ==
Ballykeeffe Wood or Ballykeefe Wood was legally protected as a national nature reserve by the government in 1980.

The woodland features an abundance of bluebells and brambles amongst pedunculate oak and young ash. The wood is adjacent to the old Ballykeeffe limestone mine, which was refurbished in the 1980s and now features rock climbing and an amphitheatre.
