= Ivan Power =

British diplomat and politician

Ivan McLannahan Cecil Power (29 November 1903 – 13 February 1954) was a British diplomat and politician, who served on London County Council.

The son of the Conservative Member of Parliament Sir John Power, 1st Baronet, Power was educated at Charterhouse School and New College, Oxford. He joined the diplomatic service, working in Berlin, then in Australia, including a period as secretary to the Speaker of the Australian House of Representatives. He then returned to Britain.

On 1 June 1927, Power married Nancy Hilary Griffiths, and they had two children, John Patrick McLannahan Power (1928–1984) the third baronet, and Hilary Diana Cecil Power (born 1930).

In England, Power worked for the Empire Parliamentary Association, and in 1934 became chairman of the Stepney Housing Trust. He was also appointed as a member of the British Delegation to the League of Nations, where he met Mari Stevenson. In 1935 he divorced his wife and married Stevenson the same year. Both supported the Labour Party, and Power served as deputy agent when his wife stood for Labour in Hornsey at the 1935 United Kingdom general election in November.

In June 1936, the new Mrs Power died, aged only 23, following a short illness.

At the 1937 London County Council election, Power won a seat in Kensington North, and soon became vice-chairman of the council's finance committee. However, he resigned his seat in 1940, in order to serve in the Royal Air Force during the Second World War.

After the war, Power served as a director of various companies holding land in Africa. He succeeded his father as a baronet in 1950 and died in Johannesburg four years later.

In 1957, his daughter Hilary Diana Cecil Power married Malcolm Erskine, who in 1984 succeeded as 17th. Earl of Buchan.

Baronetage of the United Kingdom
Preceded by John Power	Baronet (of Newlands Manor); 1950–1954	Succeeded by John Patrick McLannahan Power
