= Fiddown Island =

Nature reserve in the River Suir, Ireland

- Location within Ireland
- Type: National
- Location: County Kilkenny
- Coordinates: 52°19′34″N 7°19′05″W
- Area: 52 acres (21.04 ha)
- Operator: National Parks and Wildlife Service (Ireland)
- Status: Open all year

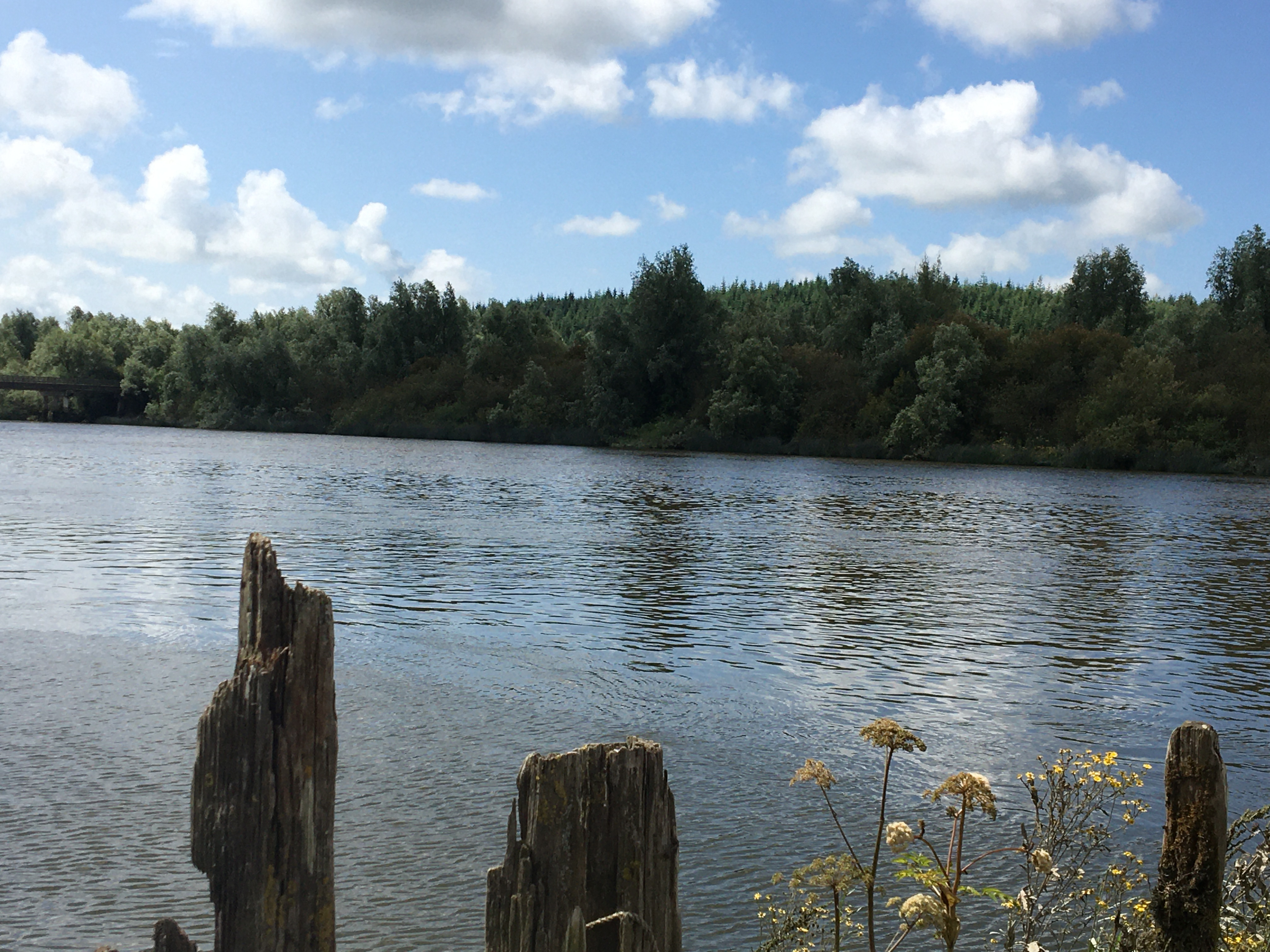
Fiddown Island

Fiddown Island is a national nature reserve of approximately 52 acres (0.21 km^{2}) located in County Kilkenny, Ireland. It is managed by the Irish National Parks & Wildlife Service.

== Features ==
Fiddown Island was legally protected as a national nature reserve by the Irish government in 1988.

Fiddown Island is a narrow, long island in the River Suir. It is an alluvial woodland which is predominantly willow, used for basket making, such as osier, almond, white, and grey willow. The flora includes Iris pseudacorus, hemlock water-dropwort, angelica, meadowsweet, valerian sedges, grasses, and tall herbs. The Island is bordered with reed swamps and covered in willow scrub, and is the only known habitat of this sort in Ireland. In the drier areas ash, hawthorn and blackthorn trees have been recorded.

Other animals associated with the site include otters, Daubenton's bats and kingfishers. Among the birds found in the reserve are grasshopper, sedge and willow warblers, blackcaps, long-tailed tits, cormorants, teals, water rails, mute and whooper swans, little egrets, whitethroats, and reed buntings. Due to the Island's willow trees, it is also known locally as Sally Island. The reeds were used locally for thatched roofs, with hazel and guelder rose also found on the Island.

The underlying geology of the site is yellow and red sandstone and green mudstone of the Kiltorcan formation.
