= Freestone Hill =

Burial cairn in Ireland

Coordinates: 52.6543°N 7.1303°W

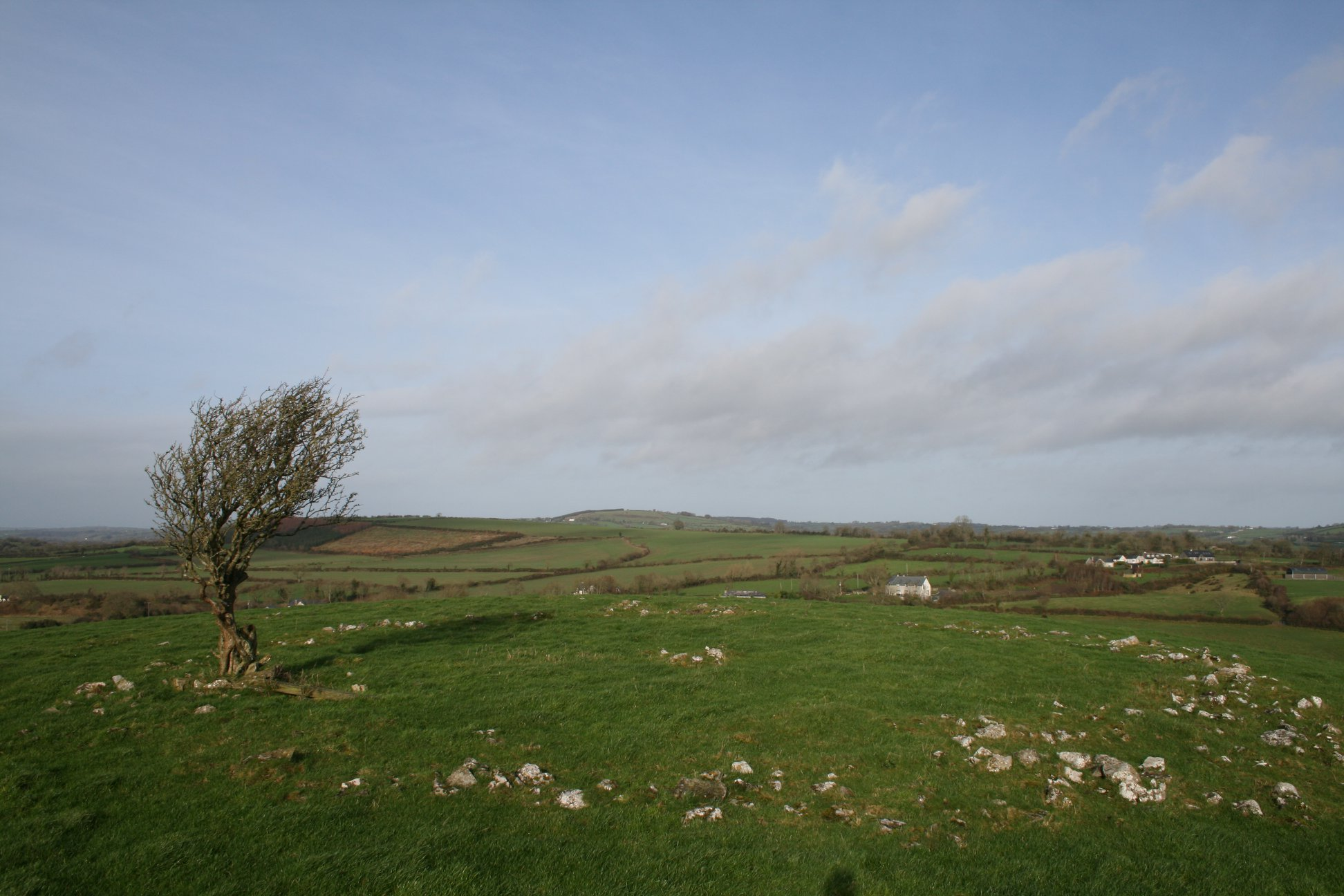
Summit of Freestone Hill.

Freestone Hill is a prehistoric burial cairn and Iron Age hillfort in County Kilkenny in Ireland. A lone thorn tree stands at its top.

== Geography ==
The cairn is located approximately 6.4 kilometres (4.0 mi) east of Kilkenny City. The hill rises steeply on all sides above the surrounding and the summit is a lightly rounded plateau. The view from the summit is vast, enabling the onlooker to see much of the encompassing region of County Kilkenny. Freestone Hill is seen to lay within the large natural "amphitheatre" surrounded by the Wicklow Mountains to the north, the Blackstairs to the east, Slievnaman to the south-west, and the Galtees to the west.

== Description ==
The burial mound at Freestone Hill was built to contain human remains during the Early Bronze Age, around 2000 BCE. Gerhard Bursu excavated the site in 1946, finding three inhumation burials as well as thirteen cremations, two of which were associated with food vessel pottery from the era. No inhumations at the site were buried with grave goods, but the excavation report suggests that they may have been secondary insertions into the burial cairn.
