= Brandon Hill =

Mountain in County Kilkenny, Ireland

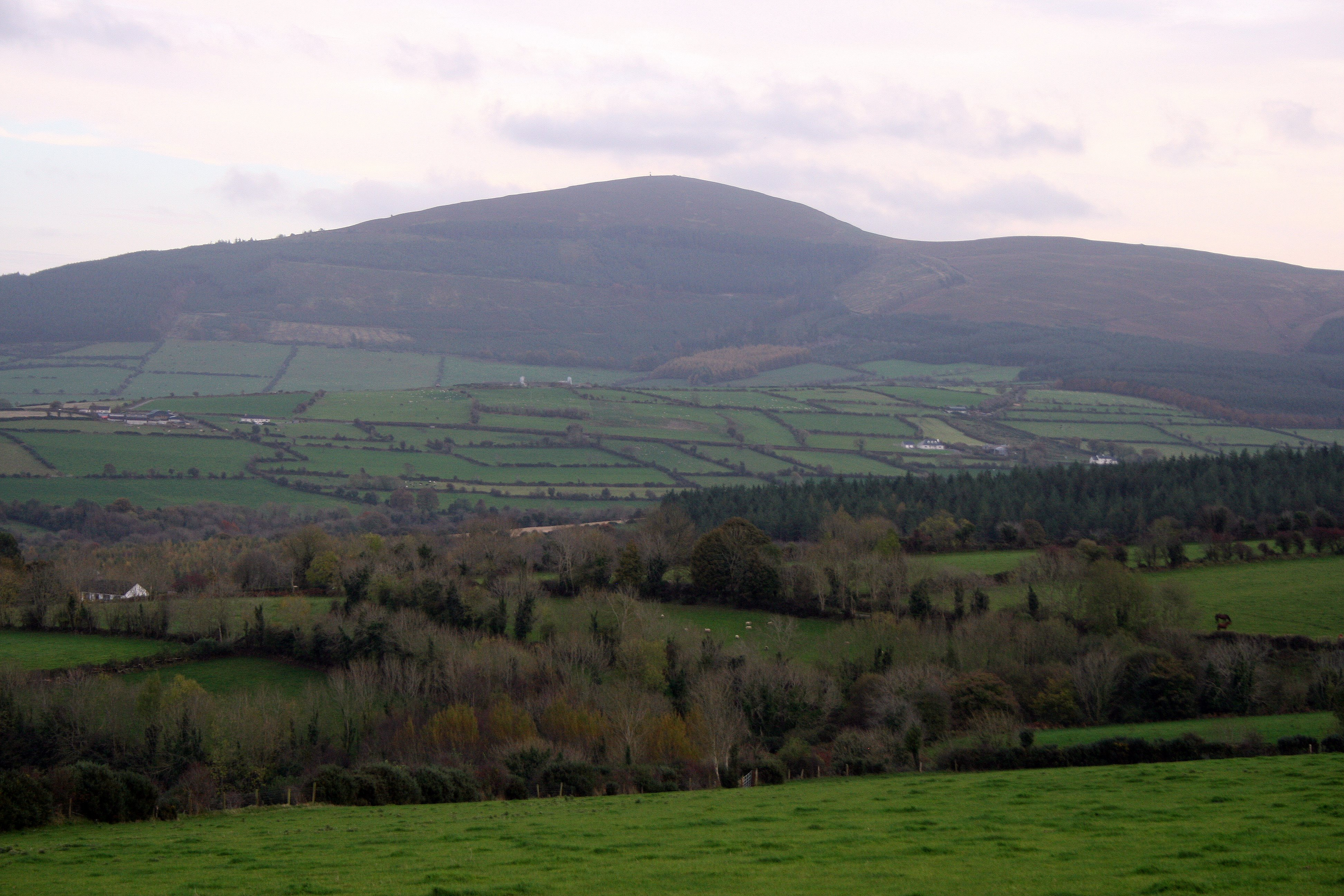
- Brandon Hill from the northwest

Highest point
- Elevation: 515 m (1,690 ft)
- Prominence: 450 m (1,480 ft)
- Listing: County top (Kilkenny), Marilyn, Arderin
- Coordinates: 52.509704°N 6.974251°W

Naming
- Native name: Cnoc Bhréanail

Geography
- Location within island of Ireland
- Location: County Kilkenny, Ireland
- OSI/OSNI grid: S697402
- Topo map: OSi Discovery 68

Brandon Hill (Irish: Cnoc Bhréanail) is the highest mountain in County Kilkenny, Ireland, with an elevation of 515 m (1,690 ft) and prominence at 448 m (1,470 ft). The South Leinster Way, a long-distance trail, meandering through the Barrow Valley and traverses Brandon Hill. The village of Graiguenamanagh and River Barrow are at the base of the hill. It is classified as a county high point, an Arderin, a Myrddyn Dewey, and a Marilyn.

== Classification ==
Brandon Hill has various classifications (§ DoBIH codes). Brandon Hill (Gribbon No. 071) is known as the county high point but are also sometimes referred to as county top and county peak. It is listed as one of the 200 Myrddyn Deweys, which are the Irish equivalent of Deweys. It is listed as one of the 407 Arderins, which are the Irish equivalent of the Hewitt.

Brandon Hill has a regional height rank of 151 of 454 Marilyns in Ireland (389 in the Republic of Ireland and 66 in Northern Ireland), and a regional prominence of 53. With a height rank of 1098 and prominence rank of 269 of the total for the British Isles of 2,011.

== Geography ==
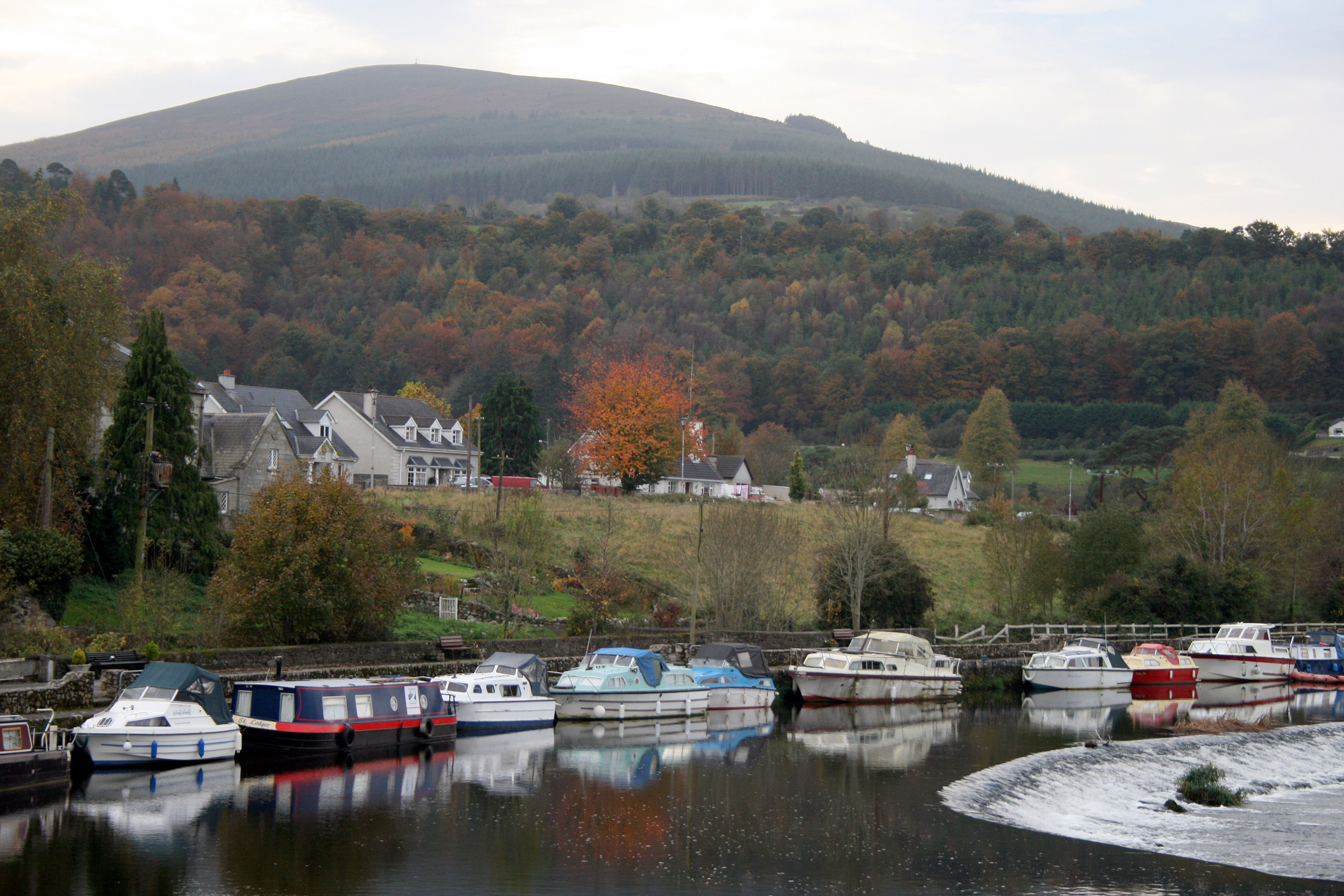
Brandon Hill from the River Barrow in Graiguenamanagh

Brandon is 4-kilometres South-South West of Graiguenamanagh, 7-kilometres east of Inistioge and 11-kilometres east of Thomastown, in the south of County Kilkenny. Brandon Hill is in the barony of Gowran and in the province of Leinster. The village of Graiguenamanagh is at the base of the hill.

== Geology ==
It is the termination of the chain of granitic mountains that raise from the shores of Dublin bay. The base of Brandon Hill on the side of the River Barrow and the hill running to Graigue is composed of schist rock. This blackish siliceous schistus, sometimes containing grains of quartz and when it is broken it has a shivery texture and is hard enough to scratch glass. There are a few beds of marble and limestone gravel near the foot of the mountain.

== Archaeology ==
Evidence regarding the early settlement of the Brandon Hill uplands came to light as a result of ground and aerial surveys directed by Michael Gibbons, an archaeologist with the Board of Works, in 1989. The survey indicated that the slopes of Brandon were settled in excess of four thousand years ago and that the cairns, house sites, field systems and a large ritual enclosure identified on its slopes are part of the prehistoric remains there. Two Norman moated sites, with long rectangular buildings attached - probably granges or farms attached to Duiske Abbey and thought to be about 600 years old - were also identified on the lower slopes in the Ballyogan townland area during the survey.

== See also ==
- Lists of mountains in Ireland
- List of Irish counties by highest point
- List of mountains of the British Isles by height
- List of Marilyns in the British Isles
