= Monefelim River =

River in Ireland

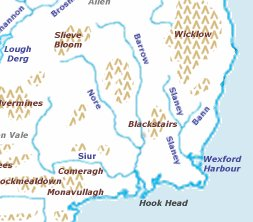
- Map showing the location of the Three Sisters rivers.

- Location of the mouth in Ireland
- Etymology: bogland river
- Native name: Abhainn Mhóin Fheidhlim (Irish)

Location
- County: Ireland
- Counties: Kilkenny
- Barony: Gowran

Physical characteristics
- Source: Gowran (barony)
  - coordinates: 52.7118151°N 7.1036112°W
- Mouth: Ballyvalden River
  - coordinates: 52.6576°N 7.0195°W
  - elevation: 28.36 m (93.0 ft)
- Length: 17 km (11 mi)
- Basin size: 41.79 km^{2} (16.14 mi^{2})

Basin features
- Progression: Ballyvalden River—River Barrow—Celtic Sea
- River system: River Barrow
- EU_CD: IE_SE_14M030600

The Monefelim River (Irish: Abhainn Mhóin Fheidhlim, meaning 'bogland river') is a river in County Kilkenny, Ireland. It is a tributary of the Ballyvalden River before it in turn joins the River Barrow. It is part of the Barrow catchment area. The local authority is Kilkenny County Council.

== See also ==
- Rivers of Ireland
