= Kylecorragh Wood =

- Location within Ireland
- Location: County Kilkenny, Ireland
- Nearest city: New Ross
- Coordinates: 52°25′13″N 7°00′01″W
- Area: 100 acres (400,000 m^{2})
- Established: 2002
- Governing body: National Parks & Wildlife Service

Kylecorragh Wood is an old oak woodland along the freshwater stretches of the River Nore in County Kilkenny, Ireland. Located 5 kilometres (3.1 mi) west of New Ross, it consists of 100 acres (400,000 m^{2}). Kylecorragh Woods are of regional importance as a relatively undisturbed example of the original deciduous woodland which covered the river valley.

The site is a Natura 2000 "Old Oak Woodlands" habitat, and is a prominent feature in the "River Barrow and River Nore, Special Area of Conservation (SAC)" area, formally proposed in 2002. The woods contain oak and sycamore. The high canopy provides a damp ground for rich and varied flora, including common holly and hazel, blackthorn, gorse, and willow.

The National Parks and Wildlife Service responsibilities include the protection of the site. The local authority is Kilkenny County Council.
