= Graiguenamanagh =

Town in County Kilkenny, Ireland

Graiguenamanagh Irish: Gráig na Manach
- Town
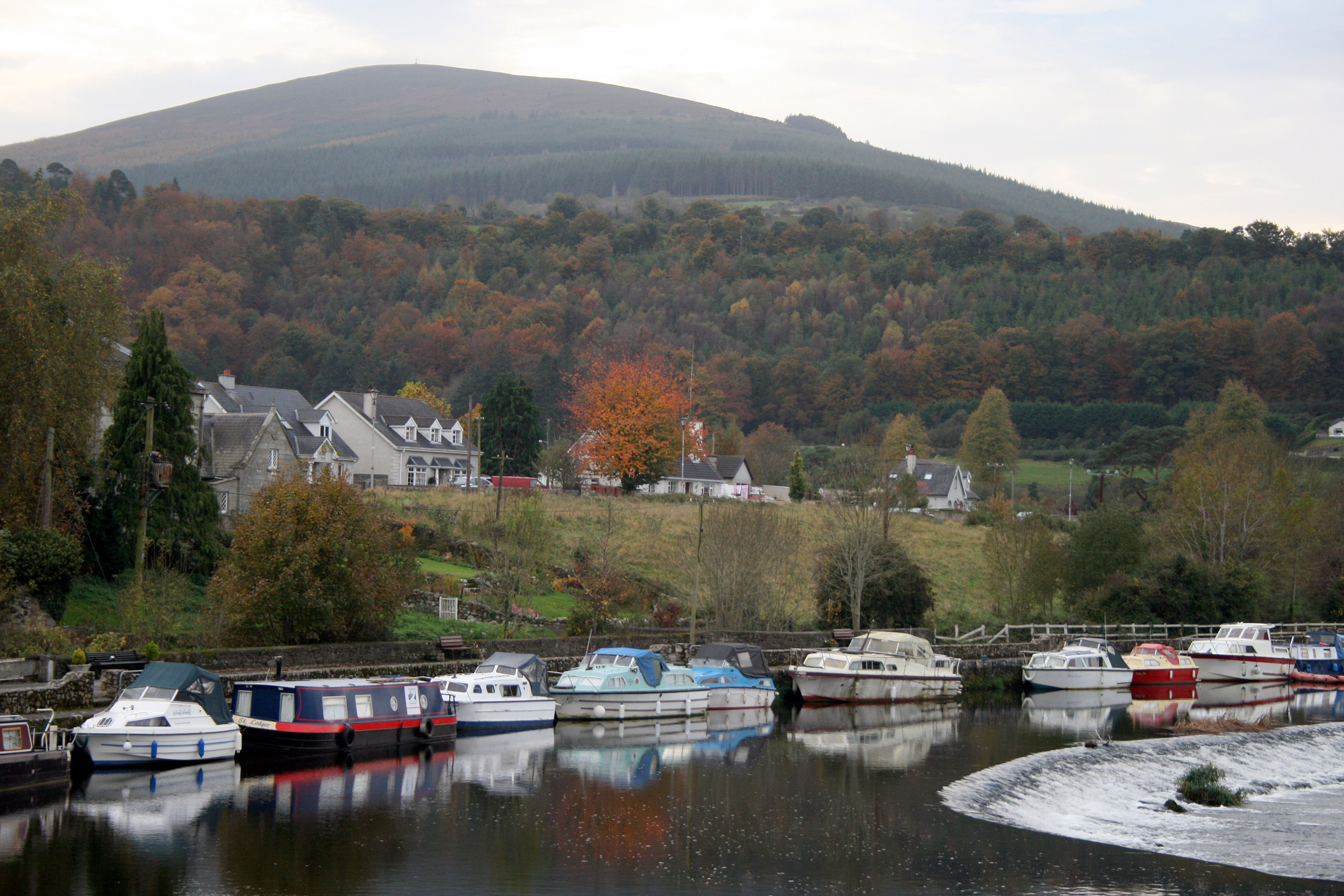
- View of Graiguenamanagh with the River Barrow

- Location in Ireland
- Coordinates: 52.540°N 6.955°W
- Country: Ireland
- Province: Leinster
- Counties: Kilkenny; Carlow
- Elevation: 32 m (105 ft)

Population (2022)
  - Total: 1,506
- Irish Grid Reference: S705440

Graiguenamanagh or Graignamanagh (Irish: Gráig na Manach, meaning 'valley (or village) of the monks') is a town on the River Barrow in County Kilkenny, Ireland. It is 17 km north of New Ross and 23 km east of Kilkenny city. Part of the settlement, known as Tinnahinch, is on the County Carlow side of the river, and Carlow County Council refers to the whole village as "Graiguenamanagh-Tinnahinch". Also combined for census purposes, as of the 2022 census, Graiguenamanagh-Tinnahinch had a population of 1,506 people. The town is in a townland and civil parish of the same name.

Graiguenamanagh is located at the foot of Brandon Hill and is home to Duiske Abbey, the largest of the thirty-four mediaeval Cistercian abbeys in Ireland.

== History ==
=== Ecclesiastical sites ===
Evidence of ancient settlement in the area include an ecclesiastical enclosure and holy well sites in the townlands of Graiguenamanagh and Tinnahinch. St. Caelán reputedly founded a monastery at Tinnahinch during the 6th or 7th century.

Also located in the area are the ruined remains of the early Christian church of Ullard, founded by Saint Fiachra in the seventh century. Several miles downstream from Graiguenamanagh are the ruins of an ancient monastic establishment at St Mullin's.

Historical population
Year	Pop.	±%
1821	1,546	—
1831	2,130	+37.8%
1841	2,248	+5.5%
1851	1,710	−23.9%
1861	1,320	−22.8%
1871	1,272	−3.6%
1881	1,172	−7.9%
1891	973	−17.0%
1901	852	−12.4%
1911	844	−0.9%
1926	799	−5.3%
1936	845	+5.8%
1946	1,064	+25.9%
1951	1,076	+1.1%
1956	1,366	+27.0%
1961	1,244	−8.9%
1966	1,177	−5.4%
1971	1,303	+10.7%
1981	1,532	+17.6%
1986	1,485	−3.1%
1991	1,395	−6.1%
1996	1,374	−1.5%
2002	1,435	+4.4%
2006	1,376	−4.1%
2011	1,543	+12.1%
2016	1,475	−4.4%
2022	1,506	+2.1%

=== Duiske Abbey ===
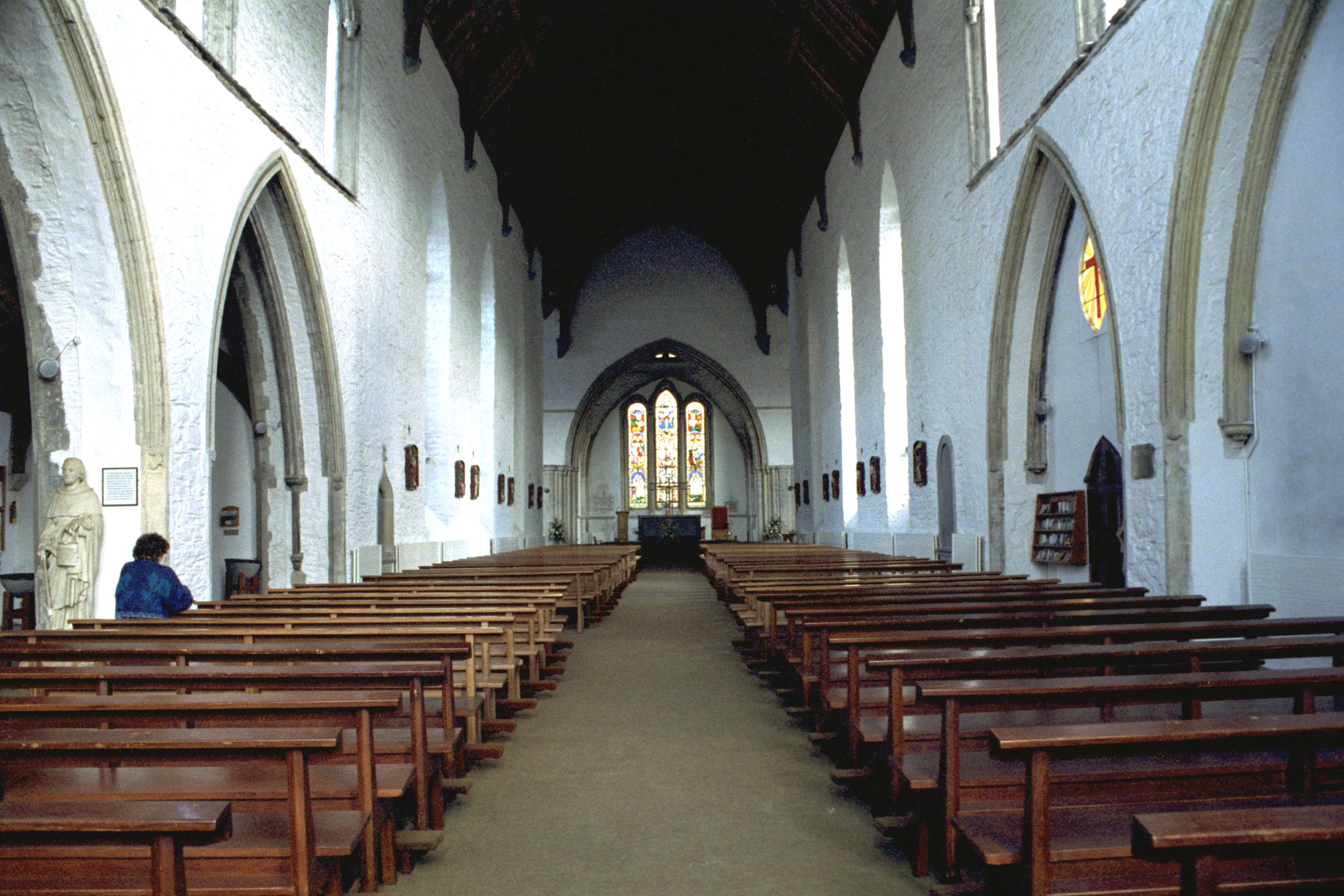
Duiske Abbey's 13th-century nave, in the early English style, was restored in the late 20th century.

Based on an earlier settlement, much of Graiguenamanagh developed around the early 13th-century Duiske Abbey. The abbey, which takes its name from the river Duiske (Blackwater) which joins the Barrow here, was founded by William Marshall in 1204 and was suppressed by Henry VIII in 1536. Some remains of the monastery exist to the rear of the houses that line the east side of Lower Main Street.

The abbey's large "Early English" gothic church was restored in the 1980s, and it is now the Catholic parish church in Graiguenamanagh. In its northern aisle is a model which shows the monastery as it was in the fourteenth century.

=== Economic development ===
The River Barrow, historically a transport route, was developed as a commercial navigation during the 18th century. Graiguenamanagh Bridge, a seven-arched limestone bridge spanning the River Barrow, was built in 1764.

Graiguenamanagh served as a base for commercial barges operating on the river until barge traffic ceased in 1959. These barges were later replaced by pleasure craft.

== Public transport ==
The town is located on the R705 regional road. Kilbride Coaches operate a route linking it to Kilkenny via Gowran.

== Recreation and culture ==
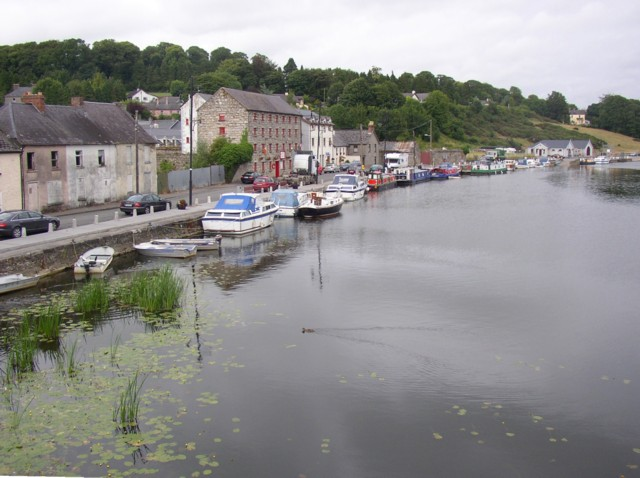
The River Barrow in Graiguenamanagh

Watersports, angling, walking and cycling (including on the Barrow towpath) are common activities in the Graiguenamanagh area. The Barrow's aquatic facilities include fishing, swimming, kayaking, and canoeing. The South Leinster Way, a long-distance trail, runs across the Barrow Valley and nearby Brandon Hill.

The local Gaelic Athletic Association club, Graignamanagh GAA, fields teams in Gaelic football and hurling competitions and is based in Dr Tierney Park in the town. The town is also home to an athletics club and a soccer club.

There is a series of statues of monks in Graiguenamanagh, including several which depict the activities traditionally carried out by the Cistercian monks of Duiske Abbey. There is also a public library in the center of town. The Abbey Centre, beside the library, is home to an art gallery and a small museum.

== See also ==
- List of abbeys and priories in Ireland (County Kilkenny)
