= Power baronets of Edermine (1841) =

Escutcheon of the Power baronets of Edermine

The Power baronetcy, of Edermine in the County of Wexford, was created in the Baronetage of the United Kingdom on 18 October 1841 for John Power, a member of the Powers distilling dynasty. The 2nd and 3rd Baronets represented County Wexford in the House of Commons. The title became extinct on the death of the 6th Baronet in 1930.

== Power baronets, of Edermine (1841) ==
- Sir John Power, 1st Baronet (1771–1855)
- Sir James Power, 2nd Baronet (1800–1877)
- Sir John Talbot Power, 3rd Baronet (1845–1901)
- Sir James Douglas Talbot Power, 4th Baronet (1884–1914)
- Sir James Talbot Power, 5th Baronet (1851–1916)
- Sir Thomas Talbot Power, 6th Baronet (1863–1930)
