= Sir John Power, 1st Baronet =

British export merchant, developer and Conservative politician

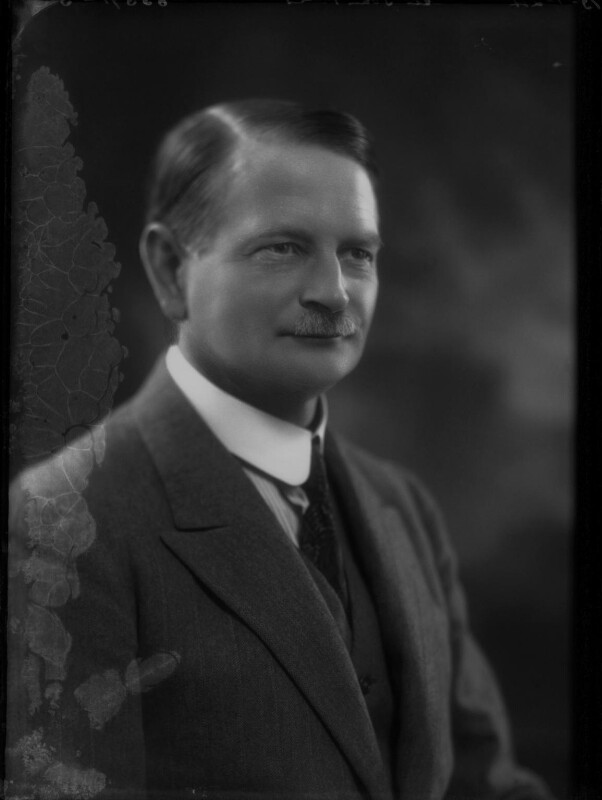
Power in 1924

Sir John Cecil Power, 1st Baronet, (21 December 1870 – 5 June 1950) was a British export merchant, developer and Conservative politician at national level for 21 years then choosing not to seek re-election at the age of 74.

== Working life and legacies ==
Born at Eldon, County Down, he was the son of William Taylor Power by his wife, Cecilia née Burgoyne. The family moved to London when he was aged 10. With his brother, Frederick, he entered the family business of Power, Power and Company export merchants. As a young man he travelled much in Europe and North America. In 1902 he married Mabel Perks, with whom he had five children.

Power started his own real estate business, becoming a wealthy developer owning prime property in central London including Adastral House in the redeveloped Kingsway. Power became known for his generous financial gifts to various institutions. Of £24,000 collected to allow the construction of the Institute of Historical Research in 1921, Power gave £20,000 (equivalent to £1,100,000 in 2023). In 1923 he gave a large donation that allowed for the purchase of the site of Chatham House as the headquarters of the Institute of International Affairs; Power was Honorary Treasurer of that institute from 1921 to 1943. He was also an active member of the League of Nations Union, sitting on its executive for seven years and also on various committees. He was a committee member of the Royal Humane Society and donated a site for the first headquarters of the British Council.

In 1924, Power was created a baronet, of Newlands Manor, Milford, Hampshire, reflecting his buying of that manor house from George Cornwallis-West. In the general election in the same year he was elected as Member of Parliament for Wimbledon, holding the seat until his retirement due to ill health at the 1945 general election. Lady Power died suddenly in the same year, a loss that affected him deeply. His retirement years were spent at his Hampshire home and a villa at Grasse on the French Riviera. He had sold Newlands Manor house before his death. He died in France in 1950, aged 79.

Sir John was succeeded in the baronetcy by his elder son, Ivan McLannahan Cecil Power, a London County Councillor and director of various companies. Ivan had, by his first wife Nancy, daughter of Rev. John Griffiths: John Power (3rd baronet) and Hilary, later Lady Cardross then from 1984 therefore Countess of Buchan settled at Newnham House, Hampshire.

Parliament of the United Kingdom
Preceded by Sir Joseph Hood, Bt	Member of Parliament for Wimbledon; 1924–1945	Succeeded by Arthur Palmer
Baronetage of the United Kingdom
New creation	Baronet (of Newlands Manor); 1924–1950	Succeeded by Ivan Power
