= Power baronets =

Set index for Power baronets

There have been three baronetcies created for persons with the surname Power, all in the Baronetage of the United Kingdom.

- Power baronets of Kilfane (1836)
- Power baronets of Edermine (1841)
- Power baronets of Newlands Manor (1924)
