= N9 road (Ireland) =

Road in Ireland

N9 road
- Bóthar N9

Route information
- Length: 119.09 km (74.00 mi)

Location
- Country: Ireland
- Primary destinations: (bypassed routes in italics): County Kildare; Newbridge; Athgarvan; Kilcullen; Castledermot; County Carlow; Carlow; Leighlinbridge; Bagenalstown; County Kilkenny; Paulstown; Bennettsbridge; Stoneyford; Terminates at N24 in Grannagh

Highway system
- Roads in Ireland; Motorways; Primary; Secondary; Regional

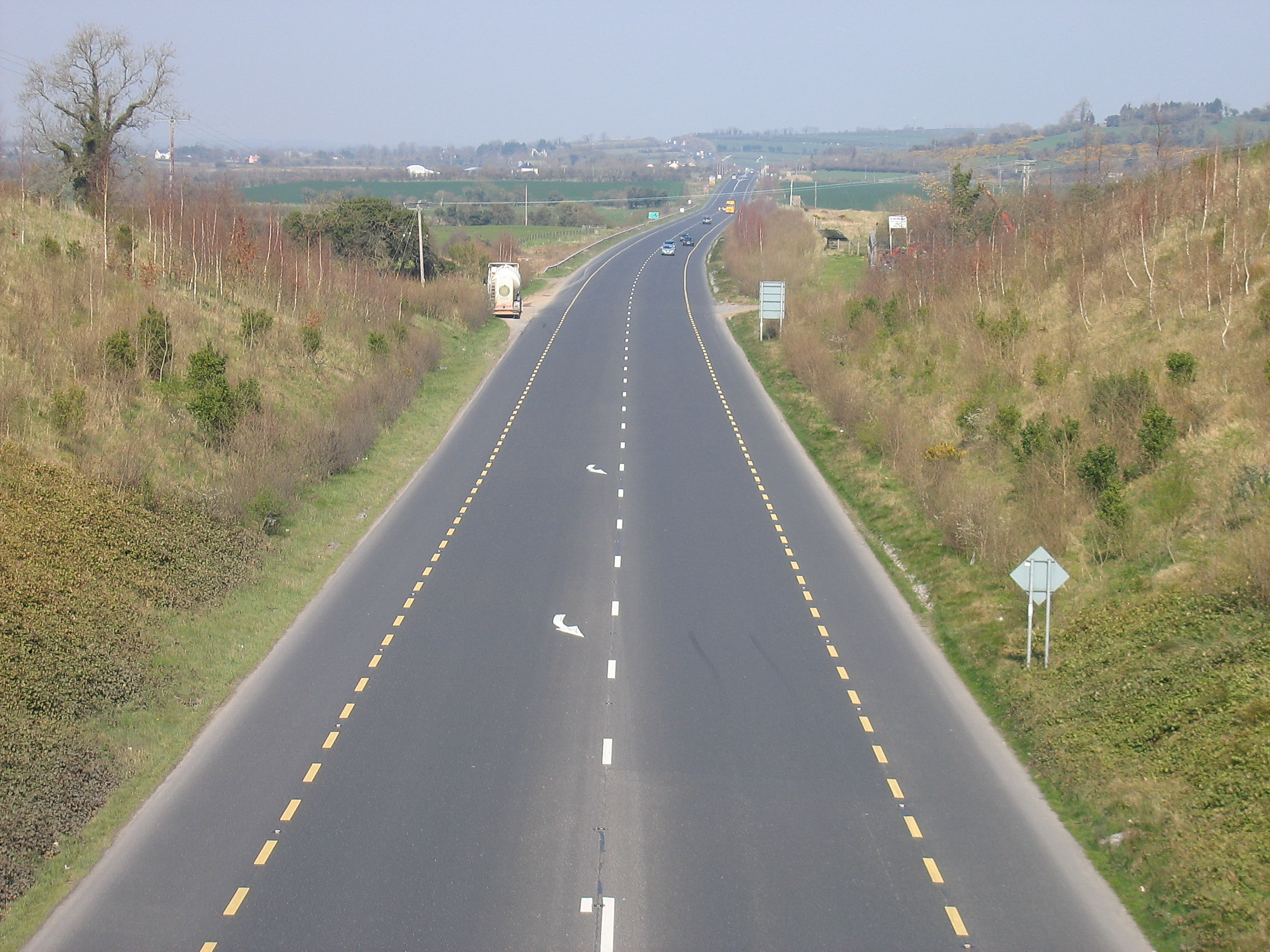
R448 Moone-Timolin bypass, County Kildare, the former N9 now itself bypassed by the M9

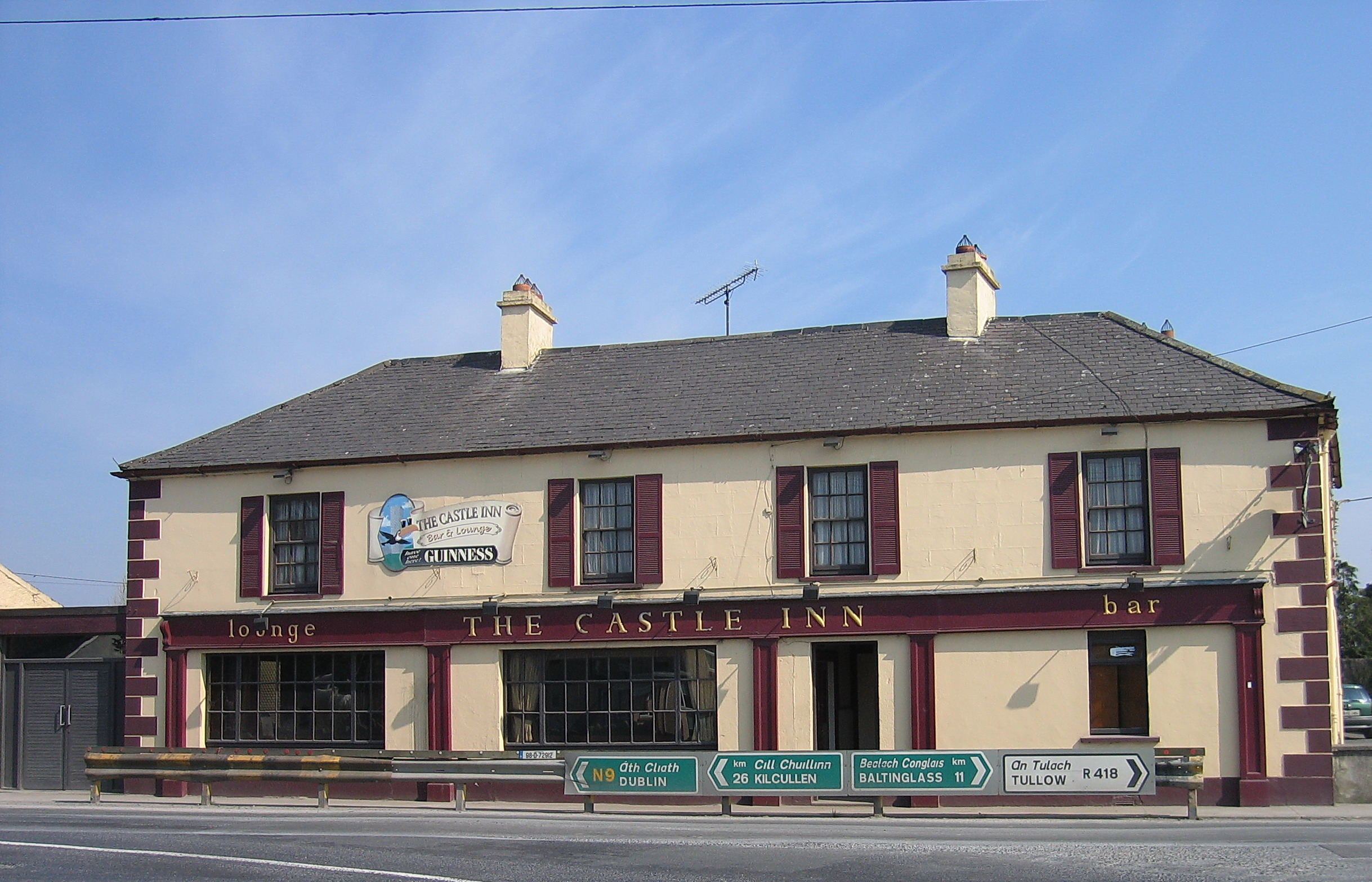
Castledermot at the former N9/R418 junction

The N9 road is a national primary road in Ireland running from Junction 11 on the M7, located near Kilcullen, County Kildare, to Waterford city. The route connects Dublin and Waterford. The section of the route from junction 11 on the M7 at Kilcullen to the intersection with the N24 road outside Waterford is motorway standard since 2010 and is designated as the M9 motorway. In line with Irish practice, all sections previously designated N9 were renumbered at that time. Only a short (550-metre) section of the route is still designated as N9 between the Quarry roundabout junction with the N24 and the N25 Grannagh Roundabout junction. This section is dual carriageway.

== Route ==
The route starts as motorway southwest of Newbridge (see thumbnail), and on the southwest side of Kilcullen. Prior to the 1993 opening of the Newbridge bypass, the N9 had run from Naas (east of the current M9). The previous route is now the R448.

The previous route continued south through Kilgowan, the intersection with the N78 to Athy, Ballitore, the R747, Timolin, Moone and through Castledermot in County Kildare. This is currently bypassed by the Kilcullen to Carlow section of the M9 opened in December 2009. This then joins with another 18.5 km (11.5 mi) stretch of motorway, opened 29 May 2008 bypassing Carlow, meeting the R448 at a junction near Powerstown. Further south, the M9 crosses the River Barrow bypassing Leighlinbridge to the west, and continuing south to pass west of Bagnelstown (Muine Bheag), then entering County Kilkenny.

At Paulstown the N10 diverges west/southwest to serve Kilkenny and the present section of the M9. The M9 bypasses Gowran, Dungarvan and Thomastown. This section of the N9 opened as motorway in September 2010 and completed the M9 motorway. Motorists join the M9 via the N10 from Kilkenny onto the M9 section from Danesfort to Waterford. From Powerstown and further on, just north of Ballyhale the former N10 rejoins the R448, having proceeded south from Kilkenny. Lukeswell, Mullinavat and Dunkitt lie along the R448 route south towards Waterford. The M9 ends at the Quarry roundabout junction with the N24. A short section of the route designated as N9 continues towards the Granagh interchange where the route terminates and intersects with the N25 Waterford bypass.

== M9 motorway and upgrades ==
The National Development Plan included plans for a motorway from Dublin to Waterford. While these plans were later altered to High Quality Dual Carriageway, in July 2008 the road was reclassified as a motorway once more. An environmental impact assessment was published in October 2003 and a CPO issued in November 2003 for the 46 km (29 mi) dual-carriageway forming the northern part of the Kilcullen–Waterford route, from Kilcullen, County Kildare to Powerstown, County Carlow. An EIS was published and a CPO issued in February 2005 for the 64 km (40 mi) southern section of the upgraded route, from Powerstown to Waterford.

The southern section of route differs more from the former N9 alignment than most of the national road upgrade projects in recent years. The N10 provides a link to Kilkenny, to the west of the M9. The new alignment of the M9 passes further west, closer to Kilkenny, with a new shorter N10 link to the M9 on the northeast side of Kilkenny. The N10 remains as far as Danesfort for the link southeast of Kilkenny. The timeline of upgrades to the former N9 route was:

- M9 Kilcullen to Carlow; 28 km, completed and opened in December 2009
- The Carlow Bypass was the first section of the project to be completed, opening on 29 May 2008. It opened as a section of the N9, although built to motorway standards; and was officially upgraded to motorway (complete with a 20 km/h increase in speed limit) on 24 September 2008.
- M9/N10 Carlow/Knocktopher; 40 km, completed and opened on 9 September 2010
- M9 Waterford/Knocktopher; 24 km, completed and opened 22 March 2010.

A bypass of Waterford was opened in 2009, as part of the N25 that previously passed southeast–northwest through the city. As part of the project, the new M9 joins at a roundabout just off the Granagh Interchange which then allows access to Waterford City or the bypass to Rosslare/Cork.

== See also ==
- Roads in Ireland
- National secondary road
- Regional road
