= M9 motorway (Ireland) =

Motorway linking M7 and Waterford

M9 motorway
- Mótarbhealach M9
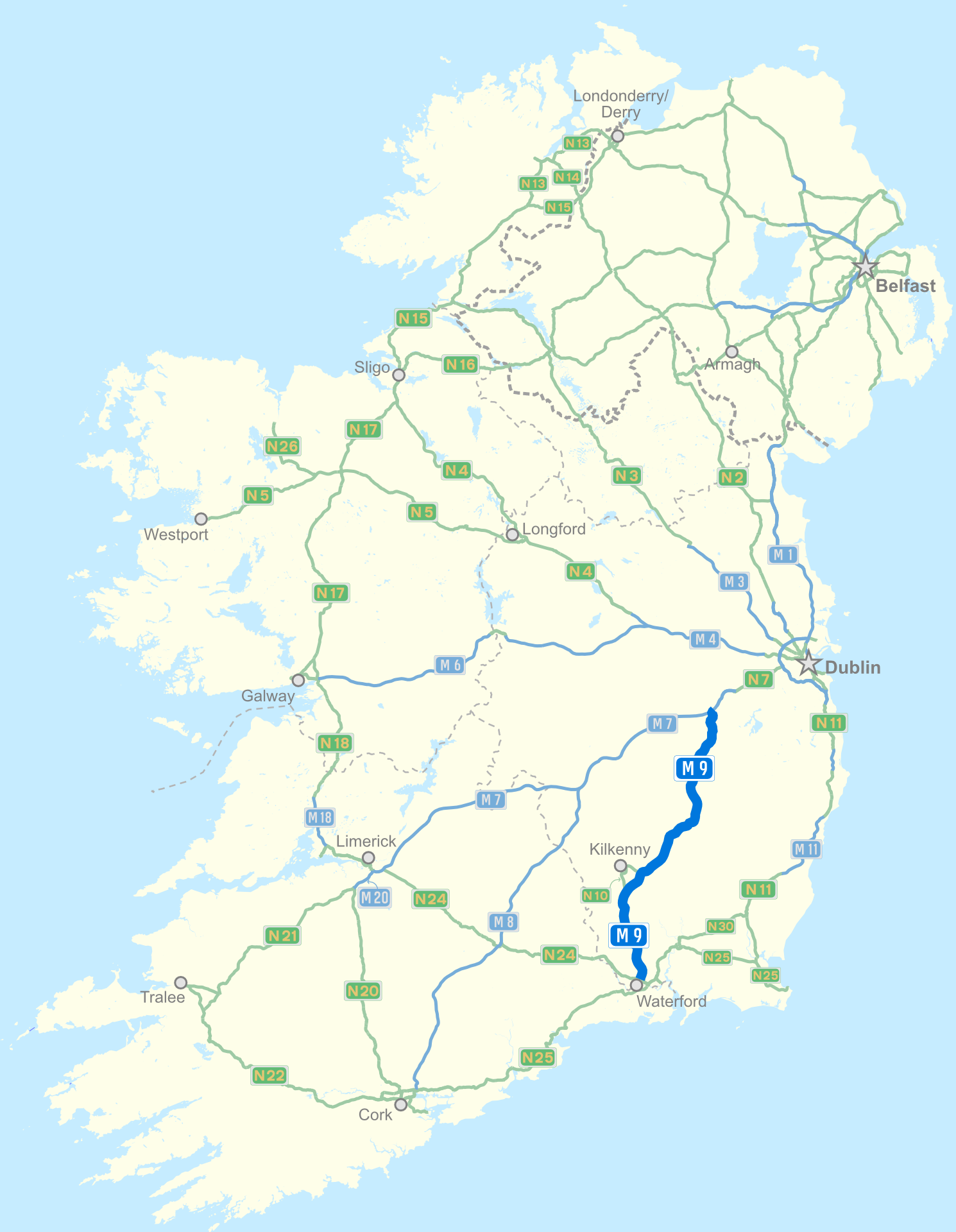
- Clickable image

Route information
- Length: 119 km (74 mi)
- Existed: 1994–present
- History: Completed 1994–2010

Major junctions
- From: M7 junction 11
- J1 → M7 motorway J3 → N78 road J5 → N80 road J8 → N10 road J9 → N10 road J12 → N24 road
- To: Waterford

Location
- Country: Ireland
- Primary destinations: Athy, Carlow, Kilkenny

Highway system
- Roads in Ireland; Motorways; Primary; Secondary; Regional

The M9 motorway (Irish: Mótarbhealach M9) is a motorway in Ireland linking the M7 between Naas and Newbridge near Kilcullen to Waterford. Opened in sections between 1994 and 2010, the final section opened on 9 September 2010.

Prior to July 2008, the majority of the M9 – from Junction 2 onwards – was to be built as High Quality Dual Carriageway (HQDC). Due to the passing of a Statutory Instrument in that month, a large section of the route was re-designated to motorway standard. The section included the motorway between Kilcullen and Powerstown and the Carlow bypass. The remainder of the route has since been redesignated.

== Route ==
=== M7 to Kilcullen ===
The M9 begins at Junction 11 (previously Junction 9) on the M7 motorway. This junction is a restricted access interchange, allowing traffic from the M9 to enter only the eastbound carriageway. There is no access to the M9 from the M7 eastbound, or to the M7 westbound from the M9. The route continues for 6 km before reaching the Kilcullen to Carlow section. The section runs between Junctions 1 and 2 on the M9 corridor. This section opened on 24 October 1994.

=== Kilcullen to Carlow ===
Construction of 28 km of motorway linking the Kilcullen bypass with the Carlow bypass began in February 2008. This section was completed and opened on 21 December 2009. It runs between Junctions 2 and 4 on the M9 corridor.

=== Carlow Bypass ===
This 18.5 km (11 mi) section of motorway opened on 29 May 2008 and runs between Junctions 4 and 6 on the M9 corridor. It provides a bypass of Carlow and allows access to the N80 for Rosslare and the R448 for Leighlinbridge.

=== Carlow to Knocktopher ===
The first part of this section between Junctions 9 and 10 (Danesfort-Knocktopher) comprising 12 km of motorway was opened on 22 March 2010, in conjunction with the Knocktopher to Waterford section. The remaining section, Leighlinbridge to Danesfort, opened on 9 September 2010, thus completing the entire motorway. The scheme was built by SiskRoadbridge(SRB) Ltd.

=== Knocktopher to Waterford ===
The Knocktopher-Waterford section of the M9 route was opened on 22 March 2010. This section is 24 km long and runs between Junctions 10 and 12 on the M9 corridor. The scheme was built by BAM Ltd (formerly Ascon Ltd.). Junction 12 is not a standard motorway junction but is instead a roundabout. The left exit from this roundabout accesses the N9 road which continues to Waterford.

== Junctions ==
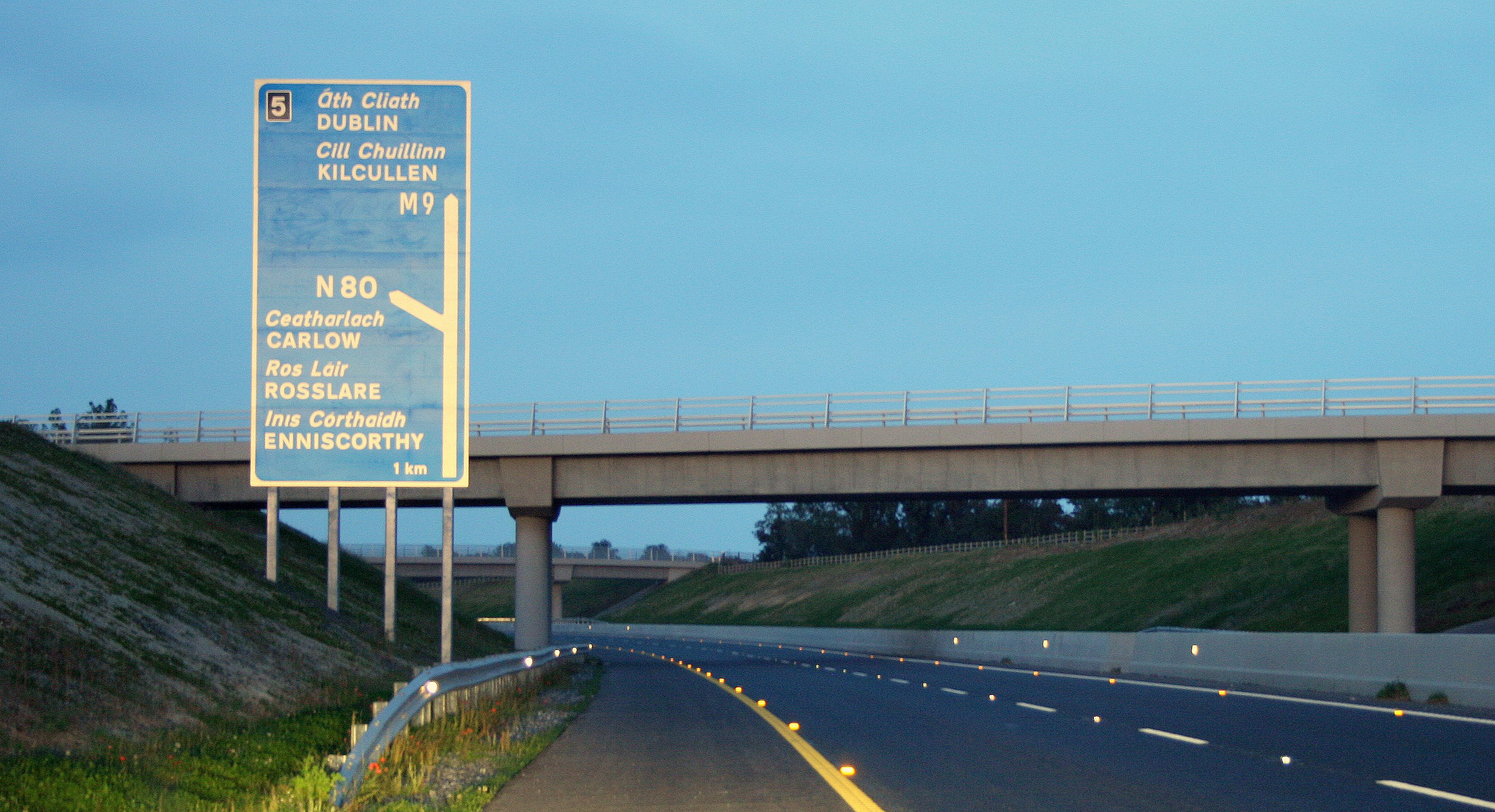
Carlow bypass/N80 junction

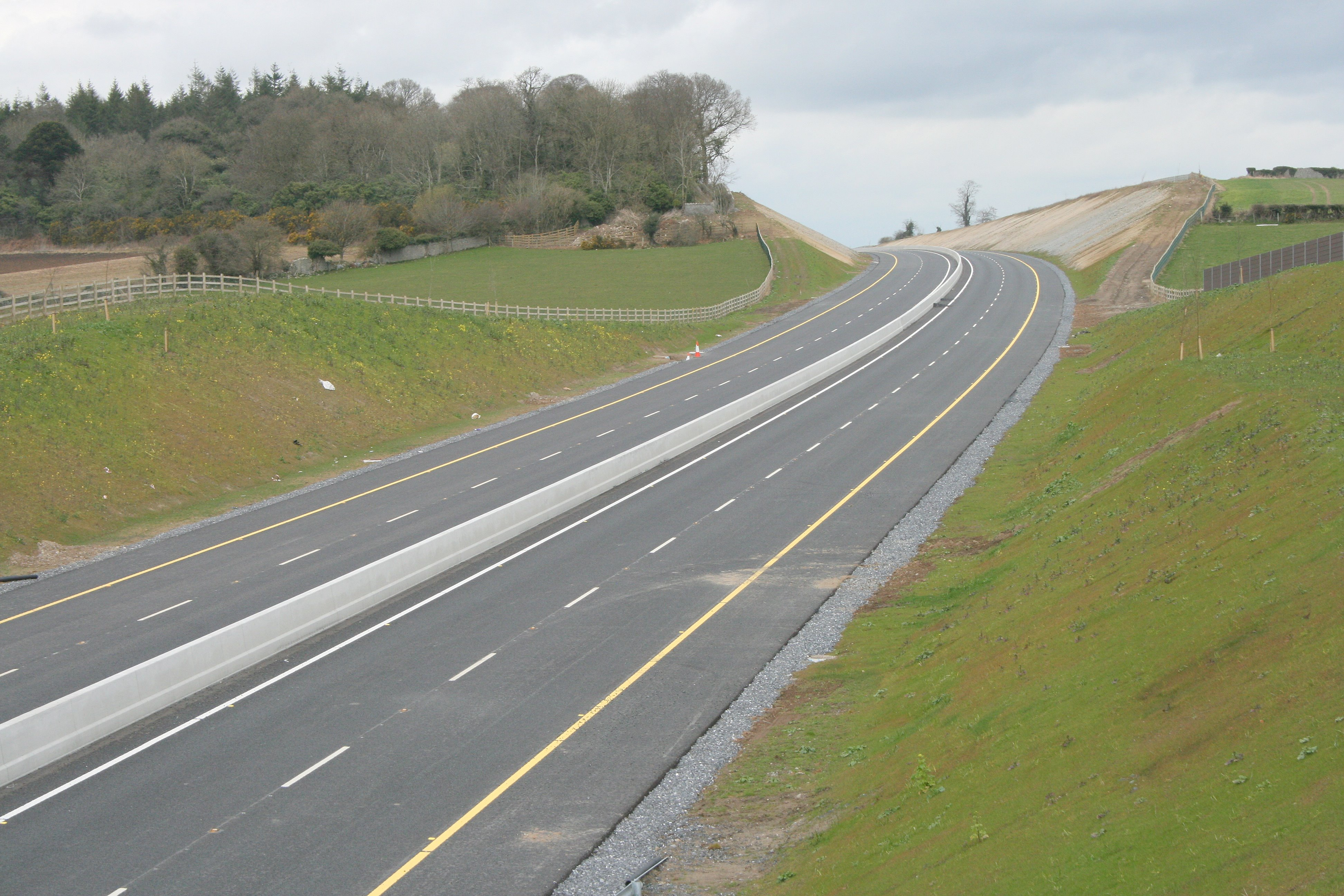
M9 Carlow bypass under construction in March 2008

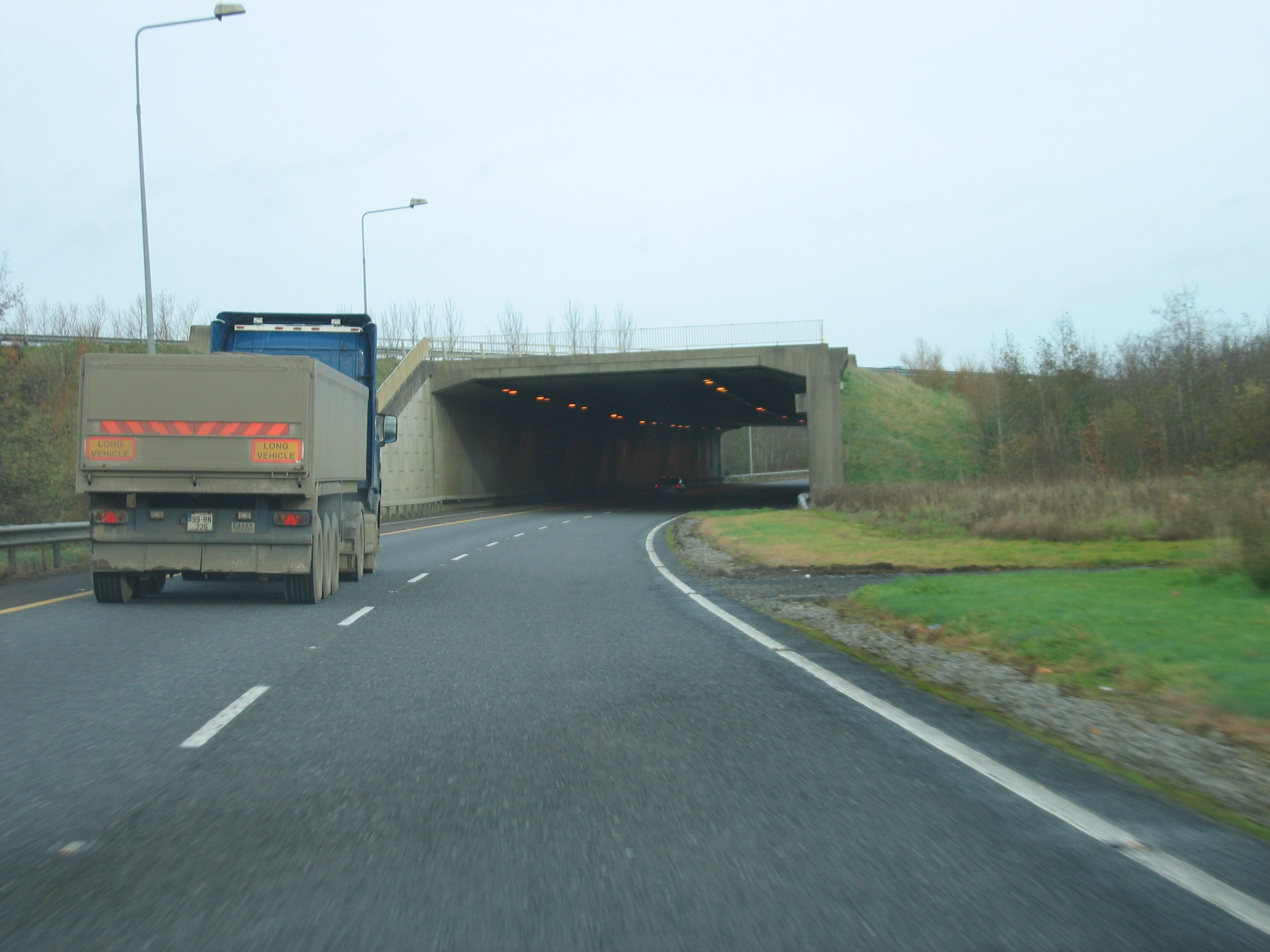
M9 northbound passes under the M7 and merges

| County | km | mi | Junction | Destinations | Notes |
|---|---|---|---|---|---|
| County Kildare | 7 | 4.3 | 2 | R448 – Kilcullen, Newbridge, The Curragh (northbound); Kilcullen, R418 – Kilmead (southbound) | Continues to join M7. |
| County Kildare | 10.5 | 6.5 | Kilcullen Service Area | | |
| County Kildare | 22.5 | 14 | 3 | N78 – Athy, R747 – Baltinglass, Moone, Timolin (northbound); Castlecomer, Athy, Baltinglass, Ballitore (southbound) | |
| County Kildare | 35 | 21.7 | 4 | R448 ‒ Carlow (North), Castledermot, Tullow | |
| County Carlow | 46.5 | 28.9 | 5 | N80 – Carlow, Rosslare, Enniscorthy | Bunclody; Carlow Service Area |
| County Carlow | 53 | 32.9 | 6 | R448 – Carlow, Leighlinbridge (northbound); Carlow, Bagenalstown, Leighlinbridge (southbound) | |
| County Kilkenny | 65 | 40.4 | 7 | R448 – Leighlinbridge, Bagenalstown, Paulstown (northbound); Thomastown, Gowran, Paulstown (southbound) | Paulstown Service Area |
| County Kilkenny | 74 | 46 | 8 | N10 – Kilkenny, Durrow (northbound); Kilkenny (southbound) | |
| County Kilkenny | 83.5 | 51.9 | 9 | N10 – Kilkenny, Bennettsbridge (northbound); Kilkenny, R713 – Stoneyford, Bennettsbridge (southbound) | |
| County Kilkenny | 93.5 | 58.1 | 10 | R699 – Callan, Thomastown, Stoneyford, Knocktopher; Carrick-on-Suir, Callan, Thomastown, Knocktopher (southbound) | |
| County Kilkenny | 108 | 67.1 | 11 | R704 – New Ross, Mullinavat | |
| County Kilkenny | 118.5 | 73.6 | 12 | N24 – Limerick, Clonmel | Junction number not signposted. At-grade roundabout junction. Continues as N9 dual carriageway. |
1.000 mi = 1.609 km; 1.000 km = 0.621 mi: Incomplete access; Tolled; Route transition

=== Motorway Service Areas ===
Transport Infrastructure Ireland (TII) is constructing Motorway Service Areas at approximately 60 kilometre intervals along each of Ireland's interurban routes. Under this plan, the M9 has three such areas. The first is located near the M7/M9 interchange between Junctions 2 and 3. The second is located on the outskirts of Carlow, at junction 5. The third is located south of Carlow near Paulstown, at Junction 7. The (see here, p. 25). The EIS for the M9 Kilcullen Motorway Service Area is available at the TII website (scroll down to the bottom here).

On 1 August 2013, a planning application for a Motorway Service Area was lodged with Kilkenny County Council. This service area is currently located just off Junction 7 Paulstown. Planning permission for the services area was granted on 25 September 2013. It includes a vehicle fuelling station, HGV fuelling station, shop and two restaurants/drive through. There are 119 car parking spaces as well as 12 HGV parking spaces.

In April 2014 construction began on a bridge and access roads to a service area close to Junction 2 near Kilcullen and was completed in early 2015. The filling station, shop and restaurant were officially opened on 24 October 2019.

== Incidents ==
On 16 August 2026, five teenagers were killed after driving a car in the wrong direction on the motorway. Their car collided with another car carrying three women and a seven-year-old boy, all of whom were left in critical condition.
