= Bagenalstown =

Town in County Carlow, Ireland

Bagenalstown Muine Bheag
- Town
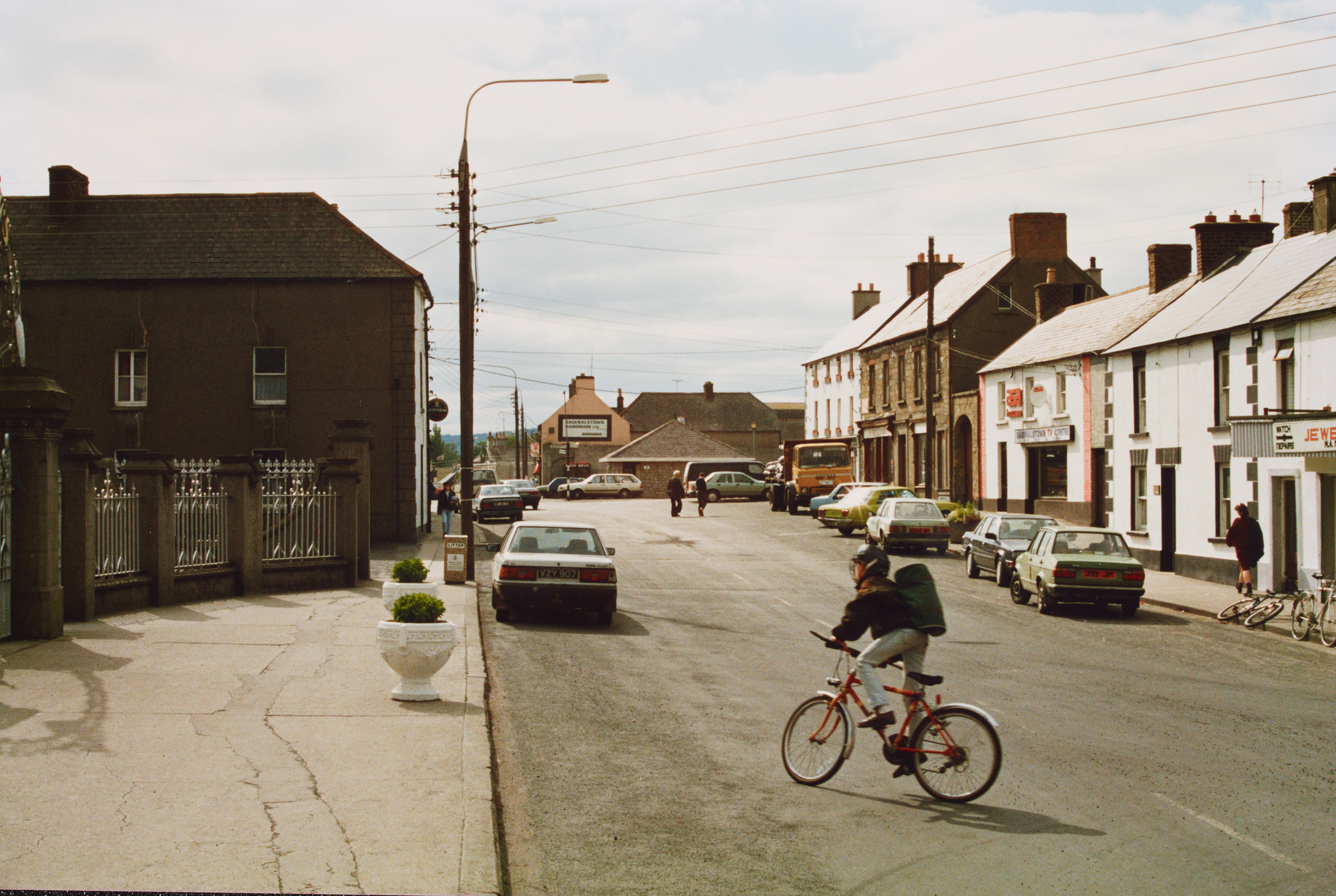
- Market Square, Bagenalstown (1991)

- Coat of arms
- Mottoes: Uimhir gan choisc "The Irrepressible Number"
- Location in Ireland
- Coordinates: 52.701°N 6.957°W
- Country: Ireland
- Province: Leinster
- County: County Carlow
- Elevation: 40 m (130 ft)

Population (2022)
  - Total: 2,945
- Time zone: UTC±0 (WET)
  - Summer (DST): UTC+1 (IST)
- Eircode routing key: R21
- Telephone area code: +353(0)59
- Irish Grid Reference: S683609

Bagenalstown (/ˈbæɡnəlztaʊn/ BAG-nəlz-town), officially named Muine Bheag (Irish: [ˌmˠɪnʲə ˈvʲaɡ]), is a small town on the River Barrow in County Carlow, Ireland.

== History and name ==
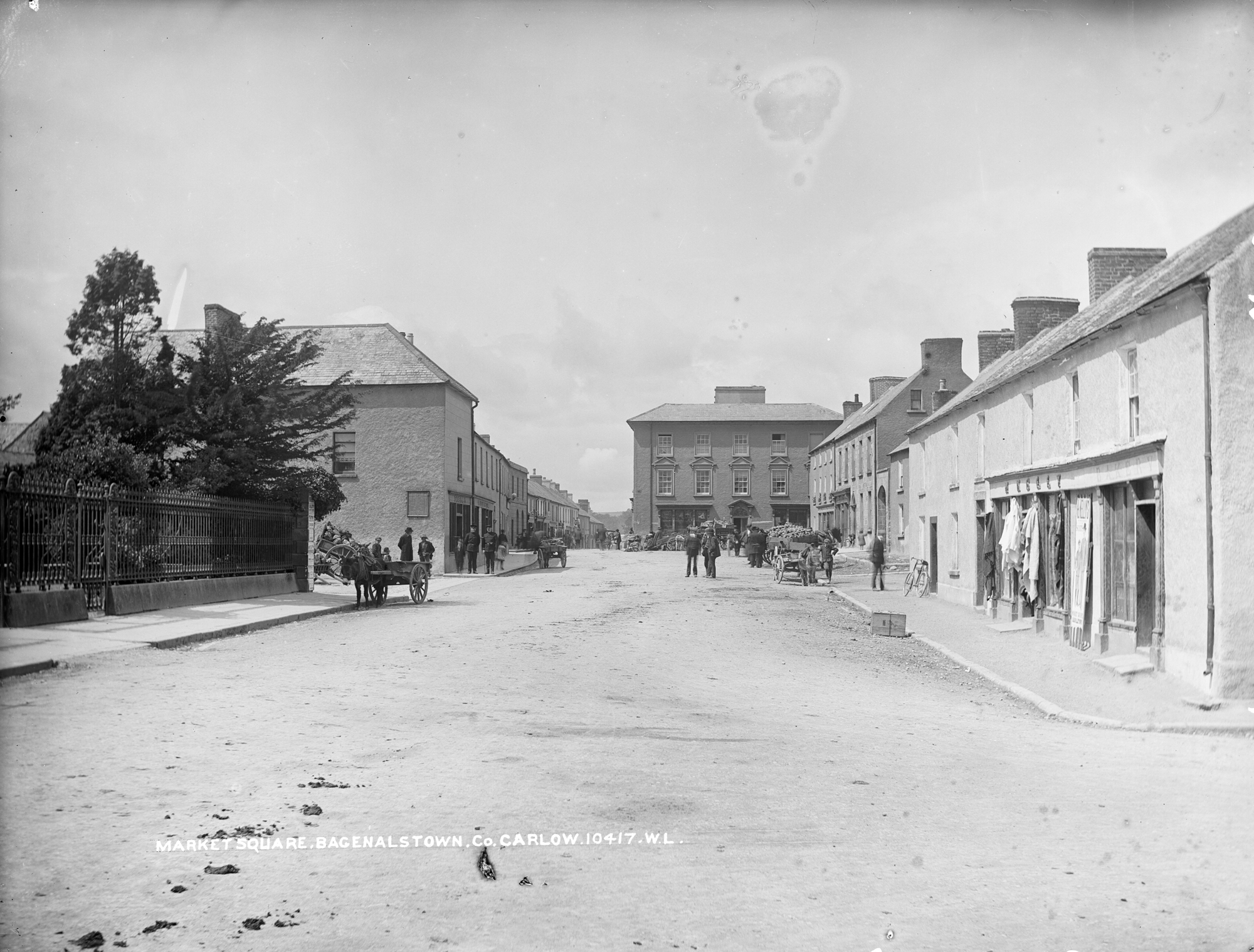
The Market Square in the late 19th century

In the eighth century, Saint Lappan reputedly founded a monastic school outside Bagenalstown in the townland of Donore. He is the patron saint of Bagenalstown.

The town grew within the townland of Moneybeg (Irish: Muine Bheag, "small thicket"). In the 18th century there was a small hamlet there. Walter Bagenal decided to build a town on the site, to be named "New Versailles" and modelled after Versailles in France. However, shortly after building began, the coach route from Dublin, which had passed the location, was changed so it crossed the River Barrow a few kilometres away, at Leighlinbridge, instead. Bagenal abandoned his plans, having built only a courthouse. It was not until the arrival of the railway in 1846 that the settlement began to grow into a town.

In 1911 the town became the first in Ireland to install dual-language street signs, which remain in place today. Following the creation of the Irish Free State in 1922, the town commissioners chose to drop the English name "Bagenalstown" in favour of the Irish Muine Bheag. Several other places in Ireland were renamed around this time. The decision proved an ineffective one, and "Bagenalstown" remained in common use among locals. In a 1975 plebiscite, 77% of residents who voted opted to change the name back, but the proposal failed due to insufficient turnout.

The town's coat of arms, granted in 1999, shows a lattice of blackthorn branches on a gold field, above a field of ermine. The gold and ermine reference the arms of the Bagenal family (as well as the arms of County Carlow), while the blackthorn lattice references the town's Irish name. A wavy fess bisects the shield, representing the River Barrow. The motto is uimhir gan choisc or "the irrepressible number". This is an ancient name for the number nine, referring to its unique mathematical properties (any multiple of nine will have nine as its digital root), and was chosen because the town commission has nine members.

=== Historic industry and town function ===
Bagenalstown's history is strongly associated with the milling industry. Rudkin's Mill marked the start of this industry. It was erected by Henry Rudkin between the end of the 17th century and the start of the 18th century. Shortly after the opening of Rudkin's Mill another mill was opened by Owen Murphy; this would be more commonly known as Lodge Mills.

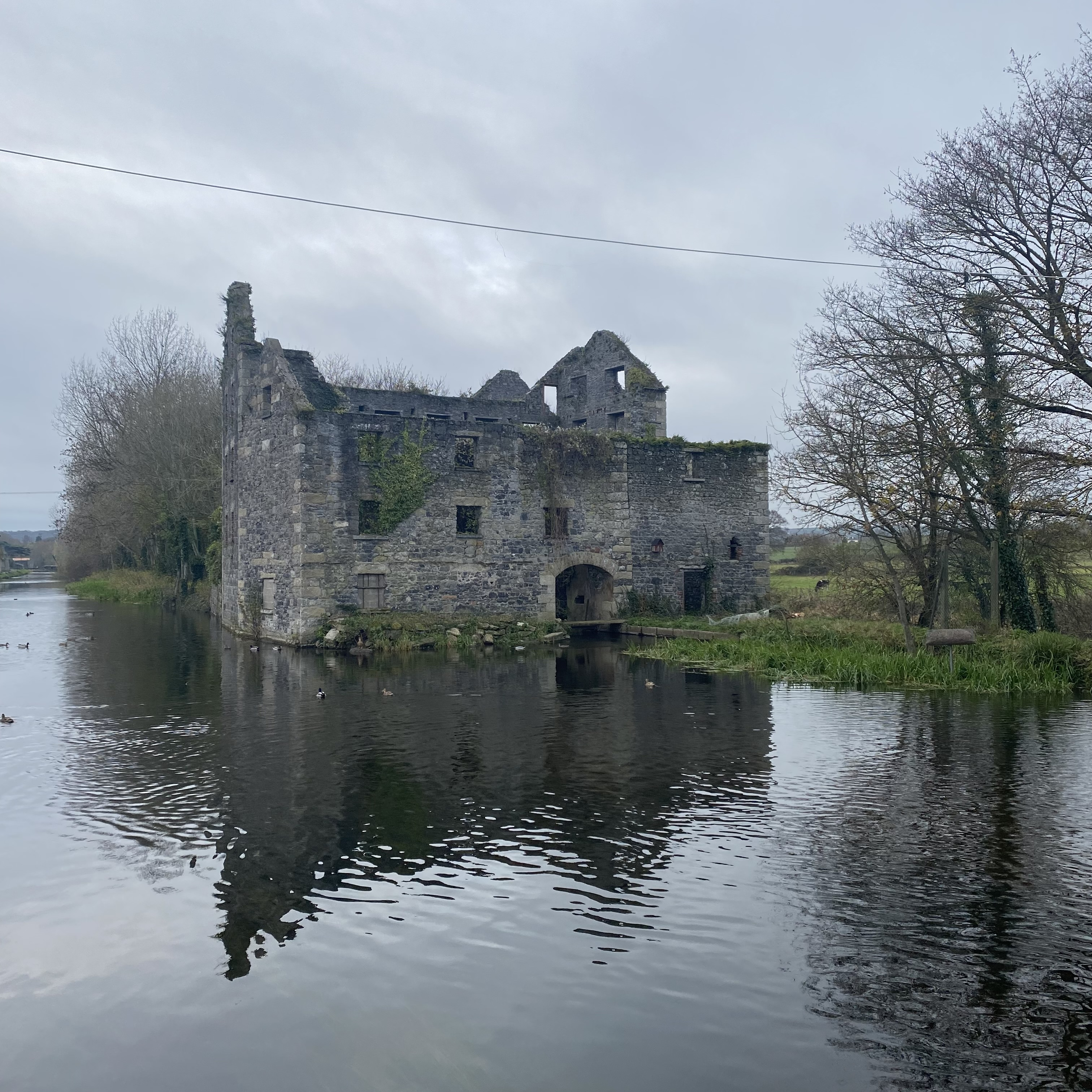
Rudkin's Mill

In 1792 the Barrow Navigation Company began their plan to link the town and river to the Grand Canal. The construction of the canal allowed boats of up to 40 tonnes to transport goods directly to Dublin. In 1845, record numbers were recorded as 111,225 passengers and 286,601 tonnes of goods were transported along this route. Many of the boats that were used for transporting goods on this canal were owned by corn buyers and maltsters. This allowed them to efficiently transport the goods they needed direct from Rudkin's Mill and Lodge Mill.

Bagenalstown very quickly transitioned into a highly prosperous town, and became recognised as a post, boat, mill and marketplace hub. The tradition of milling was also joined by salt and gas works in the 18th and 19th centuries. The canal route very quickly declined once the railway had been introduced and in 1852, only a small number of trading boats remained on this river. As of 2018, the canal was only used as a tourist attraction.

In 1982 a mile north of Bagenalstown a mechanical excavator was used to dig the foundations of a silo and struck a large granite boulder which proved to be a capstone of a cist burial dated from the Bronze Age.

== Transport ==
Bagenalstown is at the junction of the R705 which leads to New Ross via Graiguenamanagh and Goresbridge and the R724. It lies on the eastern side of the R448 which links it to Carlow and the M9 to Dublin. Southbound the R448 leads to Paulstown, Gowran and the M9 leading to Waterford and Kilkenny.

The town is served by Muine Bheag railway station on the Dublin–Waterford line, part of the Iarnród Éireann network. This connects the town to nearby Carlow, as well as Kilkenny to the southwest. The station was opened on 24 July 1848 as Bagnalstown and was renamed Bagenalstown by April 1910. The station building was designed and constructed using limestone and granite and the design had been attributed to William Deane Butler. It was permanently closed to passengers on 30 March 1963 and for goods traffic on 6 September 1976. The station was reopened and officially renamed "Muine Bheag" in 1988 although Bagenalstown is recognised as its common name on the bilingual nameboards, in place since 2015, and on the Iarnród Éireann website. The station to this day remains largely untouched, with its original features still present.

The town is on the River Barrow which was made navigable from the Grand Canal upstream at Athy starting in 1792, all the way to Waterford downstream.

== Places of interest ==
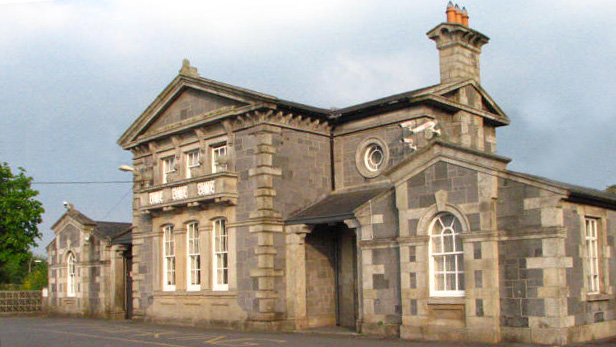
Bagenalstown railway station

Near Bagenalstown is Ballyloughan Castle, which comprises a twin-towered gatehouse and the hall and foundations of one of the corner towers of a large castle dating from about 1300.

Ballymoon Castle is 3 km (2 mi) east of Bagenalstown, and is thought to date from the 13th century.

One of the best views of Bagenalstown can be seen from the Leighlinbridge road. This view includes the spire of St Andrews Catholic Church and the tower of St Mary's Church of Ireland Church. St Andrews church was built in the 1820s on a site provided by the Newton family, successors of the Bagenals.

== Community groups ==
The 1st Bagenalstown BP Scout Group was set up in 2009 and meets in the McGrath hall. Their activities include hiking, camping, kayaking and games.

Bagenalstown hosts a floral festival every August.

== Sport ==
Bagenalstown has had a long tradition in cricket. The Bagenalstown Cricket Club was first formed in 1843 by the local millers, and is still in use. The club's logo is a grinding wheel, which was used in early milling. Muine Bheag is the local GAA club, formed in 2018 after the amalgamation of three former clubs.

There is a river-side outdoor swimming pool on the approach road to the town from Leighlinbridge. The McGrath complex offers sporting facilities such as hurling, cricket, soccer and Gaelic football fields, tennis courts, and pitch-and-putt courses.

The racehorse Danoli, described in 1995 as "the most popular racehorse in Ireland" was trained near the town by Thomas Foley.

== Education ==
Bagenalstown has three primary schools and two secondary schools:

- Queen of the Universe National School, founded by Bishop Keogh in 1957, is a primary school for boys (junior infants to 1st class) and girls.
- St Brigid's National School, founded in 1865, is a primary school for boys only from classes 2nd to 6th.
- St Mary's National School is a co-educational school under Church of Ireland patronage.
- Presentation De La Salle College is a secondary school, established in 1983. This Catholic College is under the trusteeship of the De La Salle Brothers, the Presentation Sisters and Bagenalstown Parish.
- Muine Bheag Vocational School is a secondary school, opened in 1963.

== International relations ==
The town was twinned with the town of Pont-Péan, Brittany in 1999. The twinning charter, which is written in Irish, English and French, commits the two towns to "developing social, economic, cultural, touristic, and sporting links" between the two communities.

== Notable people ==
- Beauchamp Bagenal (1741–1802), rake, duellist and reputedly "the handsomest man in Europe"
- Seán Drea, World Rowing Championship silver medalist, Olympian and world record-breaking sculler
- Richie Kavanagh, entertainer, musician
- John Lucas, soldier who won a Victoria Cross during the Taranaki Maori War in New Zealand in 1861

== See also ==
- List of towns and villages in Ireland
