= Paulstown =

Village in County Kilkenny, Ireland

Paulstown Irish: Baile Phóil
- Village
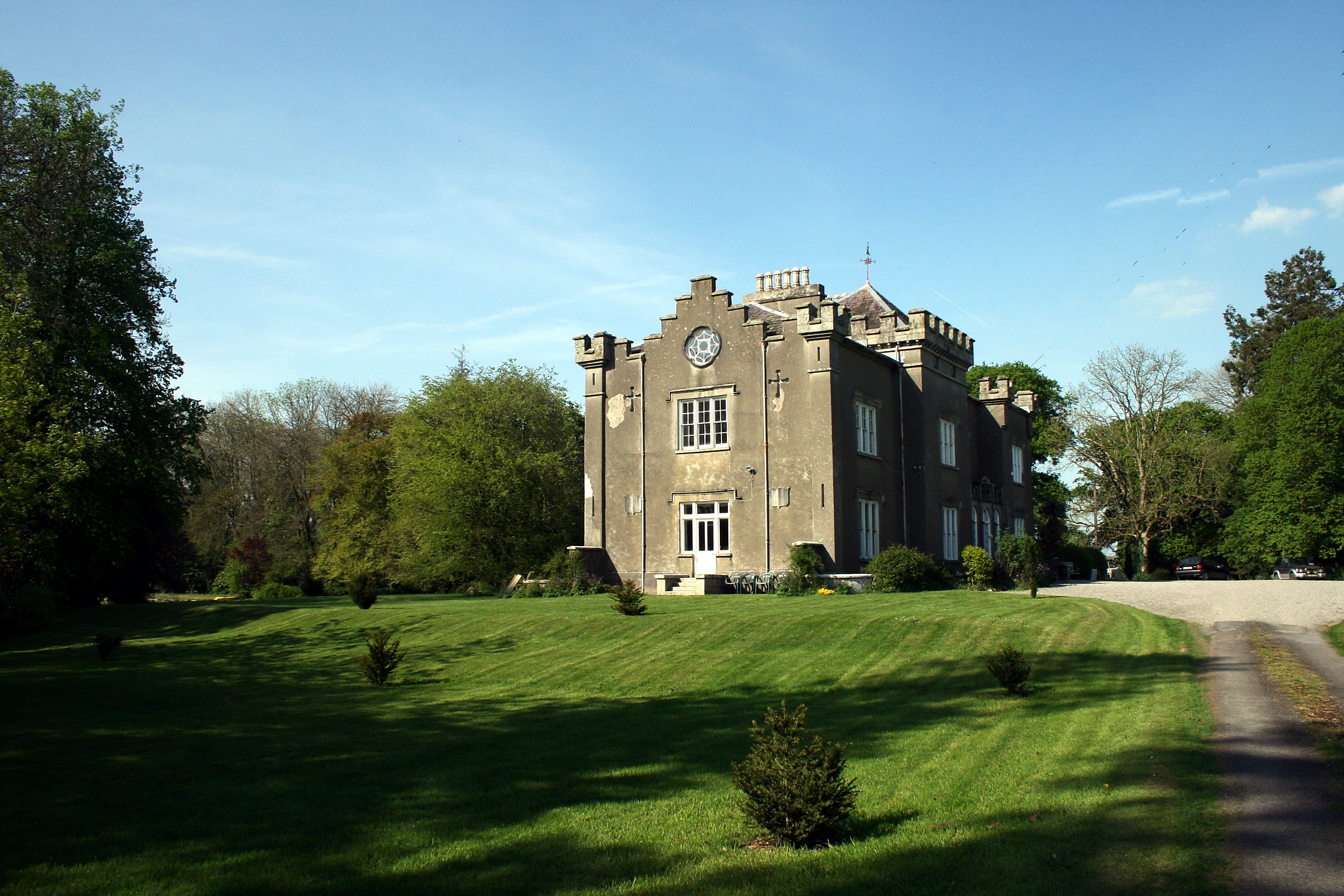
- Shankill Castle, Paulstown

- Location in Ireland
- Coordinates: 52°41′00″N 7°01′00″W
- Country: Ireland
- Province: Leinster
- County: County Kilkenny
- Time zone: UTC+0 (WET)
  - Summer (DST): UTC-1 (IST (WEST))
- Website: www.kilkennycoco.ie

Paulstown (Irish: Baile Phóil) (also known as Poulstown or Polestown) is a small village in County Kilkenny in Ireland.

Paulstown is located at the (northern) junction of the N9 and N10 National primary roads. It is 21 km south of Carlow and 19 km east of Kilkenny.

Scoil Bhride is the primary school in Paulstown. Shankill Gardens & Castle is a point of interest.

Paulstown parish is in the Roman Catholic Diocese of Kildare and Leighlin. The 200-year-old Church of the Assumption is the local Catholic church in the parish of Muinebheag/Bagenalstown.

== Scoil Bhride ==
The village's primary school is Scoil Bhride Paulstown. It is a mixed school with about 109 boys and 90 girls. The principal is Brian Healy. Scoil Bhride has registered for the Green Schools Programme.

== Paulstown Castle ==
Paulstown Castle is a detached three-bay four-stage 'tower house' country house, rebuilt 1828, retaining fabric of earlier house, 1710, possibly incorporating fabric of medieval castle, c.1450. It was in use until 1902 but vacated pre-1973. It is now in ruins.

Paulstown Castle represents one of the elements of the architectural heritage of County Kilkenny. A middle-size house of distinctive appearance reputedly built to designs prepared by William Robertson (1770–1850). The house remains of additional importance for the historic associations with the Flood family of nearby View Mount House, the Healy family, and for the reputed connections with Sir Pearse Butler.

== Shankill Castle ==
Shankill Castle and Gardens is set in parkland on the border between County Carlow and County Kilkenny. Visitors can walk in the grounds and gardens, and there are guided tours of the house.

Shankill Castle started as a Butler tower-house near the ruins of an old church. Peter Aylward bought the lands from his wife's family in 1708, and it was rebuilt and set in a formal landscape with a vista to the front and canal to the rear. In the 19th century, it was enlarged and castellated, serpentine bays were added to the canal, and an unusual polyhedral sundial was given pride of place on a sunken lawn. Other additions were a gothic porch bearing the Aylward crest and a conservatory. The stable yard and the castellated entrance to the demesne are attributed to Daniel Robertson.

== Environment ==
In Paulstown, there are 3 significant trees which are included in the Tree Register of Ireland, compiled by the Tree Council of Ireland. These include a Common Lime, a Wellingtonia Giant Sequoia and two Monterey Cypress around Shankill Castle Gardens .

== Transport ==
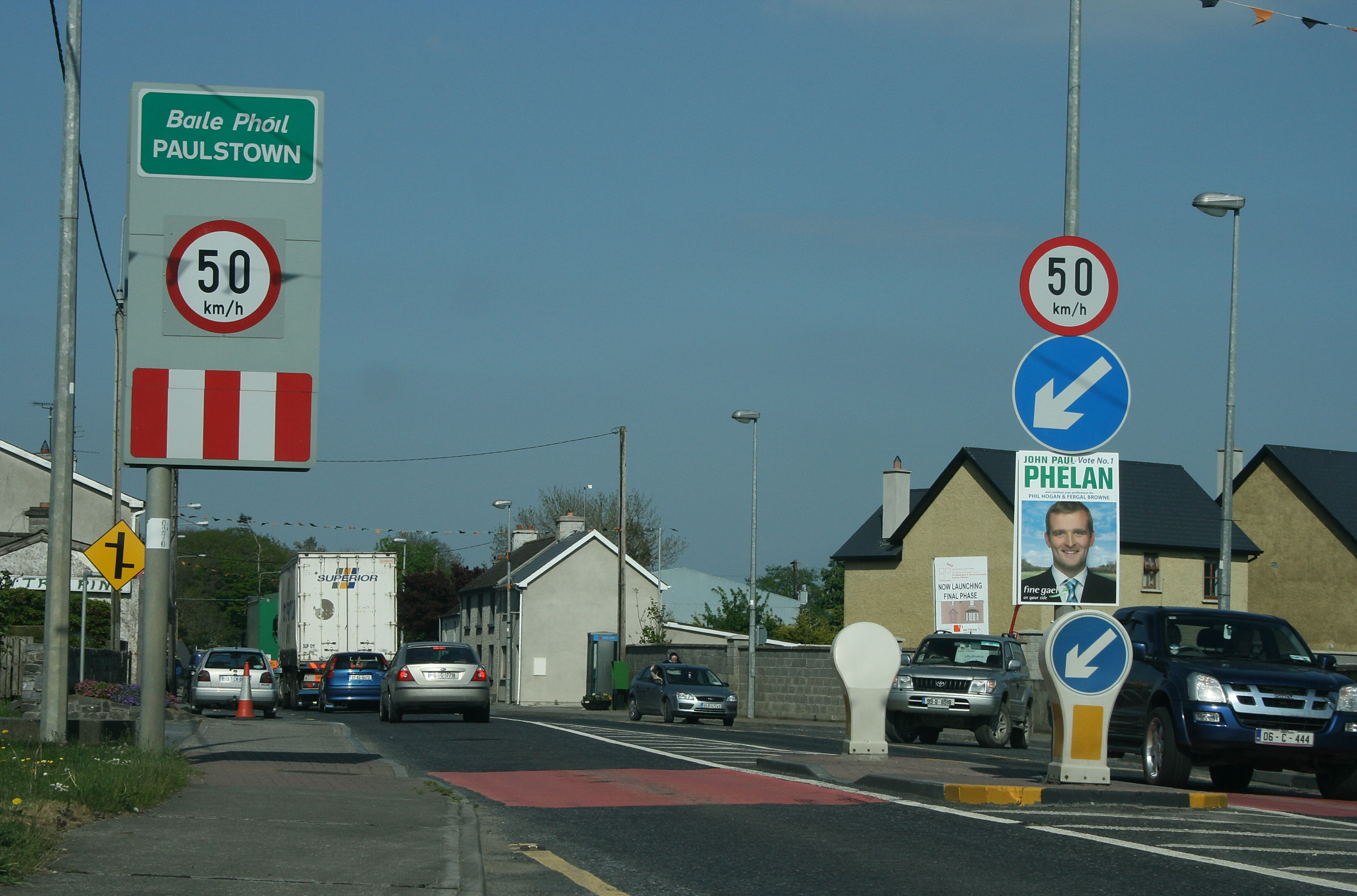
R712 at Paulstown, County Kilkenny

The former N9 - R448 road passes through Gowran, Dungarvan, Thomastown, and further on, just north of Ballyhale the former N10 rejoins the former N9, having proceeded south from Kilkenny. At Paulstown, the former N10 diverges west/southwest to serve Kilkenny, proceeding southwest to Coolgrange, and west to the outskirts of Kilkenny, where it meets the Kilkenny Ring Road at a roundabout.

== See also ==
- List of towns and villages in Ireland
