= R712 road =

R712 road may refer to:

- R712 road (Ireland)
- R712 road (South Africa)
