= R703 road =

R703 road may refer to:

- R703 road (Ireland)
- R703 (South Africa)
