= Ballymurphy =

Ballymurphy may refer to:

== Northern Ireland ==
- Ballymurphy, Belfast, known for the Ballymurphy massacre
- Ballymurphy, County Antrim
- Ballymurphy, County Down
- Ballymurphy, County Tyrone

== Republic of Ireland ==
- Ballymurphy, County Carlow
- Ballymurphy, County Clare
