= R700 road (Ireland) =

Road in Ireland

R700 road
- Bóthar R700
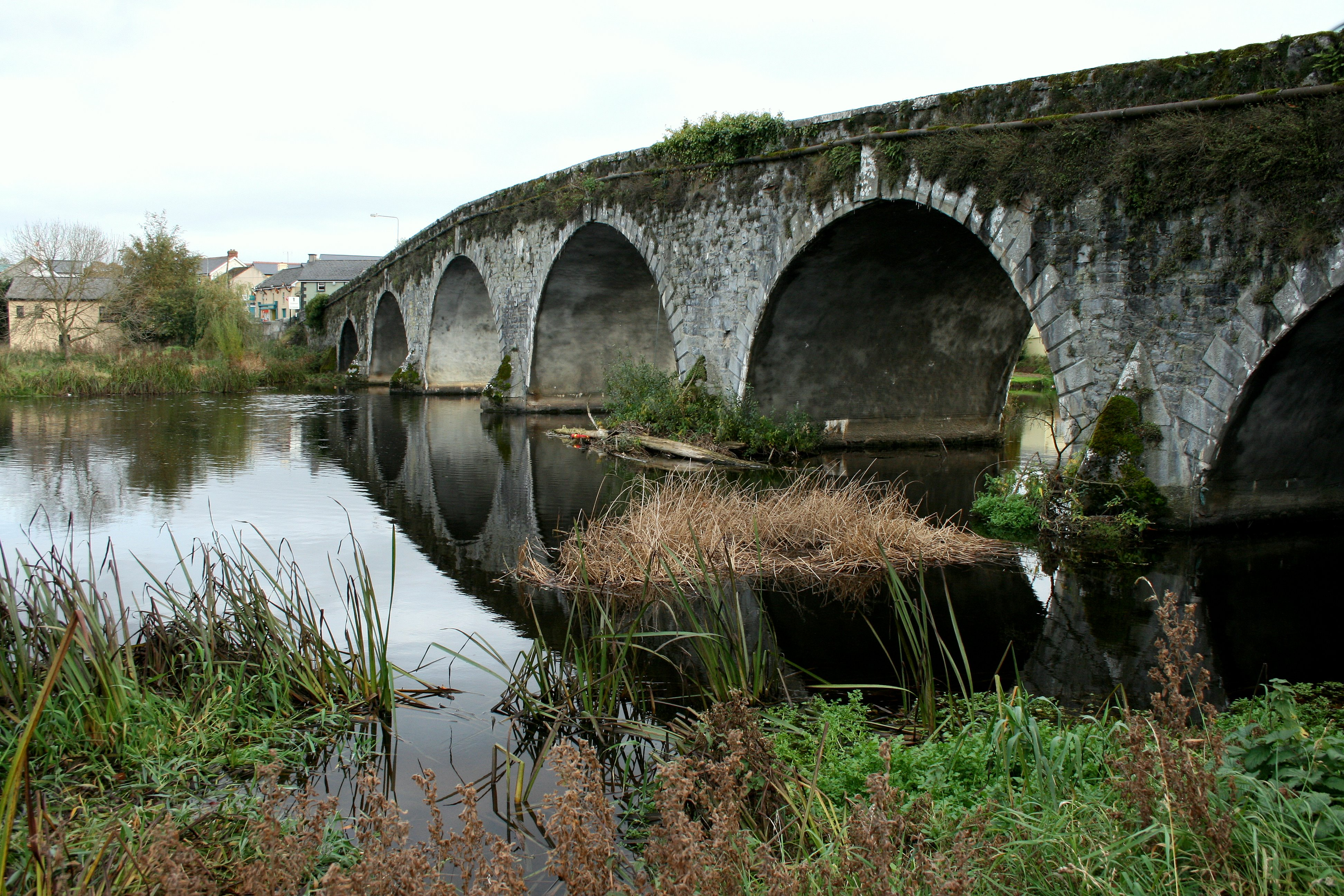
- R700 over the River Nore at Bennettsbridge

Route information
- Length: 42 km (26 mi)

Location
- Country: Ireland
- Primary destinations: County Kilkenny; Kilkenny leave the city centre and cross the N10 (Southern ring road); Bennettsbridge – crosses the River Nore; Crosses the Kilkenny–Waterford railway line; Join/leave R702 nr Borris; Thomastown – (R448, R703); Crosses the River Nore; Inistioge – Crosses the River Nore; (R705); Crosses the River Barrow; County Wexford; Joins/leaves the N30; New Ross – terminates at the R723

Highway system
- Roads in Ireland; Motorways; Primary; Secondary; Regional

The R700 road is a regional road in Ireland which runs northwest–southeast from Kilkenny city centre to New Ross in County Wexford.

En route it passes through Bennettsbridge, Thomastown and Inistioge before crossing the River Barrow into County Wexford. It terminates in New Ross via Craywell Road, John Street, Bridge Street, (and via Quay Street and North Street) at a junction with the R723 at O'Hanrahan Bridge in the town centre.

The route is 42 km (26 mi) long.

== See also ==
- Roads in Ireland
- National primary road
- National secondary road
