= R700 road =

R700 road may refer to:

- R700 road (Ireland)
- R700 (South Africa)
