= R705 road (Ireland) =

Road in Ireland

R705 road
- Bóthar R705
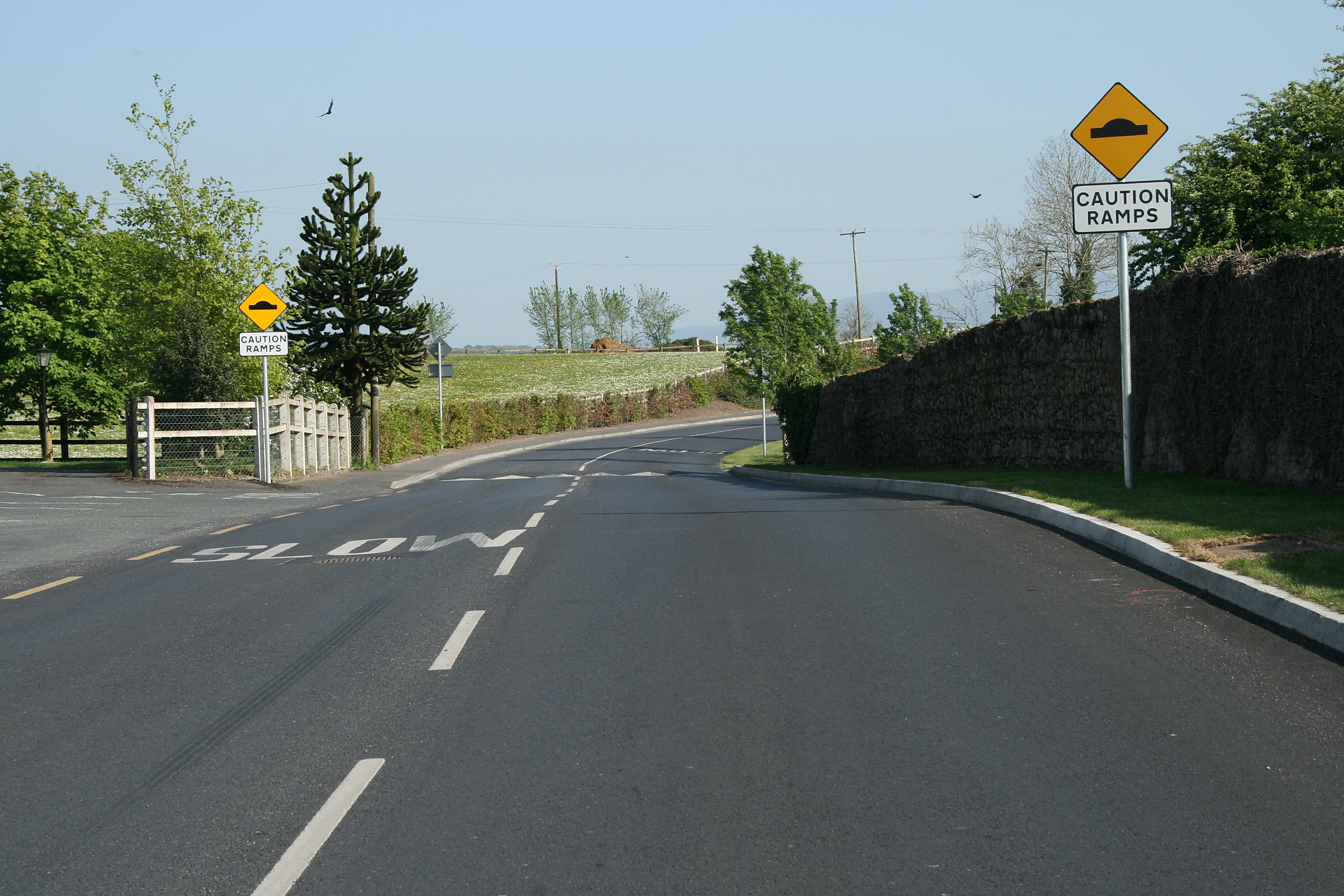
- R705 leaving Leighlinbridge heading south

Route information
- Length: 41 km (25 mi)

Location
- Country: Ireland
- Primary destinations: County Carlow; Leighlinbridge leave the R448; Bagenalstown – (R724); Join/leave R702 nr Borris; Crosses the River Barrow; County Kilkenny; Graiguenamanagh join/leave R703; Ballinvarry; The Rower; Terminates at the R700

Highway system
- Roads in Ireland; Motorways; Primary; Secondary; Regional

The R705 road is a regional road in Ireland which runs north-south from the R448 at Leighlinbridge in County Carlow and through Bagenalstown before crossing into County Kilkenny. It continues to Graiguenamanagh, passes Brandon Hill (516 m (1,693 ft)) and continues south along the western side of the valley of the River Barrow until it terminates at a junction with the R700.

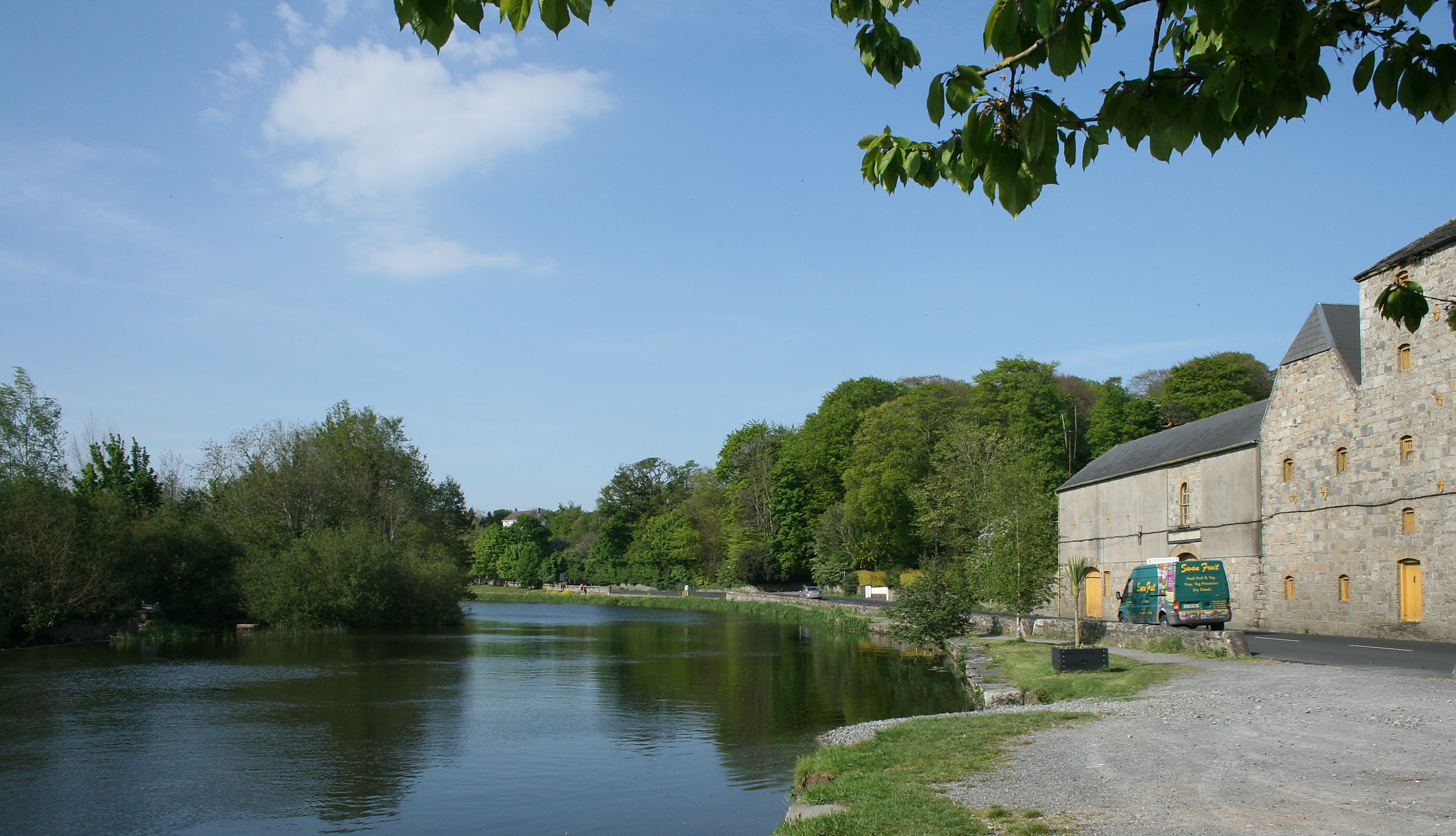
R705 along the River Barrow near Bagenalstown

The route is 41 km (25 mi) long.

== See also ==
- Roads in Ireland
- National primary road
- National secondary road
