= R712 road (Ireland) =

Road in Ireland

Coordinates: 52.645046°N 7.203917°W

R712 road
- Bóthar R712
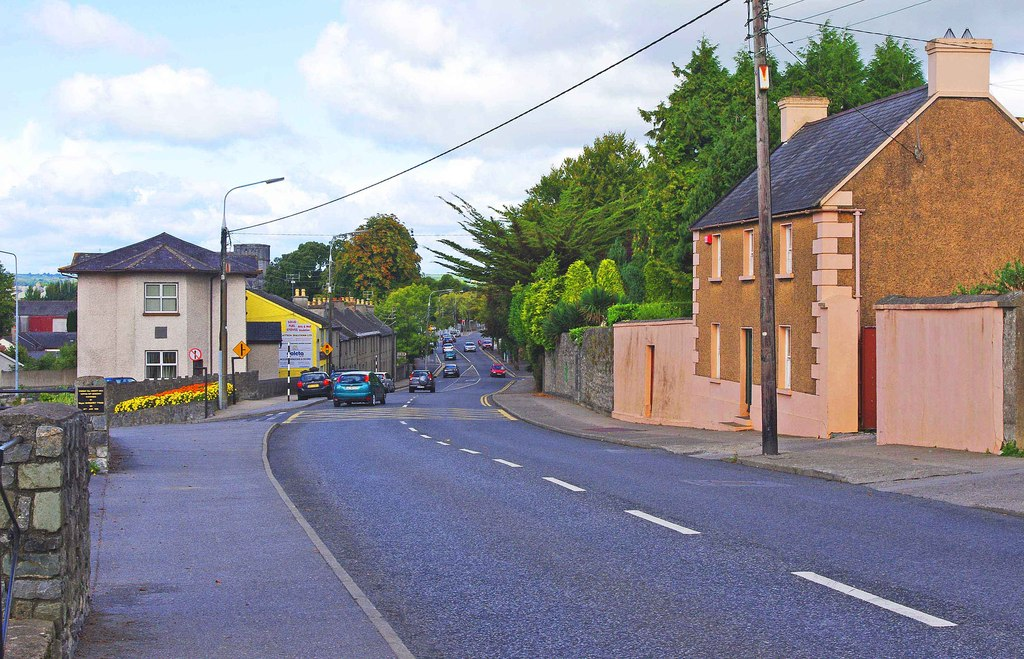
- Dublin Road, Kilkenny, on the R712

Route information
- Length: 19.9 km (12.4 mi)

Major junctions
- From: N77 Kilkenny
- R702 Coolgrange; Crosses Gowran River, Monofelin River, Ballywalden River
- To: R448 Paulstown

Location
- Country: Ireland

Highway system
- Roads in Ireland; Motorways; Primary; Secondary; Regional

The R712 road is a short regional road in Ireland, located in County Kilkenny.

The official description of the R712 from the Roads Act 1993 (Classification of Regional Roads) Order 2012 reads:

R712: Kilkenny — Paulstown, County Kilkenny (Part old N10)

Between its junction with N77 at Baun in the county of Kilkenny and its junction with R448 at Paulstown in the county of Kilkenny via Castlecomer Road and Dublin Road in the borough of Kilkenny: Aughmalogue Bridge, Coolgrange and Garryduff Cross in the county of Kilkenny.
