= N10 road (Ireland) =

Road in Ireland

N10 road
- Bóthar N10

Route information
- Length: 17.14 km (10.65 mi)

Location
- Country: Ireland
- Primary destinations: County Kilkenny; junction 8 (M9 from Dublin); (N77 to Durrow); Kilkenny; (R700); (N76 to Clonmel); Danesfort; Terminates at junction 9 (M9 to Waterford)

Highway system
- Roads in Ireland; Motorways; Primary; Secondary; Regional

The N10 road is a national primary road in Ireland, connecting Kilkenny to the M9 Dublin – Waterford route. It consists of a route from northeast of Kilkenny, a ring road around the city, and a route southeast of the city.

== Route ==
As of 2008, the route leaves the M9 at junction 8, proceeding westwards to the outskirts of Kilkenny, where it meets the Kilkenny Ring Road at a roundabout. The newest section of the ring road (opened in 2008) leaves the roundabout northwards as the N77 to Durrow and Port Laoise. The N10 continues along the ring road around the southeast side of the city. At a roundabout junction with the N76 to Clonmel it leaves the ring heading southwards through Stoneyford and Knocktopher. Just north of Ballyhale, the N10 rejoins the M9 at junction 9.

== 2008 upgrade ==
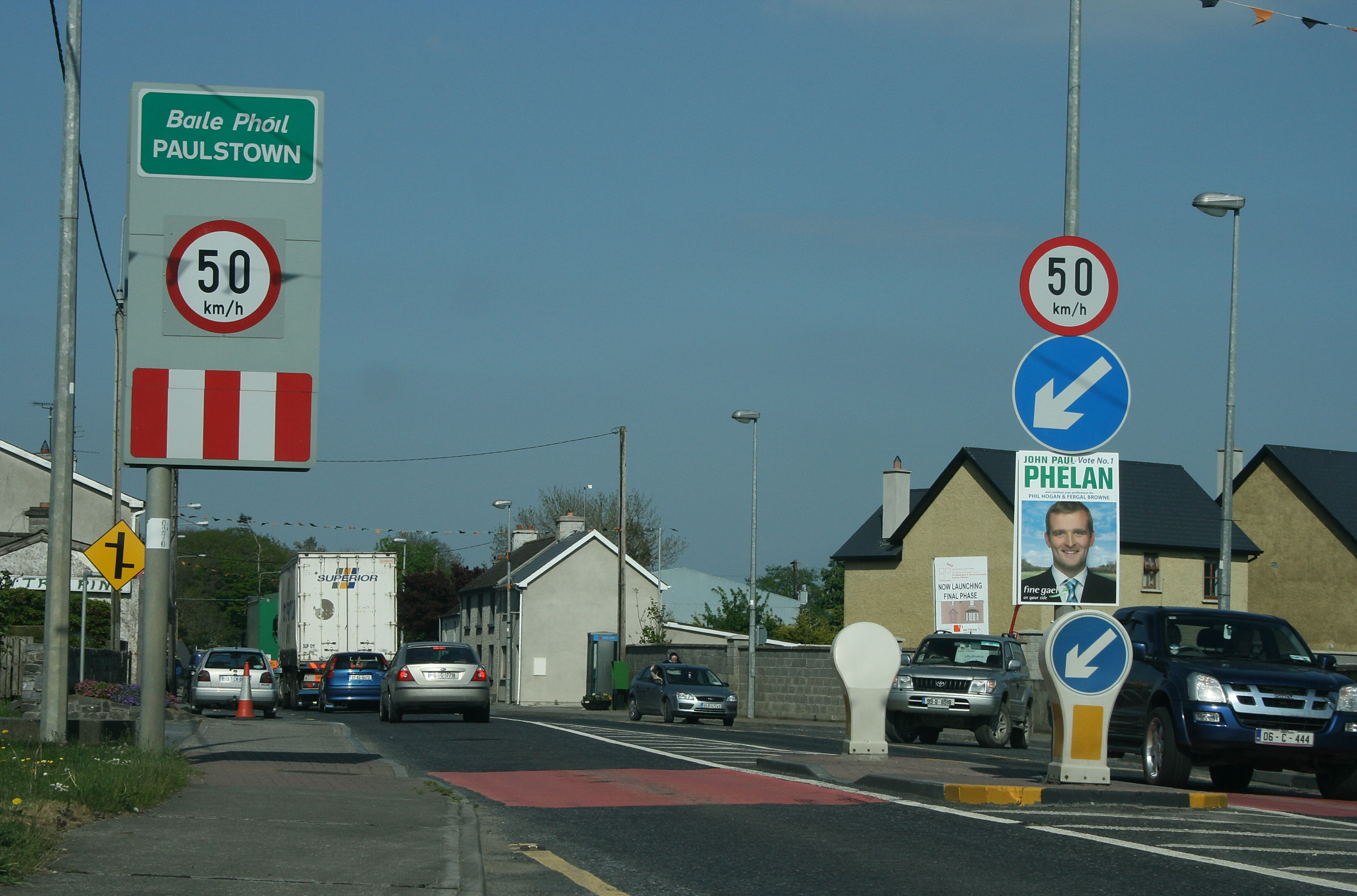
N10 at Paulstown, County Kilkenny, prior to the opening of the M9 motorway. This section of road has since been downgraded to the R712 road

In 2008 construction on the M9 section between Powerscourt and Knocktopher replaced the old N9 road. The motorway links to the N10 at two locations, as the original N9 route did. However, the M9 passes further west, closer to Kilkenny, thus more than halving the length of the original N10 route.

A new greenfield N10 route section was built from near Dunbell (about 10 km (6.2 mi) west of Kilkenny city centre), running northwest and meeting the Kilkenny Ring Road further north than the original connection. The original N10 has been downgraded to the R712 road.

The southern N10 section was made considerably shorter following the upgrade which now terminates at junction 9 near Danesfort (about 12 km (7.5 mi) south of Kilkenny). The remaining section of the original N10 has been downgraded to the R713 road.

== See also ==
- Roads in Ireland
- Motorways in Ireland
- National secondary road
- Regional road
