= R890 road (Ireland) =

Road in Ireland

R890 road
- Bóthar R890

Route information
- Length: 1.5 km (0.93 mi)

Major junctions
- From: R772 (formerly N11)

- To: R702

Location
- Country: Ireland

Highway system
- Roads in Ireland; Motorways; Primary; Secondary; Regional

The R890 road is a regional road in County Wexford, Ireland and runs between Blackstoops Roundabout and Cathedral Street, both in Enniscorthy. It serves as an inner relief road to relieve traffic on the R772 (previously N11) and R702 roads through Enniscorthy town. It is roughly 1.5 km (0.93 miles) long.
