= R703 road (Ireland) =

Road in Ireland

R703 road
- Bóthar R703
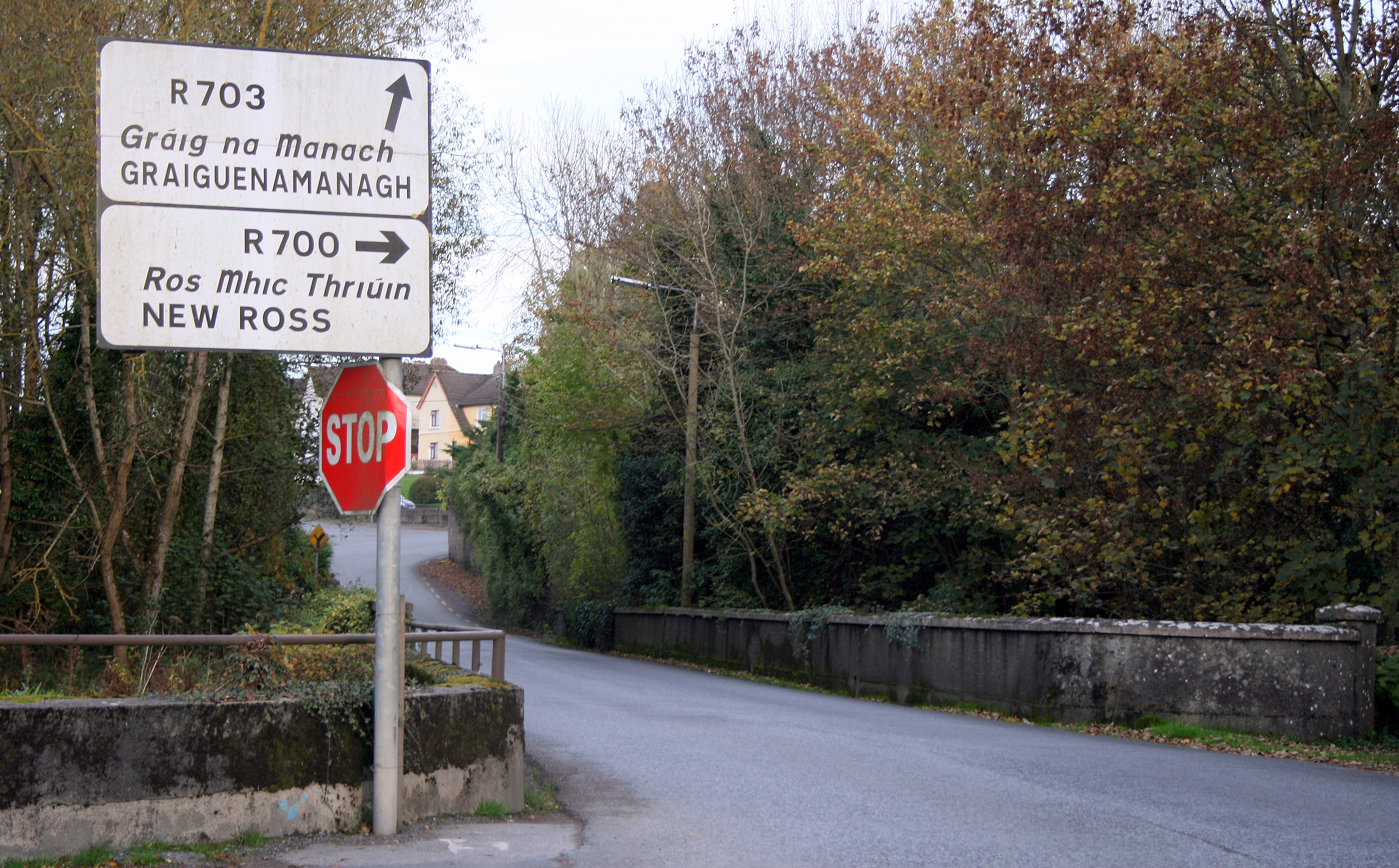
- The R703 starts in Thomastown crossing the River Nore

Route information
- Length: 24 km (15 mi)

Location
- Country: Ireland
- Primary destinations: County Kilkenny; Thomastown leave the R700; Graiguenamanagh – (R705); crosses the River Nore; County Carlow; (R709); Ballymurphy – terminates at the R702

Highway system
- Roads in Ireland; Motorways; Primary; Secondary; Regional

The R703 road is a regional road in Ireland which runs west-east from Thomastown in County Kilkenny through Graiguenamanagh before crossing into County Carlow and terminating at the R702 in Ballymurphy, County Carlow. The route is 24 km (15 mi) long.

== See also ==
- Roads in Ireland
- National primary road
- National secondary road
