= Ballyloughan Castle =

Ruined castle in County Carlow, Ireland

Coordinates: 52.8368°N 6.7738°W

- Caisleán Bhaile an Locháin
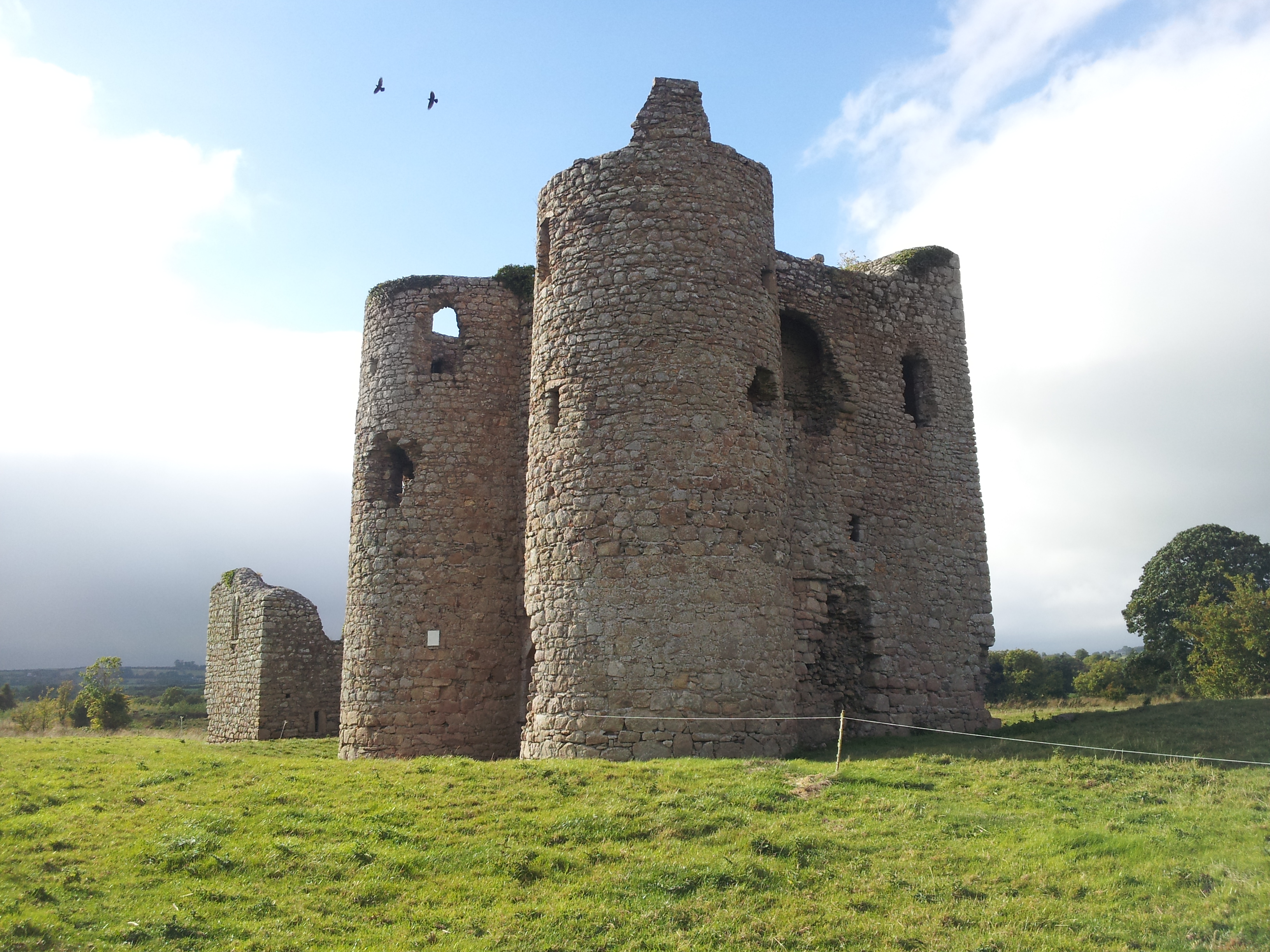
- Exterior of Ballyloughan Castle
- Interactive map of the Ballyloughan Castle area

General information
- Architectural style: Norman
- Location: Bagenalstown, County Carlow, Ireland
- Construction started: c. 1300

National monument of Ireland
- Official name: Ballyloughan Castle
- Reference no.: 351

Ballyloughan Castle is a ruined castle and National Monument near Bagenalstown, County Carlow in Ireland. A twin-towered gatehouse, the hall and foundations of one of the corner towers, dating to about 1300, remain.

== History ==
Ballyloughan is at the western end of a glacial ridge near Mount Leinster. The castle is roughly square in form, and the walls are in places up to 50 ft (15 metres) high and 5 ft thick. Nothing is recorded of the castle's early history, though the majority of its features are typical of 13th century construction.
