= R702 road (Ireland) =

Road in Ireland

R702 road
- Bóthar R702
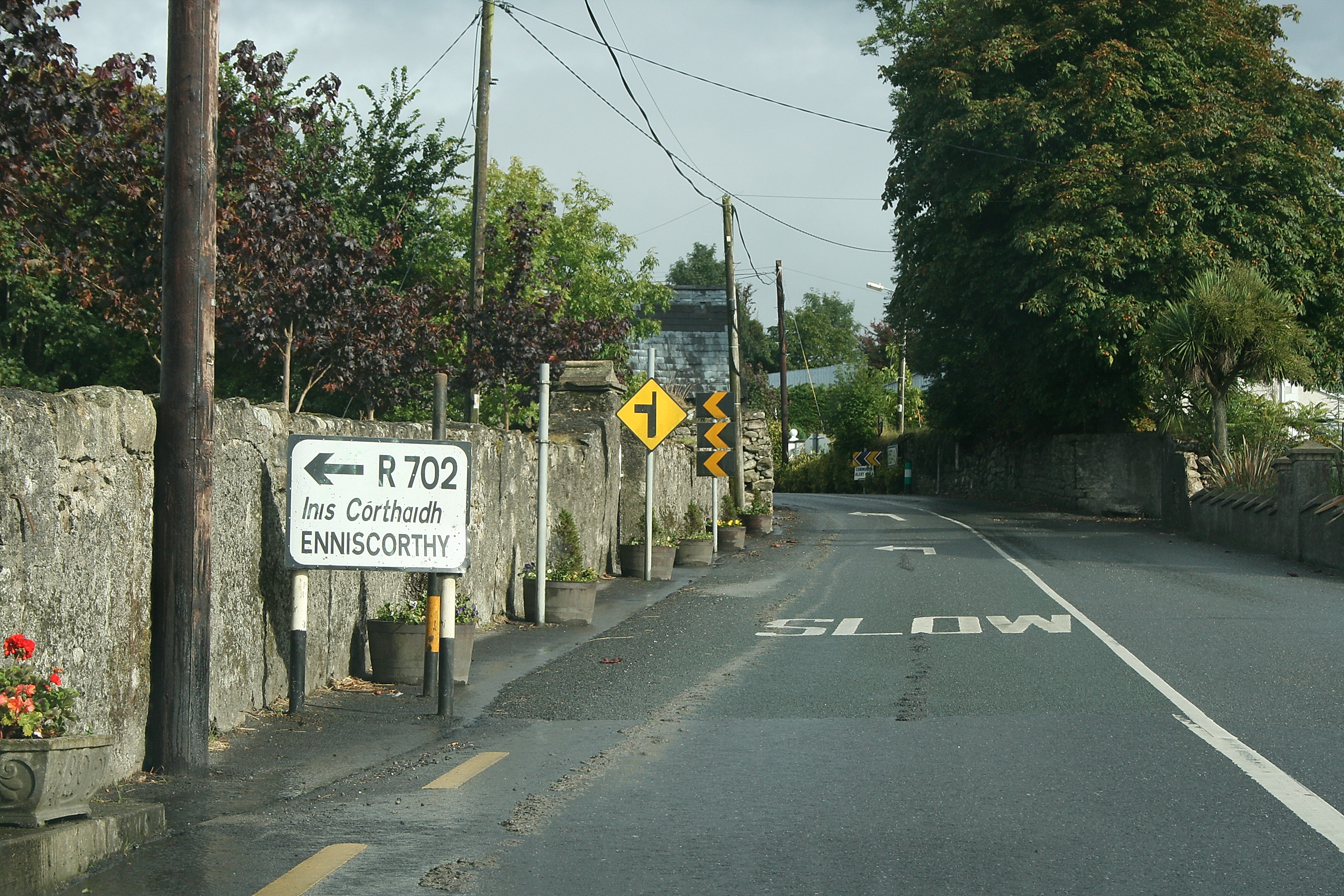
- R702 through Ballymurphy

Route information
- Length: 49 km (30 mi)

Location
- Country: Ireland
- Primary destinations: County Kilkenny; Coolgrange leave the R712; Gowran – joins/leaves the (R448); Goresbridge – crosses the River Barrow; County Carlow; ± R705; Borris; (R729); Ballymurphy – (R703); Scullogue Gap; County Wexford; Kiltealy – (R730); (R746); (R745); (N30); Enniscorthy – terminates at the R890

Highway system
- Roads in Ireland; Motorways; Primary; Secondary; Regional

The R702 road is a regional road in Ireland which runs west-east from the R712 at Coolgrange in County Kilkenny through Gowran before crossing into County Carlow at Goresbridge. It continues to Borris, passes through the Blackstairs Mountains via the Scullogue Gap into County Wexford and continues east until it terminates at a junction with the R890 in Enniscorthy.

The official description of the R702 from the Roads Act 1993 (Classification of Regional Roads) Order 2019 reads:

R702: Coolgrange — Gowran, County Kilkenny — Enniscorthy, County Wexford

Between its junction with R712 at Coolgrange and its junction with R448 at Main Street Gowran via Gallowshill all in the county of Kilkenny

and

between its junction with R448 at Gowran Demesne in the county of Kilkenny and its junction with R890 at Duffry Gate at Enniscorthy in the county of Wexford via Grange Lower; High Street and Bridge Street at Goresbridge; in the county of Kilkenny: Ballyellin, Ballyteiglea, Borris, Barmona, Kyle, Ballymurphy, Rathgeran and Coonogue in the county of Carlow: Kiltealy, Wheelagower, Monart West, Milehouse; and Bellfield Road at Enniscorthy in the county of Wexford

The route is 49 km (30 mi) long.

== See also ==
- Roads in Ireland
- National primary road
- National secondary road
