= N77 road (Ireland) =

Road in Ireland

N77 road
- Bóthar N77
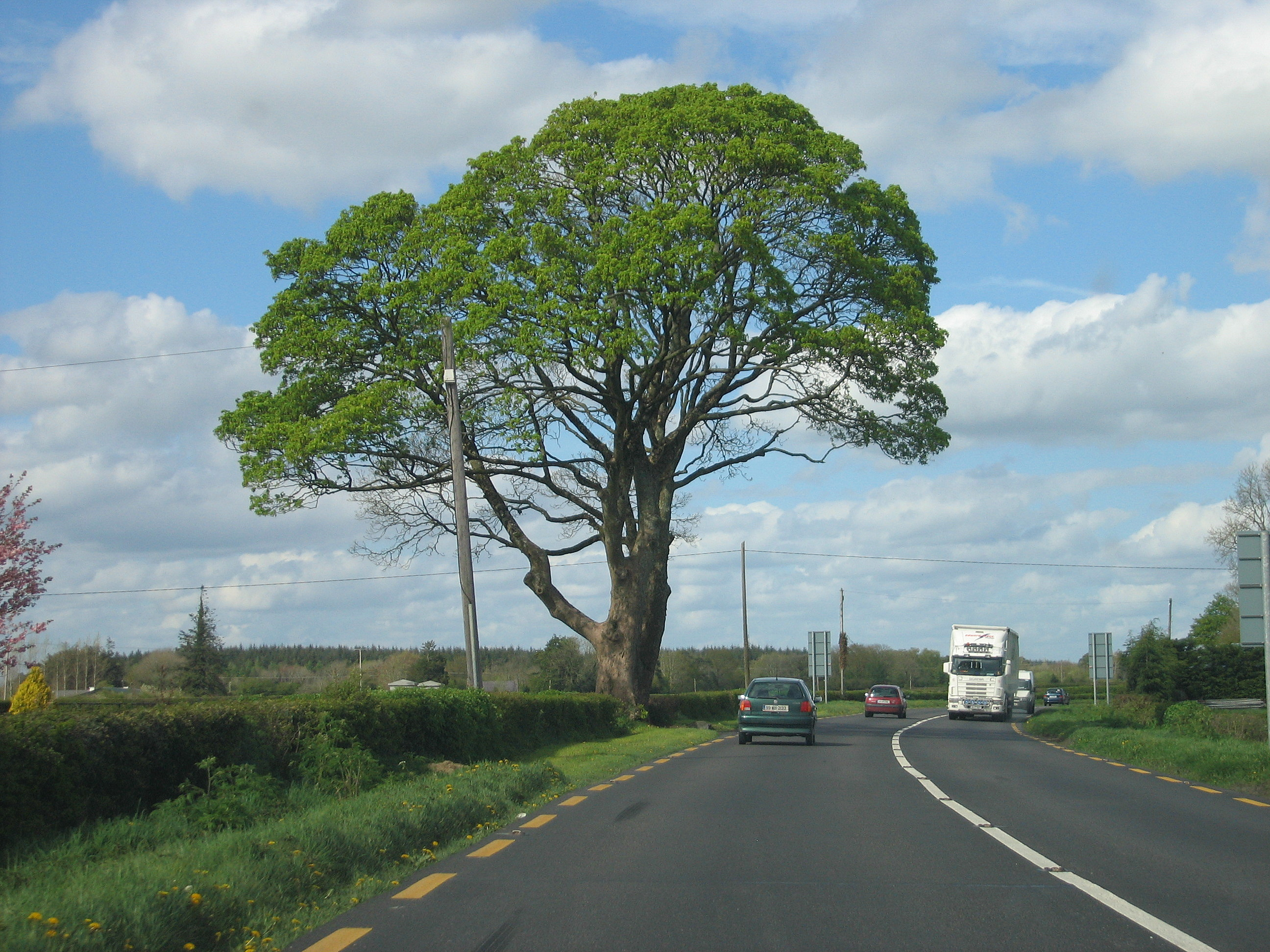
- N77 north of Abbeyleix, County Laois

Route information
- Length: 48.742 km (30.287 mi)

Location
- Country: Ireland
- Primary destinations: (bypassed routes in italics): County Kilkenny; Kilkenny City; Ballyragget; County Laois; Durrow; Abbeyleix; Terminates at M7 at Portlaoise

Highway system
- Roads in Ireland; Motorways; Primary; Secondary; Regional

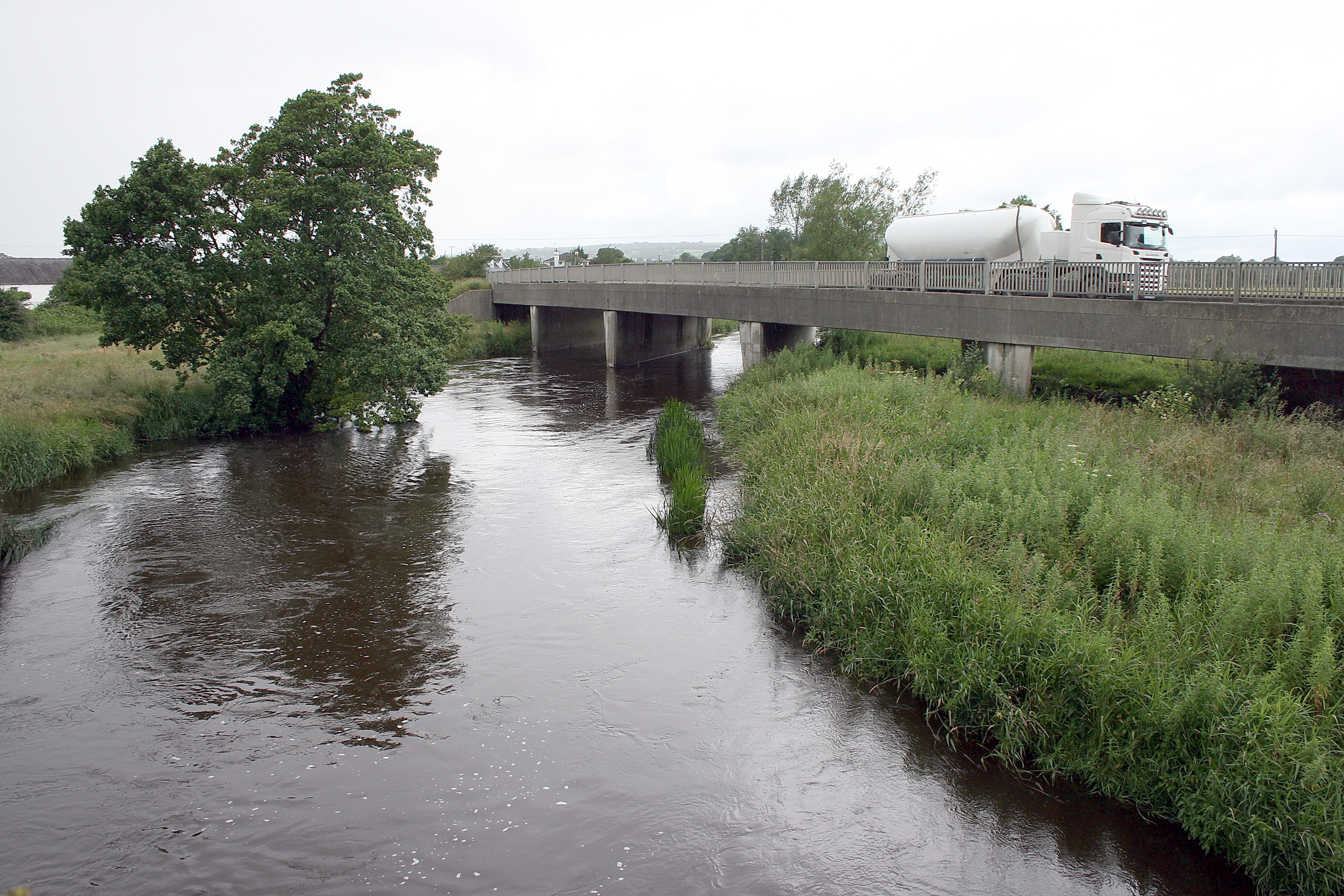
N77 crossing the River Nore at Ballyragget

The N77 road is a national secondary road in Ireland. It links the N10 national primary on the ring road south of Kilkenny, County Kilkenny to the M7 motorway at Portlaoise in County Laois.

== Upgrades and Extensions ==
In December 2007 a 4 km stretch at the southern end of the road terminating in Kilkenny city centre was replaced by a new road forming the northeastern section of the Kilkenny ring road and terminating at the N10 national primary road. The N10 forms the southeastern section of the ring road which opened in 1983. On 28 May 2010, a section of the single carriageway N8 road between Durrow and Portlaoise was redesignated the N77 when the final section of the M8 motorway opened to traffic. In 2018, a new 1.5km of road between Durrow and Ballyragget was opened with higher standard as it replaced the dangerous hilly sections of road.

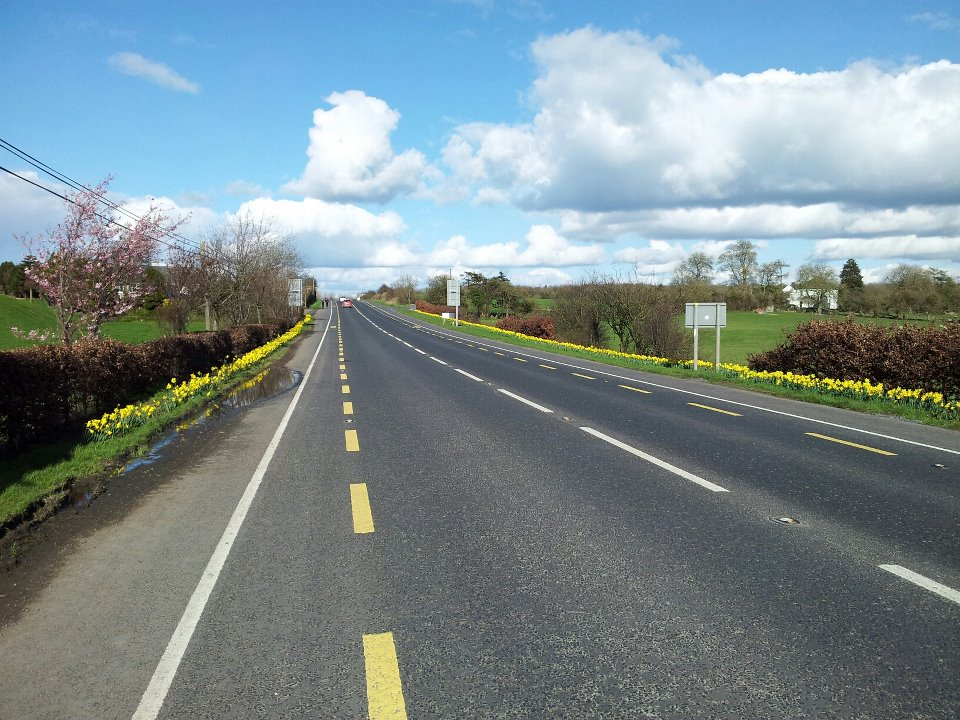
Daffodils in full bloom - March 2012

== See also ==
- Roads in Ireland
- Motorways in Ireland
- National primary road
- Regional road
