= Dungarvan, County Kilkenny =

Village in County Kilkenny, Ireland

Coordinates: 52.58666°N 7.09533°W

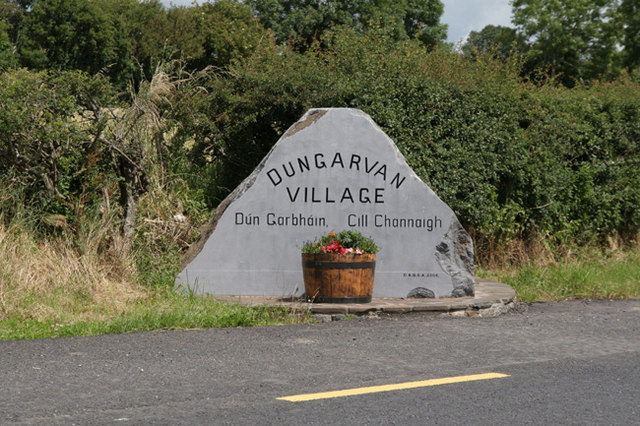
Entrance sign

Dungarvan (Irish: Dún Garbháin) is a small village and civil parish in County Kilkenny, Ireland. It is situated about 10 km (6 mi) south-east of Kilkenny city, on the R448 road between Gowran and Thomastown.
