= Gowran =

Town in County Kilkenny, Ireland

Gowran Irish: Gabhrán
- Town
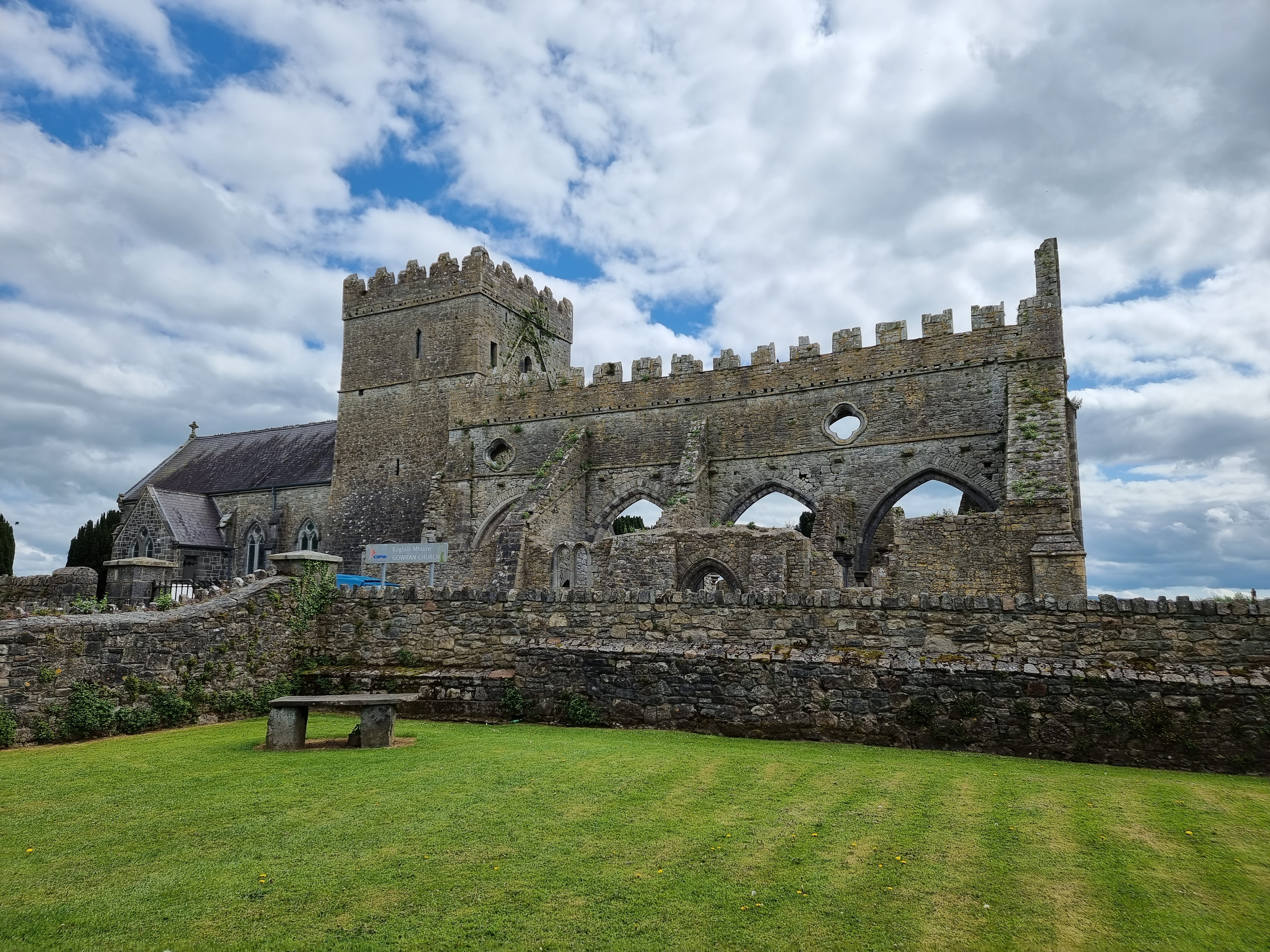
- St. Mary's Collegiate Church, Gowran

- Location in Ireland
- Coordinates: 52°37′45″N 7°04′00″W
- Country: Ireland
- Province: Leinster
- County: Kilkenny

Population (2022)
  - Total: 847
- Time zone: UTC+0 (WET)
  - Summer (DST): UTC-1 (IST (WEST))
- Website: www.kilkennycoco.ie

Gowran (/ˈɡoʊrən/; Irish: Gabhrán) is a town on the eastern side of County Kilkenny, Ireland. The historic St. Mary's Collegiate Church is in the centre of Gowran, close to Gowran Castle. Gowran Park race course and Golf Course are one kilometre from the centre of Gowran. The town is 13 km east of Kilkenny city, on the R448 road where it is crossed by the R702 road. Gowran is in a townland, civil parish and barony of the same name.

== History ==
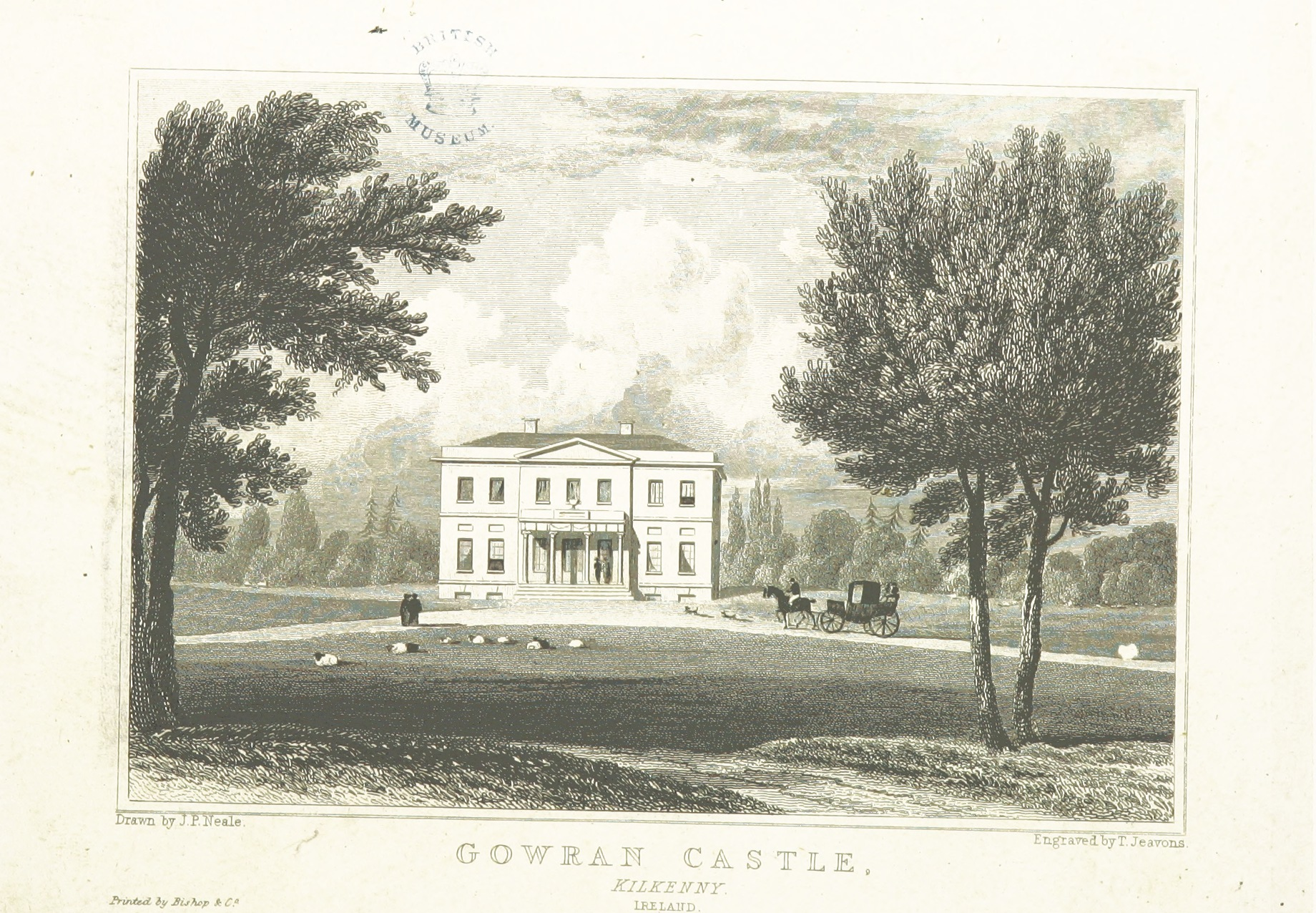
19th century engraving of Gowran Castle

Gowran was a place of importance prior to the Norman invasion and a royal residence of the Kings of Ossory, who were sometimes recorded as the Kings of Gowran. Edward the Bruce with his army of Scots and Ulstermen took the town in 1316. James Butler, 3rd Earl of Ormonde built Gowran Castle in 1385 close to the site of the present castle and town walls were erected circa 1415. A Magdelan hospital was built outside the walls circa 1578 "For the relief of poor leprous people".

The town, under the command of Colonel Robert Hammond, surrendered to Oliver Cromwell on 21 March 1650 following a siege. Colonel Hammond was a cousin of Cromwell. The soldiers of the garrison accepted Cromwell's offer of quarter for their lives and handed their officers over to the Parliamentarians. Cromwell ordered the execution by firing squad of all but one of the officers; a priest captured in the castle was hanged.

Its charter of incorporation appears to have been granted by James I in 1609, by which it was a parliamentary borough, with the constituency of Gowran sending two MPs to the Irish House of Commons until its abolition in 1801. Voting was restricted to the portreeve and burgesses. On its disfranchisement under the Acts of Union 1800, £15,000 compensation was given to Viscount Clifden. After the Union, the municipal corporation had only a nominal existence.

== Churches ==
In the centre of the village is the historic St. Mary's Collegiate Church which contains monuments from the 14th to 17th centuries. This Collegiate Church was built in the late 13th century on the site of an earlier monastery. It was served by a "college"—clerics who lived in a community but who did not submit to the rule of a monastery. They lived in a house, now destroyed, beside the Church. The Church was a large and elaborate structure, with an aisled nave—the main part of the Church where the congregation gathered—and a long chancel—the section of the Church where the altar was placed—and has high-quality architectural sculpture used throughout. In the Late Middle Ages a massive tower was inserted between the nave and chancel, and in the 19th century this tower was incorporated into the parish church which was built in place of the chancel and which now takes up about half of the building. There were also several other changes made to the Church at various periods. St. Mary's Church is now a National Monument.

The Catholic Church is the Church of the Assumption.

== Education ==
Scoil Mhuire Gabhrán, or St. Mary's National School Gowran, is located on the Kilkenny side of the town opposite the Catholic Church of the Assumption. The current building was begun in 1958. Prior to the construction of the new school in 1958, there was a four-classroom school adjacent to the current building. This school building was built in 1900 and is now used as a community hall. The National School in Dungarvan (County Kilkenny) which is part of the parish of Gowran closed in 1967 following which the pupils attended Gowran NS. The school was extended in 1979 and 2011. The primary school has also been awarded two An Taisce Green Flags which are displayed outside the school. The Green Schools programme is run by An Taisce together with the Kilkenny County Council. As part of their project work to achieve Green Flag status for water conservation, the school converted all their single flush siphonic toilets (school toilets use on average 85% of school water) from single flush to variable flush using the Mecon Green Button Water Saver. The school also has a biodiversity area which contains some species of deciduous broad-leaved trees and an orchard with several apple tree varieties.

Secondary Schools in the Gowran area include those in Kilkenny City, Borris, County Carlow, Thomastown and Graiguenamanagh. School transport is provided both to and from Gowran NS and secondary schools.

== Barony of Gowran ==
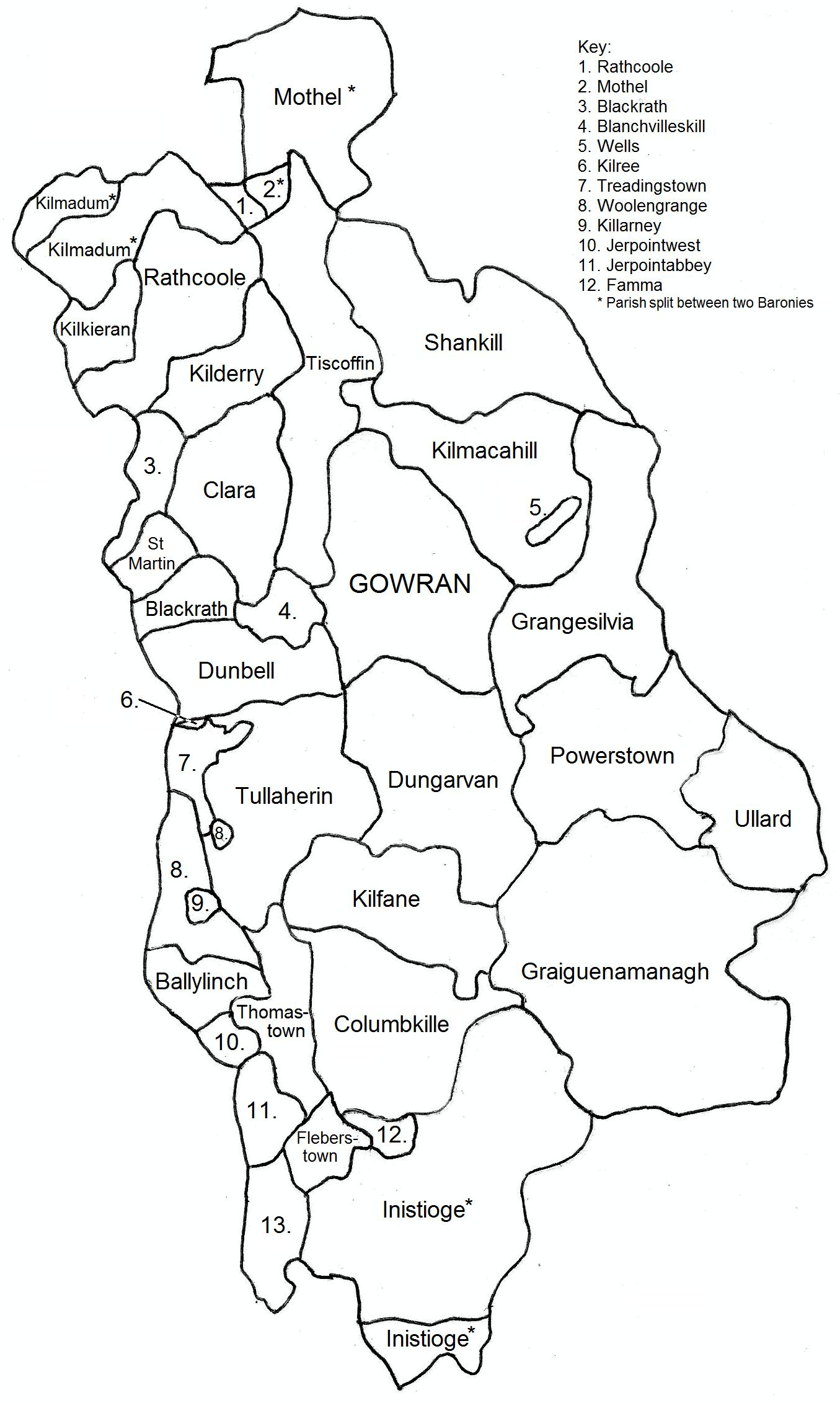
A map of the parishes in The Barony of Gowran

Gowran is at the centre of the Barony of the same name. The Barony of Gowran contains 36 parishes (see map), three of which are split between the Barony of Gowran and the Baronies of Fassadinin and Ida (Mothell, Kilmadum and Inistioge). Most of the eastern boundary of the barony of Gowran is formed by the River Barrow.

Richard FitzPatrick was created Lord Gowran in 1715, and his son John was created Earl of Upper Ossory in 1751. Both titles became extinct in 1818.

== Transport ==
=== Rail ===
Gowran railway station opened on 14 November 1850 and closed on 1 January 1963.

Gowran can be reached from Kilkenny railway station (14 kilometres), Muine Bheag railway station (13 kilometres) and Thomastown railway station (14 kilometres distant). Kilkenny railway station has a park and ride facility. There is a charge for parking. Muine Bheag also has a park and ride facility. Parking was free until 2015 when charges were introduced.

=== Bus ===
Gowran is served several times daily by Bus Éireann route 4 which operates from Waterford to Dublin and Dublin Airport serving several locations en route such as Thomastown and Carlow. Journeys on this route use the M9 and M7 motorways between Carlow and the Dublin outskirts. Bus connections to Rosslare Europort are available at Waterford. Gowran is also served by the Graiguenamanagh – Goresbridge – Kilkenny Kilbride Coaches route with two journeys each way daily except Sundays. The northbound Bus Éireann stop has a shelter and seat.

== Gowran Park and Annaly Estate ==
Gowran Park horse racing course and golf course is located near the village. In 2014, Gowran Park celebrated a century of racing at the venue, the first race meeting having been held there on 16 June 1914.

In 1914, the Gowran Park racecourse was part of the Annaly Estate Gowran. At that time the Gowran Castle estate was owned by Lady Annaly who was a keen follower of sport. She attended cricket matches in Gowran. In 1900 she presented a silver cup to the Gowran cricket club which is still kept in Gowran. The Lady Annaly Cup was played annually. In 1930 she presented the County Championship Trophy at Northamptonshire Golf Club.

Lady Annaly's father, Henry Agar-Ellis, 3rd Viscount Clifden owned a number of horses the most successful of which were Crucifix and Surplice who won many classics. Surplice won the Epsom Derby and the St. Leger in 1848.

Her husband, Lord Annaly was one of the first stewards at Gowran Park. The Annaly estate in Gowran was a walled estate of 774 acres set amidst a historic landscape of Norman castles and the historic St. Mary's Church, with woodlands, lakes, deer park, a home farm, out farms, stables, coach house orchards, walled gardens and walking trails. The Gowran river flows through the estate.

The "Gowran Wall" which was built around the estate in the 18th and 19th centuries was 4.5 miles long and is still in existence today. The estate wall forms part of the racecourse boundary wall. The estate was part of the Gowran Castle estate. Gowran Castle is located in the centre of the town of Gowran one mile from Gowran Park racecourse.

The Gowran Castle estate became known as the Annaly estate after the Hon. Liliah Georgiana Augusta Constance Agar-Ellis (1862–1944) married Luke White (Lord Annaly), 3rd Baron Annaly (1862–1922). After her marriage to Lord Annaly, she became known as Lady Annaly. Lilah inherited the Gowran Agar estate. She was a descendant of Charles Agar who came to Gowran c.1650 from Yorkshire in England. Charles Agar and many of his descendants are buried in St. Mary's Church Gowran (Church open to visitors during the summer months. Grounds open all year round). Later members of the Agar family held the title of Viscount Clifden over several generations. The Agars were often referred to as Lords Clifden or Clifdens of Gowran.

== Sport ==
Gowran is known for its racecourse, Gowran Park, which hosts the Thyestes Chase (The Grand National of the South), a steeplechase in Ireland which has been won by three-time Cheltenham Gold Cup Winner, Arkle in 1964 and Aintree Grand National winners Hedgehunter and Numbersixvalverde. It has 16 National Hunt and Flat meetings all year round. Gowran Park is also home to a golf course and is used as a venue for meetings, conferences, weddings and parties. There is also a pitch and putt course in the village.

Young Irelands Gaelic Athletic Association Club are based just outside the village on the Goresbridge Road. Senior County Hurling Champions in 1996 and 2002, they were also runners-up in 1997, 2003 and 2004. The Young Irelands Camogie Club is mentioned in a book titled "The Gowran GAA Story", where it is noted that "The late Mrs. Catherine Drennan recalled that girls from Gowran, Paulstown, Bonnetstown and Thomastown played Camogie in Gowran in the early 1900s. Their first match was played in April 1908. The club was known as "Gowran Combined" and the colours were Blue and White". The club's current colours are red and white.

The local soccer team is called Ajax. Gowran Athletic Club (Gowran AC) provide a range of athletic sporting activities for varying age groups.

== People ==
Noted residents and former residents include:-

- Colonel Dan Bryan, head of the Irish Army's intelligence unit G2 during "The Emergency" (World War II), was born in Dunbell near Gowran.
- James Butler was created 1st Earl of Ormonde in 1328. He married Lady Eleanor De Bohun in 1327. After their marriage, she became Countess of Ormonde. Eleanor was a granddaughter of King Edward Ι of England and niece of King Edward ΙΙ of England. James is buried in St.Mary's Church Gowran.
- D. J. Carey who was born here. He played hurling for Kilkenny until his retirement in 2006. He is regarded as an icon of the sport and has won most of the major honours in the game.
- The ancestors of Walt Disney are from Gowran. Arundel Elias Disney, emigrated from Gowran, County Kilkenny, where he was born in 1801.
- Kilkenny hurlers Kevin Fennelly and Lester Ryan
- William Butler Yeats was a descendant of the Butlers of Neigham (pronounced Nyam) in the townland of Neigham Gowran. His great, great-grandmother, Mary Butler of the Neigham branch of the Butler family married Benjamen Yeats in Tullamore in 1773. Many generations of the Butlers lived in Gowran and surrounds for over 500 years following the Norman Invasion in 1169, after which Theobald Fitzwalter was granted lands around Gowran. Theobald was the ancestor of the Butler and Ormonde families. He incorporated the town of Gowran sometime after 1177. He died in 1206. The Manor of Gowran, around 44 000 acres remained in Butler hands until c. 1700. The early Butler Earls of Ormonde are buried in St. Mary's Church Gowran. Neigham Castle was built about 1477 by Sir James Butler for his eldest son Edmund. He was called "The Earl of Gowran".

== See also ==
- Ordnance Survey of Ireland (OSI)
