= Leighlinbridge =

Village in County Carlow, Ireland

Leighlinbridge Irish: Leithghlinn an Droichid
- town
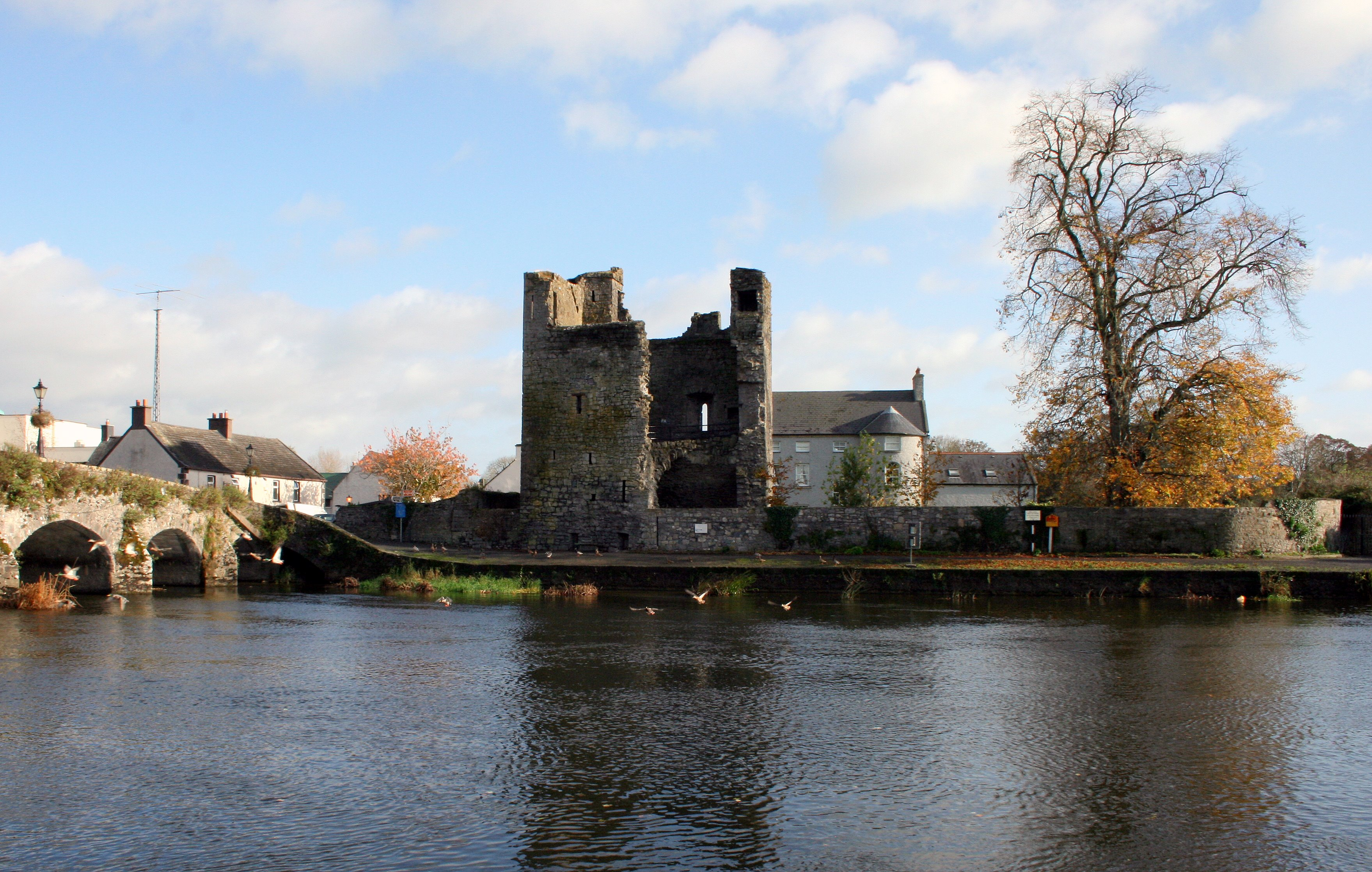
- The Black Castle on the River Barrow in Leighlinbridge

- Location in Ireland
- Coordinates: 52°44′11″N 6°58′21″W
- Country: Ireland
- Province: Leinster
- County: County Carlow
- Elevation: 41 m (135 ft)

Population (2022)
  - Total: 959
- Time zone: UTC+0 (WET)
  - Summer (DST): UTC-1 (IST (WEST))
- Irish Grid Reference: S694654

Historical population
Year	Pop.	±%
1831	2,035	—
1841	1,748	−14.1%
1851	1,292	−26.1%
1861	1,245	−3.6%
1871	1,066	−14.4%
1881	835	−21.7%
1891	744	−10.9%
1901	646	−13.2%
1911	544	−15.8%
1926	406	−25.4%
1936	425	+4.7%
1946	394	−7.3%
1951	326	−17.3%
1956	375	+15.0%
1961	457	+21.9%
1966	444	−2.8%
1971	379	−14.6%
1981	515	+35.9%
1986	540	+4.9%
1991	510	−5.6%
1996	508	−0.4%
2002	646	+27.2%
2006	674	+4.3%
2011	828	+22.8%
2016	914	+10.4%
2022	959	+4.9%

Leighlinbridge (/ˈlɔːxlɪn.brɪdʒ/; Irish: Leithghlinn an Droichid, meaning 'half-glen (or grey glen) of the bridge') is a small town on the River Barrow in County Carlow, Ireland. It is 11 km south of Carlow town, on the R705 road. The N9 national primary route once passed through the village, but was by-passed in the 1980s.

Leighlinbridge covers the townlands of Leighlin (east bank of the river) and Ballyknockan (west bank). The village features narrow winding streets, grey limestone malthouses and ruined castle (tower house) overlooking a historical bridge across the River Barrow. Leighlinbridge has won the National Tidy Towns Competition, has come first in the Barrow Awards, been an overall national winner in Ireland's Green Town 2000, and represented Ireland in the European "Entente Florale" competition in 2001.

== History ==
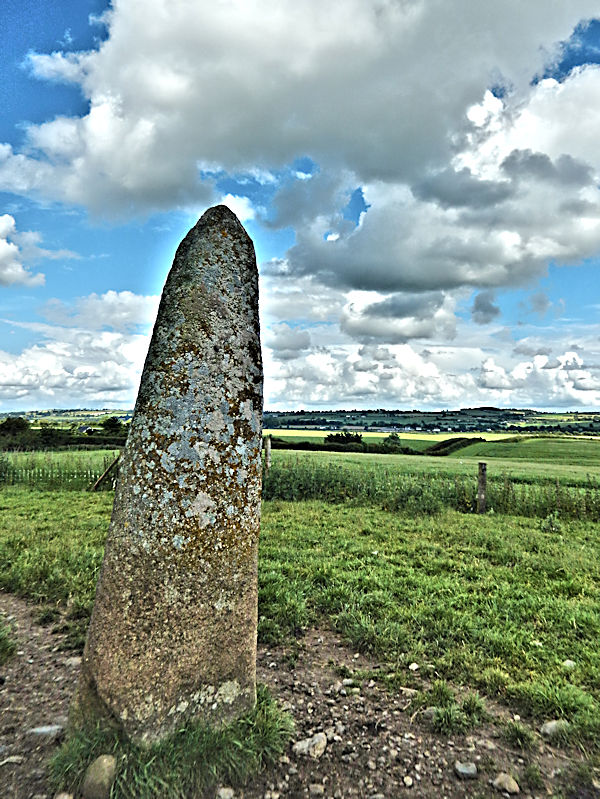
Standing stone at Leighlinbridge

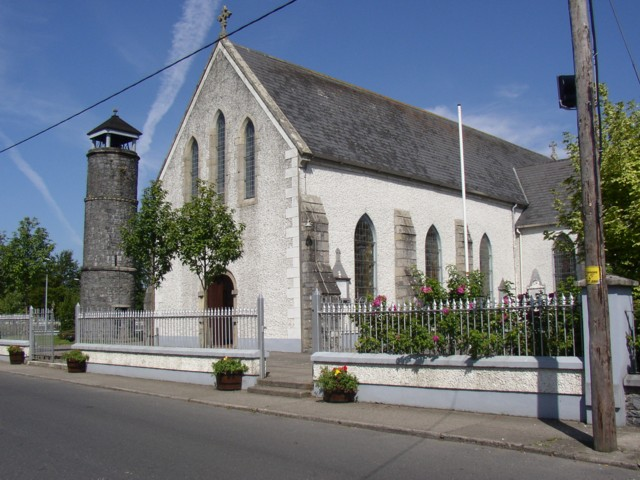
St Laiserain's Catholic Church in Leighlinbridge

Evidence of ancient settlement in the area includes a number of standing stone, enclosure, barrow, motte and ring ditch sites in the townlands of Leighlinbridge, Ballyknockan and Coneykeare.

Leighlinbridge Castle, also called Black Castle, is a 14th century Norman tower house which was built to defend the nearby bridge. A 50 ft tall broken castle tower and bawn wall are all that can be seen today. The bridge was replaced in the 18th century, and may have incorporated elements of the earlier medieval structure.

Several houses in Leighlinbridge date to the 18th century, while the local Catholic church was completed c. 1830.

On the night of 28 November 1999, a loud detonation and bright fireball was observed over County Carlow for several seconds. In addition to several other specimens, a fusion crusted individual meteoritic rock was discovered in Leighlinbridge on 12 December 1999. It is now officially called the "Leighlinbridge" by the International Meteorite Nomenclature Committee. The meteorites totalled 271.4 grams in weight.

== Amenities ==
The Arboretum Garden Centre is a located a kilometre east of the town at the Leighlinbridge Cross with the N9.

The local primary school is Leighlinbridge N.S.

== Sports ==
There are three Gaelic Athletic Association (GAA) clubs in the Leighlinbridge area: Naomh Bríd, Leighlinbridge and Micheal Davitts. Naomh Bríd is a hurling club that competes in the Carlow Senior Hurling Championship and the Carlow Intermediate Hurling Championship. Leighlinbridge is a football club that competes in the Carlow Junior Football Championship. Micheal Davitts are a football club that competes at underage levels.

Vale Wanderers is a local association football (soccer) club which fields teams at both underage and senior levels.

== People ==
- Cardinal Patrick Francis Moran (1830–1911), third Archbishop of Sydney, was born in Leighlinbridge
- John Tyndall (1820–1893), physicist known for his study of diamagnetism, was born in Main Street, Leighlinbridge
- Myles Keogh (1840–1876), American Civil War military officer and later Captain of Company I, U.S. 7th Cavalry Regiment. Fought in Indian Wars and was killed at the Battle of the Little Bighorn. He was born in Orchard, Leighlinbridge.

== See also ==
- List of towns and villages in Ireland
