= Ballymurphy, County Carlow =

Ballymurphy Baile Uí Mhurchú
- Village
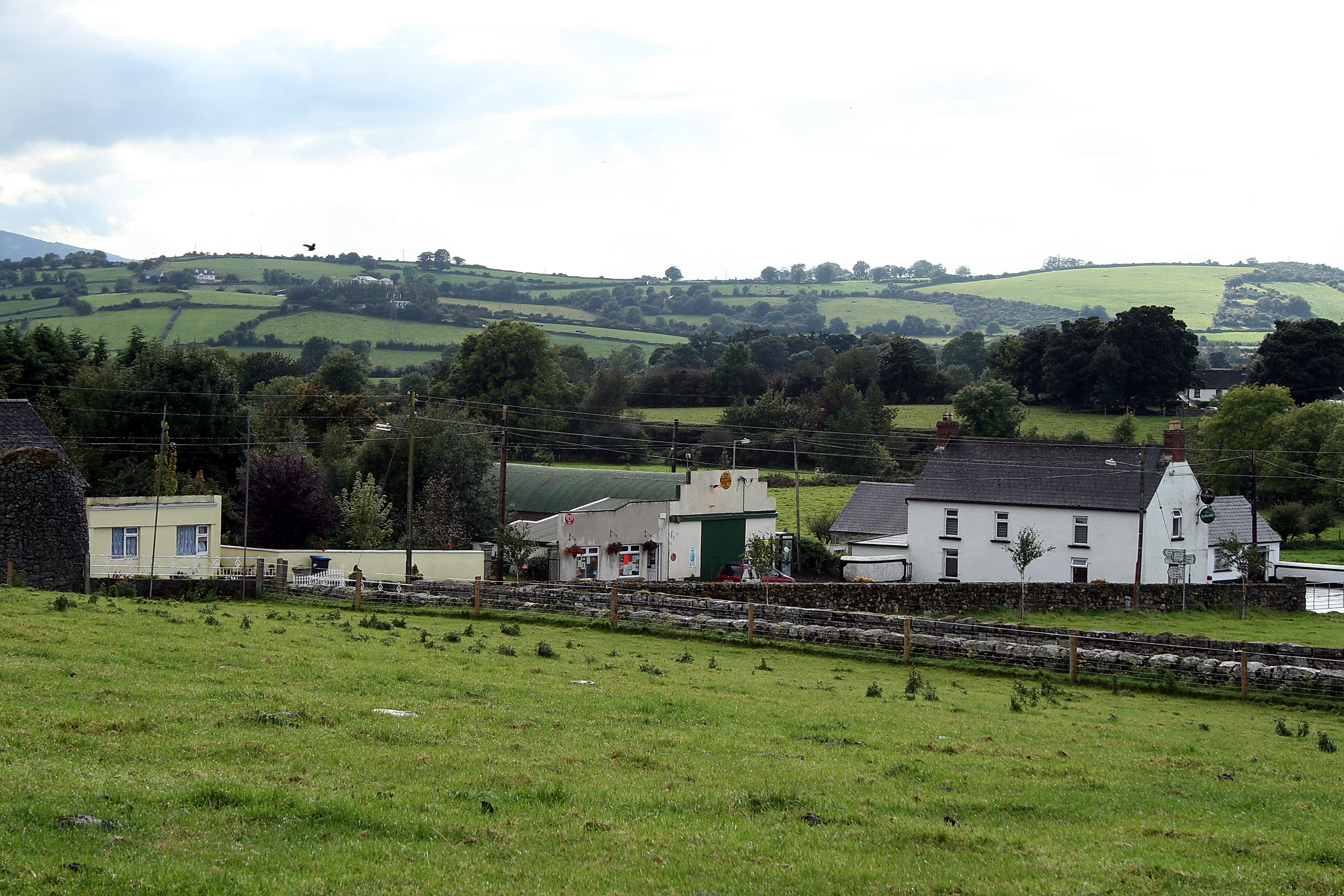
- Ballymurphy, County Carlow

- Location in Ireland
- Coordinates: 52°34′17″N 6°51′44″W
- Country: Ireland
- Province: Leinster
- County: County Carlow
- Time zone: UTC+0 (WET)
  - Summer (DST): UTC-1 (IST (WEST))

Ballymurphy, historically Ballymurchoe (Irish: Baile Uí Mhurchú), is a village in County Carlow, Ireland on the R702 regional road. It lies on the western flank of the Blackstairs Mountains.

Ballymurphy lies between the Carlow town of Borris and the Wexford village of Kiltealy.

== See also ==
- List of towns and villages in Ireland
