= R448 road (Ireland) =

Road in Ireland

R448 road
- Bóthar R448
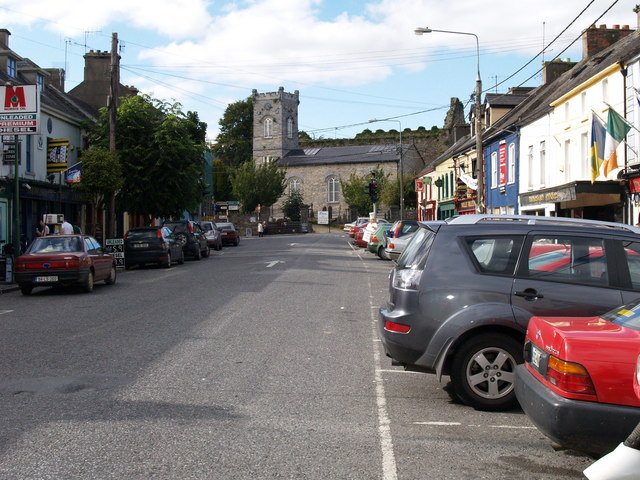
- Market Street, Thomastown, County Kilkenny, on the R448

Route information
- Length: 124 km (77 mi)

Location
- Country: Ireland

Highway system
- Roads in Ireland; Motorways; Primary; Secondary; Regional

The R448 road is a regional road in Ireland. It is the designation given to the former N9 national primary road when it was bypassed by the M9 motorway.

== Route ==
The official description of the R448 from the Roads Act 1993 (Classification of Regional Roads) Order 2012 reads:

R448: Naas, County Kildare — Waterford (Old National Route 9)

Between its junction with R445 at Main Street in the town of Naas and its junction with N80 at Rathnapish in the county of Carlow via Fairgreen and Kilcullen Road in the town of Naas: Bluebell, Mylerstown Cross, Stephenstown South; Main Street in the town of Kilcullen; Knockbounce, Knockaulin, Kilgowan, Crookstown upper, Ballitore, Timolin, Moone; Market Square and Abbey Street at Castledermot; and Prumplestown Lower in the county of Kildare: Gorteengrone in the county of Carlow: Knocknagee in the county of Kildare: and Pollerton Little in the county of Carlow

and

between its junction with N80 at Cannery Road in the town of Carlow and its junction with the R680 at Brother Ignatius Rice Bridge in the city of Waterford via Dublin Road, Green Lane, Shamrock Square, Barrack Street, Riverside and Kilkenny Road in the town of Carlow: Cloghristick, Ballynaboley, Leighlinbridge Bypass, Clorusk Upper and Wells in the county of Carlow: Paulstown, Gowran Demesne; Main Street at Gowran; Dungarvan; Maudlin Street, Logan’s Street, Low Street, (and via Market Street, Pipe Street) Market Street, Thomastown Bridge and Mill Street at Thomastown; Moanroe Commons, Kiltorcan, Ballyhale, Lukeswell, Mullinavat, Skeard, Granny and Newrath in the county of Kilkenny: Sallypark and Terminus Street in the city of Waterford.

== See also ==
- Roads in Ireland
- National primary road
- National secondary road
