= European route E1 in the Republic of Ireland =

The European route E1 in the Republic of Ireland is a series of roads, part of the International E-road network running in a north south axis on the Irish east coast. It runs through five counties starting on the British border with the province of Northern Ireland at Dundalk, coming from Belfast and Larne. It passes the capital Dublin until it stops at Rosslare Harbour in the South-East of the island of Ireland. From there the E1 crosses the Celtic Sea and the Bay of Biscay on a non-existent ferry towards Spain and Portugal.

== Route ==
The E1 comes from Northern Ireland when it crosses the border at Dundalk where the British A1 road changes to the Irish N1 road until northern Dundalk. It then follows the M1 motorway to Drogheda and eventually the capital Dublin. After using the M50 ring road around Dublin, the E1 uses the N11 road and M11 motorway passing Bray, Wicklow, Gorey and Enniscorthy to Wexford. The last part is the N25 road towards Rosslare Harbour. The E1 covers a total distance of 266 km (165 mi) in the Republic of Ireland.

== Detailed route ==
E1 Dundalk - Rosslare
County	National road number	Section	Junction
(United Kingdom)	A1 road	UK from Larne to border with Republic of Ireland via Belfast, Lisburn and Newry	
(European Union) (Republic of Ireland) Louth	N1 road	Northern Ireland-Dundalk	20 R132 Carrickcarnan, UK (Jonesborough) 19 R174 Ravensdale 18 N52 Dundalk (North), Carlingford
(European Union) (Republic of Ireland) Louth	M1 motorway	Dundalk-Drogheda	17 N53 Dundalk (Center), Castleblayney, Monaghan 16 N52 Dundalk (South), Ardee, Mullingar Castlebellingham service station 15 R166 Castlebellingham, Tallanstown 14 N33, N2 Ardee, Monaghan, UK (Derry) 13 R170 Dunleer 12 R169 Dunleer, Collon 11 R132 Monasterboice 10 N51 Drogheda (North), Navan, Slane, Hospital
Meath	M1 motorway	Drogheda-Balbriggan	9 Drogheda, Donore, Duleek 8 Drogheda, Duleek near Julianstown 7 Julianstown, Laytown, Stamullen
Dublin	M1 motorway	Balbriggan-Dublin	6 R122 Balbriggan, Skerries, Naul 5 R132 Balbriggan, Lusk, Rush Lusk service station 4 R132 Swords, Malahide, Donabate 3 R125 Swords, Ashbourne 2 Dublin Airport 1 Malahide M50 towards Southbound
Dublin	M50 motorway	Dublin city	4 R108 Ballymun, Naul 5 N2, M2 Dublin center, Finglas, Ashbourne, UK (Derry) 6 N3, M3 Dublin center, Cavan, Navan, Castleknock, Connolly Hospital 7 N4, M4, M6 Dublin center, Galway, Sligo, Westport, Mullingar, Lucan 9 N7, M7, M8, M9 Dublin center, Cork, Limerick, Waterford, Inchicore, Clondalkin, Naas 10 R838 Ballymount, Cookstown, Belgard Road 11 N81 Blessington, Templeogue, Tallaght 12 R113, Knocklyon, Firehouse 13 R826 Sandyford, Dundrum 14 N31 Dún Laoghaire, Stillorgan 15 Cornelscourt, Kilternan 16 R118, Cherrywood, Loughlinstown 17 M11 towards Dublin center, Dún Laoghaire
Dublin	M11 motorway	Dublin city	5 R761 Bray (North)
Wicklow	N11 road	Bray-Ashford	6 R918 Bray, Fassaroe R117 towards Enniskerry, Glencullen 7 R767 Bray (South), Greystones, Enniskerry 8 R755 Roundwood, Kilmacanogue 9 Greystones, Roundwood, Glenview 10 R762 Delgany, Greystones, Drummin 11 R774 Greystones (South), Kilpedder, Kilcoole 12 R772 Newtownmountkennedy, Roundwood, Kilcoole 13 R772 Newtownmountkennedy (South), Newcastle, Roundwood
Wicklow	M11 motorway	Ashford-Arklow	14 R772 Coynes Cross 15 R772 Ashford (North) 16 R772 Wicklow (North), Ashford (South), Rathnew 17 R772 Wicklow (Center), Rathnew, Rathdrum, Glenealy 18 R751 Wicklow (South), Rathdrum 19 Brittas Bay, Redcross 20 R772 Arklow (North), Redcross, Avoca 21 R772 Arklow (South), Inch, Aughrim
Wexford	M11 motorway	Arklow-Enniscorthy	Gorey service station 22 R772 Gorey (North), Inch, Killinierin 23 R732 (R742, R741) Gorey (South), Courtown, Ballycanew 24 R772 Clough, Camolin, Ferns 25 N30, R744 Enniscorthy, Ferns, Blackwater, New Ross, Carlow
Wexford	N11 road	Enniscorthy-Wexford	R772 towards Enniscorthy Oylegate Wexford R730 towards Wexford center R730 towards Killurin, Kiltealy N25, R769 towards Wexford center, New Ross, Waterford, Limerick, Cork
Wexford	N25 road	Wexford-Rosslare Harbour	R733 towards Wexford center, Arthurstown, Wellingtonbridge, Duncannon R730 towards Wexford center R739 towards Kilmore Quay Killinick R740 towards Rosslare Tagoat R736 towards Rosslare, Bridgetown, Kilmore Quay Kilrane Rosslare Harbour Rosslare Europort
(European Union) (Spain) (Galicia (Spain))	Sea route Rosslare Harbour-Ferrol	Spain towards Ferrol, A Coruña and Vigo	
