= Bantry (County Wexford barony) =

Barony in County Wexford, Ireland

Bantry Beanntraí (Irish)
- Barony
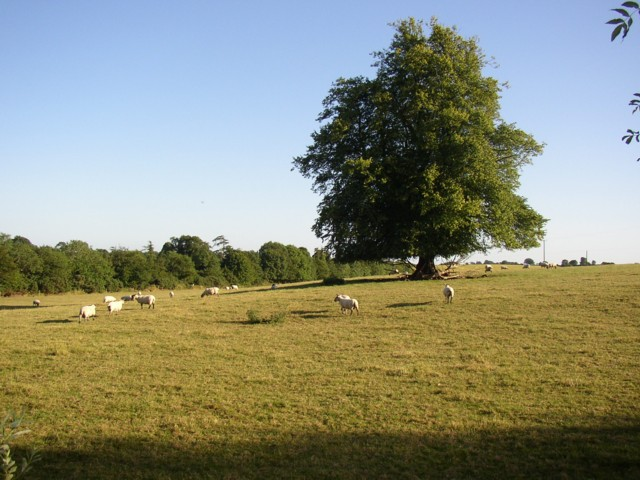
- Fields at Old Ross

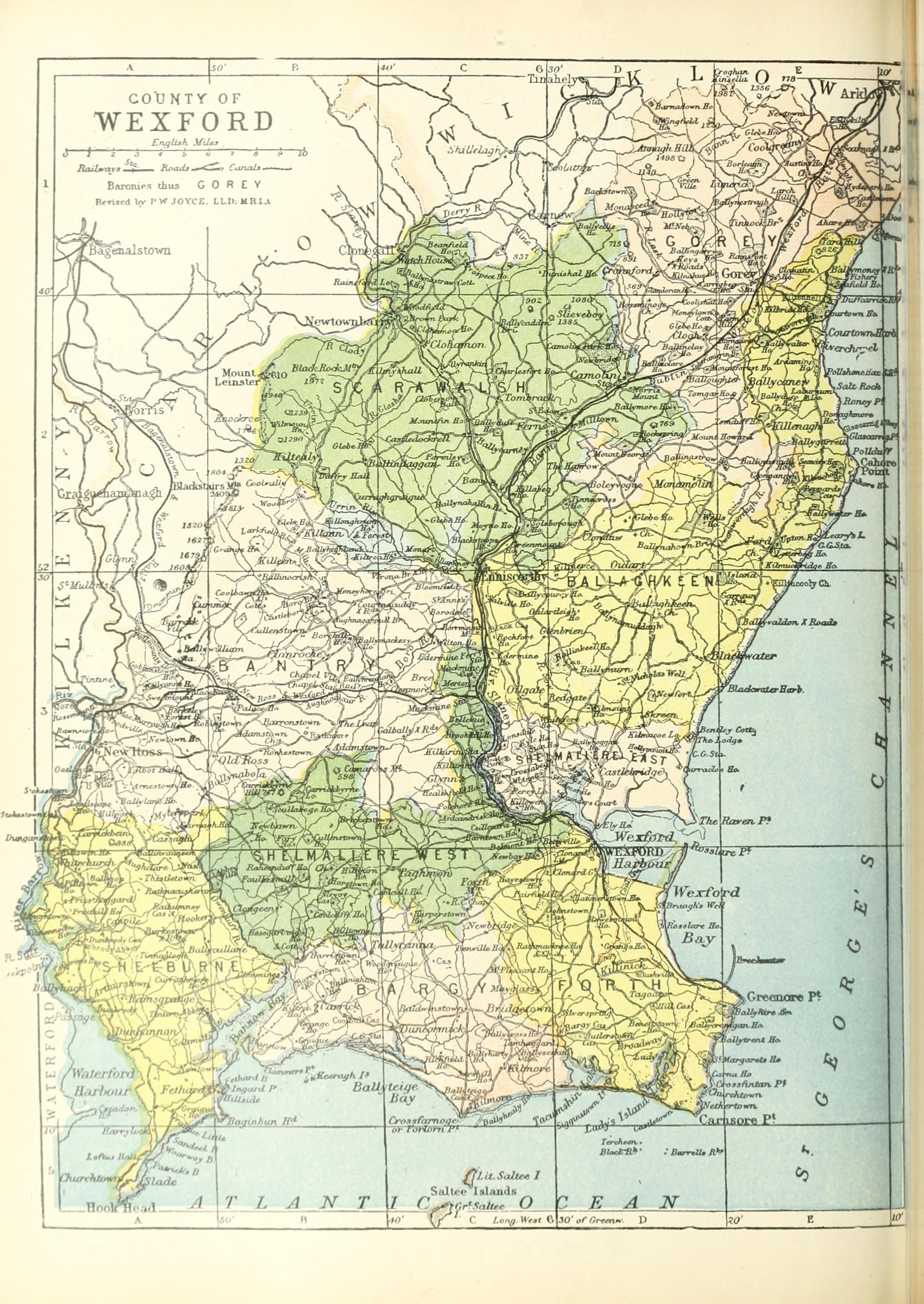
- Barony map of County Wexford, 1900; Bantry barony is in the west, coloured pink.

- Location within Ireland
- Coordinates: 52°27′N 6°43′W
- Sovereign state: Ireland
- Province: Leinster
- County: Wexford

Area
  - Total: 411.1 km^{2} (158.7 sq mi)

Bantry (Irish: Beanntraí) is a historical barony in northeast County Wexford, Ireland.

Baronies were mainly cadastral rather than administrative units. They acquired modest local taxation and spending functions in the 19th century before being superseded by the Local Government (Ireland) Act 1898.

== History ==
The barony of Bantry takes its name from the Gaelic Irish tribe of the Benntraige ("Benn's people"), believed to be connected to the Coriondi, mentioned in Ptolemy's 2nd century Geography. A portion of the tribe later colonised southwest Munster, giving their name to Bantry, County Cork, Bantry barony and Bantry Bay.

The chiefs of Bantry were later known by the surname O'Cosgraidh (O'Cosgrave). The entire barony was forfeit under the Act for the Settlement of Ireland 1652.

== Geography ==
Bantry is in the west of the county, roughly the area south of the River Urrin, west of the River Slaney, east of the Blackstairs Mountains and the borders with County Kilkenny and County Carlow, and north of Carrickbyrne Hill.

== List of settlements ==
Settlements within the Wexford barony of Bantry include:

- Adamstown
- Ballywilliam
- Bree
- Clonroche
- Killanne
- New Ross
- Raheen
- Rathnure
