= N30 road (Ireland) =

Road in Ireland

N30 road
- Bóthar N30

Route information
- Length: 40.5 km (25.2 mi)

Location
- Country: Ireland
- Primary destinations: (bypassed routes in italics): County Wexford; New Ross (N25, R700, R729); Clonroche (R730, R735); Enniscorthy (M11, N80, R702, R744)

Highway system
- Roads in Ireland; Motorways; Primary; Secondary; Regional

The N30 road is a national primary road in Ireland. It connects the N25 road and M11 motorway, providing a link running east-northeast through County Wexford, between New Ross and Enniscorthy. This provides for a more direct national route between the two towns, as the N25 and N11 both run to Wexford town, eastwards from New Ross and southwards from Enniscorthy respectively.

== Route ==
The route connects to the N25 Wexford Road at Kent's Cross Roundabout, southeast of New Ross in County Wexford, and follows north along the New Ross Relief Road, through a traffic light controlled crossroads in the Irishtown, before cornering west to a junction with the R700 on Craywell Road in Mount Elliott. It then heads north for approximately 550 metres before it corners eastwards for a distance of about 250 metres in Mountgarret, passing the junction with the R700 at the southern approach to Mountgarret Bridge which leads to Kilkenny, and it then heads east for approximately 800 metres, passes a junction with the R729 which leads to Borris, and then heads east-northeast towards Clonroche. The road later passes through Clonroche, continuing east for about two kilometres, and then passes by three junctions; one with the R735, which heads southwest to Gusserane via Adamstown and Newbawn; and two with the R730, one which heads southeast to Wexford and the other which heads northwest to Kiltealy. The road then continues northeast towards Enniscorthy, bypassing the town to the north. The single carriageway section of the bypass begins at a roundabout in Templescoby. The road then passes through a roundabout in Milehouse, where it meets the R702, and ends at the Clavass Roundabout, where it meets the R772, just south of the Scarawalsh Roundabout, where the southeastern terminus of the N80 national secondary road is. The dual carriageway section of the bypass then extends in a southeastern direction from the Scarawalsh Roundabout, effectively as a southeastern extension of the N80 road, crossing the River Slaney and connecting to junction 25 of the M11 motorway in Ballydawmore.

== History ==
In the old Trunk Road and Link Road classification system or Main Road classification system, which was introduced in 1925, the route that is now the N30 formed a part of the T7 trunk road, the main Dublin–Waterford route. Wexford County Council started using the Trunk Road designations, internally at least, by June 1925.

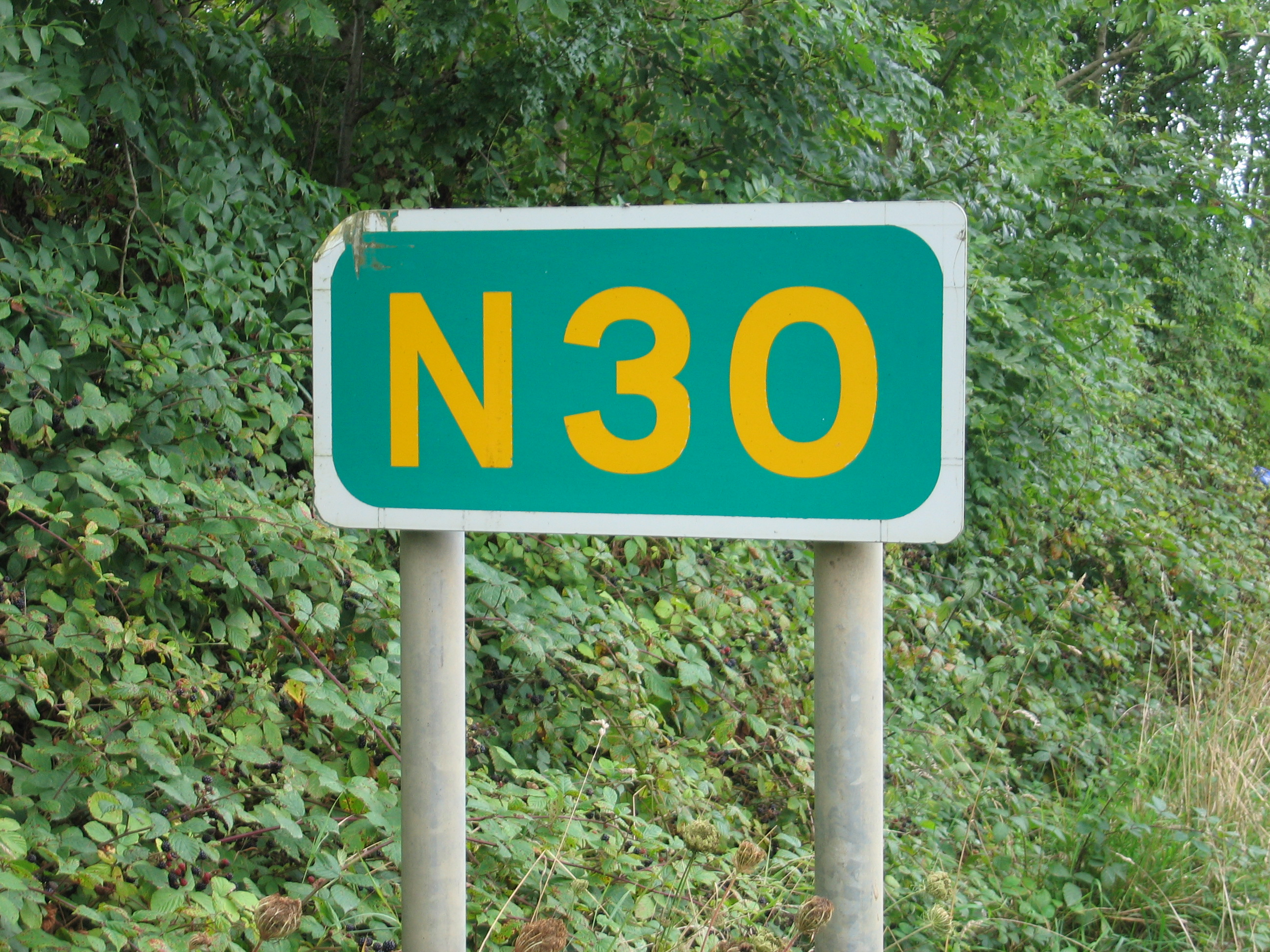
Route marker

When the national roads system was introduced in 1977, the N30 route was originally designated as the N79 national secondary road, and the N9 national primary road became the main Dublin–Waterford road. The former sections of the T7 trunk road running from Dublin to Enniscorthy and from Waterford to New Ross became part of the N11 Dublin–Wexford road, and the N25 Cork–Rosslare Harbour road.

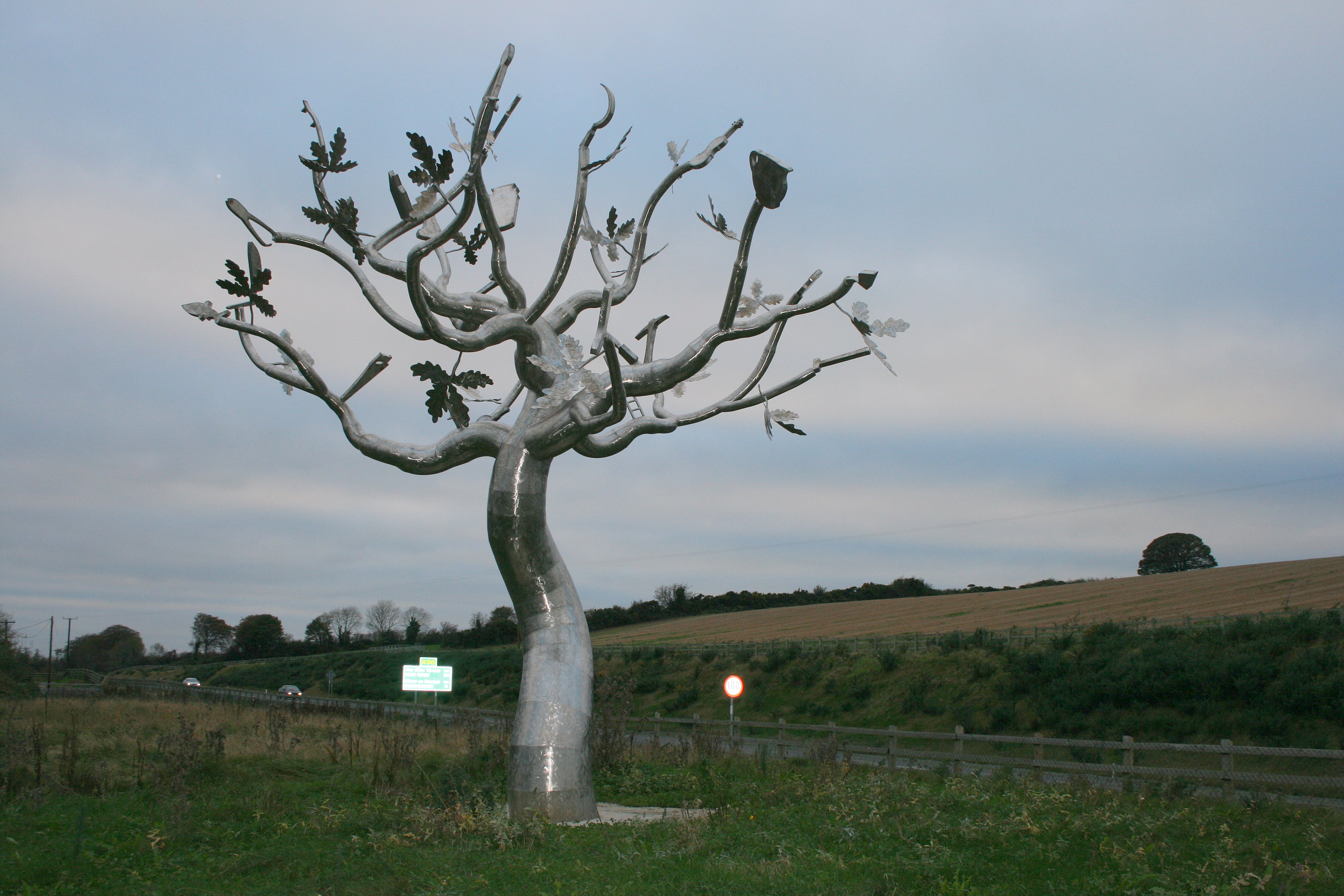
Silver Oak on the N30

The route had its first major improvement in 1986, when a new road that was constructed from Ballyanne to Scarke opened. The road was constructed on the embankment of the former Macmine Junction to New Ross branch railway line, which had closed in 1963. The railway had then subsequently been dismantled, and most of the land had been sold to adjacent landowners by CIÉ, but some of the land on the route was sold to Wexford County Council in late 1960s for the purpose of future road realignment.

The original northeastern terminus of the N79 was where it met the N11 in Enniscorthy at the junction of Slaney Place, the southern end of the Island Road, the northern end of Abbey Quay, and the western side of Enniscorthy Bridge.

In 1991, a new traffic layout was implemented in Enniscorthy after the completion of the Seamus Rafter Bridge, and all northbound traffic on the N11 began to flow through the new bridge and Abbey Quay, and all southbound traffic via the old bridge and Templeshannon Quay. The new northeastern terminus of the N79 was the new junction where Abbey Square met the southern end of Abbey Quay and the Seamus Rafter Bridge. The route no longer ran through Slaney Place.

The original southwestern terminus of the N79 was where it met the N25 at the junction of O'Hanrahan Bridge with the Quay in New Ross. By 1994, the road had been rerouted through the Irishtown and the terminus of the road was moved to Kent's Cross on the N25 on the outskirts of the town.

The route was legally redesignated as the N30 national primary road in 1994.

In 2006, the N30 Moneytucker to Jamestown scheme opened, in which 5.3 km of new improved single carriageway road with hard shoulders, better junctions, and overbridges and underbridges, was constructed south of the existing road.

On 18 July 2019, 4 km of dual carriageway road were officially opened as part of the M11 Gorey to Enniscorthy PPP Scheme. The 8 km of single carriageway road were opened on 14 August 2019.

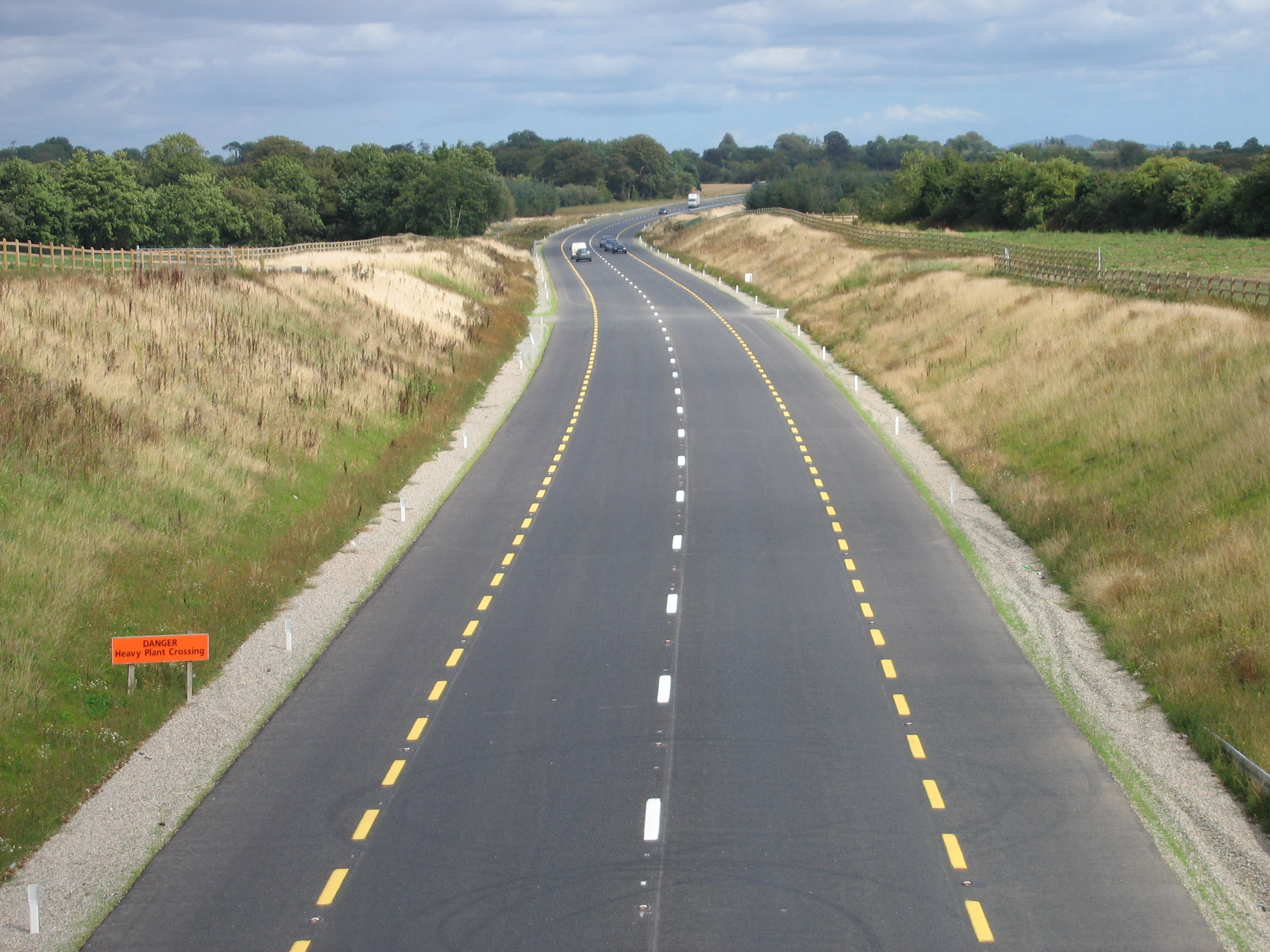
N30 east of Clonroche, looking east

On 29 January 2020, a 5 km segment of dual carriageway, roundabouts, and a 1.2 km single carriageway were officially opened as part of the N25 New Ross Bypass PPP Scheme, which also forms part of the N30.

This has replaced the western most 8 km of the former N30 road between Corcoran's Cross and its former terminus with the N25, and the segments of the road have been redesignated as either wholly or partly as regional roads or local roads after the opening of the scheme. The N30 currently terminates at the N25 east of New Ross and is around 3 km shorter than before.

== Proposed developments ==
There are suspended plans for the future N30 Moneytucker to New Ross, a proposed 14.4 km road improvement that is to realign most of the current road and to provide a southern bypass of Clonroche, to be constructed between the eastern end of the New Ross Bypass near Corcoran's Cross Roundabout and the western end of the N30 Moneytucker to Jamestown Scheme.

== See also ==
- Roads in Ireland
- Motorways in Ireland
- National secondary road
- Regional road
