= Black Rock Mountain, County Wexford =

Mountain in Ireland

Black Rock Mountain
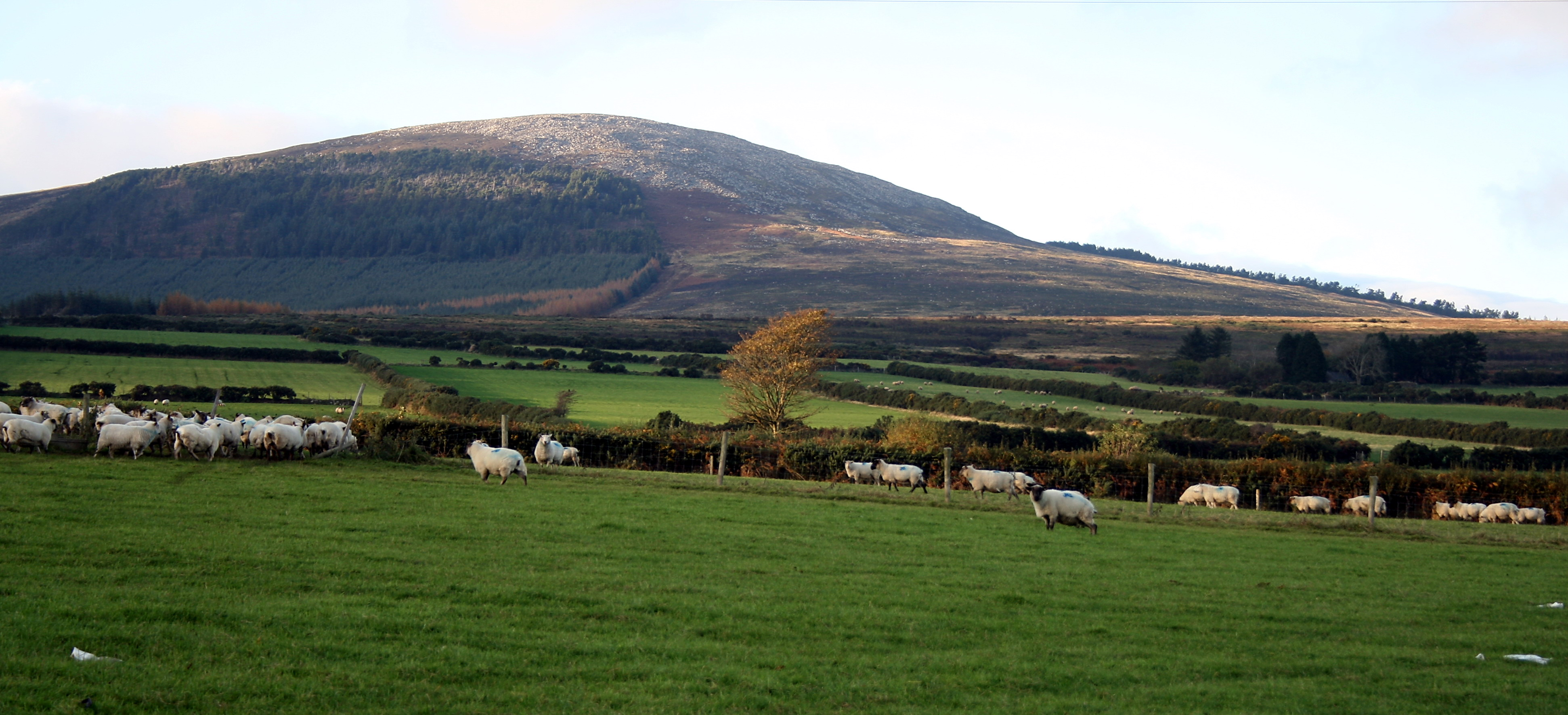
- From the south-east

Highest point
- Elevation: 599 m (1,965 ft)
- Coordinates: 52.6174°N 6.7281°W

Naming
- Native name: An Charraig Dhubh Thuaidh

Geography
- Location within island of Ireland
- Location: County Wexford, Ireland
- Parent range: Blackstairs Mountains
- Topo map: OSi Discovery 68

Black Rock Mountain (Irish: An Charraig Dhubh Thuaidh) is a mountain in Ireland. It is in the Blackstairs Mountains, on the Carlow-Wexford border.

The Blackstairs are divided into two massifs, to the north Mount Leinster and to the south Blackstairs Mountain. Black Rock is the terminal peak of the eastern shoulder of Mount Leinster.

== See also ==
- List of mountains in Ireland
