= B.A.R.E in the Woods =

Annual Award-winning Music festival in Ireland

BARE in the Woods
- Nickname: BARE Festival
- Status: Defunct
- Genre: Music festival
- Purpose: Music, comedy and spoken word
- Frequency: Annual
- Venue: Garryhinch Woods (2014–2016, 2017 cancellation); Borris House (2018)
- Locations: Portarlington, County Laois (2014–2016); County Carlow (2018)
- Country: Ireland
- Years active: 2014–2018
- Inaugurated: 2014
- Most recent: 7 July 2018

BARE in the Woods (also known as BARE Festival) was an Irish music festival held between 2014 and 2018. Initially staged at Garryhinch Woods near Portarlington, County Laois, the festival's name was an acronym for "Bringing Another Righteous Event". The inaugural event in 2014 featured Irish acts including The Eskies, Phantom, Liza Flume, Corner Boy and New Secret Weapon. The festival subsequently expanded from a one-day event to a three-day festival, featuring international performers including Kiesza, Right Said Fred, House of Pain and Helmet in its 2017 line-up.

In 2017, the festival was cancelled after its organisers encountered difficulties securing a licence for a planned expansion to a capacity of 10,000 people. In a statement, they cited what they described as unattainable conditions, extraordinary fees and unachievable deadlines, and said they had surrendered their licence to protect the festival's future. The cancellation followed three consecutive sold-out years and resulted in financial losses and delays in processing ticket refunds. The organisers subsequently announced that the festival would relocate to Borris House in County Carlow, where it returned on 6 and 7 July 2018. The 2018 line-up included Obie Trice, members of D12, God Is an Astronaut, Kíla, Natty Wailer and Seamus Fogarty. BARE in the Woods won the Best One Day Festival award at the Irish Festival Awards in 2016 and 2017.
