= R735 road (Ireland) =

Road in Ireland

R735 road
- Bóthar R735

Route information
- Length: 24.1 km (15.0 mi)

Major junctions
- From: R734 at Dunmain, County Wexford

- R736 at Newbawn; N25 at Scullaboge
- To: N30 at Ballymackesy

Location
- Country: Ireland

Highway system
- Roads in Ireland; Motorways; Primary; Secondary; Regional
| ← R734 | → R736 |

The R735 road is a regional road in County Wexford, Ireland. It connects the R734 road to the N30 road, via the villages of Newbawn and Adamstown. The R735 is 24.1 kilometres (15.0 mi) long.
