= R729 road (Ireland) =

Road in Ireland

R729 road
- Bóthar R729
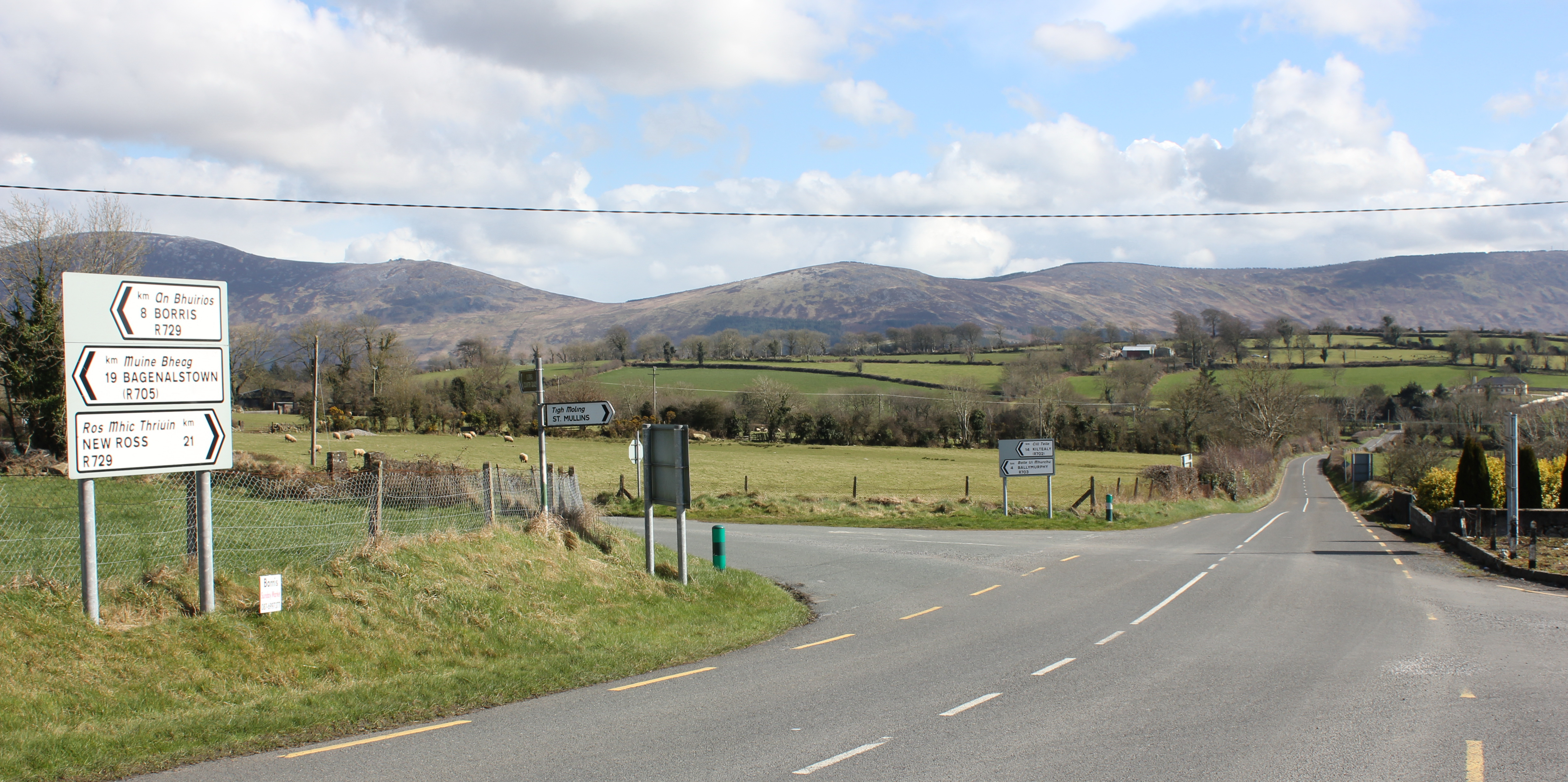
- The R729 intersecting the R703 near St. Mullin's, with the Blackstairs Mountains in the background.

Route information
- Length: 22.1 km (13.7 mi)

Location
- Country: Ireland
- Primary destinations: County Carlow; Leaves the R702 road; R703 road; Crosses the Aughavaud River; Glynn; County Wexford; Crosses the Poulmonty River; R731 road; Terminates at the R714.

Highway system
- Roads in Ireland; Motorways; Primary; Secondary; Regional

The R729 road is a regional road in County Carlow and County Wexford in Ireland. It connects the R702 near Borris to the R714 near New Ross, 22.1 km (13.7 mi) to the south (map of route).

The government legislation that defines the R729, the Roads Act 1993 (Classification of Regional Roads) Order 2019 (Statutory Instrument 577 of 2019), provides the following official description:

Borris, County Carlow – New Ross, County Wexford

Between its junction with R702 at Barmona in the county of Carlow and its junction with R714 at Macmurroughsisland in the county of Wexford via Coolnamara and Glynn in the county of Carlow: Pollmounty Bridge at the boundary between the county of Carlow and the county of Wexford: and Ballynabanoge in the county of Wexford.

== See also ==
- Roads in Ireland
- Motorways in Ireland
- National primary road
- National secondary road
- Trunk roads in Ireland
- Road signs in Ireland
