= Raheen, County Wexford =

Village in County Wexford, Ireland

Raheen An Ráithín
- Village
- Location in Ireland
- Coordinates: 52°23′31″N 6°47′38″W
- Country: Ireland
- Province: Leinster
- County: County Wexford
- Elevation: 48 m (157 ft)
- Time zone: UTC+0 (WET)
  - Summer (DST): UTC-1 (IST (WEST))
- Irish Grid Reference: S821273

Raheen (Irish: An Ráithín, meaning 'small ringfort') is a townland and village in County Wexford, Ireland. It lies 27 km from Wexford, 11 km from New Ross, and 23 km from Enniscorthy.

== History ==
Raheen, in Irish An Ráithín, means 'little rath or ringfort'. There are several ringfort (rath) sites in the area, including in the townlands of Raheennahennedy, Raheenarostia, Raheenaclonagh and Courthoyle New.

For most of the Norman period, the area was controlled by the Howell family. They gave their name to nearby "Courthoyle", where they had a chapel and castle.

During the Irish Rebellion of 1798, one of the main rebel camps was located at nearby Carrigbyrne Hill.

A Roman Catholic (R.C.) church previously existed at Courthoyle, near the village of Raheen. The current R.C. church of Raheen dates from 1814.

A Protestant church that once existed in the townland of Templeshelin (located about 1 km away) has since been demolished. This belonged to the former Church of Ireland parish of Adamstown. The adjacent cemetery is still in existence and contains some of the victims of the Scullabogue barn fire that took place during the Irish Rebellion of 1798, as well as a small number of other graves.

== Amenities ==
Raheen village has a national (primary) school, a shop, a Roman Catholic church, a childcare centre, a community centre, and several houses. There is also a cemetery located about half a kilometre away at Courthoyle. Raheen's Catholic church, a curacy, is part of the Catholic parish of Newbawn. The parish church is located at Newbawn.

== Sport ==
The local Gaelic Athletic Association (GAA) club is Adamstown GAA Club. The club's main pitch is located at Adamstown, about 3–4 km away. However, there is another pitch located at Newbawn that is sometimes also used. Rounders is also played in Raheen.

== See also ==
- List of towns and villages in Ireland
