= Clonroche =

Village in County Wexford, Ireland

Clonroche Cluain an Róistigh
- Village
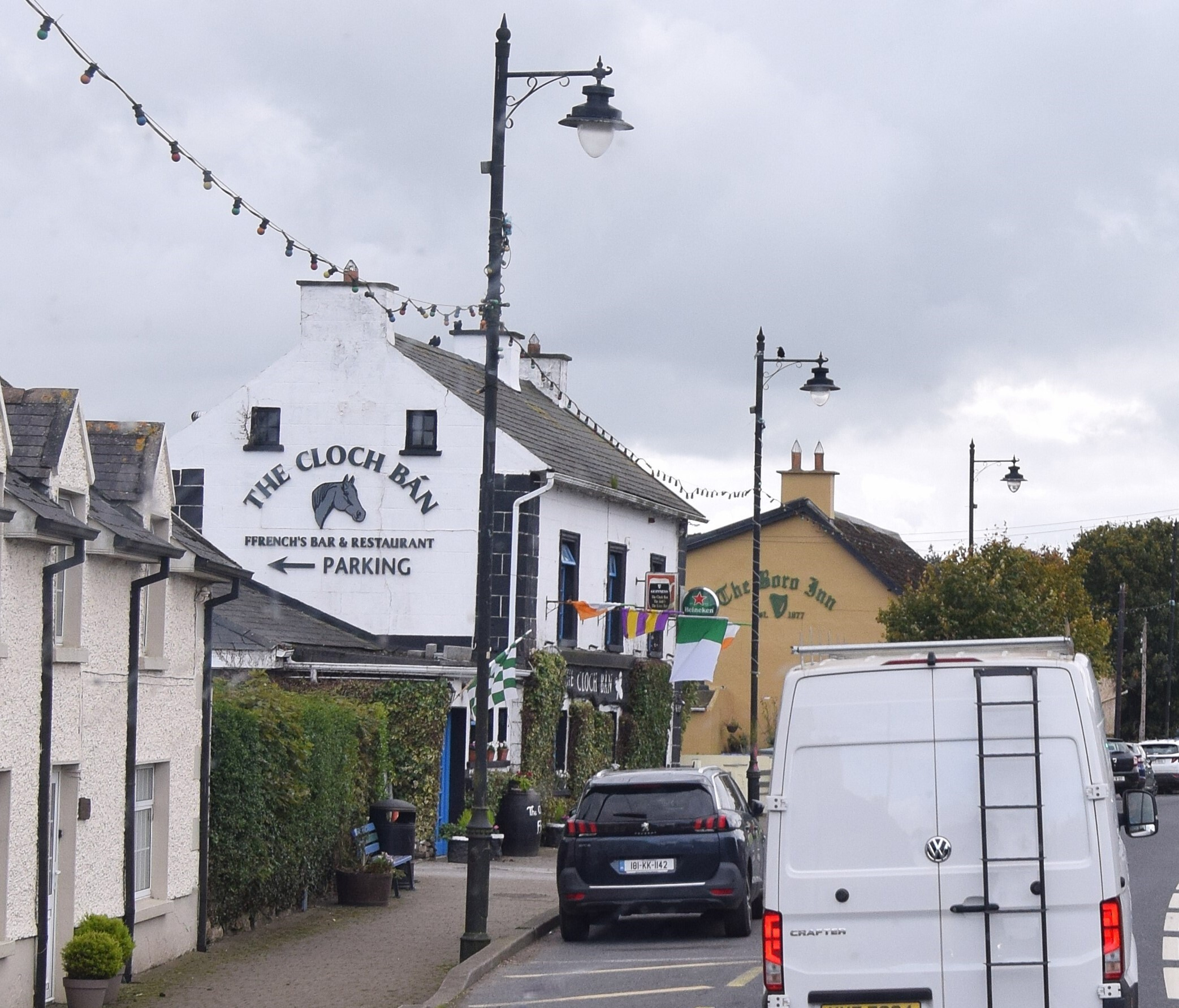
- The N30 passes through Clonroche

- Location in Ireland
- Coordinates: 52°27′02″N 6°42′50″W
- Country: Ireland
- Province: Leinster
- County: County Wexford

Population (2016)
  - Total: 326
- Time zone: UTC+0 (WET)
  - Summer (DST): UTC-1 (IST (WEST))
- Irish Grid Reference: S869399

Clonroche (Irish: Cluain an Róistigh, meaning 'Roches' pasture') is a village in County Wexford, Ireland. It is around 11 km (7 mi) south-west of Enniscorthy and 17 km (11 mi) north-east of New Ross, and is on the N30 national primary route.

== History ==
From the mid-17th century until the early 20th century, the village of Clonroche was located on the large estate owned by the Carew family of nearby Ballyboro (later renamed Castleboro). From the 18th century onwards, their seat was Castleboro House, and a notable head of this family was Robert Carew (1787–1856).

Rev. James Bentley Gordon, who was Protestant rector of Killegney in 1798, wrote an account of the Irish Rebellion of 1798 and also wrote an account of the parishes of Killegney and Chapel that appeared in William Shaw Mason's Statistical Account or Parochial Survey of Ireland, printed in 1814.

A later author, Patrick Kennedy was also connected with Clonroche and the surrounding area (in his youth he attended school in Cloughbawn, in the townland of Clonroche, and resided in Castleboro and Courtnacuddy townlands). He wrote of the locality and its people (e.g., the clerics of Killegney parish) in Banks of the Boro (1856). The Boro from the title is a small river that flows through the nearby countryside.

On 27 April 1920 the RIC barracks located in Clonroche was attacked by the IRA during the Irish War of Independence

== Cloughbawn parish ==
Clonroche is located in the Roman Catholic (RC) parish of Cloughbawn, in the Roman Catholic Diocese of Ferns. Cloughbawn RC Parish church is located at the edge of the village of Clonroche. Poulpeasty, 5 km away, is also in the RC parish of Cloughbawn, and has its own church and curate.

Cloughbawn in Irish means "the white rock" and the village is situated at the foot of the Blackstairs Mountains. Surrounding townlands include Poulpeasty, Kilegney, Chapel, Castleboro, Ballyboro, Rathturtin, Tominearly, Meelgarrow, Raheen and Rathfardon, which stretches to the borders of Adamstown and Rathnure parishes.

There is also a Protestant church located about a kilometre from the village of Clonroche at Killegney. This Church of Ireland (COI) church was formerly part of the COI parish of Killegney, but today it is part of the United Parishes of Killegney, Rossdroit, Killane and Templeshanbo.

== Amenities ==
Clonroche village has two local stores and two pubs. Other retail outlets include a petrol station and a chemist. The local creamery provides services and products for the surrounding agricultural community. Local produce includes potatoes, strawberries, cereals, dairy products and pumpkins. Clonroche hosts an annual steam rally.

The local Gaelic Athletic Association club is Cloughbawn GAA Club. The club's hurling team competes at senior level, and reached the Wexford Senior Hurling Championship final in 2002 and 2016.

== Notable people ==
- Tim Flood, hurler with Cloughbawn GAA Club and Wexford
- Larry Murphy, hurler with Cloughbawn GAA Club and Wexford
- Walter O'Brien, founder and CEO of Scorpion Computer Services and an executive producer on the CBS television series Scorpion

== See also ==
- List of towns and villages in Ireland
