= R732 road (Ireland) =

Regional road in County Wexford, Ireland

Coordinates: 52°39′50″N 6°16′41″W

R732 road
- Bóthar R732
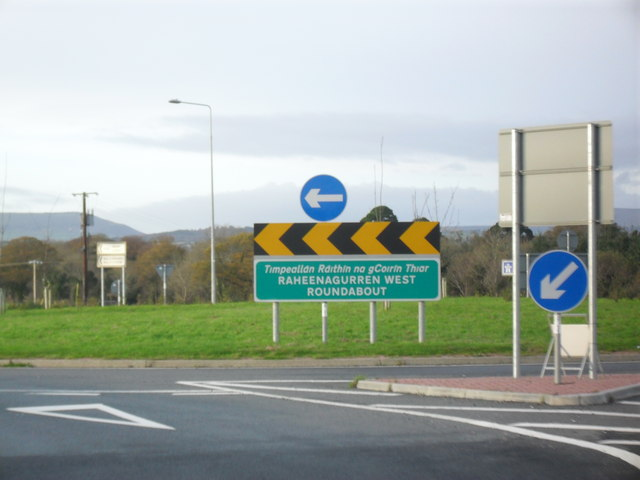
- Raheenagurren West Roundabout, the eastern end of the R732

Route information
- Length: 2.2 km (1.4 mi)

Major junctions
- From: R741 Coolnaveagh
- M11 Exit 23
- To: R742 Raheenagurren East

Location
- Country: Ireland

Highway system
- Roads in Ireland; Motorways; Primary; Secondary; Regional
| ← R731 | → R733 |

The R732 road is a regional road in County Wexford, Ireland. It connects the R741 and R742 regional roads to junction 23 of the M11 motorway, providing access to Gorey town centre from the motorway.
