= Castleboro House =

Ruined Georgian house in County Wexford, Ireland

Coordinates: 52.4804°N 6.7258°W

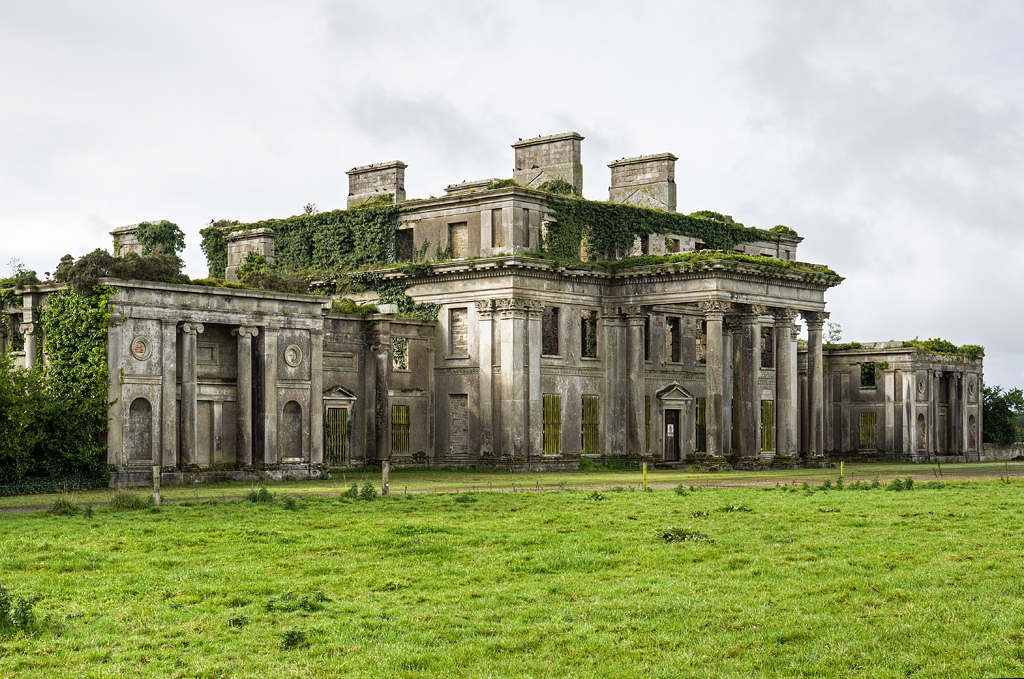
- The house in 2023
- Interactive map of the Castleboro House area

General information
- Status: Private dwelling house
- Type: House
- Classification: Derelict
- Location: County Wexford, Clonroche, Ireland
- Elevation: 50 m (160 ft)
- Estimated completion: 1783
- Renovated: 1840-58 (after fire)

Height
- Height: 30 m (98 ft)

Technical details
- Material: granite

Design and construction
- Architect: Daniel Robertson
- Developer: Robert Shapland Carew (1780)
- Other designers: Martin Day (1840)

Castleboro House is a derelict stately home near Clonroche, County Wexford, Ireland.

== History ==
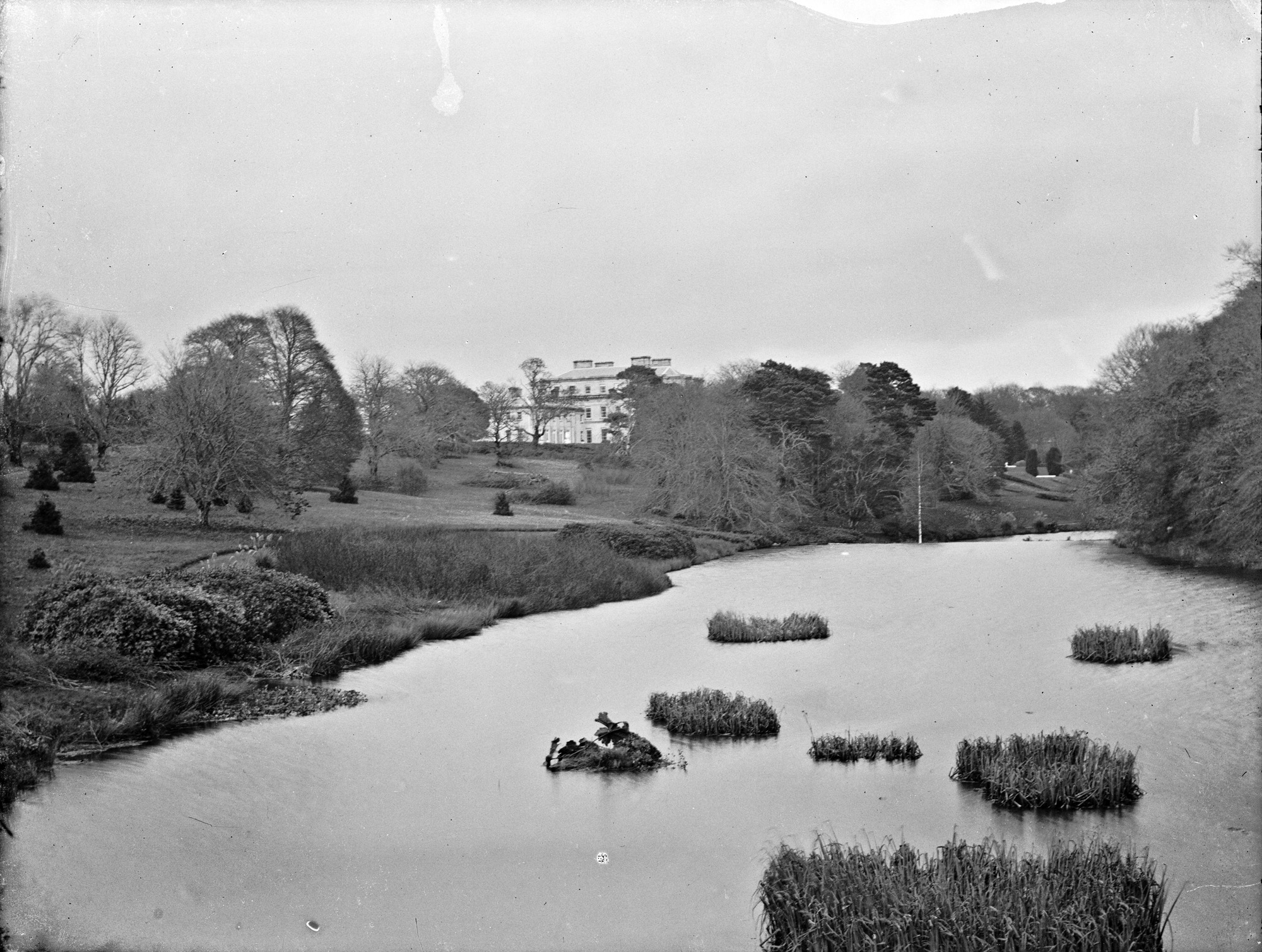
Castleboro House from the Boro river circa 1900.

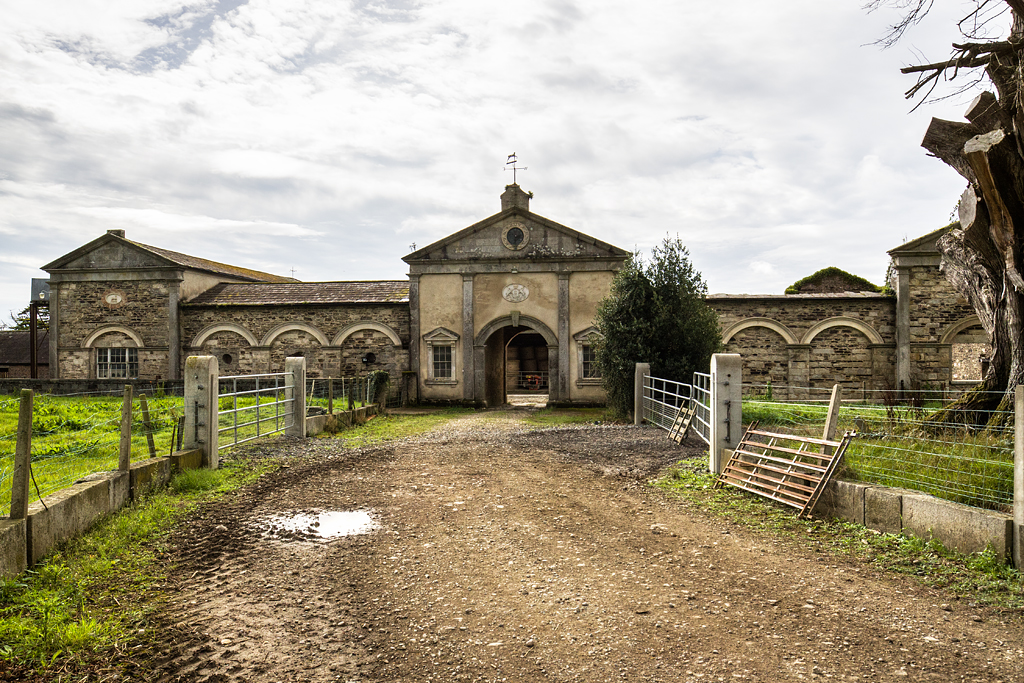
The stable complex at Castleboro.

It was originally built around 1783 for Robert Shapland Carew, father of Robert Carew, 1st Baron Carew, who was an Irish Whig Party politician and landowner.

In 1837, Samuel Lewis refers to the house as "the spacious modern mansion of Lord Carew" in his Topographical Dictionary of Ireland.

An accidental fire took place in 1839 and destroyed all but the west wing. It was rebuilt from 1840 to 1858 in a neo Palladian style to the design of the English architect Daniel Robertson. The granite gate lodges appear to have been constructed approximately 20 years after the house.

The house was refurbished and restored in 1908.The house was noted as being in occasional use in 1911 with only 3 servants residents at the time of the census. The house is later noted as closed in 1921.

On 5 February 1923 the house was burnt down by local IRA (Irish Republican Army) supporters during the Irish Civil War and was part of a larger series of the Destruction of Irish country houses (1919–1923). Only three of the rooms were furnished, the remainder of the contents having been sold in May 1921.

In 1926, the demesne is noted as occupied by husband and wife William and Anna Livingstone.

The remaining estate was later converted to farmland and the ruins of the house still stand as of 2026 and are in private ownership.
