= Daniel Robertson (architect) =

British architect

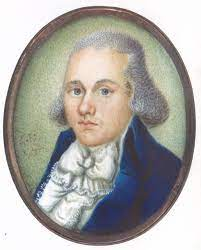
- Born: 1778; Charleston, South Carolina
- Died: 1849 (aged 70–71)
- Occupation: Architect

Daniel Robertson (died 1849) was a British architect active in Britain and Ireland during the first half of the 19th century.

== Personal life ==
Robertson was born in Charleston, South Carolina the son of Andrew Robertson (1733–1791) and his wife Helen (née Crawford) who had died in 1778, which is presumably the year of Daniel's birth.

He married Amelia Helen Clarke in 1808 and had twelve children including Arthur.

== Career ==
Robertson may have worked under Robert Adam in London and along with his brother Alexander, Robertson was involved in the construction of warehouses for the West India Docks for the youngest Adam brother, William, a builder and developer in 1800.

Both Robertson brothers were finally declared bankrupt in 1817 and ultimately, Adam refused to work with the Robertsons because of their irresponsibility and dishonesty and went as far as signing a formal undertaking breaking off the relationship in 1821.

Later he worked at Kew and Oxford. Robertson was an early exponent of the Norman Revival, designing both St Clement's Church, Oxford and St Swithun's parish church in Kennington, Berkshire (now in Oxfordshire) in this style as early as 1828.

=== Move to Ireland ===
Robertson then moved to Ireland in the early 1830s, where he had considerable success and carried out commissions for notable country houses particularly in the southeastern part of the country. His work was in both the Neoclassical style and then in the Gothic Revival style of the 1830s with which he may be most associated.

By the 1840s while working on Powerscourt House, he was said by Lord Powerscourt to be "always in debt and…used to hide in the domes of the roof of the house' to escape the Sheriff's officers who pursued him". He was also said to be in an advanced state of alcoholism and had gout and died soon after in 1849.

== Works ==
Robertson's buildings include:

=== England ===
- Oriel College, Oxford: west range of St. Mary's Quad, 1826
- Wadham College, Oxford: fireplace in hall, 1826
- Oxford University Press, Oxford, 1826-30
- St. Clement's parish church, Oxford, 1828
- St. Swithun's parish church, Kennington, Berkshire (now Oxfordshire), 1828

=== Ireland ===
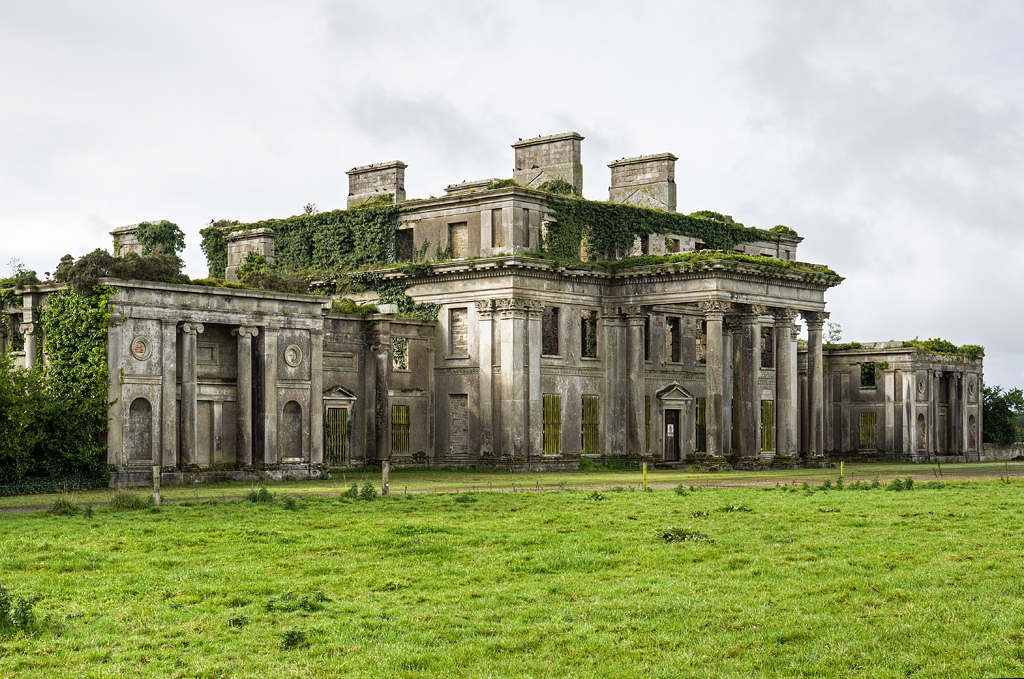
Castleboro House, Castleboro Demesne, County Wexford

- Castleboro House, County Wexford (home of the Carew family)
- Dunleckney Manor, County Carlow (seat of the Bagenal and Newton families)
- Lisnavagh House, County Carlow (seat of the McClintock-Bunbury family, Baron Rathdonnell)
- Johnstown Castle, Co. Wexford (home of the Grogan Morgan family)
- Wilton Castle in Co. Wexford (home of the Alcock family)
- Wells House, Wells, Gorey Co. Wexford.
- St. Matthias' Church, Hatch Street, Dublin, 1842.
- Ballinkeele House (home of the Maher family)
- Bloomfield Castle in County Wexford
- Carrigglas Manor in County Longford (owned by Thomas Langlois Lefroy, Chief Justice of Ireland from 1852 to 1866)

=== Gardens and landscapes ===
In addition to numerous major country house commissions, Robertson was also particularly noted as a landscape designer. His greatest accomplishments in that field were at Powerscourt and Killruddery, both of which capture long-distance views of the Great Sugar Loaf mountain in County Wicklow. Wells House also has plans of the gardens designed there by Daniel Robertson.

== Sources and further reading ==
- Colvin, H.M. (1997) [1954]. A Biographical Dictionary of British Architects, 1600-1840. New Haven: Yale University Press. pp. not stated. ISBN 0-300-07207-4.
- Pevsner, Nikolaus (1966). Berkshire. The Buildings of England. Harmondsworth: Penguin Books. p. 159.
- Sherwood, Jennifer; Pevsner, Nikolaus (1974). Oxfordshire. The Buildings of England. Harmondsworth: Penguin Books. pp. 53, 91, 180, 216, 274, 291. ISBN 0-14-071045-0.
