= R734 road (Ireland) =

Road in Ireland

R734 road
- Bóthar R734
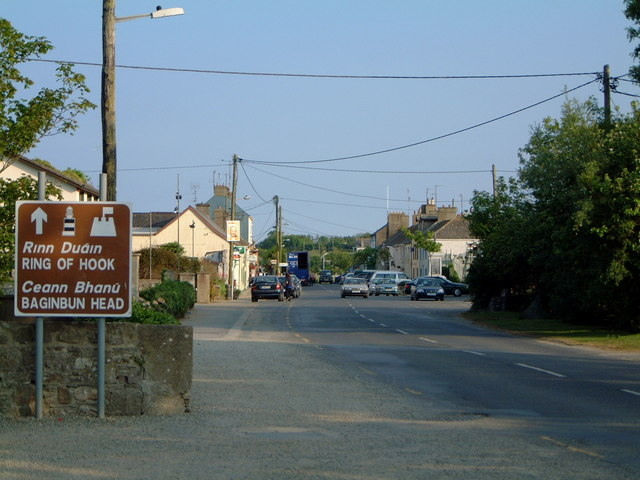
- Main Street, Fethard on the R734

Route information
- Length: 32.0 km (19.9 mi)

Major junctions
- From: R733 at Slaght, County Wexford

- R735 at Dunmain; R733 at Balliniry
- To: Hook Head Lighthouse

Location
- Country: Ireland

Highway system
- Roads in Ireland; Motorways; Primary; Secondary; Regional
← R733	→ R735

The R734 road is a regional road in County Wexford, Ireland. It travels from the R733 road at Slaght to Hook Head Lighthouse via the village of Fethard-on-Sea. The R734 is 32.0 kilometres (19.9 mi) long.
