= R769 road (Ireland) =

Road in Ireland

Coordinates: 52.341332°N 6.490888°W

R769 road
- Bóthar R769
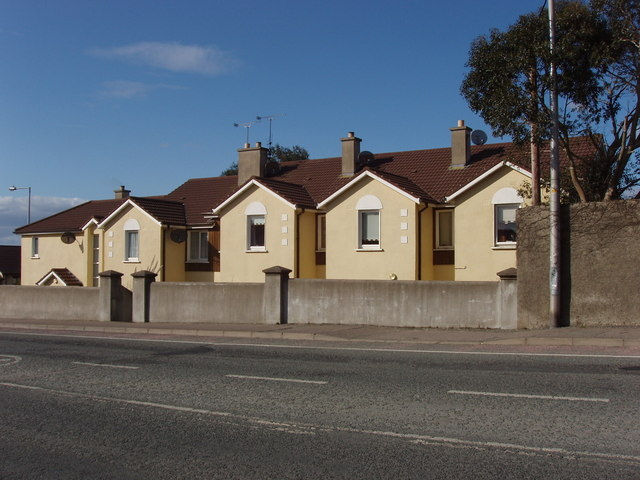
- Houses on the Newtown Road, part of the R769

Route information
- Length: 29.9 km (18.6 mi)

Major junctions
- From: N25 / N11 Ballindinas
- R889 Wexford (Upper John Street)
- To: R730 Wexford

Location
- Country: Ireland

Highway system
- Roads in Ireland; Motorways; Primary; Secondary; Regional

The R769 road is a regional road in Ireland, located in County Wexford. It forms the pre-bypass route of the N25 into Wexford town.
