= Croaghaun, County Carlow =

Mountain in County Carlow, Ireland

Croaghaun
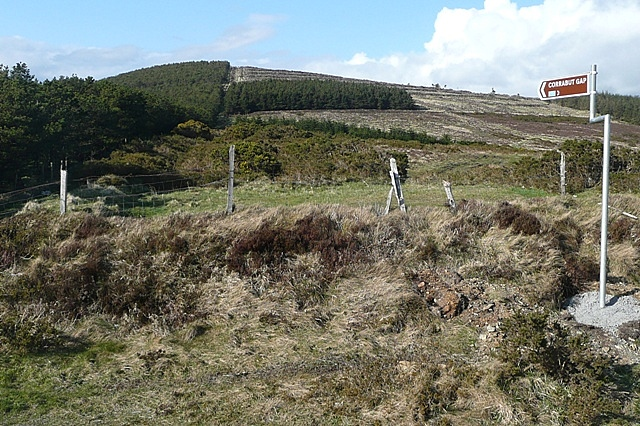
- Towards Croaghaun (photo taken from Corrbut Gap)

Highest point
- Elevation: 455 m (1,493 ft)
- Prominence: 120 m (390 ft)
- Coordinates: 52.6636°N 6.7675°W

Naming
- Native name: Cruachán

Geography
- Location within island of Ireland
- Location: County Carlow, Ireland
- Parent range: Blackstairs Mountains

Croaghaun (Irish: Cruachán) is a mountain in County Carlow, Ireland, one of the Blackstairs Mountains.

Croaghaun is the most northerly summit in the Blackstairs Mountains. It is the 603rd highest summit in Ireland.

== See also ==
- List of mountains in Ireland
