= R731 road (Ireland) =

Road in Ireland

R731 road
- Bóthar R731
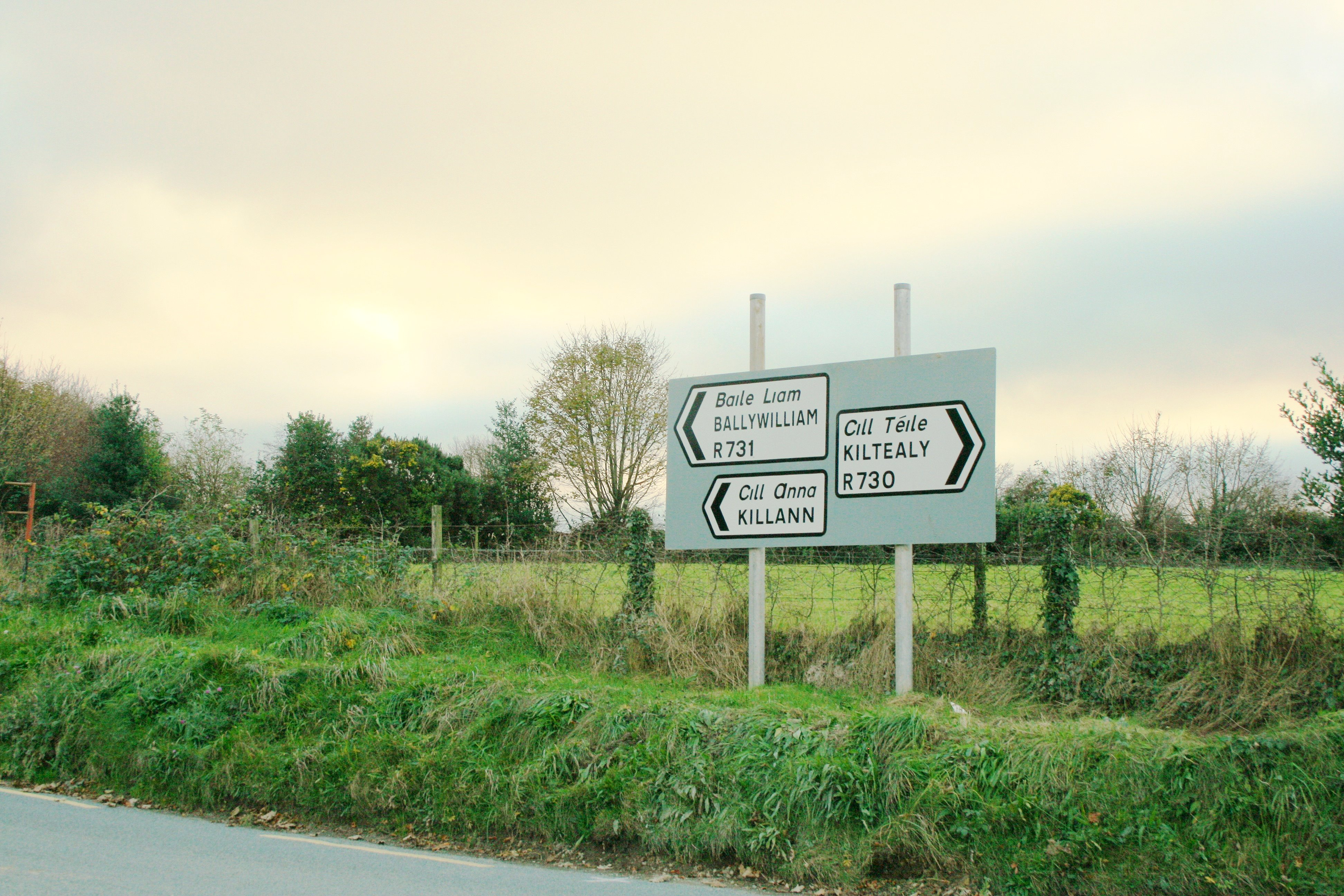
- The R731 at its junction with the R730

Route information
- Length: 17 km (11 mi)

Location
- Country: Ireland
- Primary destinations: County Wexford; Leave the R730; Killann; Rathnure; Ballywilliam; Terminates at the R729 north of New Ross.

Highway system
- Roads in Ireland; Motorways; Primary; Secondary; Regional

The R731 road is a regional road in County Wexford, Ireland. From its junction with the R730 it takes a route along the southeasterly flank of the Blackstairs Mountains to its junction with the R729 north of New Ross, where it terminates.

En route it passes through the villages of Killann, Rathnure and Ballywilliam. The road is 17 km (11 mi) long.

== See also ==
- Roads in Ireland
- National primary road
- National secondary road
