= R737 road (Ireland) =

Road in Ireland

R737 road
- Bóthar R737
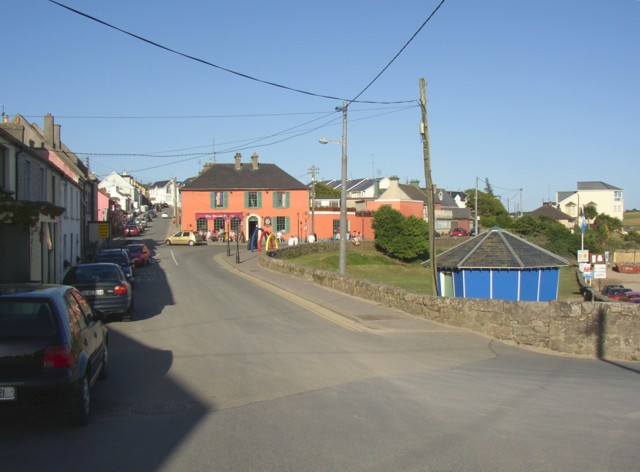
- R737 near beach at Duncannon, County Wexford

Route information
- Length: 4.7 km (2.9 mi)

Major junctions
- From: R733 at Haggard, County Wexford
- To: Pier at Duncannon

Location
- Country: Ireland

Highway system
- Roads in Ireland; Motorways; Primary; Secondary; Regional
← R736	→ R738

The R737 road is a regional road in County Wexford, Ireland. It travels from the R733 road at Haggard to the pier at Duncannon. The R737 is 4.7 kilometres (2.9 mi) long.
