= R733 road (Ireland) =

Road in Ireland

R733 road
- Bóthar R733
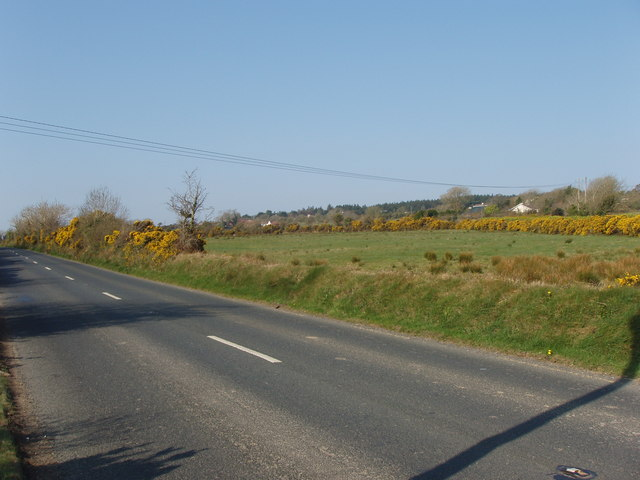
- R733 at Mullanour, County Wexford

Route information
- Length: 56.1 km (34.9 mi)

Major junctions
- From: R723 at Oaklands, New Ross, County Wexford

- N25 at Camlin; R734 at Slaght; R770 at Arthurstown; R737 at Haggard; R734 at Balliniry; R736 at Wellingtonbridge; R738 at Waddingtown; N25 at Duncannon Road Roundabout, Wexford

- To: R730 at Trinity Street, Wexford

Location
- Country: Ireland

Highway system
- Roads in Ireland; Motorways; Primary; Secondary; Regional
← R732	→ R734

The R733 road, locally known as the Duncannon or New Line, is a regional road in County Wexford, Ireland. It travels from New Ross to Wexford. In November 2019, the road's New Ross junctions were amended for the N25 New Ross Bypass project.

The R733 goes south from New Ross to Arthurstown. From there the road turns east to Wexford via Wellingtonbridge. The R733 is 56.1 km (34.9 mi) long.
