= Redcross =

Village in County Wicklow, Ireland

Redcross Irish: An Chrois Dhearg
- Village
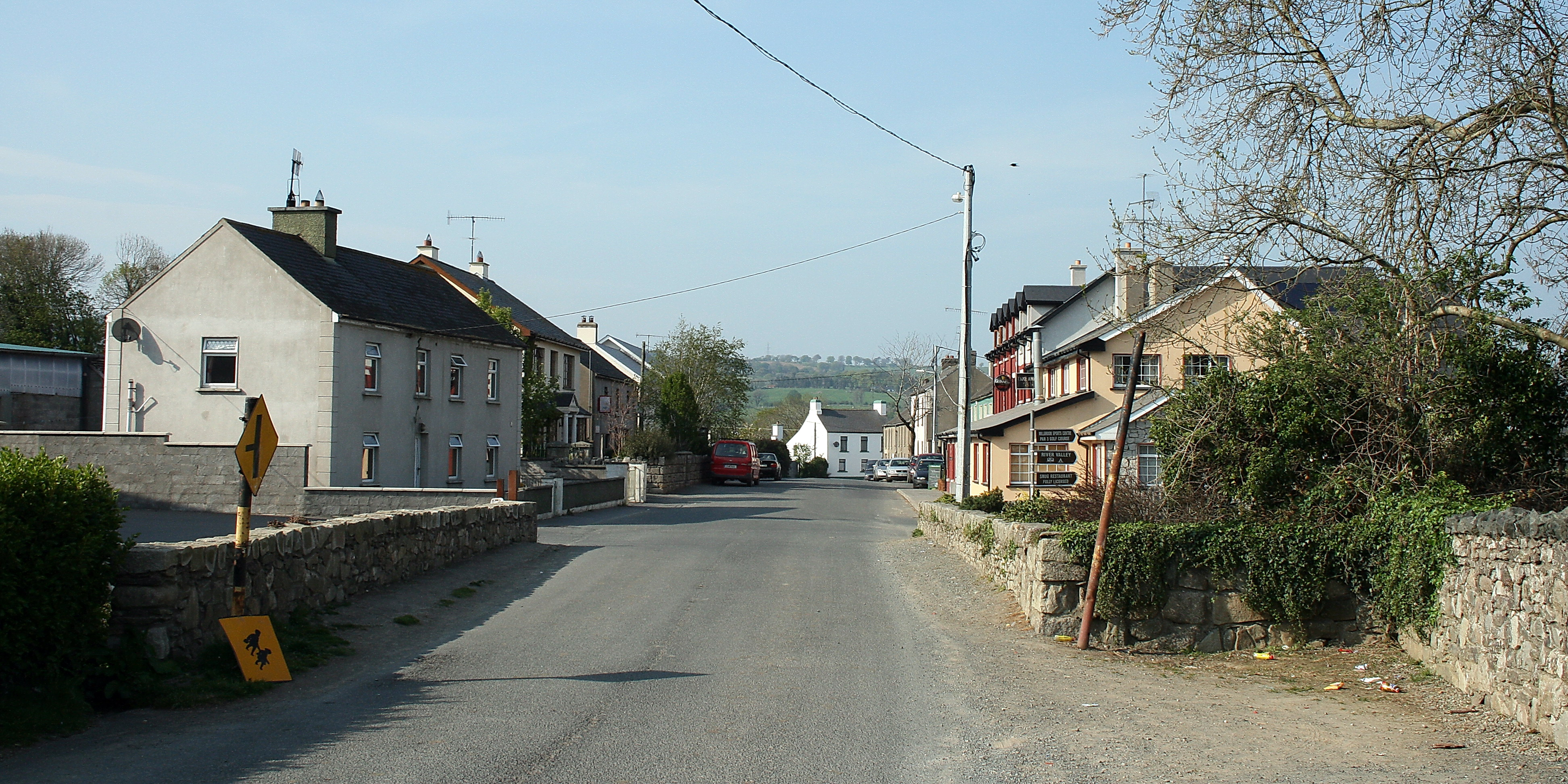
- Redcross on the R754 regional road

- Location in Ireland
- Coordinates: 52°52′59″N 6°09′00″W
- Country: Ireland
- Province: Leinster
- County: County Wicklow

Population (2022)
  - Total: 256
- Time zone: UTC+0 (WET)
  - Summer (DST): UTC-1 (IST (WEST))
- Irish Grid Reference: T246838

Redcross (Irish: An Chrois Dhearg, formerly Baile Domhnaill Rua) is a village and also a civil parish in County Wicklow, Ireland. It lies on the R754 regional road, about 3 km (2 mi) east of the N11 national primary route.

== Townlands ==
The civil parish of Redcross comprises the following 28 townlands: Ballintim, Ballinvally Lower, Ballinvally Upper, Ballydonnell, Ballygillaroe, Ballykean (Annesley), Ballykean (Penrose), Ballykean (Stringer), Ballynamona, Ballyrogan Lower, Ballyrogan Upper, Blindwood, Chapel, Coolanearl, Crone Lower, Crone Upper, Kilmacrea Lower, Kilmacrea Upper, Kilmacoo, Kilmurry North, Kilmurry South, Oghil Lower, Oghil Upper, Rahaval, Redcross, Springfarm, Templelyon Lower, and Templelyon Upper.

== Village ==
Redcross is a small village set amongst a number of low hills. The R754 passes through the village and there is a post office, two shops and a public house, as well as two caravan parks. Amenities include a golf course, a sports hall, tennis courts, a bowling ground and a wine bar. The church, a small building without a tower or spire, was built in 1829, when the parishes of Kilbride, Dunganstown and Castlemacadam were united.

== Notable visitors ==
The philosopher Ludwig Wittgenstein stayed at a farmhouse in Redcross in 1948 after inspecting it and deciding he could work well there. Here he was occasionally visited by his friend the Irish psychiatrist Maurice O'Connor Drury. Wittgenstein said that his work was benefited by living here as "I could never have got this work done while I was in Cambridge". Durganstown is the ancestral home of the American President John F. Kennedy.

The village Redcross has been used for the setting of a number of films, one of these being Durango, based on a book by John B. Keane.

== See also ==
- List of towns and villages in Ireland
