= Blackstairs Mountain =

Mountain in Ireland

- An Staighre Dubh
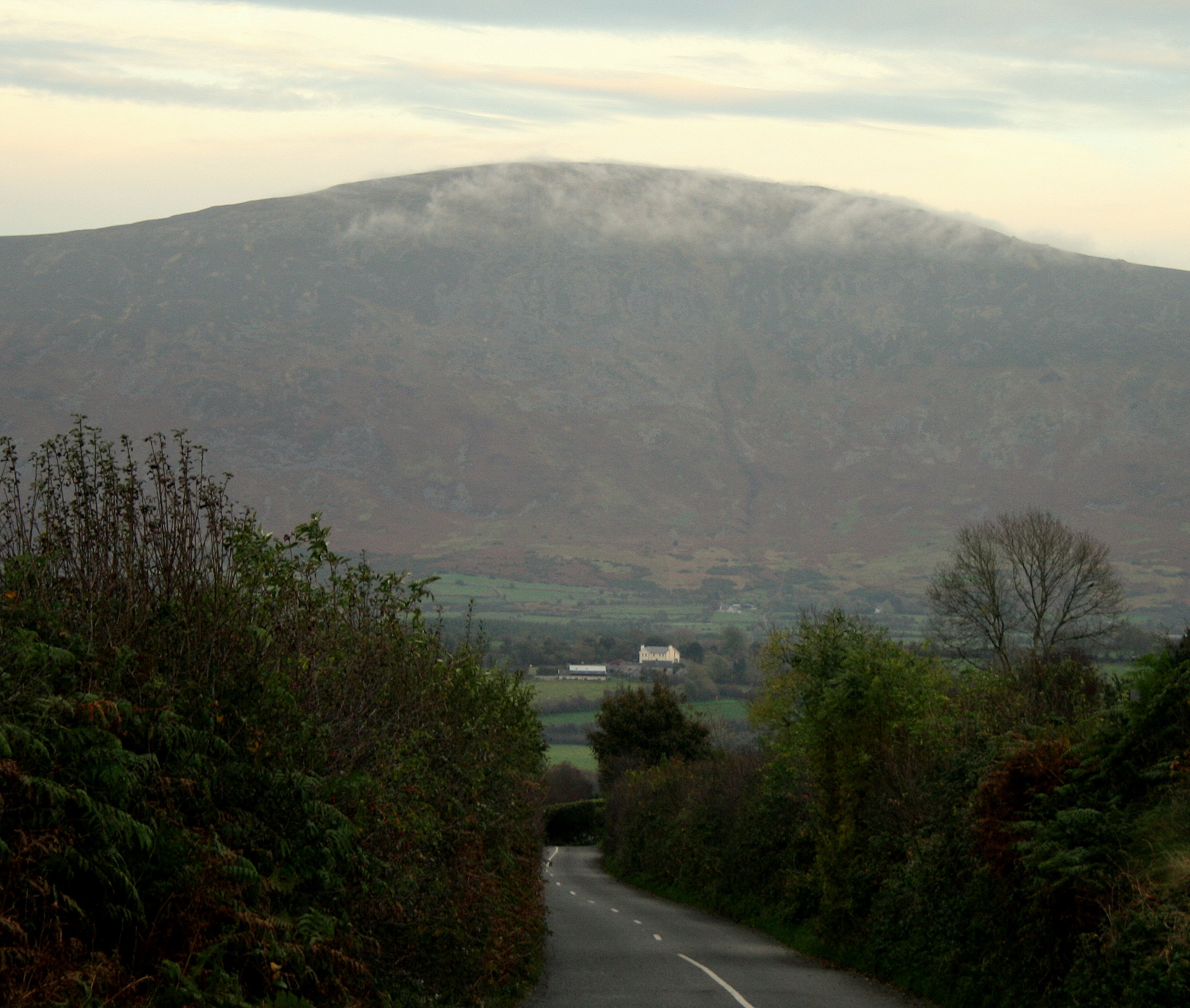
- Blackstairs Mountain

Highest point
- Elevation: 735 m (2,411 ft)
- Listing: Marilyn
- Coordinates: 52.549706°N 6.806197°W

Naming
- Language of name: Irish

Geography
- Location within island of Ireland
- Location: County Carlow, County Wexford, Ireland
- Parent range: Blackstairs Mountains
- OSI/OSNI grid: S810448
- Topo map: OSi Discovery 68

Blackstairs Mountain (Irish: An Staighre Dubh) is the second-highest mountain in the Blackstairs Mountains of southern Leinster in the Republic of Ireland. The mountain stretches from Rathgeran to Gowlin at Cathaoirs Den. The mountain is an assembly site for the feast of Lughnasa, known here as mountain Sunday.

== See also ==
- List of mountains in Ireland
