= Killurin, County Wexford =

Village in County Wexford, Ireland

Killurin Cill Liúráin
- Village
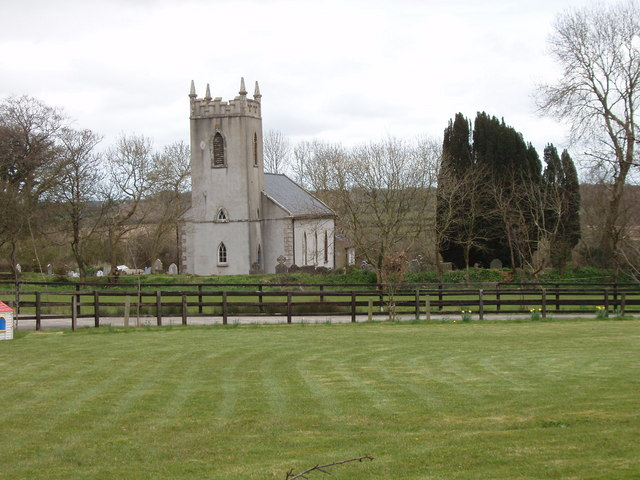
- Killurin Church

- Location in Ireland
- Coordinates: 52°23′N 6°34′W
- Country: Ireland
- Province: Leinster
- County: County Wexford

Population (2016)
  - Total: 166

Killurin (Irish: Cill Liúráin) is a village in County Wexford, Ireland on the R730 regional road. Sited along the banks of the River Slaney, it is approximately 10 kilometres north-west of Wexford town. The village is in a townland and civil parish of the same name.

== History ==
=== Castle ===
A Norman castle was built at the Deeps (Crossabeg) on the edge of the River Slaney in the 14th or 15th century. This castle, called the Deeps Castle, although now in ruins, is notable as one of the few remaining examples of a tower house of its kind. Forty years after Oliver Cromwell's invasion of Wexford, William of Orange fought and defeated the troops of his brother-in law, James II at the Battle of the Boyne in 1690. Afterwards James is said to have stayed in hiding at the Deeps Castle. The castle itself has since fallen into disrepair. The main chimney in the south wall collapsed into the building, weakening the entire structure and altering the distinctive skyline of the area.

The Deeps Castle is not actually located in Killurin, but in the parish of Crossabeg, adjacent to the parish boundary offered by the River Slaney. The nearby County Landfill is usually called the Killurin Landfill, in order to avoid confusion, as it is located closer to Killurin than it is to Crossabeg village itself.

=== Archaeology ===
In the 1950s, an ancient urn and other artifacts were discovered in a sandpit which spanned the Laffan-Freeman farm. The urn is now preserved in the National Museum. The sandpit, in which these finds were made, was the source of the sand which built many of County Wexford's schools in the 1940s and 1950s.

=== Railway ===
The Dublin-Wexford-Rosslare railway line runs through Killurin along the west bank of the River Slaney. During the years of the Irish War of Independence and Irish Civil War in the 1920s, the railway was frequently the target of the local IRA unit, the Kyle Flying Column. Several trains were derailed and rolling stock was destroyed during attempts to disrupt the communication between Dublin and Wexford.

== Transport ==
Bus Éireann route 382 serves Killurin on Fridays, linking it to Wexford town.

== See also ==
- List of towns and villages in Ireland
