= Mount Leinster =

Mountain in Carlow/Wexford, Ireland

- Stua Laighean
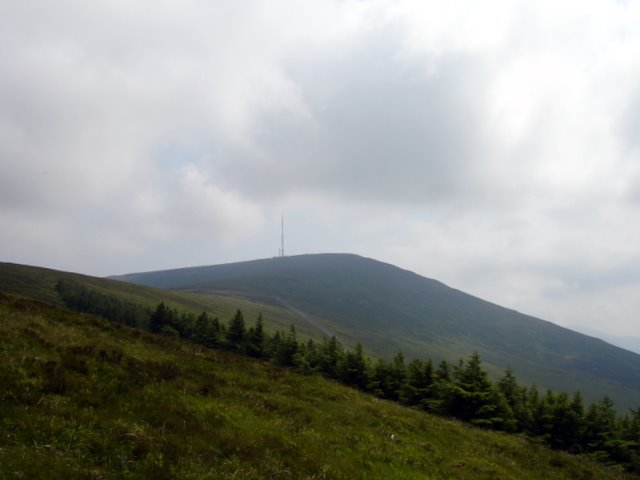
- Mount Leinster with its transmission mast

Highest point
- Elevation: 794.4 m (2,606 ft)
- Prominence: 706.42 m (2,317.7 ft)
- Listing: County Top (Carlow and Wexford), P600, Marilyn, Hewitt

Geography
- Location within island of Ireland
- Location: Counties Wexford and Carlow, Ireland
- Parent range: Blackstairs Mountains
- OSI/OSNI grid: S826525

Geology
- Mountain type: Granite

Mount Leinster (Irish: Stua Laighean, pronounced [sˠt̪ˠuə ˈl̪ˠəinˠ]) is a 794-metre-high (2,605 ft) mountain in the Republic of Ireland. It straddles the border between Counties Carlow and Wexford, in the province of Leinster. It is the fifth-highest mountain in Leinster after Lugnaquilla 925 metres (3,035 ft), Mullaghcleevaun 849 metres (2,785 ft), Tonelagee 817 metres (2,680 ft), and Cloghernagh 800 metres (2,600 ft), and the highest of the Blackstairs Mountains. A 2RN transmission site tops the peak with a mast height of 122 metres (400 ft).

== Summit access ==
The mountain is most often climbed from the Nine Stones, a landmark point at the foot of Mount Leinster, about 8 miles east of Borris. From Borris there is a road to a visitor car park on the mountain. From there the steep 2RN access road leads to the summit. This road is closed to normal traffic and 2RN have now fenced off the transmitter mast from public access to prevent vandalism.

The Nine Stones and the car park lie on the saddle between Mount Leinster and the nearby Slievebawn (Sliabh Bán; 52°38′18.6″N 6°48′33.32″W; 520 metres (1,710 ft)). There are in fact ten stones. They are arranged in a line and the largest is about 50 centimetres (20 in) high. The origin of the stones is uncertain.

== Other sports ==
=== Cycling ===
Mount Leinster has been used in stages of the Tour of Ireland and on many occasions in the FBD Insurance Rás (Rás Tailteann). It may be climbed from the Borris side in County Carlow or the Bunclody side in County Wexford. Ascending from Borris the climb is 11 kilometres (7 miles) long and has an average gradient of 6.9%. The last 2 kilometres (2,200 yd) are very tough reaching a gradient of almost 16%. Although the climb from Bunclody is slightly longer at 13 kilometres (8 miles) its average gradient is 5.9%. The last 1 kilometre (1,100 yd) of this climb is difficult with a gradient of 16.3%. The mountain is also used by The ML Syndicate (mountain biking club) who use the area for trail riding and MTB sporting events .

=== Hang gliding ===
The transmission site is a popular launch location for hang gliding and for radio-controlled gliders. In 2003, a hang glider pilot died from injuries sustained in the crash landing of his flight launched from the mountain. There is a memorial at the peak of the mountain.

== Plane Crash ==
On Wednesday 7 September 1983 a Cessna 182Q Skylane light aircraft crashed 30 metres (100 ft) below the summit while on a flight from Birmingham to Kilkenny. The four people aboard all died.

== Transmission site ==
The Mount Leinster transmitter is owned and operated by 2RN and at 796 metres (2,612 ft) ASL. It is the highest transmission site in Ireland, and was one of the original five main Telefís Éireann television transmitters when it opened on low power in December 1962. It became fully operational on 12 June 1963 with a 625-line service on VHF Band III Channel F. The RTÉ Radio FM service was added in 1966, and RTÉ's second television channel RTÉ 2 was carried on VHF when it started in 1978. UHF television transmissions from Mount Leinster began in 1996 with the introduction of Teilifís na Gaeilge, now known as TG4. The original 1962 mast was replaced in 2010 with a taller one of 122 metres (400 ft) in preparation for digital television transmissions. In common with all the other 2RN sites, analogue television transmissions from Mount Leinster ceased on 24 October 2012. Today the site provides the Irish digital television service Saorview, and eight FM radio stations to a large area of South East Ireland.

== Current transmissions ==
=== Digital television ===
Frequency	UHF	kW	Multiplex	Pol
490 MHz	23	160	Saorview 1	H
514 MHz	26	160	Saorview 2	H

=== FM radio ===
Frequency	kW	Service	Notes
89.6 MHz	200	RTÉ Radio 1	Since 1985
91.8 MHz	200	RTÉ 2fm	94.9 MHz Before 1985
99.2 MHz	200	RTÉ lyric fm	Since 1999
94.0 MHz	200	RTÉ Raidió na Gaeltachta	90.4 MHz Before 1985
101.4 MHz	200	Today FM	Since 1997
102.0 MHz	4	Beat 102 103	Since 2003
107.2 MHz	20	Newstalk	Since 2006
95.6 MHz	4	South East Radio	Initially 99.2MHz (1989-1994/5)

=== Mount Leinster relay transmitters ===
DTT Relay	County	Mux 1	Mux 2	kW	Pol
Arklow	Wicklow	21	24	0.25	V
Cahir	Tipperary	28	25	0.06	V
Clonmel	Tipperary	42	46	0.5	H
Forth Mountain	Wexford	33	36	0.5	V
Gallows Hill	Waterford	22	25	0.25	V
Gorey	Wexford	41	44	0.01	H
Kilmacthomas	Waterford	46	43	0.01	V
Suir Valley	Kilkenny	33	36	2	V

== See also ==
- Lists of mountains in Ireland
- List of Irish counties by highest point
- List of mountains of the British Isles by height
- List of P600 mountains in the British Isles
- List of Marilyns in the British Isles
- List of Hewitt mountains in England, Wales and Ireland
