= Borris House =

Coordinates: 52°35′54″N 6°55′36″W

- The Borris House

General information
- Type: Country House
- Architectural style: Tudor Revival
- Location: Borris, County Carlow, Ireland
- Completed: 1731
- Renovated: 1820
- Owner: McMorrough-Kavanagh family

Website
- https://borrishouse.ie/

Borris House is an Irish country house near Borris, County Carlow. It is the ancestral home of the McMorrough-Kavanagh family.

== History ==
Borris House was constructed in Tudor style in 1731 by Morgan Kavanagh of the MacMurrough Kavanagh dynasty. During the Irish Rebellion of 1798, the house was regularly attacked by Irish republican rebels. The first attack occurred on 24 May 1798 when 5,000 rebels attacked the house. It was defended by a Borris yeomanry unit commanded by Walter Kavanagh, which repelled the attack with 50 casualties. A further attack on 12 June was aimed at the houses of the yeomanry as well though this time the yeomanry were backed up by soldiers from the Prince of Wales's Own Donegal Militia. The rebels fired a howitzer at the house and caused damage to the walls but were unable to break them down and were obliged to retreat. It was restored in 1820 by the architects Richard and William Vitruvius Morrison.

During the Great Famine, Lady Harriet Kavanagh opened up Borris House as a lacemaking factory to provide employment for the women of Borris. She also regularly travelled across Europe, Egypt and the Near East collecting art and antiques as she painted watercolours that continue to hang in Borris House. Though most of the antiques were later handed over for display at the National Museum of Ireland. When Arthur MacMurrough Kavanagh inherited Borris House, despite being born without arms and legs, focussed on redeveloping the estate and village to benefit his tenants as well as constructing the Borris Railway Viaduct. In the 21st century, Borris House hosts an annual literary festival that is occasionally attended by the President of Ireland. It is still the private residence of the McMorrough Kavanaghs but it occasionally opens for tours.

== Notable births ==
- Arthur MacMurrough Kavanagh (1831–1889), politician

== Bibliography ==
- Joyce, Edmund. Borris House, Co. Carlow, and Elite Regency Patronage, Maynooth studies in local history, no. 108. Dublin, Four Courts Press, 2013 ISBN 978-1-84682-404-3 OCLC 827974018
- Murdoch, Tessa (ed.). Great Irish Households: Inventories from the Long Eighteenth Century. Cambridge: John Adamson, 22022 ISBN 978-1-898565-17-8 OCLC 1233305993, pp. 239–45

== See also ==
- List of country houses in County Carlow
