= Newbawn =

Village in County Wexford, Ireland

Newbawn Irish: An Bábhun Nua
- Village
- Location in Ireland
- Coordinates: 52°20′N 6°47′W
- Country: Ireland
- Province: Leinster
- County: Wexford

Population (2016)
  - Total: 177
- Time zone: UTC+0 (WET)
  - Summer (DST): UTC-1 (IST (WEST))
- Area code: 051

Newbawn (Irish: An Bábhun Nua, meaning 'the new enclosure') is a small village located in the southwest of County Wexford, Ireland. It is 11 km (7 mi) south-east of New Ross, and 20 km (12 mi) west of Wexford town, and is on the R735 regional road about 3 km (2 mi) south of the N25 national primary road. The village is in a townland and civil parish of the same name.

== Etymology ==
Newbawn in the Irish language is Bábhun Nua. Nua means 'new'. A bábhun is literally a walled enclosure. Often, this is applied to the wall that encloses the yard surrounding a castle, though this may or may not be the meaning here. It can also mean an enclosure for cows.

== History ==
There is a poorly preserved Portal tomb (sometimes called a Dolmen) located at Collopswell, near Newbawn, which dates from the Neolithic period.

The area was controlled by the Devereux family of Adamstown and Ballymagir for hundreds of years soon after the arrival of the Normans (1169). They acquired the area from the de Headon family in the late 13th century. Newbawn was part of the 'Manor of Colpe', which in 1669 was granted to Robert Leigh of Rosegarland.

After this time, and particularly throughout the 18th century, a family named Sweetman were very prominent in the Newbawn area.

== Amenities ==
Today, the village contains a shop and post office, a pub (Foleys Bar), a primary (national) school, a Roman Catholic church and an adjoining cemetery. The church was built in 1889. The local Gaelic Athletic Association club is Adamstown GAA Club. It also has a community centre.

== See also ==
- List of towns and villages in Ireland

== Sources ==
- Brooks, Eric St. John, Knights’ Fees in Counties Wexford, Carlow and Kilkenny (13th-15th century). Dublin: Stationery Office, 1950.
