= Arthurstown =

Village in County Wexford, Ireland

Arthurstown Colmán
- Village
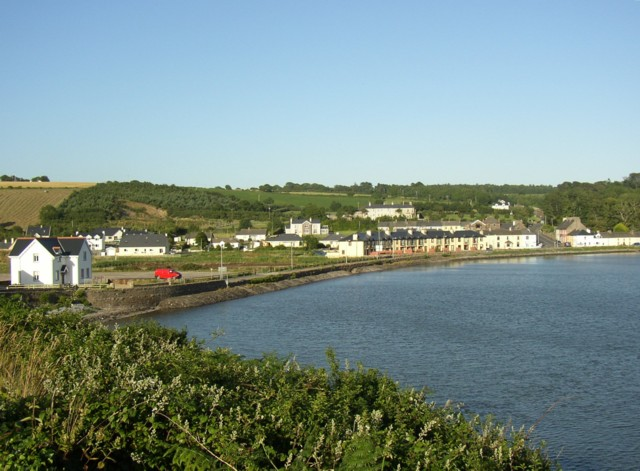
- King's Bay at Arthurstown

- Location in Ireland
- Coordinates: 52°14′32″N 6°57′06″W
- Country: Ireland
- Province: Leinster
- County: County Wexford

Population (2016)
  - Total: 127

Arthurstown (Irish: Colmán) is a small village in the townland of Coleman in southwest County Wexford, Ireland. It is located at the junction of the R733 and R770 regional roads on the eastern shore of the Waterford Harbour estuary, where The Three Sisters flow into the sea. As of the 2016 census, the town had a population of 127.

Located between Ballyhack and Duncannon, Arthurstown is home to a pub and service station.

== See also ==
- List of towns and villages in the Republic of Ireland
- Marquess of Donegall
