= Borris, County Carlow =

Borris An Bhuiríos
- Village
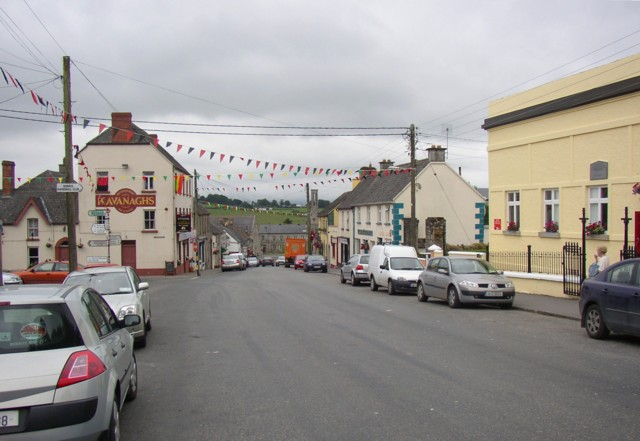
- Main Street

- Location in Ireland
- Coordinates: 52°36′08″N 6°55′30″W
- Continent: Ireland
- Province: Leinster
- County: County Carlow

Area
  - Total: 3.74 km^{2} (1.44 sq mi)
- Elevation: 53 m (174 ft)

Population (2022)
  - Total: 702
  - Density: 188/km^{2} (486/sq mi)
- Time zone: UTC+0 (WET)
  - Summer (DST): UTC-1 (IST (WEST))
- Irish Grid Reference: S733503

Borris (Irish: An Bhuiríos, formerly Buirgheas Ó nDróna) is a village on the River Barrow, in County Carlow, Ireland. It is 26 km south of Carlow town and 22 km east of Kilkenny city, and lies on the R702 regional road.

Borris has views of the neighbouring countryside with Mount Leinster and the Blackstairs Mountains to the east, and the Barrow Valley to the west. It is the home to Borris House, the ancestral home of the MacMurrough Kavanaghs.

== Amenities ==
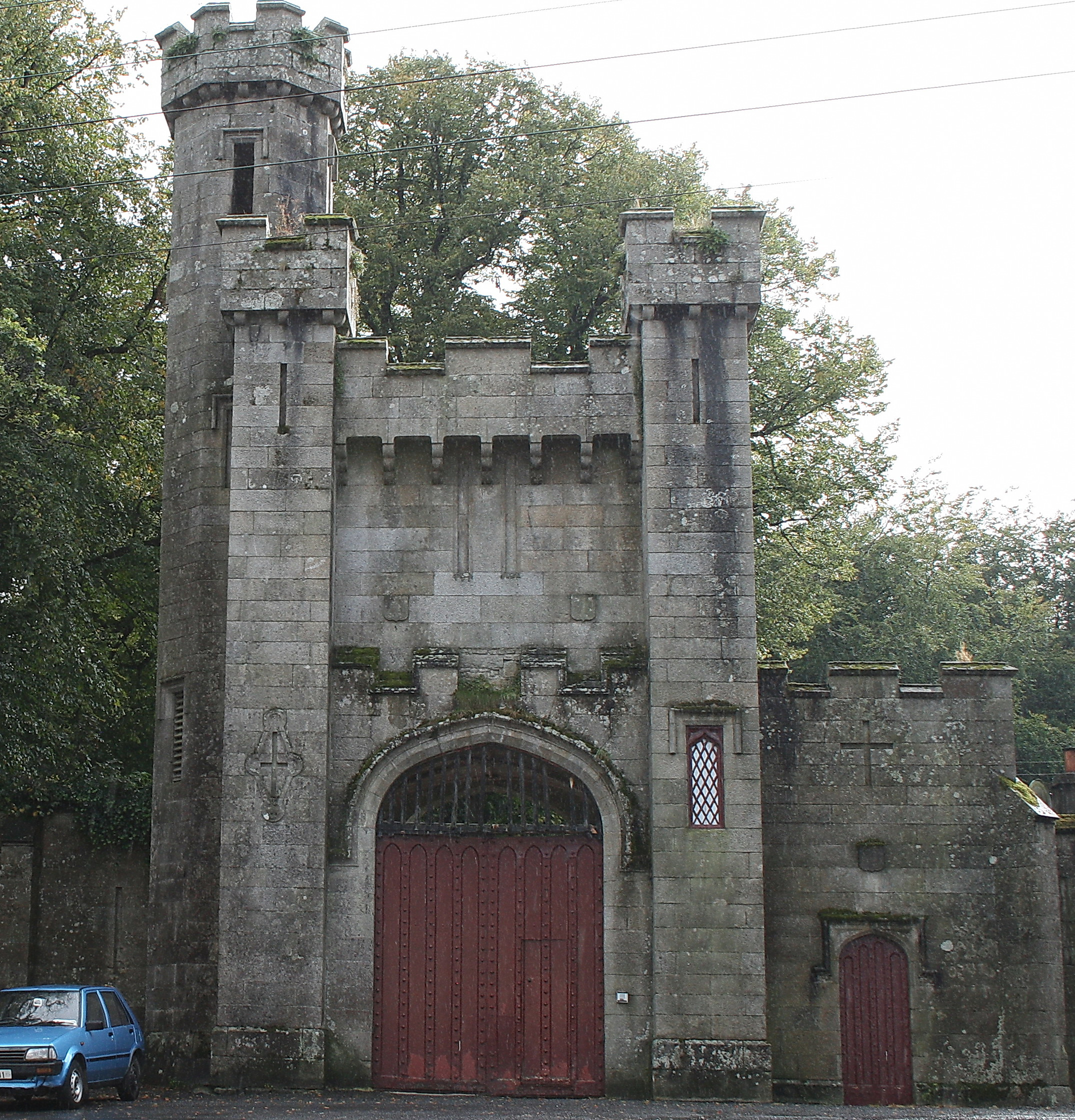
Main Gate to Borris House on Main Street

The village has one of the oldest golf courses in Ireland as well as a 16-arch limestone viaduct (the 16 Bridges) built in 1860 and designed by William Richard Le Fanu. It has a hotel, "The Step House", a mixed national school and mixed vocational school (colloquially known as "The Tech" or "BVS"), a Roman Catholic church, three public houses and other shops and stores.

The old school closed in 1980 and has been used by different community groups, including Scouting Ireland. It also houses CRISP (Carlow Rural Information Services Project) and a branch of the Carlow County Library.

Borris House caters for weddings and has hosted concerts (including by Mary Coughlan and Mundy). Borris House has also hosted the "Festival of Writing and Ideas" during the summer.

== History ==
The MacMurrough Kavanagh dynasty, former Irish Kings of Leinster, have been based in the town for some time. The family still live at Borris House in the town centre. Built in Tudor style, the house is open to groups by prior arrangement.

The village prospered in the late 1800s as Arthur MacMurrough Kavanagh, the landlord of the time, developed a sawmill and a lace-making industry. He also instigated the building of the 16-arch viaduct, situated at the lower end of the village, which was intended to carry the now defunct Great Southern and Western Railway line between Muine Bheag and Wexford. Borris railway station opened on 20 December 1858, closed for passenger traffic on 2 February 1931 and for goods traffic on 27 January 1947, finally closing altogether on 1 April 1963.

Housing developments in the area include Lodge Court, Woodlawn Park, Oak Tree Court, and Station Road.

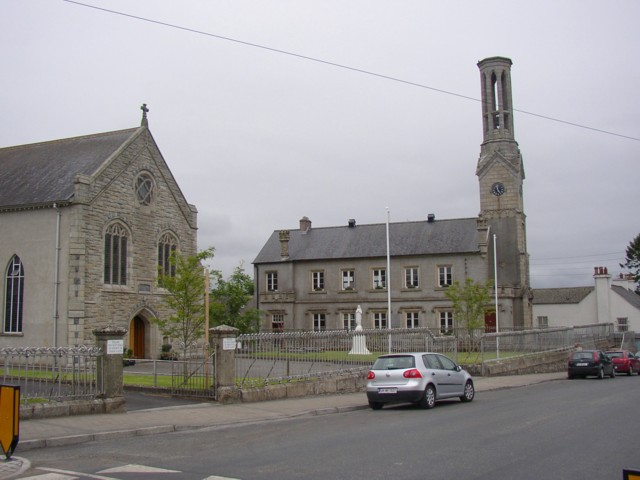
Borris Church

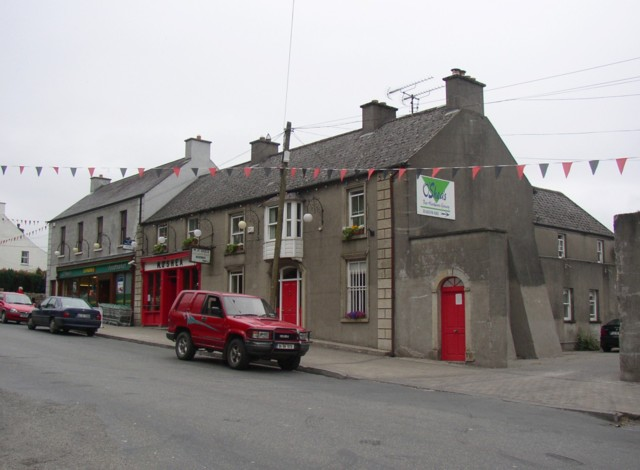
O'Sheas Shop and Bar on Main Street

== Sports and clubs ==
Borris is home to Mount Leinster Rangers GAA club, which was founded in 1988 with the amalgamation of 3 parish teams: Borris, Ballymurphy and Rathanna. In 2006, the club won its first Carlow Senior Hurling Championship, beating St Mullin's in the final. The club went on to win several additional senior championships, and won its 12th senior county hurling title in 2025. In 2012, the club won the All-Ireland Intermediate Club Hurling Championship title.

The local Scouting Ireland group, the 3rd Carlow Borris Scout group, was founded in 1983.

== Notable people ==
- Sarah Breen, author and journalist
- Pat Byrne, winner of the first series of The Voice of Ireland
- Olivia O'Leary, journalist, writer and current affairs presenter

== See also ==
- List of towns and villages in the Republic of Ireland
