= Ballywilliam =

Village in County Wexford, Ireland

Ballywilliam Baile Liam
- Village
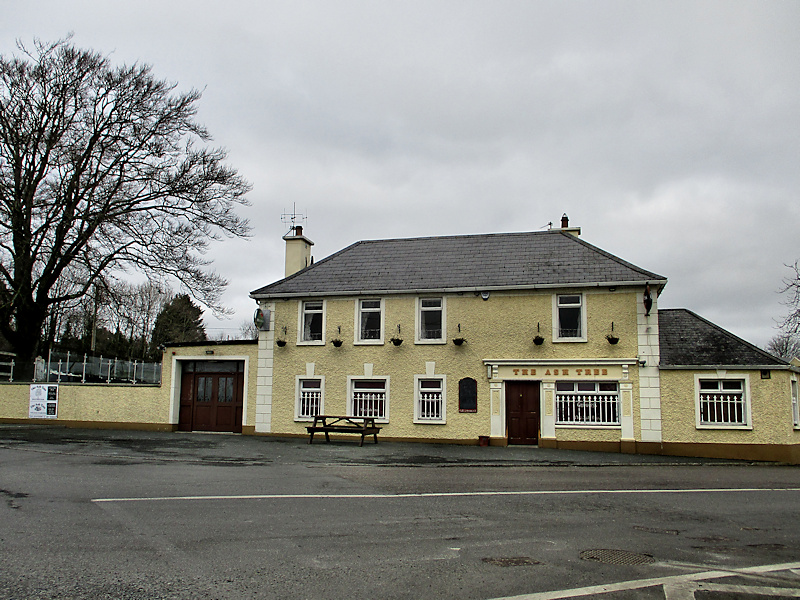
- Pub in Ballywilliam

- Location in Ireland
- Coordinates: 52°26′55″N 6°51′54″W
- Country: Ireland
- Province: Leinster
- County: Wexford
- Elevation: 88 m (289 ft)
- Time zone: UTC+0 (WET)
  - Summer (DST): UTC-1 (IST (WEST))
- Area code: 051

Ballywilliam (historically also Ballyliam, from Irish: Baile Liam, meaning 'Liam's settlement') is a village in the west of County Wexford, Ireland. The nearest town is New Ross, 8 kilometres (5 mi) to the south west. The village sits on the R731 road.

== History ==
The village once had its own railway station, which was closed in 1963. Ballywilliam Railway Station was the first railway station in County Wexford. It opened in 1862.

Ballywilliam R.I.C. Barracks was burned during the Irish War of Independence, on 5 April 1920.

== Amenities ==
Today, the village contains an agricultural cooperative, two pubs, and a Garda Station. Ballywilliam also contains a shop/petrol station.

== Sport ==
Ballywilliam is home to Shelburne United AFC, a local soccer club that competes in the Wexford and District League, the Wexford and District Schoolboys' League and Wexford and District Women's and Schoolgirls' League.

== See also ==
- List of towns and villages in Ireland
