= Kiltealy =

Village in County Wexford, Ireland

Kiltealy Cill Téile
- Village
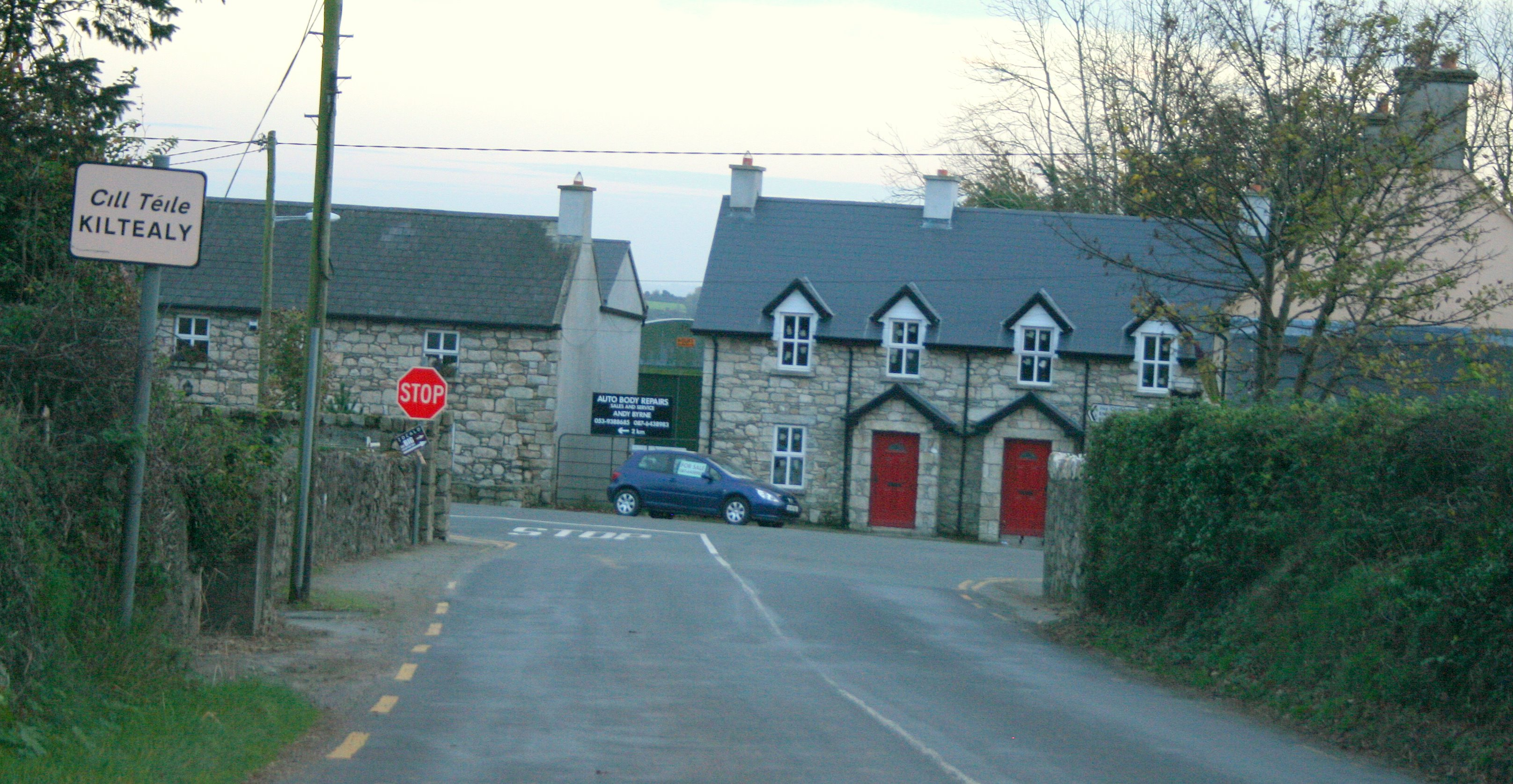

- Location in Ireland
- Coordinates: 52.56502°N 6.74637°W
- Country: Ireland
- Province: Leinster
- County: County Wexford

Kiltealy (Irish: Cill Téile) is a small village in the southeastern corner of Ireland. It is situated on the foothills of the Blackstairs Mountains in County Wexford at the junction of the R702 and R730 regional roads, on the eastern flank of the Blackstairs Mountains. The previous spelling was Cill Teidhile which means the Chapel/cemetery of Teidhil. Teidhil would most likely be the a first name although no longer in use as such.

== Demographics ==
In 2002, the Kiltealy electoral area had a population of 409.

== People ==
- Anthony Kearns, member of the Irish Tenors, born Kiltealy
- Mogue Kearns, priest and executed rebel leader in the 1798 rebellion, born Kiltealy

== See also ==
- List of towns and villages in Ireland
