= Blackstairs Mountains =

Mountain range in Ireland

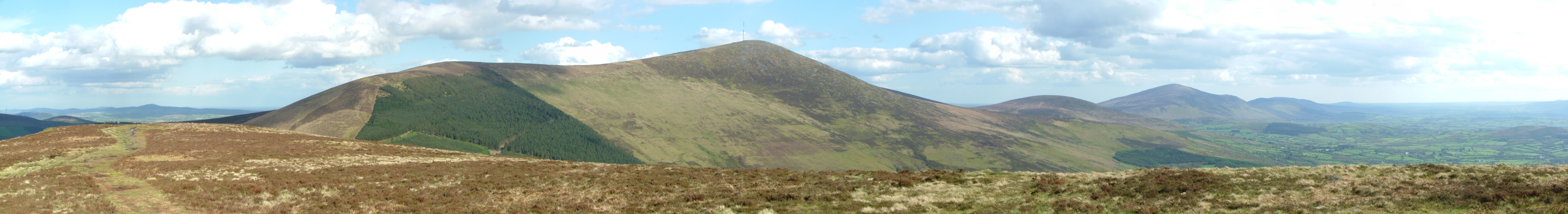
- Panorama of the Blackstairs Mountains

Highest point
- Peak: Mount Leinster, East of Borris
- Elevation: 796 m (2,612 ft)
- Listing: Mountains of Ireland
- Coordinates: 52°37′1.2″N 6°46′40.8″W

Naming
- Native name: Na Staighrí Dubha (Irish)

Geography
- Country: Ireland
- Province: Leinster
- Counties: Carlow and Wexford
- Towns: Bunclody, Borris, Ballymurphy, Kiltealy, Rathnure, Ballywilliam, St Mullin's and Graiguenamanagh
- Range coordinates: 52°35′17″N 6°46′48″W

The Blackstairs Mountains (Irish: Na Staighrí Dubha) run roughly north/south along the border between County Carlow and County Wexford in Ireland. The highest peak is Mount Leinster with a total height of 793 m (2,602 ft). Blackstairs Mountain is the second highest peak at 732 m (2,402 ft).

Highest Hills	Height (m)	Location
Mount Leinster	793	52.617°N 6.778°W
Blackstairs Mountain	732	
Black Rock Mountain	599	52.6174°N 6.7281°W
Knockroe	540	52.5924°N 6.7919°W
Slievebawn	520	52.6389°N 6.8096°W
Carrigroe	495	52.5197°N 6.8324°W
Carrigalachan	463	52.5305°N 6.8370°W
Croaghaun	455	52.6637°N 6.7676°W
Slievebaun	444	52.5328°N 6.8005°W
