= R730 road (Ireland) =

Road in Ireland

R730 road
- Bóthar R730
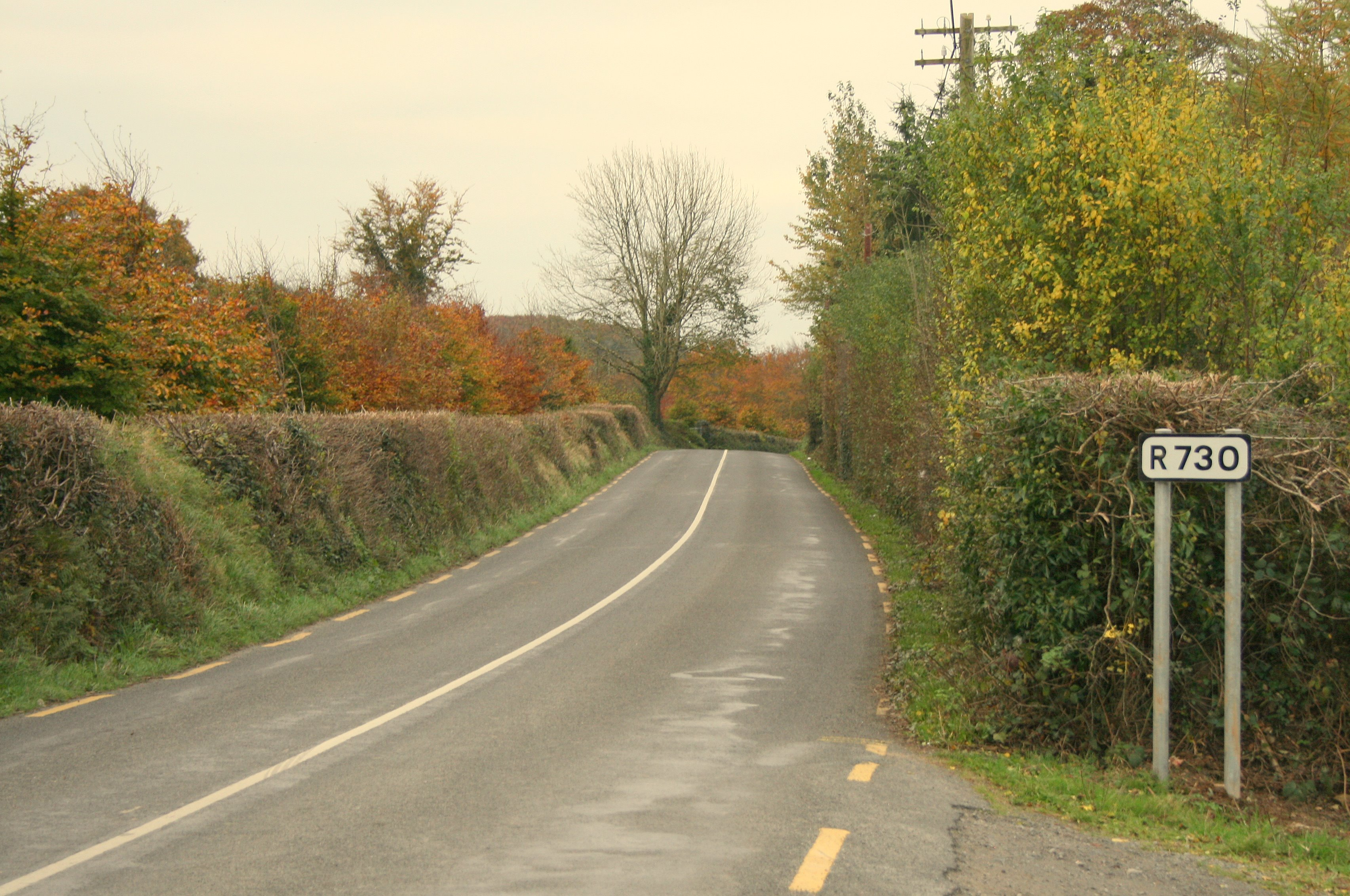
- R730 near Rathfylane

Route information
- Length: 35 km (22 mi)

Location
- Country: Ireland
- Primary destinations: County Wexford; Kiltealy – Leave the R702; R731; Rathfylane; Joins/leaves the N30; Killurin; Crosses the Dublin-Rosslare Europort railway line; (N11); Wexford Town; Blackhorse terminates at the N25.

Highway system
- Roads in Ireland; Motorways; Primary; Secondary; Regional

The R730 road is a regional road in County Wexford, Ireland. From its junction with the R702 in Kiltealy it takes a southeasterly route to its junction with the R741 in the centre of Wexford Town, continuing south to Blackhorse to its junction on a roundabout with the N25 Wexford bypass. En route it crosses the N30 national primary road. The road is 35 km (22 mi) long.

The road has subsumed short sections of the N11 and N25 which formerly passed through Wexford Town, prior to the opening of the Wexford bypass. This section of the road also formed part of the former Trunk Road, T8.

== See also ==
- Roads in Ireland
- Motorways in the Republic of Ireland
- National primary road
- National secondary road
- Trunk roads in Ireland
- Road signs in Ireland
