= Adamstown, County Wexford =

Village in County Wexford, Ireland

Adamstown Maigh Arnaí
- Village
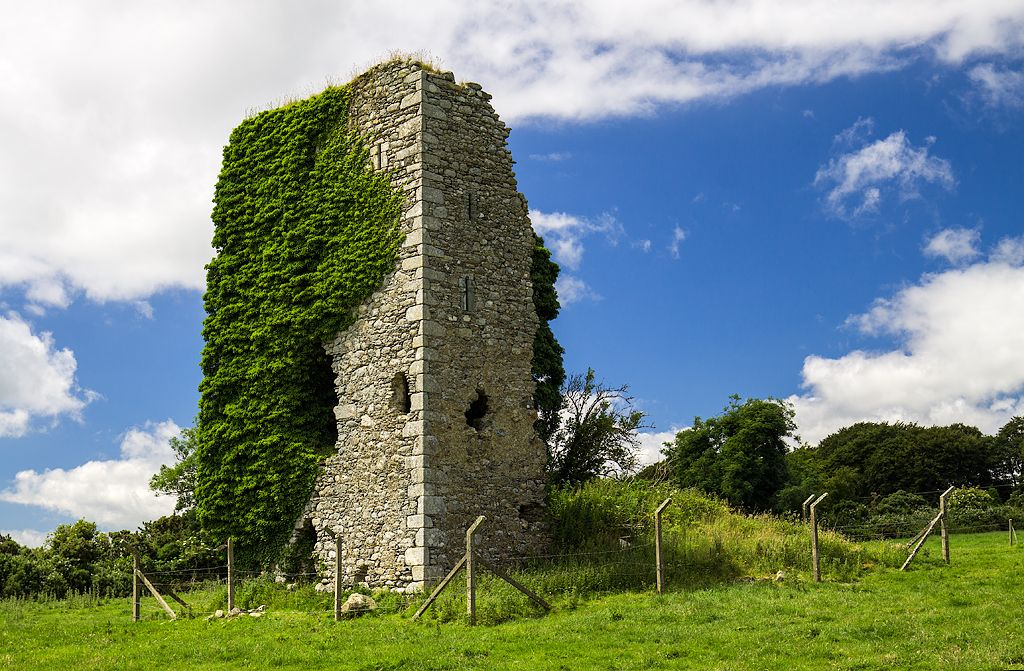
- Ruined tower house near Adamstown

- Location in Ireland
- Coordinates: 52°23′38″N 6°43′01″W
- Country: Ireland
- Province: Leinster
- County: County Wexford
- Elevation: 48 m (157 ft)

Population (2016)
  - Total: 293
- Time zone: UTC+0 (WET)
  - Summer (DST): UTC-1 (IST (WEST))
- Irish Grid Reference: S872275

Adamstown (Irish: Maigh Arnaighe or Maigh Arnaí, meaning 'the plain of the berries') is a village in County Wexford, Ireland. It is about 24 km (15 mi) north-west of Wexford, 20 km (12 mi) east of New Ross, and 20 km (12 mi) south-west of Enniscorthy. The village is in a townland and civil parish of the same name.

== History ==
A monastery called Magheranoidhe was built in the area c. 600 AD by a Saint Abban different from Abbán moccu Corbmaic.

Following the Norman conquest of Ireland, the monastery became property of the Marshall family. The de Heddon and later Devereux families were granted control of it and the surrounding lands.

A castle was built in the area by Adam Devereux, for who the village is named, in 1418. This castle was rebuilt in 1556 by Nicholas Devereux. The Adamstown estate later passed to the Earl of Albemarle, and later the Downes family by the 1800s.

A church dedicated to St. Abban was built in Adamstown in 1835.

== Amenities ==
The village contains a primary school, a secondary school, a GAA pitch and soccer pitch, a community centre, two pubs, a shop, an R.C. church and an adjoining cemetery, chemist, Almost adjacent to the village is Adamstown castle (or tower house), which dates from the 16th century.

The Adamstown Agricultural Show is held there on the first Saturday of July every year.

== Transport ==
Bus Éireann routes 371 and 382 serve the village on Fridays providing links to Wexford and New Ross.

== Notable people ==
- Pádraic Delaney, actor
- Kevin Doyle, football player
