= Ballaghkeen North =

Barony in County Wexford, Ireland

Ballaghkeen North An Bealach Caoin Thuaidh (Irish)
- Barony
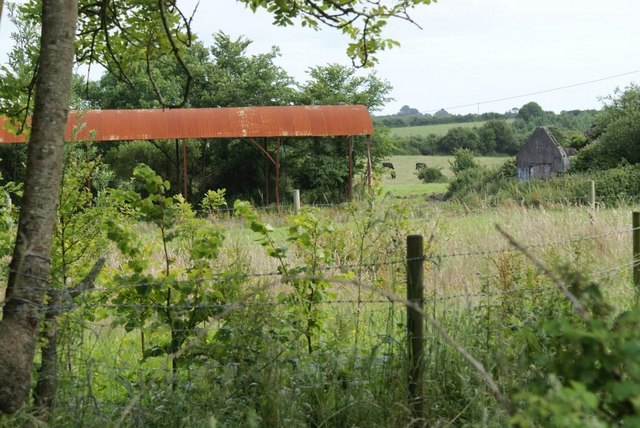
- Derelict barns north of Clonevan

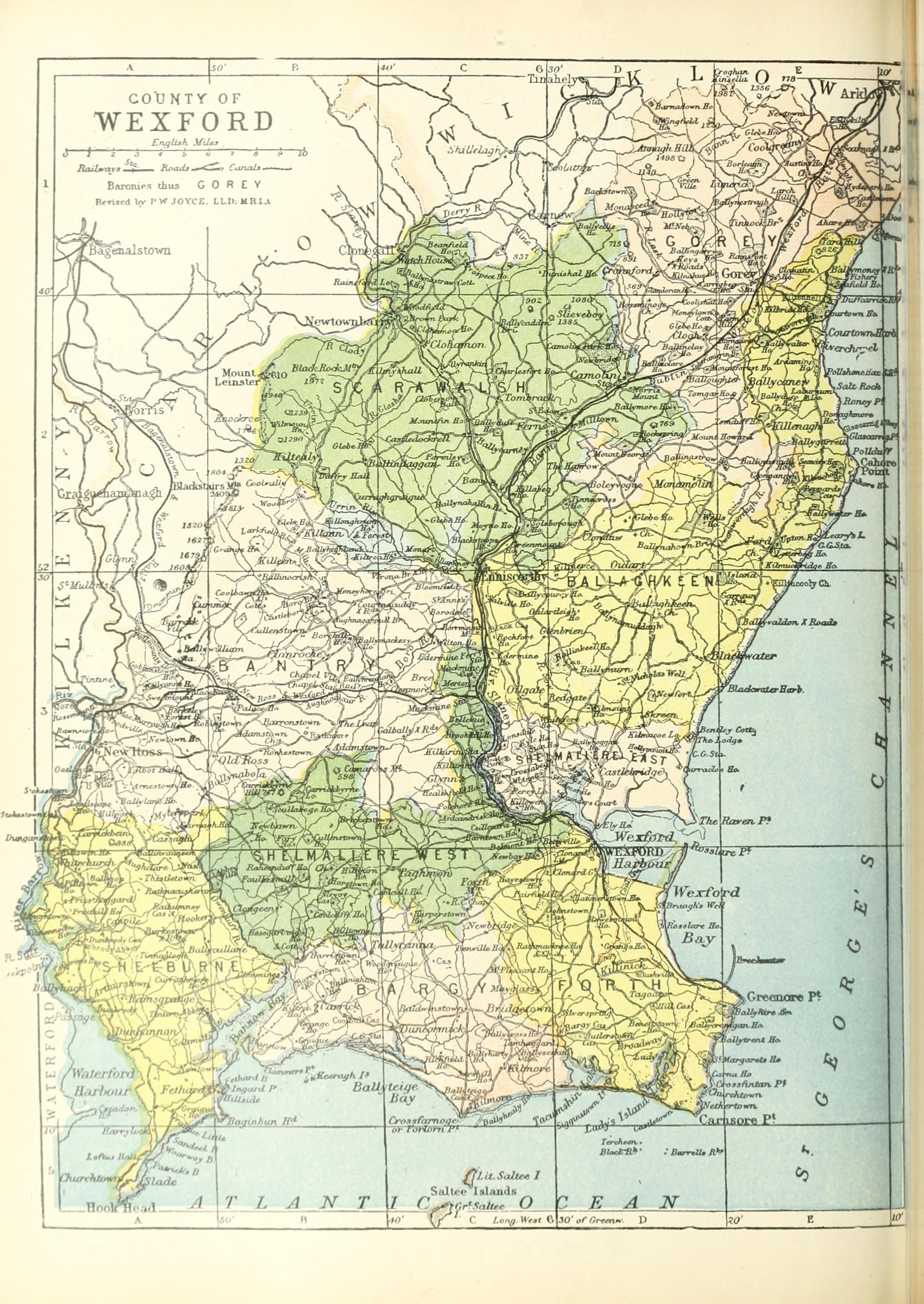
- Barony map of County Wexford, 1900; Ballaghkeen North barony is in the east, coloured yellow.

- Location within Ireland
- Coordinates: 52°38′N 6°16′W
- Sovereign state: Ireland
- Province: Leinster
- County: Wexford

Area
  - Total: 183.8 km^{2} (71.0 sq mi)

Ballaghkeen North (Irish: An Bealach Caoin Thuaidh) is a historical barony in eastern County Wexford, Ireland.

Baronies were mainly cadastral rather than administrative units. They acquired modest local taxation and spending functions in the 19th century before being superseded by the Local Government (Ireland) Act 1898.

== History ==
The barony takes its name from Ballaghkeen (The Ballagh), a village in Ballaghkeen South. The McMurphys of Uí Felmeda Thes ("Southern Descendants of Felmed") are noted very early here. The Síol Mella sept of the Ui Cheinnselaig, as well as the Cenel Cobthaig, were also there.

The single barony of Ballaghkeen was created in 1606; it was divided into north and south some time before 1868.

== Geography ==
Ballaghkeen North is in the northeastern coastal part of the county.

== List of settlements ==
Settlements within the historical barony of Ballaghkeen North include:

- Blackwater
- Courtown
- Gorey
- Kilmuckridge
- Monamolin
- Oulart
- Riverchapel
