= R744 road (Ireland) =

Road in Ireland

R744 road
- Bóthar R744
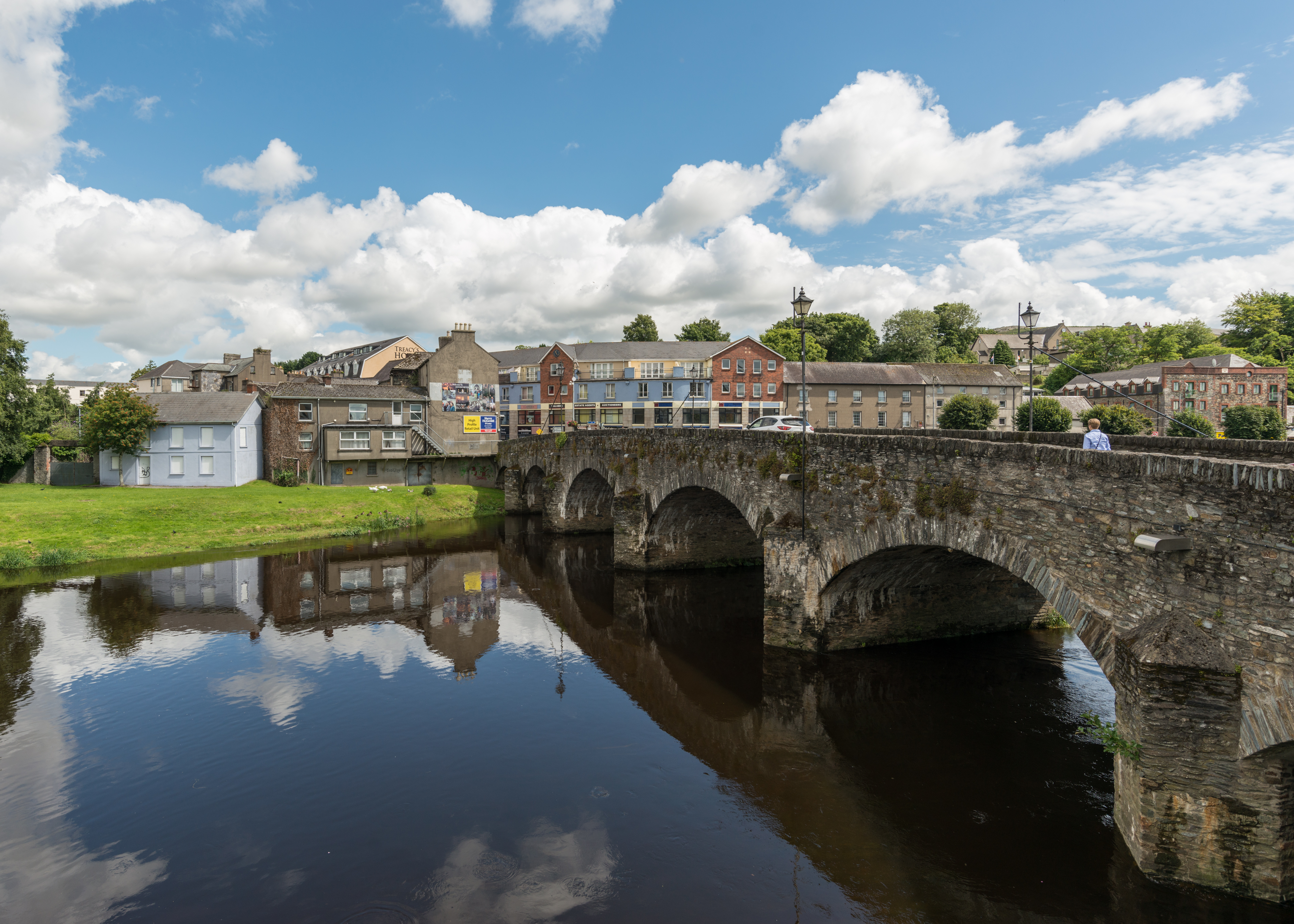
- Enniscorthy Bridge, formerly N11, now R744/R772

Route information
- Length: 23.6 km (14.7 mi)

Major junctions
- From: N30 at Templescoby, County Wexford
- R890 at St. John's Road, Enniscorthy; R702 at Abbey Square, Enniscorthy; R772 at Abbey Quay, Enniscorthy; R728 at Tomnafunshoge; R741 at Askabeg

- To: R742 at Blackwater

Location
- Country: Ireland

Highway system
- Roads in Ireland; Motorways; Primary; Secondary; Regional
| ← R743 | → R745 |

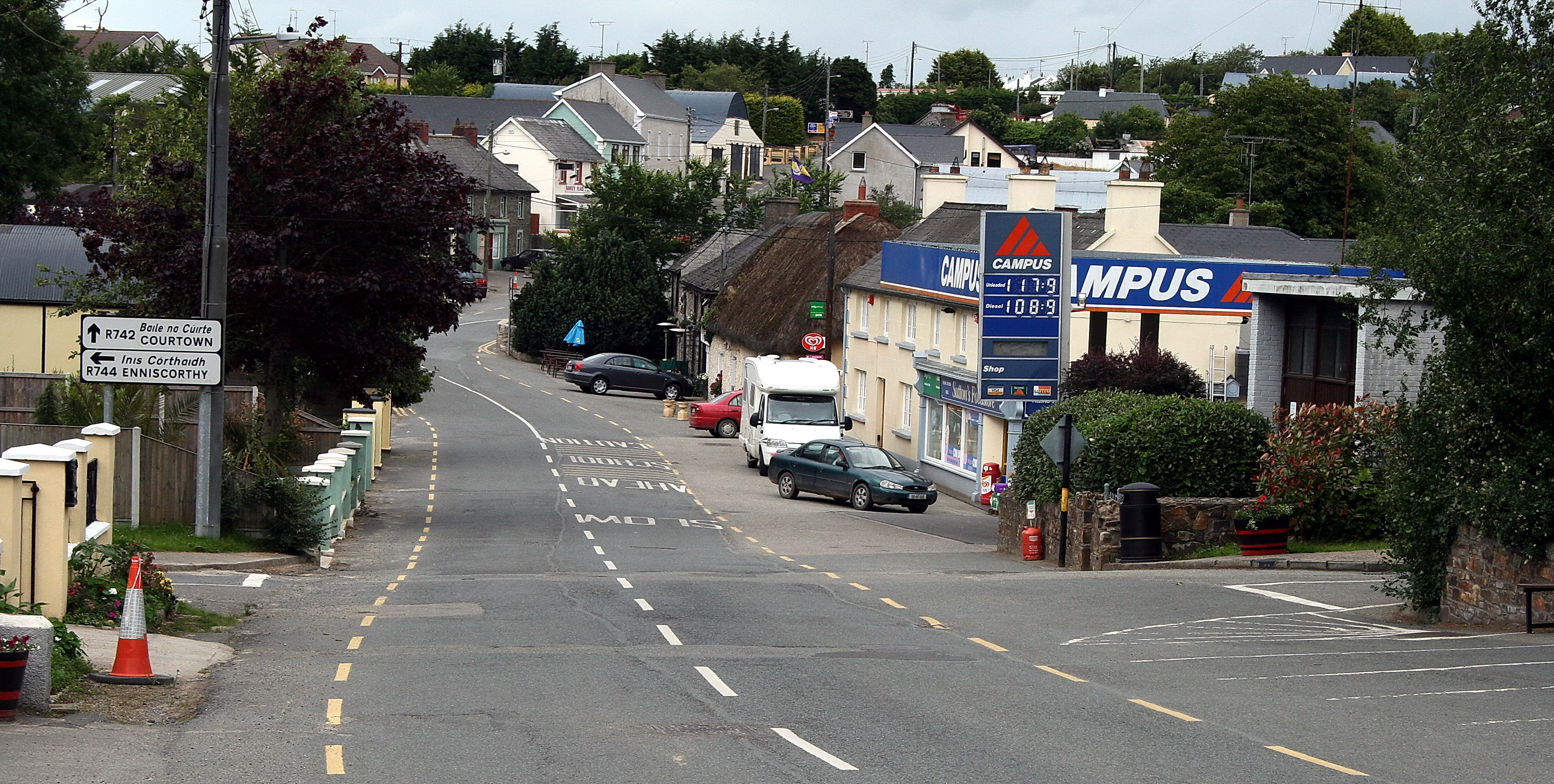
At turn for R744 in Blackwater

The R744 road is a regional road in County Wexford, Ireland. It travels from the N30 road west of Enniscorthy, via Enniscorthy to Blackwater. The road is 23.6 km (14.7 mi) long.
