= Raheenduff =

Townland in County Wexford, Ireland

Coordinates: 52°31′29″N 6°22′55″W

Raheenduff (Irish: An Ráithín Dubh) is a townland in County Wexford, Ireland. It is 13 km south-west of Enniscorthy, between Oulart, Ballyedmond and Boolavogue. Raheenduff is in the civil parish of Kilcormick, in the barony of Ballaghkeen North and is 160.73 hectares (397.2 acres) in area.

In the 1901 census 31 inhabitants are recorded and in 1911 this has increased to 39. As of the 2011 census, Raheenduff townland had a population of 67 people.
