= Ballaghkeen South =

Barony in County Wexford, Ireland

Ballaghkeen South An Bealach Caoin Theas (Irish)
- Barony
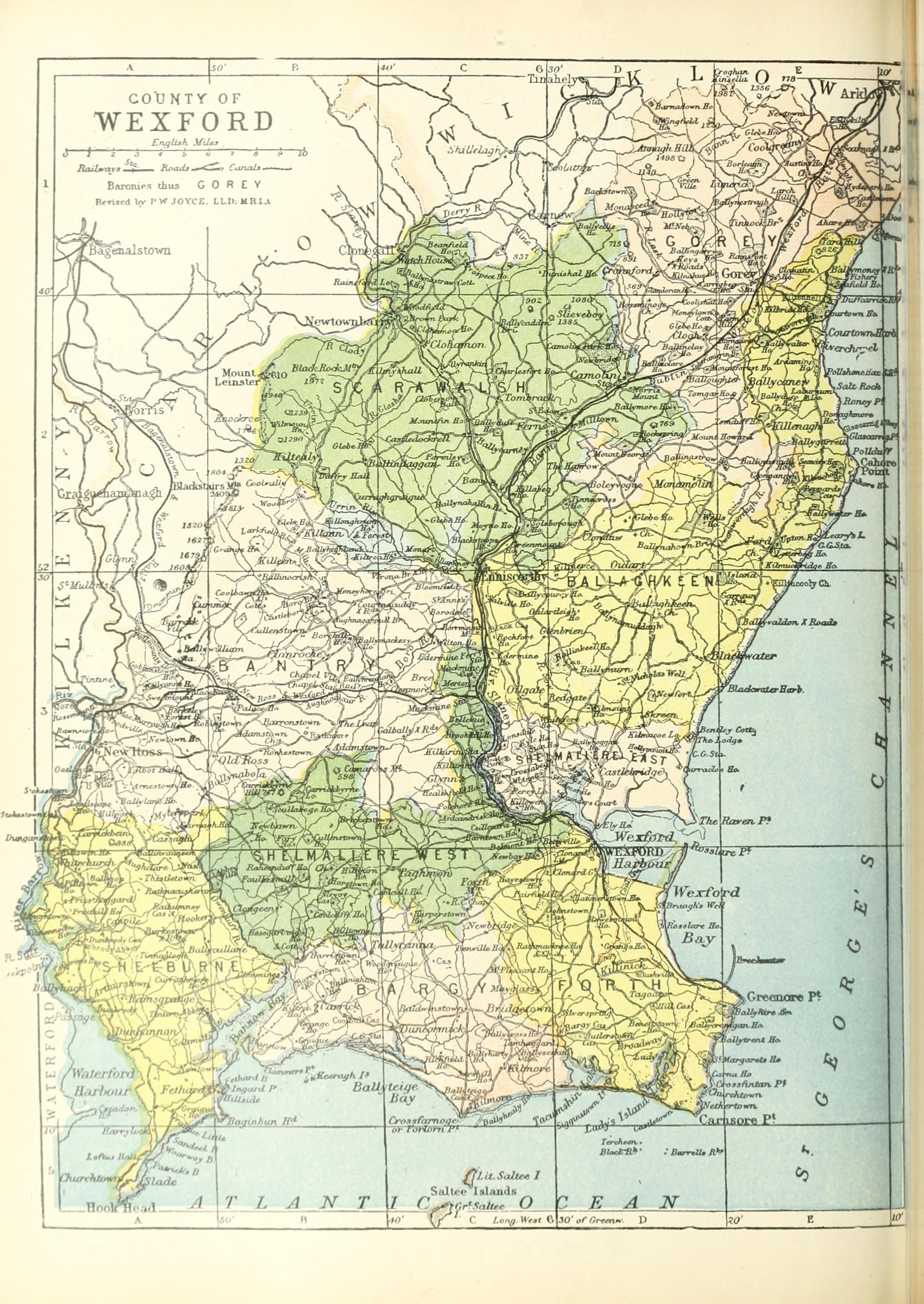
- Barony map of County Wexford, 1900; Ballaghkeen barony is in the east, coloured yellow and not divided into north and south.

- Location within Ireland
- Coordinates: 52°29′N 6°25′W
- Sovereign state: Ireland
- Province: Leinster
- County: Wexford

Area
  - Total: 203.6 km^{2} (78.6 sq mi)

Ballaghkeen South (Irish: An Bealach Caoin Theas) is a historical barony in southwest County Wexford, Ireland.

Baronies were mainly cadastral rather than administrative units. They acquired modest local taxation and spending functions in the 19th century before being superseded by the Local Government (Ireland) Act 1898.

== History ==
The barony takes its name from Ballaghkeen (The Ballagh), a village in County Wexford. The McMurphys of Uí Felmeda Thes ("Southern Descendants of Felmed") are noted very early here.

The single barony of Ballaghkeen was created in 1606; it was divided into north and south some time before 1868.

== Geography ==
Ballaghkeen South is in the eastern coastal part of the county, east of the River Slaney and north of Shelmalier.

== List of settlements ==
Settlements within the historical barony of Ballaghkeen South include:

- Ballaghkeen
- Ballymurn
- Blackwater
