= Riverchapel =

Village in County Wexford, Ireland

Riverchapel Séipéal na hAbhann
- Village
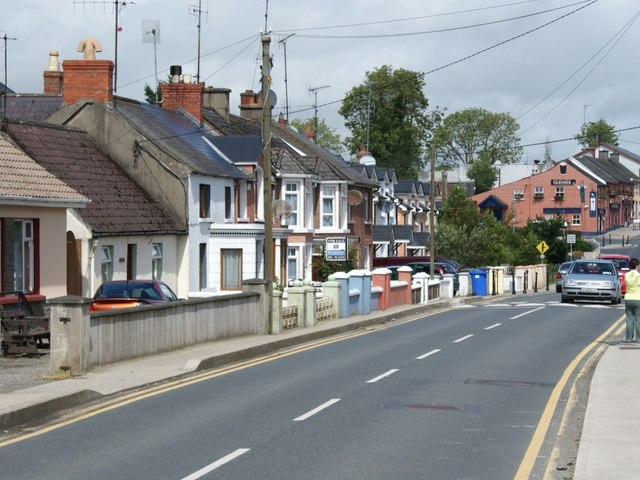
- Main Street, Riverchapel

- Location in Ireland
- Coordinates: 52°38′12″N 6°14′02″W
- Country: Ireland
- Province: Leinster
- County: County Wexford

Area
  - Total: 1.23 km^{2} (0.47 sq mi)

Population (2016 National Census)
  - Total: 3,665 (inc. Ardamine). Combined population with Courtown = 6,287.
  - Density: 2,980/km^{2} (7,720/sq mi)
- Time zone: UTC+0 (WET)
  - Summer (DST): UTC-1 (IST (WEST))

Riverchapel (Irish: Séipéal na hAbhann) is a village in County Wexford, Ireland. It lies just south of Courtown on the R742 regional road and has been a summer holiday resort for Dublin people at least since tourists started to arrive in 1863 when the railway line from Dublin reached nearby Gorey. The population of the area has also grown significantly since the mid-2000s. Riverchapel is 1 km inland from the Irish Sea coast and has merged into the adjoining village of Courtown.

Both villages have many caravan parks and holiday homes. In the late 20th and early 21st century, significant urbanisation has taken place, especially in Riverchapel, with major expansions being done to local shops and the additions of new amenities such as a pharmacy and community sports complex for association football and GAA, although the local Gaelic football and hurling club Réalt na Mara is based in neighbouring Ballygarrett. Large housing estates are now home to commuters working in Dublin. Ardamine is to its left and Gorey is the nearest industrial town. The population for the Riverchapel-Courtown area stands at 6,287 as of 2016, with these statistics including the surrounding housing areas of Ardamine and Poulshone.

== Transport ==
Two separate bus services run through Riverchapel. Transport for Ireland operate a commuter-oriented bus (Route 389) to Gorey that starts in Poulshone and runs in mornings and evenings 7 days a week. A local bus service also provides four more bus times 6 days a week, and goes as far as Ballygarrett, with no clashes between both buses. On Mondays and Saturdays Bus Éireann route 379 operates and continues to Wexford via Curracloe. Route 879 operates on Tuesdays, Thursdays and Fridays. On Wednesdays, the service is provided by the Rural Roadrunner bus operated by Wexford Local Development.

The nearest station is Gorey railway station, around 8 kilometres away.

== See also ==
- List of towns and villages in Ireland
