= Clonevan =

Church in County Wexford, Ireland

Coordinates: 52°33′N 6°14′W

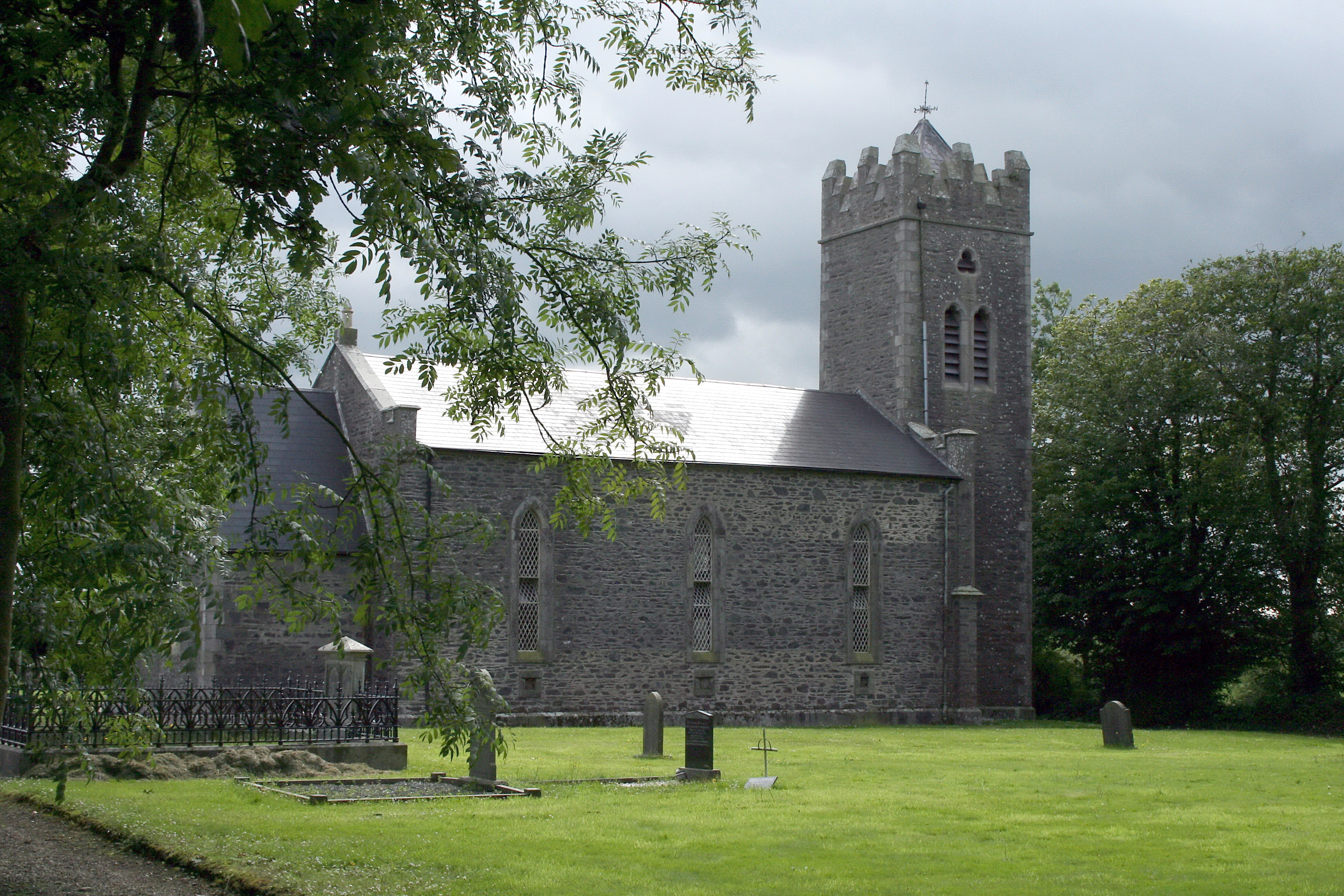

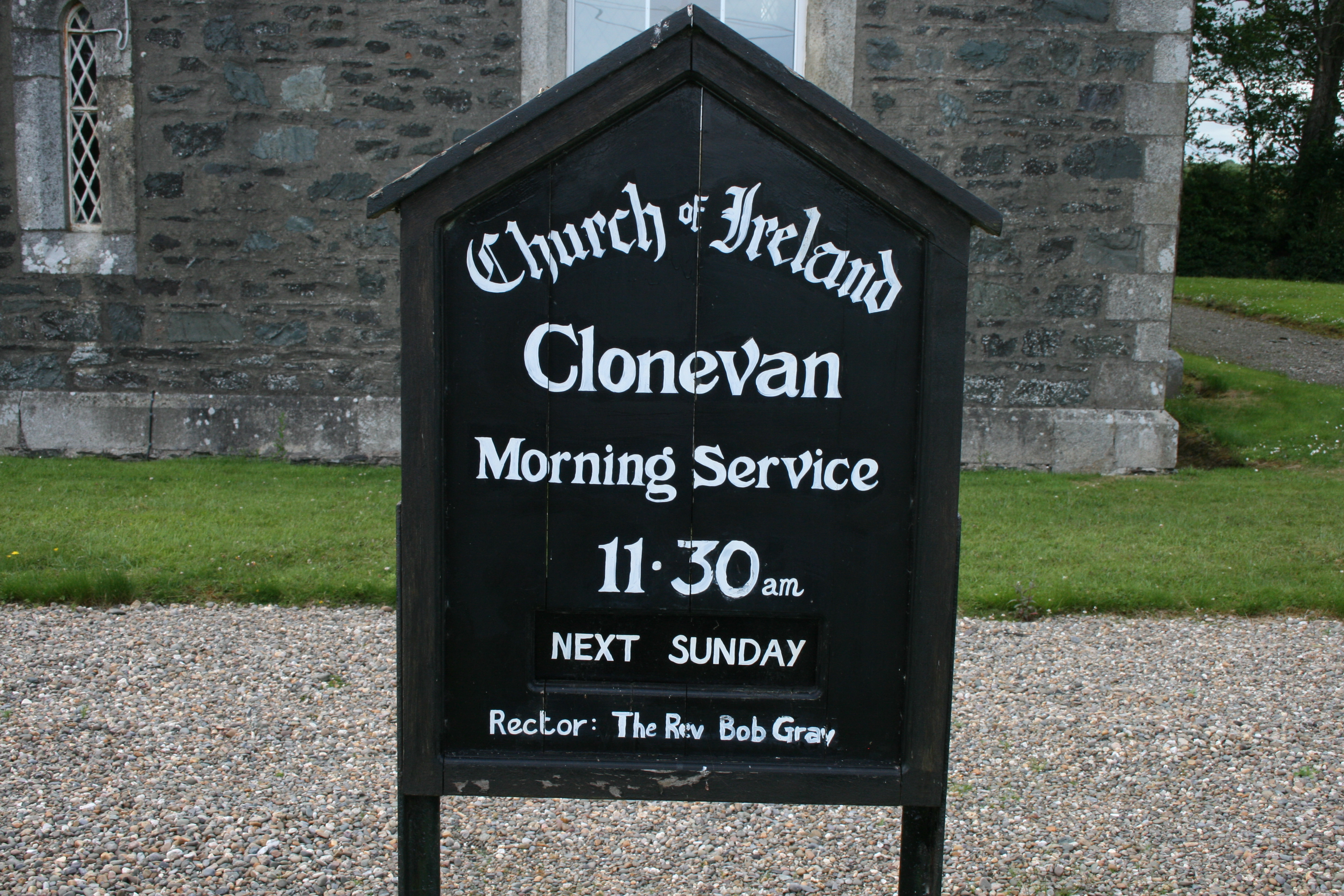

St. Patrick's Church at Clonevan (also spelt Clonevin) is in the Church of Ireland parish of Ardamine, County Wexford in the Diocese of Cashel and Ossory. The church is located on the R742 road south of the village of Ballygarrett near Cahore Point on the Wexford coast.

Cahore House at Clonlevan, which is presently unoccupied, was the home of the George family for several generations. It was built in the 1840s by John George, Solicitor General for Ireland, who had inherited land there from his father.

== Transport ==
Bus Éireann local route 379 serves Clonevan on Mondays and Saturdays only. On Mondays there is a bus at 11:08 am to Gorey and at 4:02 pm to Wexford. On Saturdays there is a bus to Gorey at 9:08 am and to Wexford at 12:36 pm.
