= R745 road (Ireland) =

Road in Ireland

R745 road
- Bóthar R745
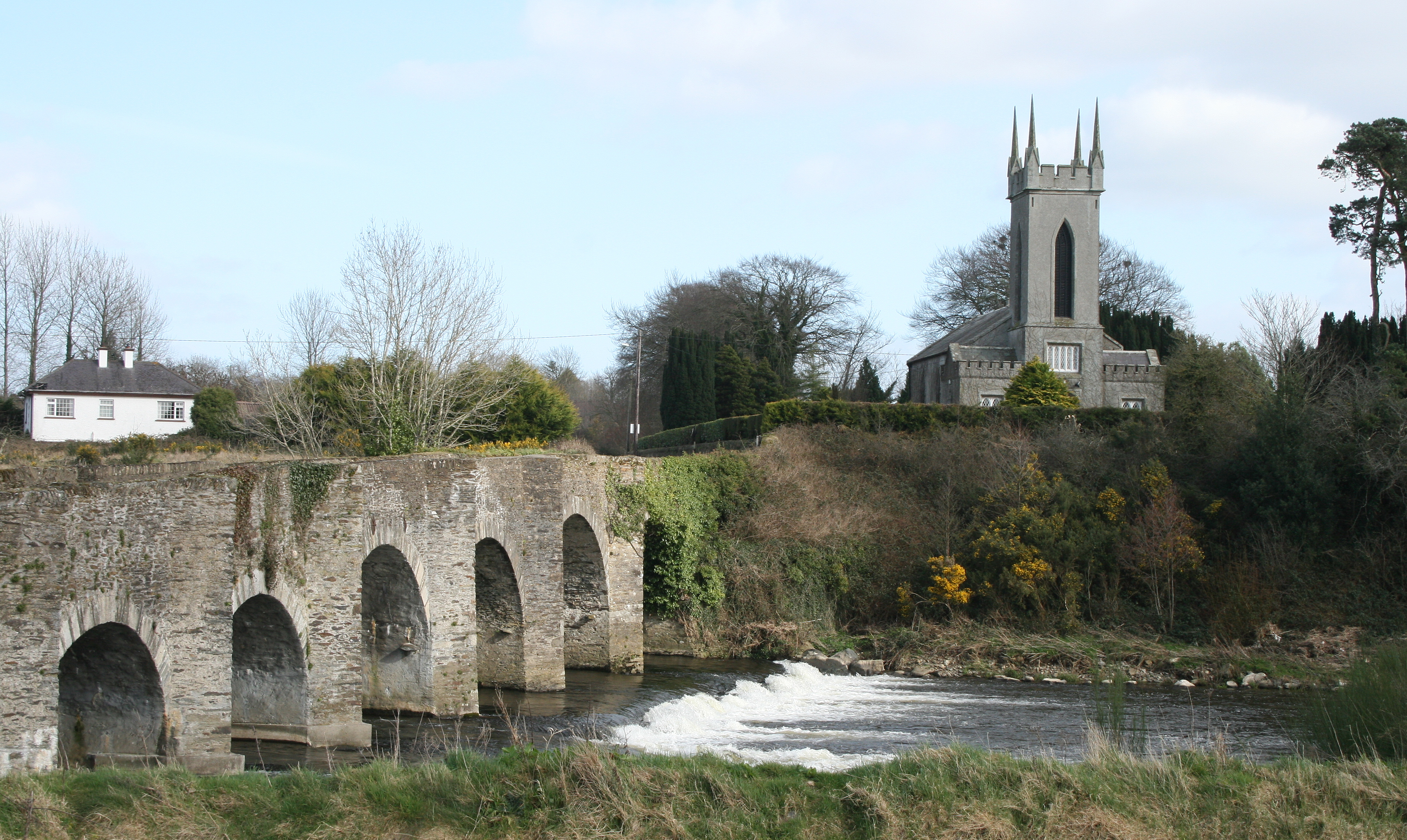
- Ballycarney Bridge carries R745 over River Slaney

Route information
- Length: 16.0 km (9.9 mi)

Major junctions
- From: R702 at Wheelagower, County Wexford
- N80 at Tomgarrow; Cross River Slaney at Ballycarney
- To: R772 at Main Street, Ferns

Location
- Country: Ireland

Highway system
- Roads in Ireland; Motorways; Primary; Secondary; Regional
← R744	→ R746

The R745 road is a regional road in County Wexford, Ireland. It connects the R702 road at Wheelagower with the R772 road (formerly N11) at Ferns. Following the opening of the M11 motorway from Gorey to Enniscorthy, parts of the N11 near the motorway were renumbered to R772.

The R745 passes through the villages of Ballindaggin and Ballycarney. The road is 16.0 km (9.9 mi) long.
