= Ballycarney =

Village in County Wexford, Ireland

Ballycarney Baile Uí Chearnaigh
- Village
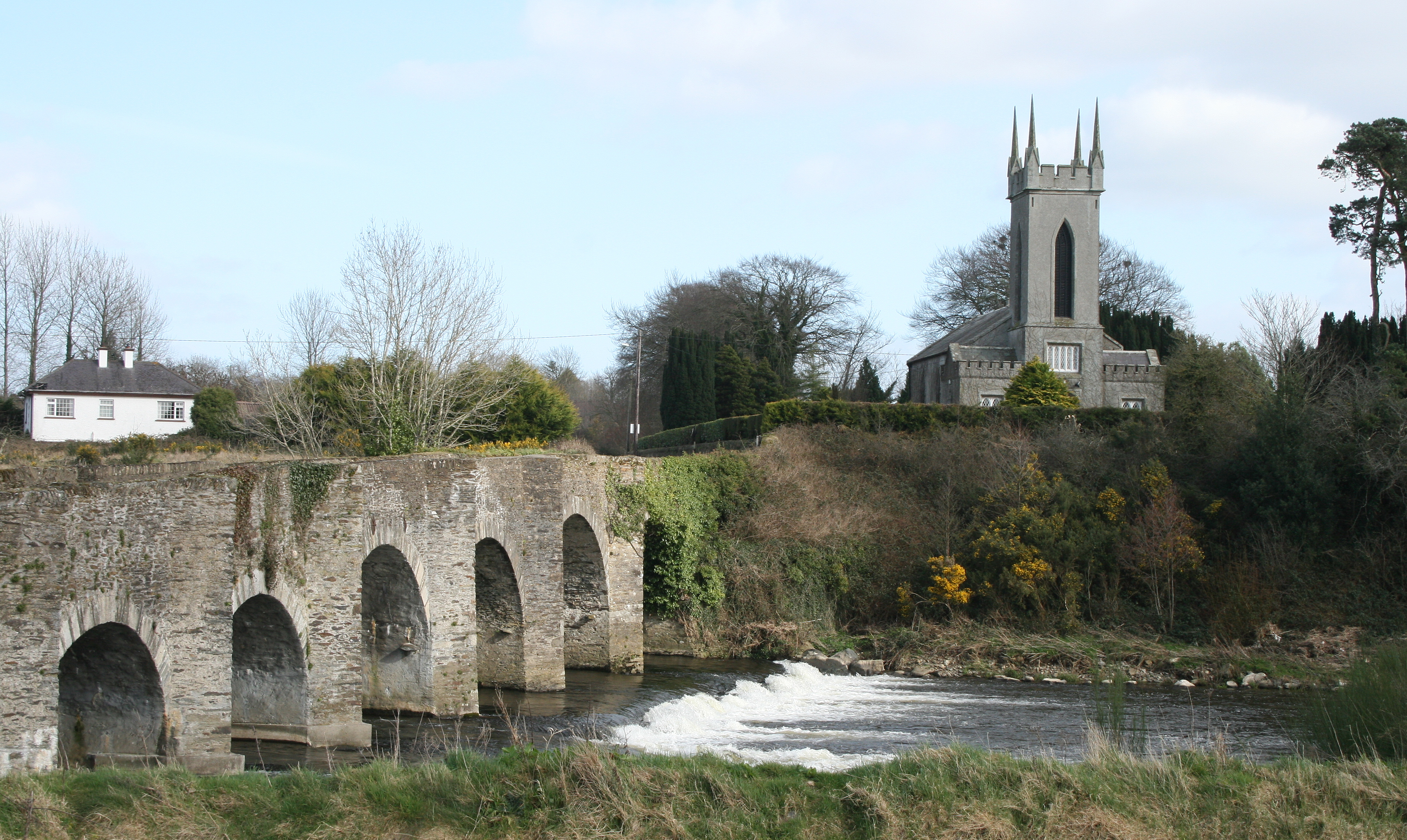
- Ballycarney Bridge crosses the River Slaney

- Location in Ireland
- Coordinates: 52°35′N 6°34′W
- Country: Ireland
- Province: Leinster
- County: County Wexford
- Time zone: UTC+0 (WET)
  - Summer (DST): UTC-1 (IST (WEST))

Ballycarney (Irish: Baile Uí Chearnaigh) is a small village in County Wexford in Ireland. It is located on the R745 regional road on the east bank of the River Slaney. It is centred on All Saints Ballycarney Church of Ireland chapel, which sits on a height overlooking the river. Ballycarney is about 5 km (3 mi) west of Ferns and 11 km (7 mi) north of Enniscorthy. It is also home to the Ballycarney Inn. The village is in a townland and civil parish of the same name.

== See also ==
- List of towns and villages in Ireland
