= Clogh, County Wexford =

Clogh An Chloch
- Village
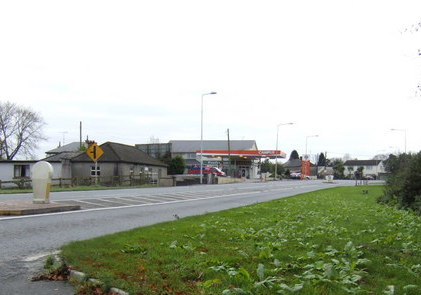
- Until bypassed in 2007, the village was on the N11 road

- Location in Ireland
- Coordinates: 52°38′N 6°20′W
- Country: Ireland
- Province: Leinster
- County: County Wexford
- Time zone: UTC+0 (WET)
  - Summer (DST): UTC-1 (IST (WEST))
- Irish Grid Reference: T121558

Clogh (Irish: An Chloch) is a small rural village in Ireland. Many local residents refer to the village as "Clough", and this is regarded as the proper spelling.

It is situated on the R772 regional road in County Wexford 5 km (3.1 mi) southwest of Gorey. Until it was bypassed in July 2007 the village was situated on the N11 national primary route from Wexford Town to Dublin.

There is a memorial to the Battle of Tubberneering in the village. St. Luke's church (Church of Ireland), just north of the village, was built in 1831.

== See also ==
- List of towns and villages in Ireland
