= Seal Rescue Ireland =

Animal welfare organisation in Ireland

Seal Rescue Ireland is a conservation non-profit, headquartered in County Wexford, Ireland. According to the BBC, its main work includes "rescuing, rehabilitating and releasing orphaned and sick seals from across the country."

== History ==
Both common and grey seals are cared for by a team of volunteers at its seal visitor and rehabilitation centre in Courtown, County Wexford. In 2019, it restored Courtown Woods. In January 2020, it advocated for closing a beach in County Wicklow for nine months out of the year to protect a colony of seals. In the same month, they noted that rare seals, usually found in the Arctic, were appearing off the coasts of Cork and Kerry and they reduced their first, and so far only, arctic ringed seal. As of May 2020, its CEO was Melanie Croce and it had 1.2 million followers on TikTok. In February 2021, it launched a marine conservation virtual learning tool in collaboration with SSE Renewables. It began to collaborate with Orca Ireland and the National Parks and Wildlife Service (NPWS), sharing their database of dead seals in order to attain a better understanding of the causes of seal deaths.

Injured or orphaned seal pups in Seal Rescue Ireland's care are comforted by "fake mums" which are made from old wetsuits. The "wetsuit mums" are designed to look and feel like adult seals. They are placed with the orphaned pups in the centre's intensive care unit. Seal Rescue Ireland adopted the use of "Ecobricks", a building material consisting of plastic bottles which are tightly packed with soft plastics. The bricks have been used by to make furniture, such as stools. Seal Rescue Ireland hosts Marine Conservation Roadshows and school tours to educate schoolchildren on threats to seals and ways to reduce them.
