= R741 road (Ireland) =

Road in Ireland

R741 road
- Bóthar R741
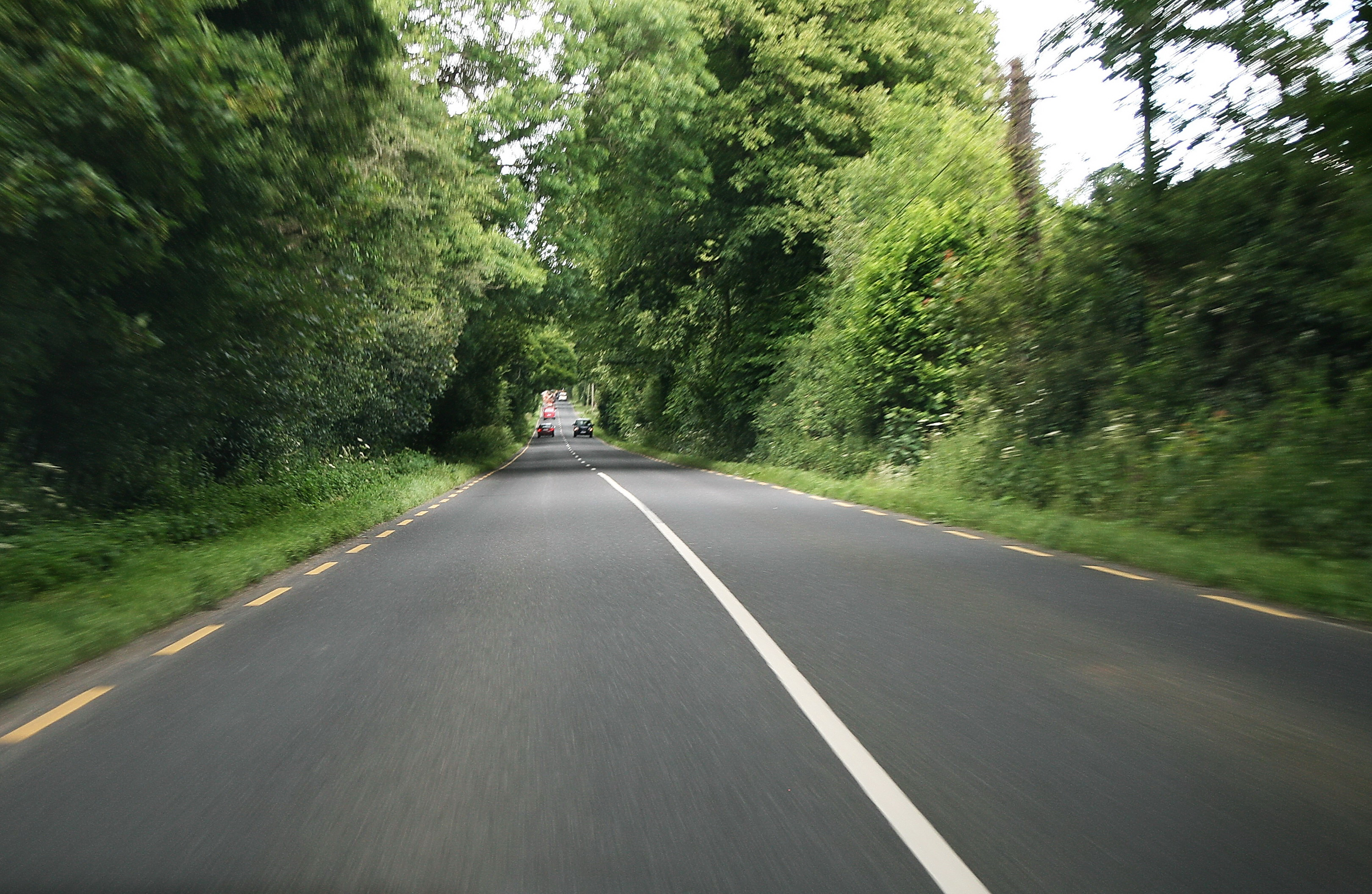
- R741 – high quality regional road

Route information
- Length: 40 km (25 mi)

Location
- Country: Ireland
- Primary destinations: County Wexford; Gorey – Leave the R772; Crosses over the Dublin-Rosslare Europort railway line; Passes under M11; Ballycanew; Ballyedmond; Passes Monamolin; Passes Oulart; (R744); Castlebridge; (R742); Crosses the River Slaney estuary; Wexford Town terminates at the R730.

Highway system
- Roads in Ireland; Motorways; Primary; Secondary; Regional

The R741 road is a regional road in County Wexford, Ireland. From its junction with the R772 in Gorey it takes a southerly route to its junction with the R730 in the centre of Wexford Town, where it terminates.

The road is of good quality, well surfaced and lined, throughout. It is used as an alternative route to the N11 national primary road for traffic between Gorey and Wexford Town.

In the vicinity of the R744 at Castle Ellis, the road is known locally as "the new line", constructed in the 1820s.

The traditional iconic view of Wexford Town is the bridge over the Slaney sweeping across in the foreground with the town behind it (for an example see ). The bridge is the final stage of R741 southwards.

The road is 40 km (25 mi) long.

== See also ==
- Roads in Ireland
- National primary road
- National secondary road
