= Courtown =

Village in County Wexford, Ireland

Courtown Baile na Cúirte
- Village
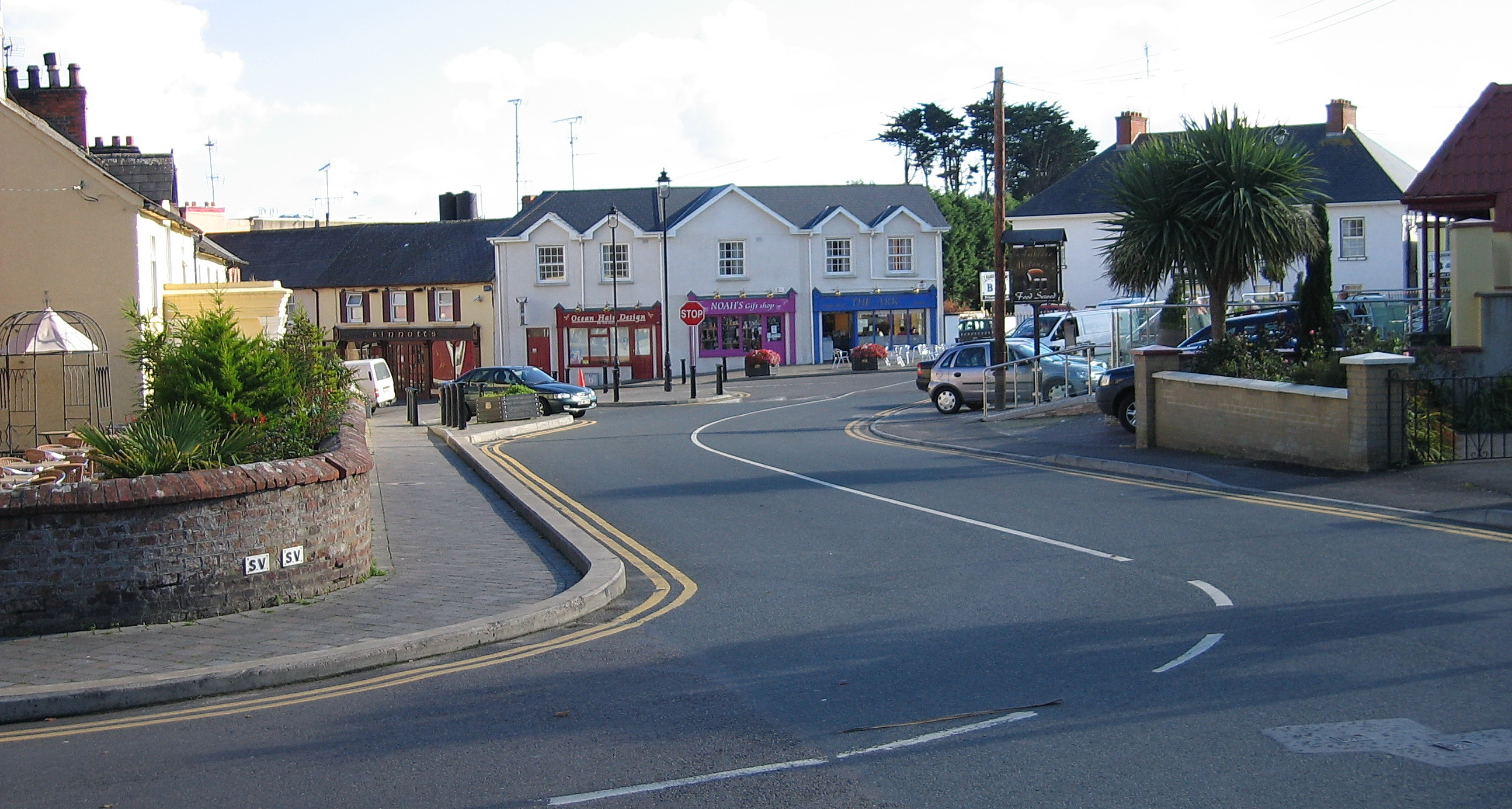
- Courtown centre

- Location in Ireland
- Coordinates: 52.645°N 6.229°W
- Country: Ireland
- Province: Leinster
- County: County Wexford
- Elevation: 6 m (20 ft)

Population (2022)
  - Total: 4,365
- (Urban area as defined by the 2022 census)
- Irish Grid Reference: T196562

Courtown (Irish: Baile na Cúirte) is a village in County Wexford, Ireland. It was developed after Lord Courtown ordered the construction of a harbour during the Famine years, 1839–1846. The economic boost of the new harbour led to a small village developing with fishing being the primary economy of the village.

Courtown lies on the R742 regional road, around 6 km south-east of Gorey. It is situated on the Irish Sea coast and with the recent development during the Celtic Tiger years, has merged into the adjoining village of Riverchapel. As a result, population has trebled from 2006, reaching 4,365 in 2022.

== Development and amenities ==
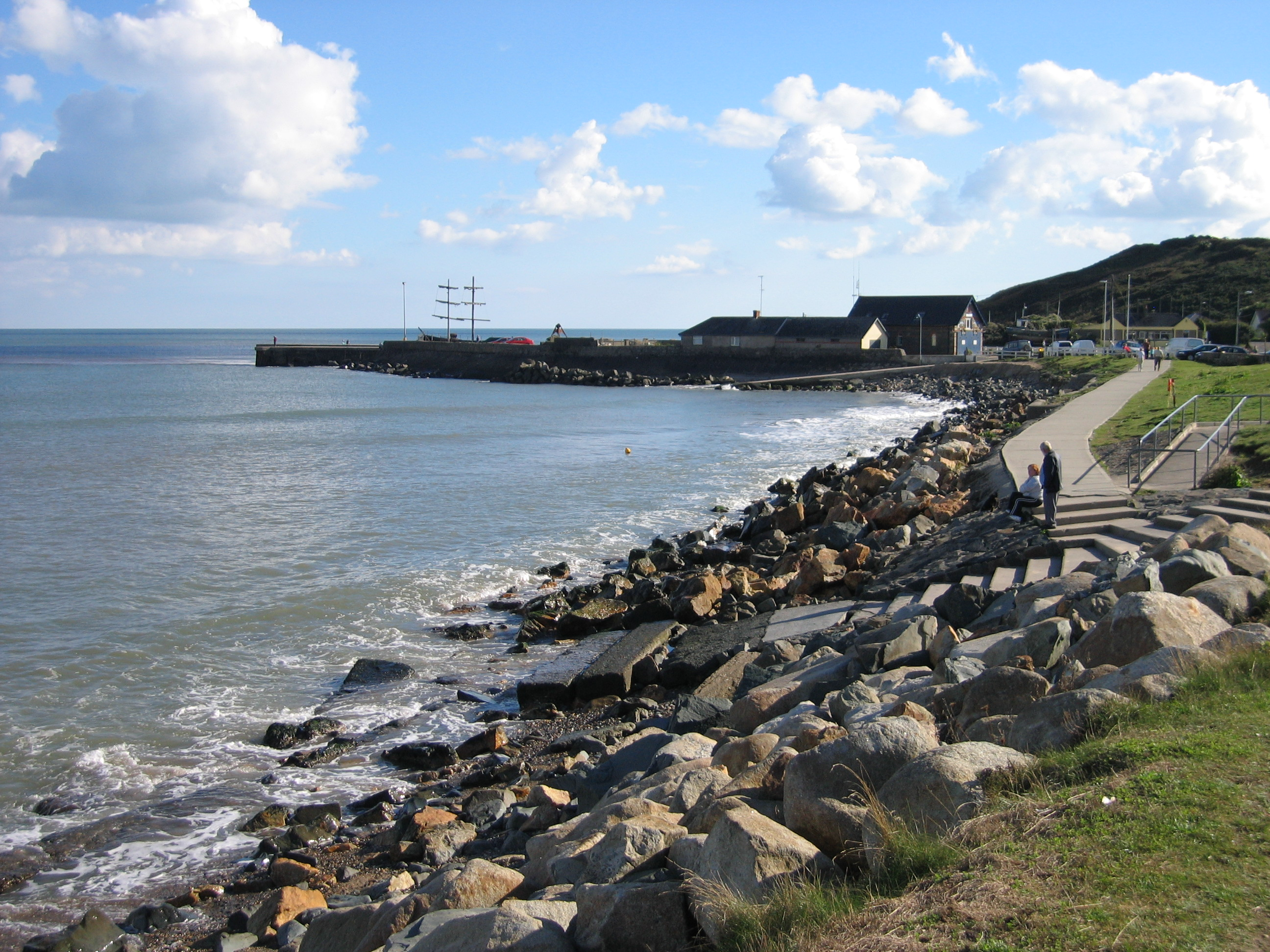
Courtown Harbour

The name Courtown originally applied to a townland in North Wexford, 4 kilometres east of Gorey town. The townland was home to the seat of Lord Courtown during the 18th and 19th centuries. Courtown House was demolished in 1962. The remains of his private church and cemetery can still be seen in the townland. Today it is home to Courtown Golf Club and Kiltennel Church.

In the late 20th and early 21st century, significant urbanisation has taken place, especially in Riverchapel, just south of Courtown Harbour. Large housing estates are now home to commuters working in Dublin. While the population of Courtown is somewhat smaller, the census combines the area of Courtown, Riverchapel and Ardamine. As of the 2006 census the population of this area was 1,421, and had grown to 4,365 by the time of the 2022 census.

Courtown is home to 'The Dinky Take-Away', serving the "best chips in Ireland", as voted on Marty Whelan's morning show on the 2FM radio station. Courtown also has a confectionary shop, ice-cream shop, and hair salons.

The town features crazy golf, amusement rides, ten-pin bowling, a golf course, as well as a beach and forest park.

Courtown Lifeboat Station was opened by the Royal National Lifeboat Institution in 1865, rebuilt on its present site in 1911, but closed in 1925. It reopened in 1990 as the base for an inshore lifeboat.

Seal Rescue Ireland (SRI), a charity organisation that works to rescue, rehabilitate and release sick or injured seals, is based in Courtown.

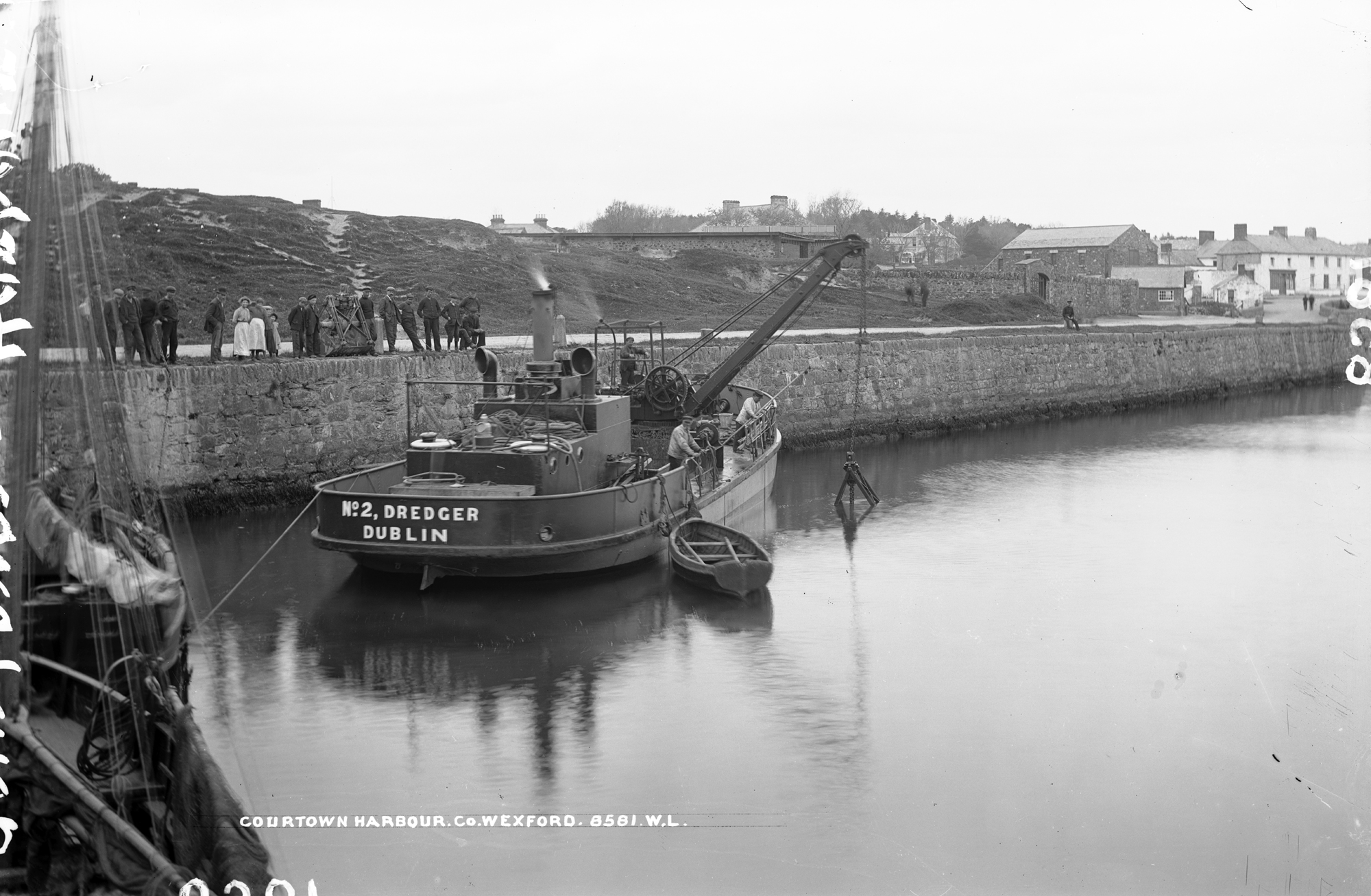
The main attraction during historical times was Courtown Harbour

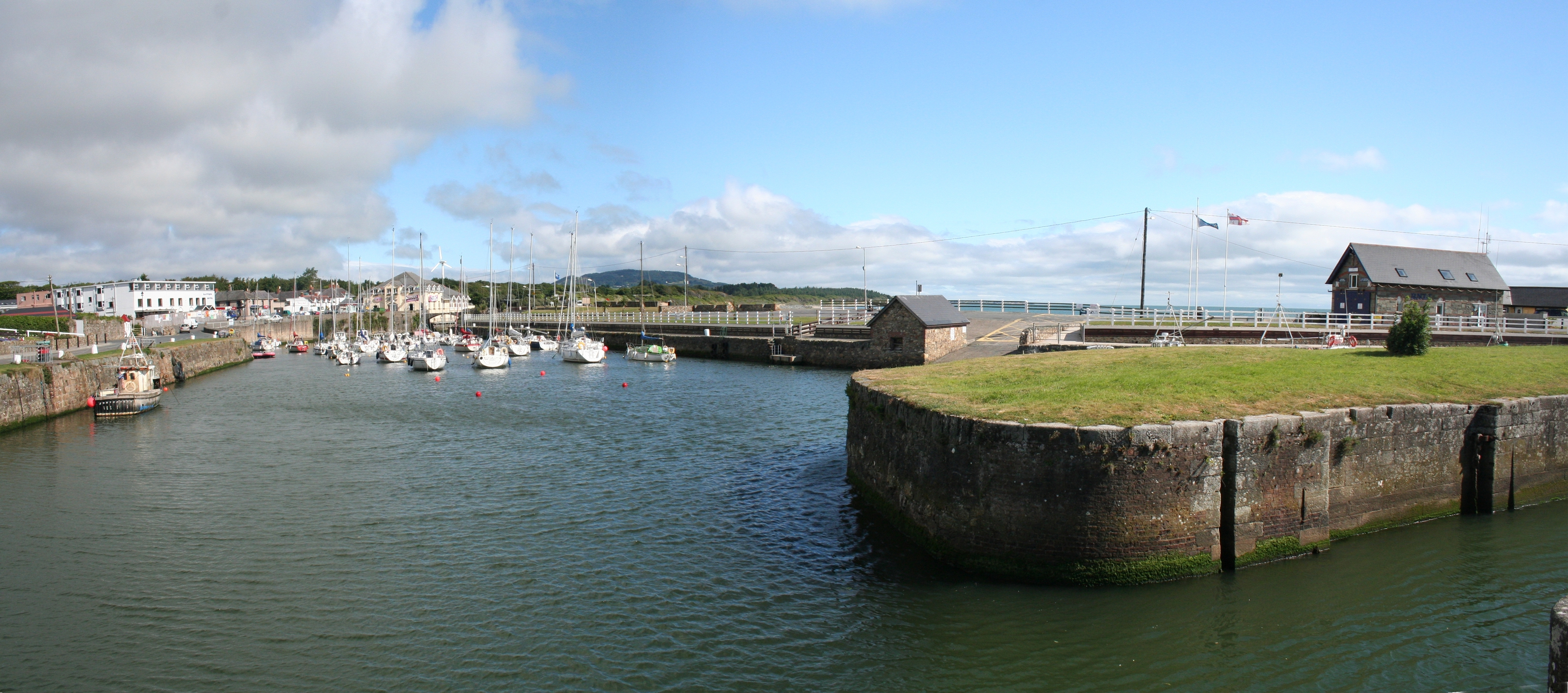
Courtown Harbour

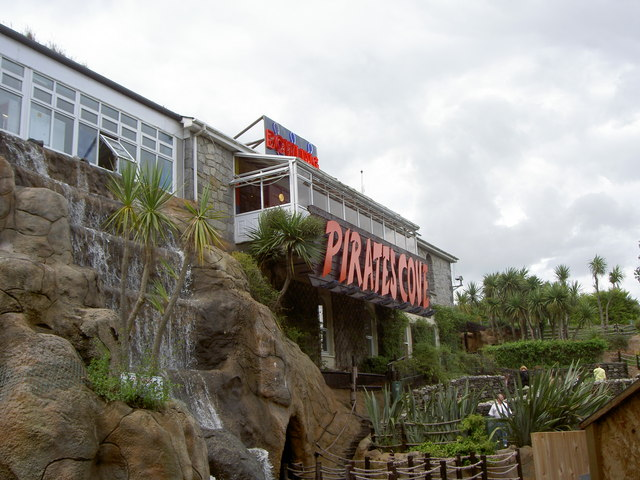
Pirates Cove in Courtown

== Transport ==
There is a bus once a day (except on Sundays) to and from Gorey, departing in the morning and returning in the afternoon. On Mondays and Saturdays Bus Éireann route 379 operates and continues to Wexford via Curracloe. Route 879 operates on Tuesdays, Thursdays and Fridays. On Wednesdays, the service is provided by the Rural Roadrunner bus operated by Wexford Local Development.

The nearest station is Gorey railway station, around 7 kilometres away.

== Tourism ==
As a harbour and seaside village, there is a high tourism rate during the months of the summer (May–August). Local tourist accommodation types include a number of bed and breakfasts, guesthouses, and caravan and holiday parks.

== History ==
Historical population
Year	Pop.	±%
1841	248	—
1851	607	+144.8%
1861	480	−20.9%
1871	613	+27.7%
1881	512	−16.5%
1891	438	−14.5%
1901	462	+5.5%
1911	414	−10.4%
1926	344	−16.9%
1936	316	−8.1%
1946	294	−7.0%
1951	257	−12.6%
1956	411	+59.9%
1961	396	−3.6%
1966	421	+6.3%
1971	291	−30.9%
1981	337	+15.8%
1986	317	−5.9%
1991	343	+8.2%
1996	364	+6.1%
2002	502	+37.9%
2006	1,421	+183.1%
2011	2,857	+101.1%
2016	3,591	+25.7%
2022	4,365	+21.6%

The name 'Courtown' dates to 1278, but the harbour was not built until the mid-1800s as a response by Lord Courtown to the Great Famine, and cost £25,000 to complete. Courtown was by then already well known for its beaches, but the presence of the harbour made it a fashionable destination, with people from Dublin and the midlands frequenting the village and beaches. Its popularity as a summer holiday resort for Dublin people increased after 1863, when the railway line from Dublin reached nearby Gorey.

== See also ==
- List of towns and villages in Ireland
- List of RNLI stations
