= R742 road (Ireland) =

Road in Ireland

R742 road
- Bóthar R742
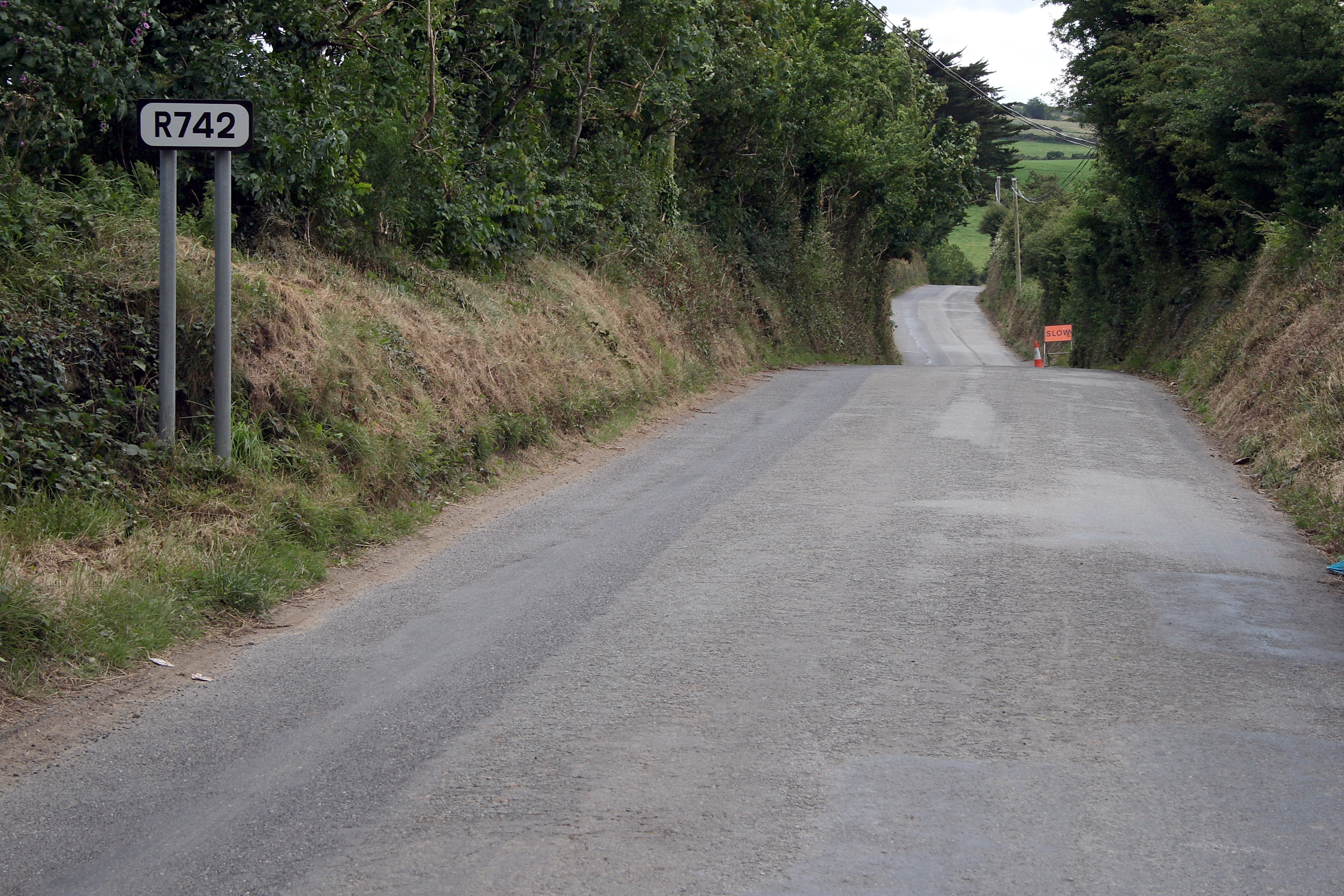
- R742 unlined, poor surface

Route information
- Length: 45 km (28 mi)

Location
- Country: Ireland
- Primary destinations: County Wexford; Gorey – Leave the R772; Crosses under the M11.; Courtown; Riverchapel; Ballygarrett; Passes Clonevin Cross Roads; Passes the Ballywater Wind Farm; Kilmuckridge; Blackwater – (R744); Curracloe – (R743); Two kilometers north of Wexford Town terminates at the R741.

Highway system
- Roads in Ireland; Motorways; Primary; Secondary; Regional

The R742 road is a regional road in County Wexford, Ireland. From its junction with the R772 in Gorey it takes a southerly route to its junction with the R741 north of Wexford Town where it terminates.

Though the road passes through many popular seaside resorts and villages undergoing extensive growth, it remains virtually unchanged since it was first paved with long stretches of narrow, winding, unmarked and worn surfacing (as of 2007).

The road is 45 km (28 mi) long.

== See also ==
- Roads in Ireland
- National primary road
- National secondary road
