= Oulart =

Village in County Wexford, Ireland

Oulart Irish: An tAbhallort
- Village
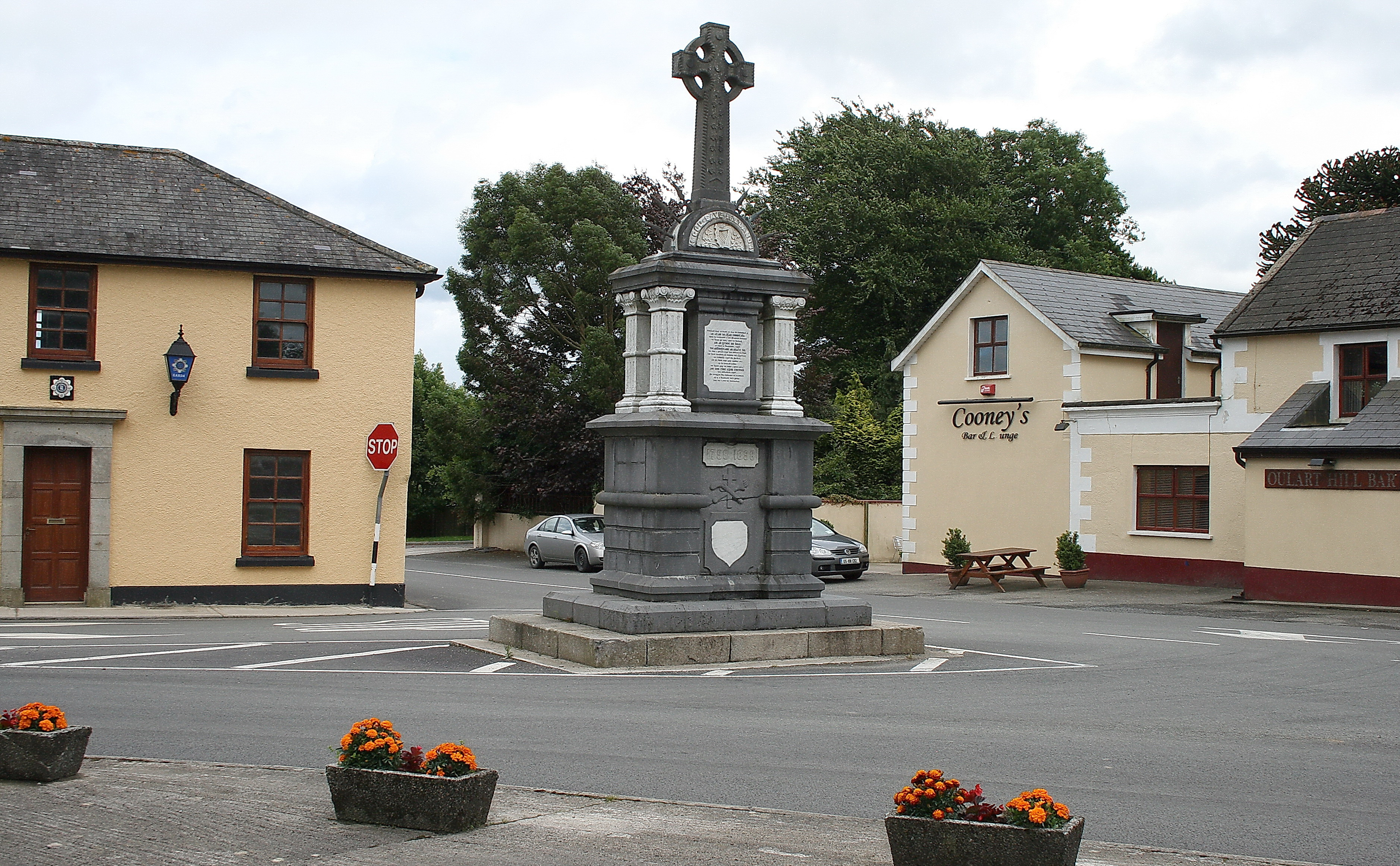
- 1798 centenary memorial in Oulart

- Location in Ireland
- Coordinates: 52°30′18″N 6°23′24″W
- Country: Ireland
- Province: Leinster
- County: County Wexford
- Elevation: 71 m (233 ft)

Population (2016)
  - Total: 274
- Time zone: UTC+0 (WET)
  - Summer (DST): UTC-1 (IST (WEST))
- Irish Grid Reference: T093401

Oulart (Irish: An tAbhallort, formerly Ubhallghort meaning 'the orchard'), is a small village in County Wexford in Ireland. Oulart had a population of 197 people in 2006, 257 in 2011, and 274 according to the 2016 census. The Battle of Oulart Hill took place in the area during the 1798 rebellion.

== Geography ==
Oulart is situated just off the R741 regional road halfway between the towns of Gorey to the north and Wexford to the south.

Nearby townlands include Raheenduff (or "black little fort" in English) which is to the north of Oulart village and is home of a grain store, shop and public house. The townlands of Kilnamanagh and Kyle are home to businesses such as a plant nursery, pubs, a supermarket, and an auto services business.

== Sport ==
The local Gaelic Athletic Association club, Oulart–The Ballagh, fields hurling and camogie teams. The club has won the Wexford Senior Hurling Championship on thirteen occasions, most recently in 2016. It has twelve Wexford Senior Camogie Championship titles.

== See also ==
- The Ballagh
- List of towns and villages in Ireland
