= The Ballagh =

Village in County Wexford, Ireland

The Ballagh An Bealach (Irish) Ballaghkeen
- Village
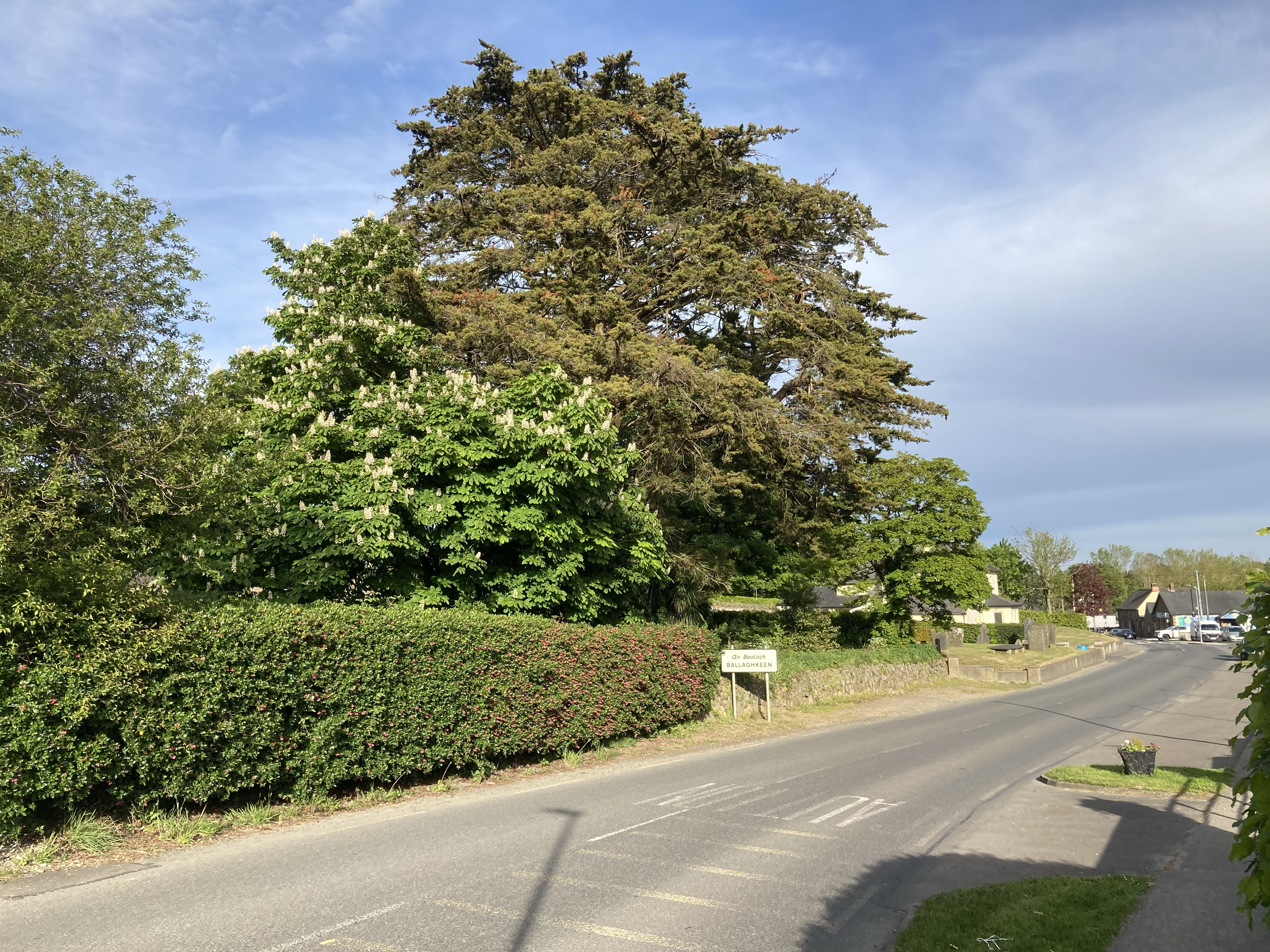
- Signage on the R744 entering Ballaghkeen (An Bealach)

- Location in Ireland
- Coordinates: 52°28′48″N 6°25′22″W
- Country: Ireland
- Province: Leinster
- County: County Wexford

Population (2022)
  - Total: 560

The Ballagh or Ballaghkeen (Irish: An Bealach, meaning 'the way') is a village in the southeastern corner of Ireland. It is situated in County Wexford just off the R741 regional road halfway between the towns of Gorey to the north and Wexford to the south. As of the 2022 census, the village had a population of 560 people.

== History ==
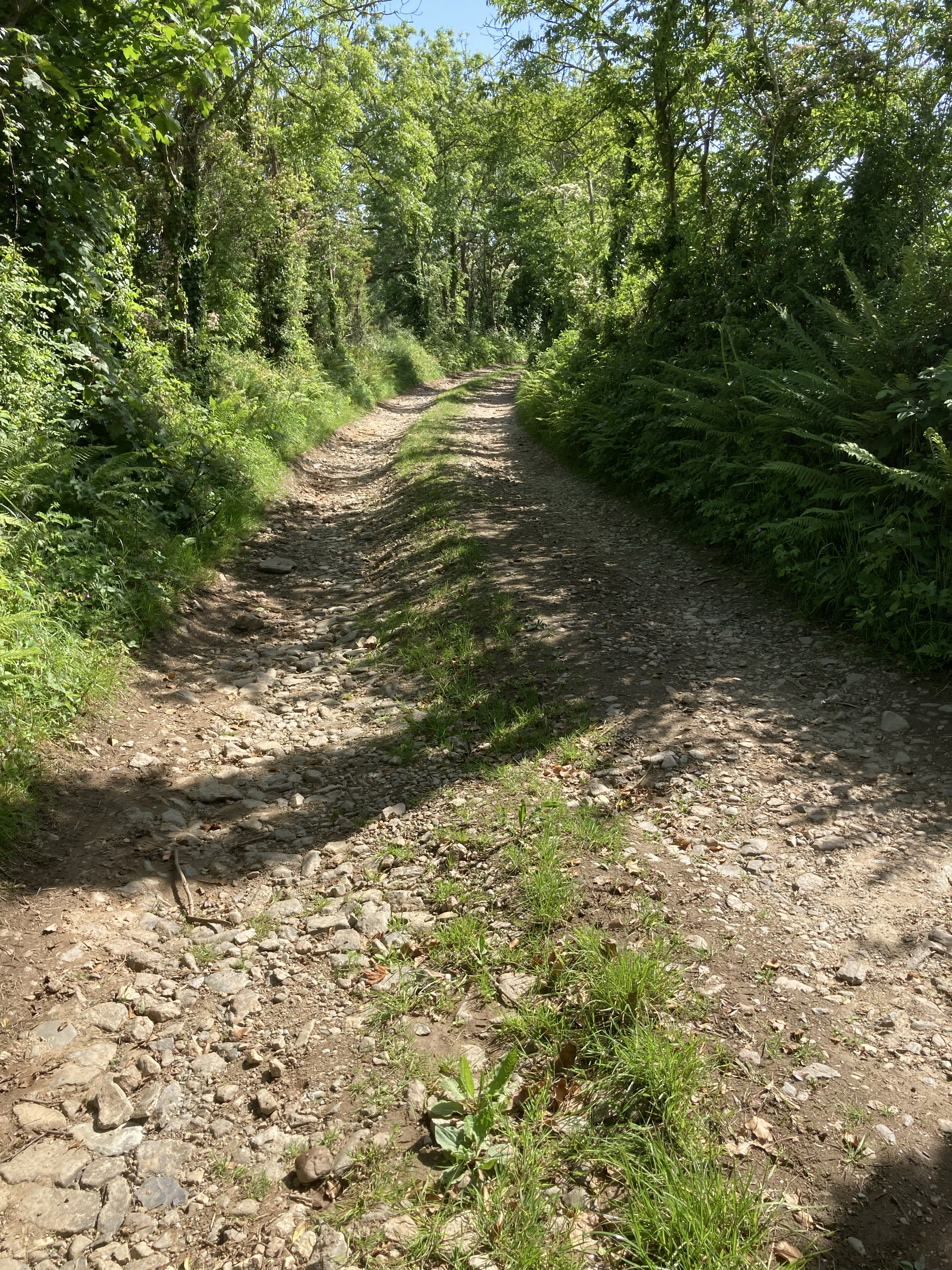
Gaby's Lane, near The Ballagh, forms part of the medieval road from Wexford to Gorey

Evidence of ancient settlement in the area includes a number of ring ditch, ringfort and moated sites in the townlands of Ballymacoonoge, Ballymurry, Glentire and Slievenagrane.

About 1 km east of the village is part of the medieval road which linked Wexford to Dublin. This road went into decline when the R741, known locally as 'the new line', was built a few decades after the 1798 Rebellion. Having been ambushed at pinch points and at the bottom of hills on the existing road, the R741 was built wider and straighter so that troops could be moved quickly to this area in the event of another insurrection.

The local Catholic church, in Ballymurry townland, was constructed in 1951. The nearby cemetery contains gravestones dating from the 1820s to the mid-20th century.

== Amenities ==
The village contains a national (primary) school, church, community centre and health clinic. It also has a shop and post office along with two pubs.

The Catholic church in The Ballagh (Ballaghkeene) is dedicated to St John the Baptist and is within the Diocese of Ferns.

The local primary school, Ballaghkeene National School, opened in 1973. As of 2025, the school had an enrollment of approximately 140 pupils.

== Sport ==
Oulart the Ballagh is the local Gaelic Athletic Association club. As reflected in the name, the club takes players from The Ballagh and the nearby village of Oulart. The club has won the Wexford Senior Hurling Championship on 13 occasions, most recently in 2016. In March 2012, Oulart the Ballagh won the All-Ireland Senior Club Camogie Championship.

The Ballagh also has a boxing club where the Olympian Adam Nolan previously trained.

== Demographics ==
Between the 2011 and 2016 census, the population of The Ballagh increased from 477 to 515 people. Around this time, a number of new housing estates were developed (or planned to be developed) within the periphery of the village. By time of the 2022 census, The Ballagh had a population of 560 people.
