= Ballygarrett =

Village in County Wexford, Ireland

Coordinates: 52°34′24″N 6°13′48″W

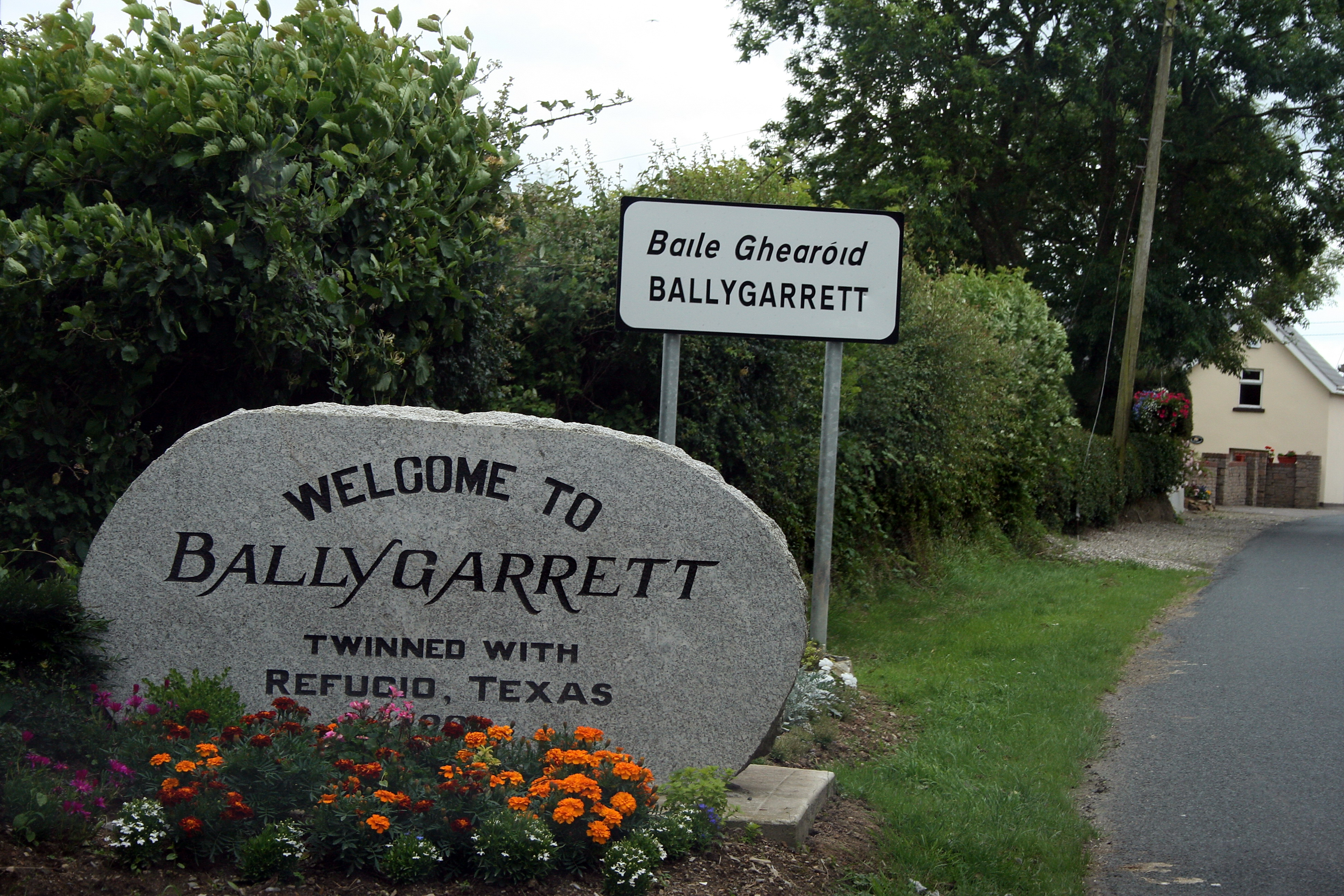
Signage entering Ballygarrett

Ballygarrett (Irish: Baile Ghearóid, meaning 'town of Garrett') is a rural village in the southeastern corner of Ireland. It is in County Wexford 12 km (7.5 mi) south-east of Gorey on the R742 road. The birthplace of Texas empresario James Power, Ballygarrett is twinned with Refugio, Texas.

== Transport ==
There is a bus once a day (not Sundays) to and from Gorey, departing in the morning and returning in the afternoon. On Mondays and Saturdays Bus Éireann route 379 operates and continues to Wexford via Curracloe. Route 879 operates on Tuesdays, Thursdays and Fridays. On Wednesdays the service is provided by the Rural Roadrunner bus operated by Wexford Local Development.

The nearest station is Gorey railway station, around 12 kilometres distance.

== Sport ==
The Gaelic Athletic Association club in Ballygarrett is called Réalt na Mara GAA club. In 1982, the old clubs of Réalt na Mara and Ballygarrett amalgamated to form the present-day club.

== See also ==
- List of towns and villages in Ireland
