= Ballyedmond =

Village in County Wexford, Ireland

Coordinates: 52°32′38″N 6°20′25″W

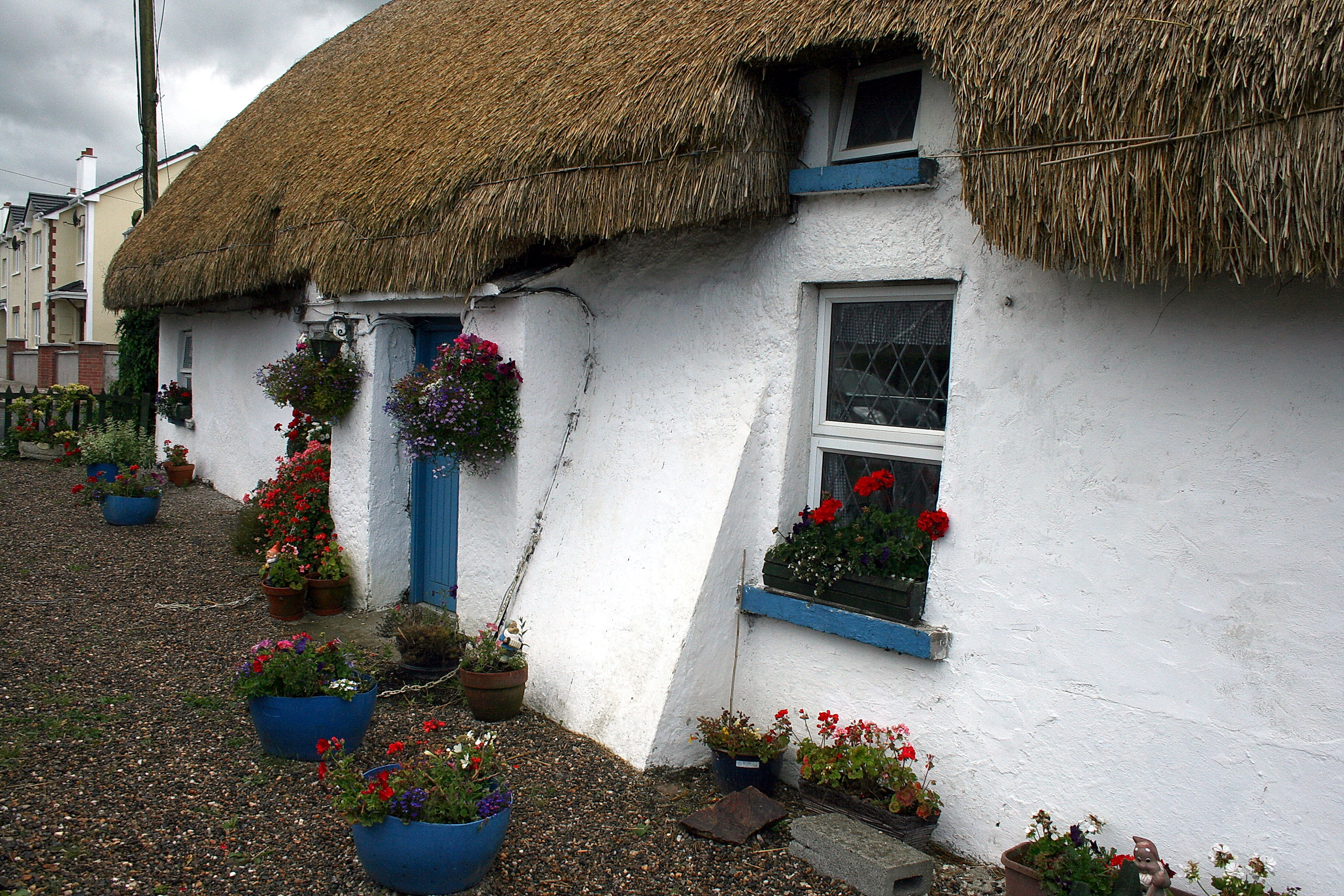
Cottage in Ballyedmond village

Ballyedmond (Irish: Baile Éamainn, meaning 'Edmond's town') is a small village and townland in County Wexford in Ireland. It is situated on the R741 regional road.

According to the 2016 census, the village had a population of 121, up slightly from 116 inhabitants in the 2011 census.

== See also ==
- List of towns and villages in Ireland
