= McMurphy =

Irish surname

McMurphy, and its variants MacMurphy, Murphy and Murchison are anglicisations of the Irish language surname Mac Murchaidh. Mac Murchaidh has also been anglicised as McMurchy and MacMurchy. The clan originated in the ferns County Wexford such as Diarmaid mac Murchadha. In the 17th century the clan was found in County Armagh. There are different origins than the Wexford, Cork and Fermanagh County septs.

== Overview ==
The name Murchadh comes from the Irish words muir (meaning "sea") and cath (meaning "battle"). The name therefore comes to mean "Sea Warrior" Over time the name has been Anglicised as Murphy, MacMurphy, Murchison and MacMurchie but most commonly as Murphy.

== Origins of the clan in Ulster ==
McMurphy was the surname of a branch of the Cenél nEógain. They were originally native to the district of Munterbirn (now in the barony of Dungannon) and Tullyanvey (Tellach Ainbhith, in the neighbouring barony of Strabane), where they were chiefs of Siol Aodha, the "seed of Hugh". Their eponymous ancestor was one Murchad of this sept, who was alive in the 10th or 11th century.

== Pedigree ==
The Clann Birnn's pedigree is Bern mac Ruadrí mac Murchad mac Máel Dúin mac Áeda Alláin. Their co-relatives are McRory and O'Friel.

== McMurphy of Munterbirn ==
The earliest reference to the name in Ulster occurs in 1172, when "Mulmaire McMurphy, lord of Munterbirn, was slain by Hugh Magennis and the Clan Hugh of the Iveagh of Ulster" (Maol Maire Mac Murchadha toiseach Muinntire Birn do mharbhadh la h-Aedh Mac Aenghusa agus la Cloinn Aeda do Uibh Eachdach Uladh).

== The Fews ==
However, the McMurphy's were forcibly disposed and driven out by their more powerful O'Neill kinsmen, sometime in the 13th century. They subsequently settled in the highlands of south Armagh, ousting families such as Garvey, Hanratty and Callaghan.

Over the course of the next two hundred years, the Tyrone O'Neill's would expand into The Fews and make the McMurphy their vassals again. By the end of the 15th century they were centered on Dunreavey Wood. A fiant of 1602 names some one hundred and seventy free clansmen of the Fews, of whom thirty-five were McMurphy's.

== The Plantation and after ==
The townlands of Cashell and Legacroon in the barony of Orier were granted to McMurphy's c. 1610, but were seized by the time of Down Survey. There were seven McMurphy landholders in 1659, and twelve in 1664. The Hearth Money Roll of the same year lists several bearers of the name in Dorsey, Legmoylan, and Creggan, though none in Carnally. A census of 1766 listed at least eight families of the name in Carnally by that year. During the plantation, many Morrows came to Armagh from Scotland who were of the Scottish branch of MacMurchadha and mixed with the local families of MacMurchadha and MacMurchaidh.

Since the 17th century, MacMurchadha and MacMurchaidh have become anglicised as Morrow and MacMurphy or Murphy respectively. In Ulster, bearers of the name are found in their greatest concentrations in County Armagh, with similar numbers in County Fermanagh and County Monaghan.

== 21st century ==
Murphy is the single most common Irish surname. However, most Murphy's elsewhere in Ireland are unrelated, being descendants of various other Mac Murchaidh, Mac Murchadha, and Ó Murchadha families. Morrow's may stem from both the Scottish branch of MacMurchadha or from any of the Irish branches, and also from the Scottish name MacMuireadhaigh and tend to be also referred to as Scotch-Irish (or Scots-Irish) as well as Irish.

== Notables ==
- Niall Mór Mac Mac Murchaidh, poet, fl. 17th/18th century.
- Niall Óge Mac Mac Murchaidh, poet, fl. 18th century.
- Seamus McMurphy, poet and rapparee, 1720–1750.
- Sean Mac Murchaidh, poet, fl. 18th century.
- Raodhmann na Rannta Mac Murchaidh, poet, fl. 18th century.
- Mary Stuart James MacMurphy (1846–1934), American teacher, lecturer, clubwoman, and author
- James Murphy, member of Sinn Féin, 1887–1961.
- Mick Murphy, born 1942.
- Thomas Murphy, alleged former Chief of Staff, IRA, born 1949.
- Colm Murphy, cleared in two criminal trials but found liable in a civil case for the Omagh bombing, born 1952.
- Conor Murphy, Sinn Féin MP and former member of the IRA, born 1963.
- Alan Murphy, retired footballer, born 1978.
- Rev. Trevor Morrow, former moderator of the Presbyterian Church in Ireland and an Ecumenist.
- Colonel Henry A. Morrow, colonel of the 24th Michigan Volunteers, part of the Iron Brigade.
- Maj. Samuel Morrow, one of the Scotch-Irish Overmountain men who fought at the Battle of Kings Mountain.
- Jeremiah Morrow, 9th Governor of Ohio, the son of Irish immigrants and the namesake of Morrow, a village in Warren County and Morrow County, Ohio.

== See also ==
- List of Irish clans in Ulster
