= R772 road (Ireland) =

Road in Ireland

R772 road
- Bóthar R772

Route information
- Length: 76 km (47 mi)

Location
- Country: Ireland
- Primary destinations: County Wicklow; Newtownmountkennedy; Newcastle Hospital; Coynes Cross; Ashford; Rathnew; Arklow; County Wexford; Inch; Gorey; Clogh; Camolin; Ferns; Enniscorthy

Highway system
- Roads in Ireland; Motorways; Primary; Secondary; Regional

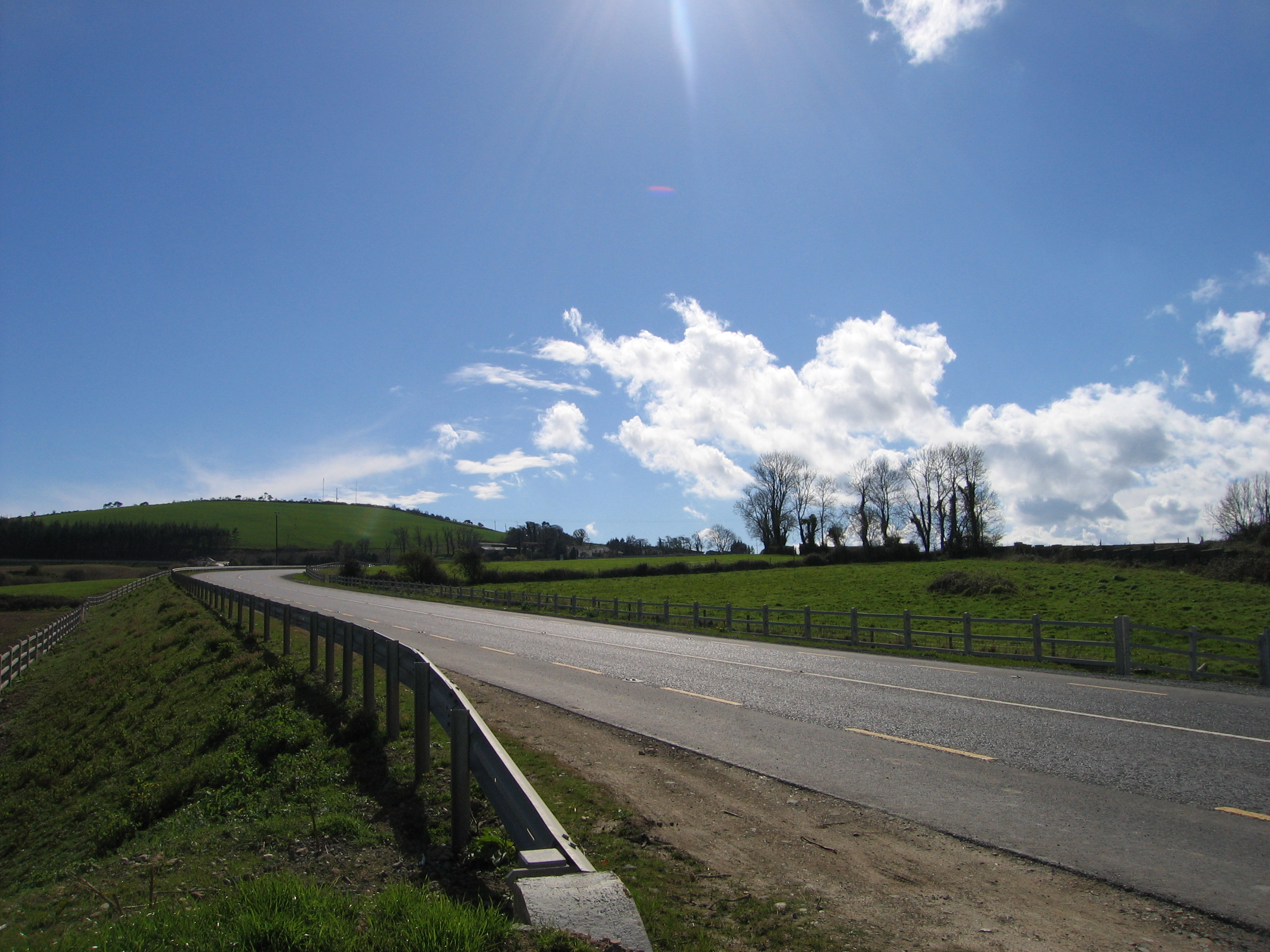
R772 south of Rathnew

The R772 road is a regional road in Ireland which comprises disconnected sections of road which once formed part of the N11 but which have now been by-passed, joined by some new road sections and some former local roads.

== Route (sections) ==
1. The first part of the R772 starts at J12 (Newtownmountkennedy North) on the N11. The route travels through the main street of Newtownmountkennedy, then on to Killadeernan and Newcastle Hospital. This route was the original R772. The road then travels southwest and then east up and down hill via existing single track local roads. The route then goes under the present N11 to Coynes Cross. The road follows the old N11 to Ashford, where it connects to the R764 at a roundabout in the village centre. The road then crosses the River Vartry and travels through Ashford, passing Mount Usher Gardens. The road continues over the N11 and into Rathnew. In Rathnew, the road takes a right turn at the village roundabout and continues to J17 (Wicklow South) of the N11.
2. The route begins again at J20 (Arklow North). The road travels through northern Arklow, over the River Avoca and up Arklow main street. The road then travels through south Arklow. The R772 then crosses the Wicklow-Wexford border and onwards via the old N11 to Inch. The road travels through Gorey, Clogh, and connects to J24 of the M11 at Clogh Roundabout. The road continues along the old N11 through Camolin and Ferns, and meets the N30 and N80 at the Scarawalsh Roundabout, and continues through the Clavass Roundabout. The route continues through Enniscorthy, meeting the R890 and R744 regional roads, and terminates at Scurlocksbush Roundabout, about 2 km north of Oylegate.

== Trivia ==
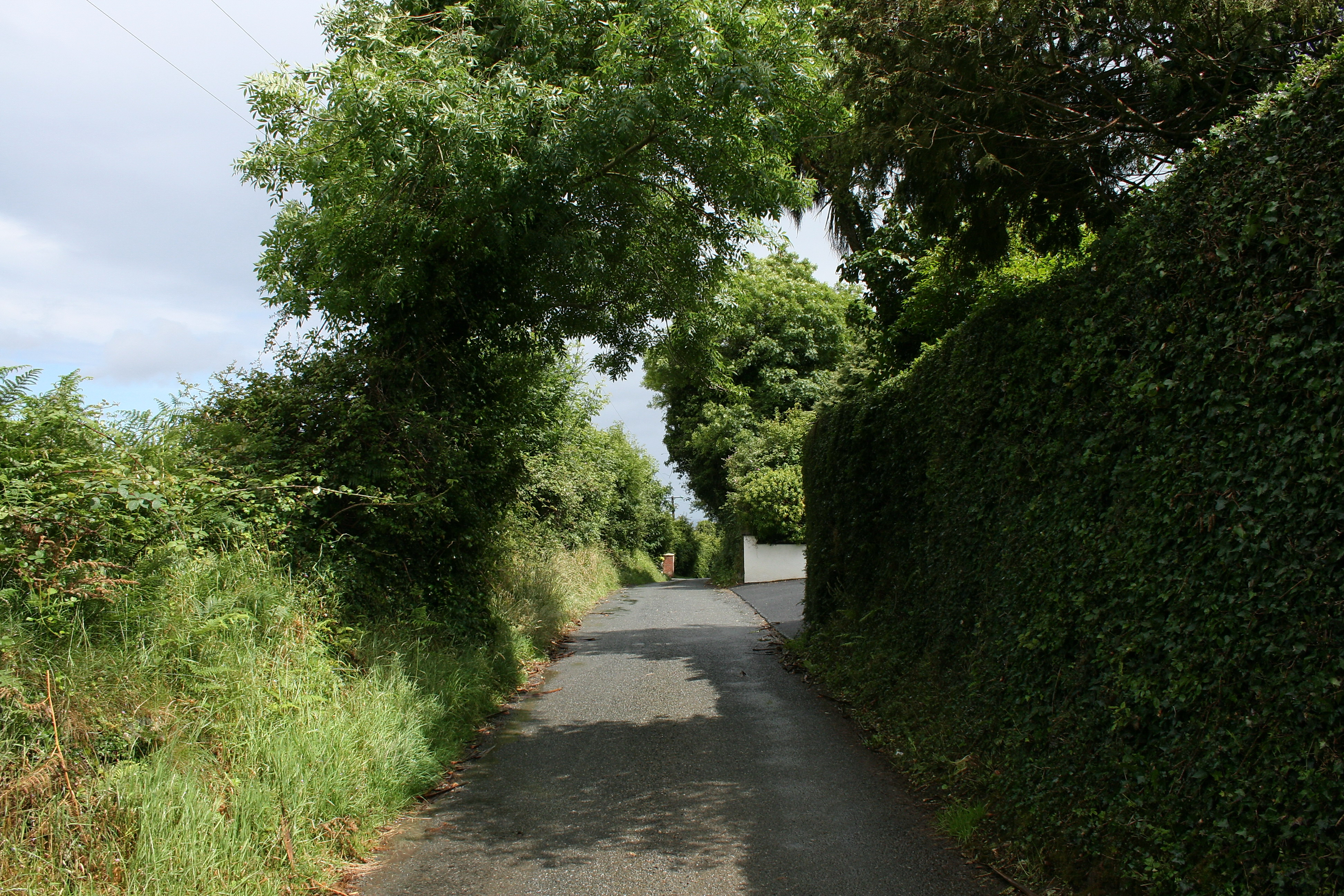
R772 at its single track section

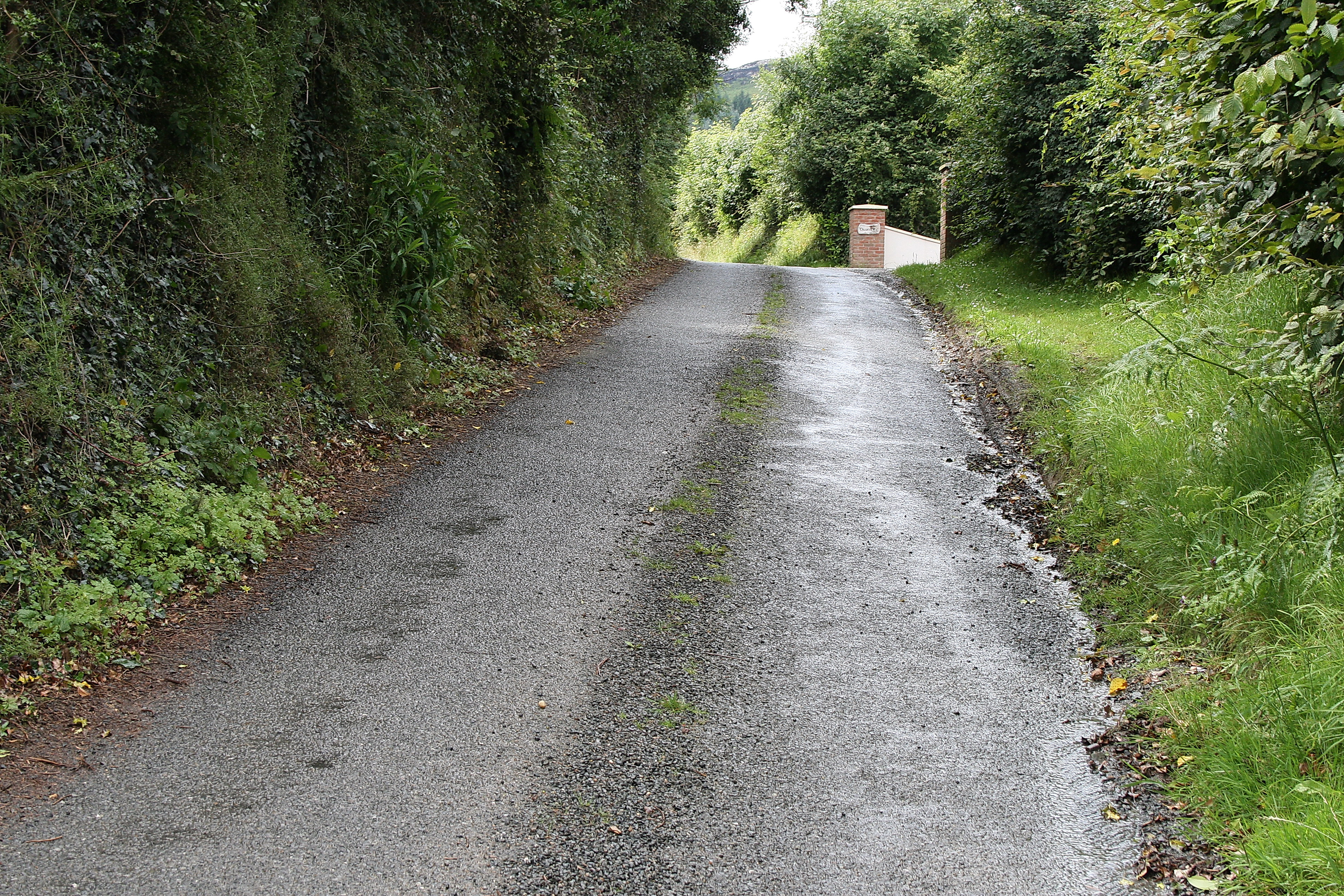
Central grass, one car-width on a NEW Regional route.

To follow the R772 after passing through the town of Newtownmountkennedy (southbound) you must take an unsigned right-turn into a local road; then after climbing nearly 2 km, there is an unmarked left turn into a single-track local access road which takes you downhill for a kilometre, under the new N11, to join the bypassed former N11.

== See also ==
- Roads in Ireland
- National primary road
- National secondary road
