= Curracloe =

Holiday village in County Wexford, Ireland

Curracloe Currach Cló
- Village
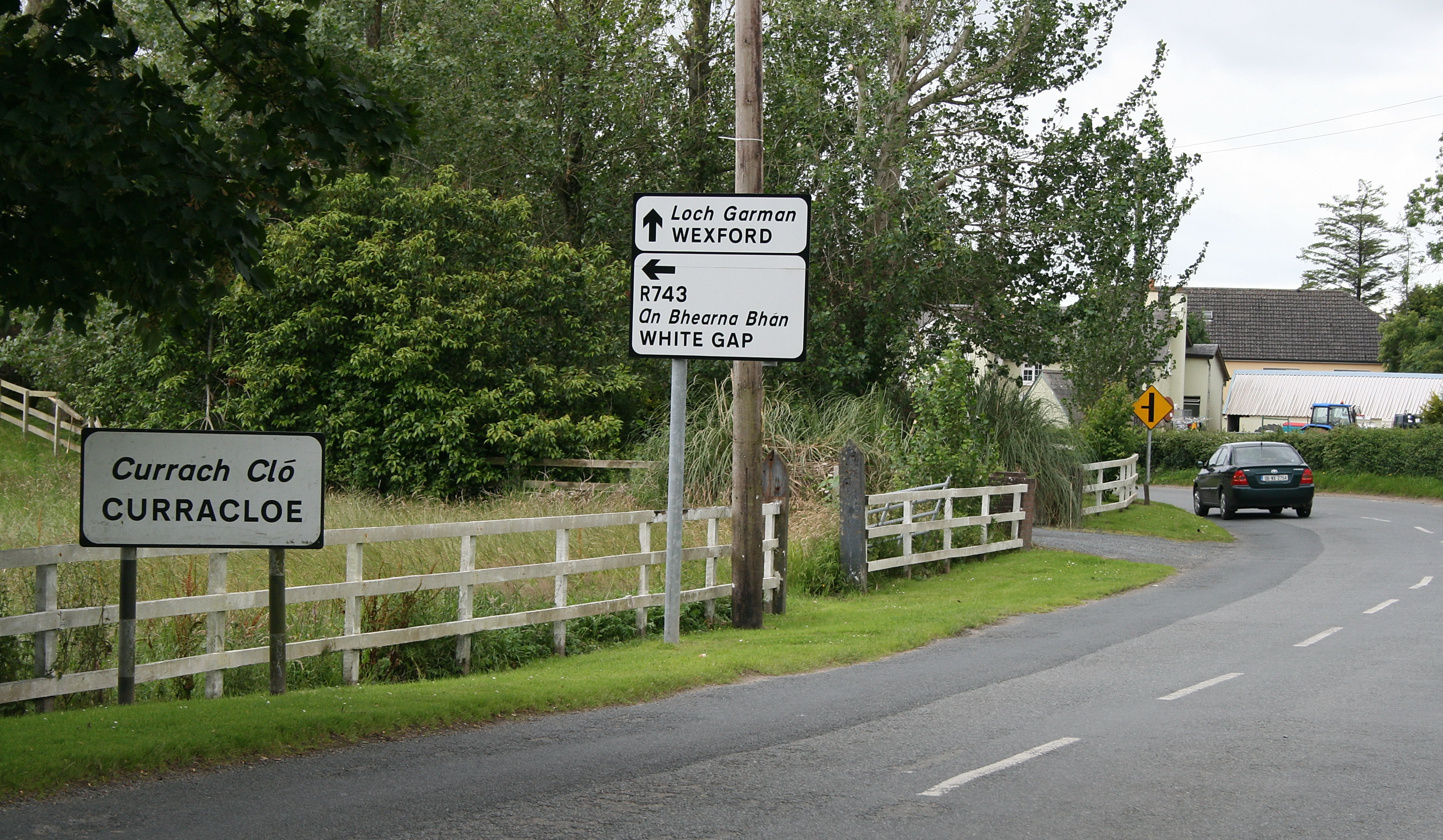
- Entering the village on the R742 road

- Location in Ireland
- Coordinates: 52°23′34.44″N 6°23′18.6″W
- Country: Ireland
- Province: Leinster
- County: Wexford
- Area code: 053

Curracloe (Irish: Currach Cló, meaning 'marsh of the impression') is a village in County Wexford, Ireland. Around 8 kilometres (5 mi) northeast of Wexford town, it is on the R742 road at the junction with the R743 road. It is linked to the long and sandy Curracloe Strand (beach) 4 km (2.5 mi) to the east. Curracloe sees an influx of holiday travellers every summer, who stay in bed & breakfast inns, mobile homes and caravan parks.

== Beach ==
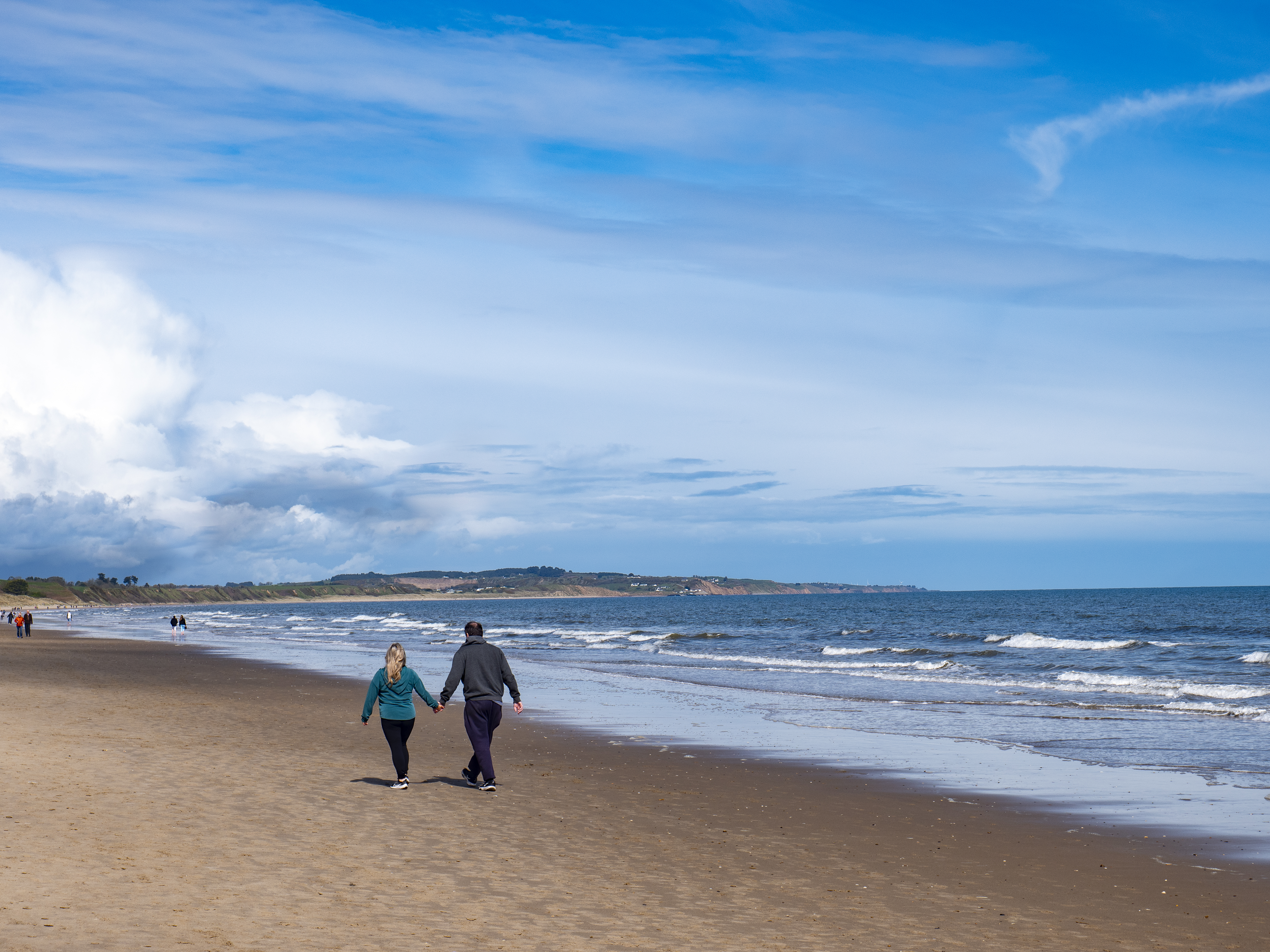
Curracloe Strand, County Wexford

Ballinesker Beach and Curracloe Strand, Ballinesker, were used for the filming of the D-Day sequence in Saving Private Ryan, due to similarity to Omaha Beach in Normandy. Filming began 27 June 1997, and lasted for two months. The village of Curracloe lacked three-phase electricity but when the film company decided to film there, it was connected. Curracloe Strand was also used for the Irish beach scene in the movie Brooklyn.

== See also ==
- List of towns and villages in Ireland
