= Irish Writers Union =

Representative body for authors in Ireland

- Aontas Scríbhneoirí Éireann
- Abbreviation: IWU
- Founded: January 1, 1987; 39 years ago
- Founded at: Guinness Brewery, St. James's Gate, Dublin
- Type: Representative association
- Headquarters: 19 Parnell Square, Dublin City, Ireland; Liberty Hall, Dublin City (formerly)
- Location: Ireland
- Chairperson: Lindsay J. Sedgwick (2023)
- Affiliations: SIPTU; European Writers' Council; Irish Writers' Centre; Irish Copyright Licensing Agency
- Website: irishwritersunion.org
- Formerly called: Comhar na Scribhneoirí

The Irish Writers Union (Irish: Aontas Scríbhneoirí Éireann), also known by its acronym, IWU, and formerly known as Comhar na Scribhneoirí, is a representative association devoted to furthering the professional interests and needs of writers in various media in Ireland. It is based in the building of the Irish Writers Centre (which it co-founded), in the centre of Dublin. The IWU is a member of the European Writers' Council (EWC), which itself is the largest federation worldwide that solely represents writers. The Irish Writers Union became an affiliate of the trade union SIPTU in 1993, but retained complete autonomy in the running of its own affairs. It is the only nominating body in Ireland for the Nobel Prize for Literature. The IWU is also a nominating body for the Astrid Lindgren Memorial Award. The Irish Copyright Licensing Agency (ICLA) also works with the IWU.

== Membership and meetings ==
Full membership of the IWU is open to those who have had a novel, non-fiction book or volume of poetry published in print, a play performed publicly, or any equivalent achievement in the literary arts; associate membership is open to others ("established, struggling or forever hopeful") who satisfy the Union's governing committee that they are actively engaged in writing. For e-book authors, including those who are self-published, there is a sales value threshold for full membership, with other eligible for associate membership.

The National Executive Committee of the Union meets monthly throughout the majority of the year at 19 Parnell Square, Dublin City, and an AGM open to all members takes place annually in the same premises, usually in March.

=== Notable members ===
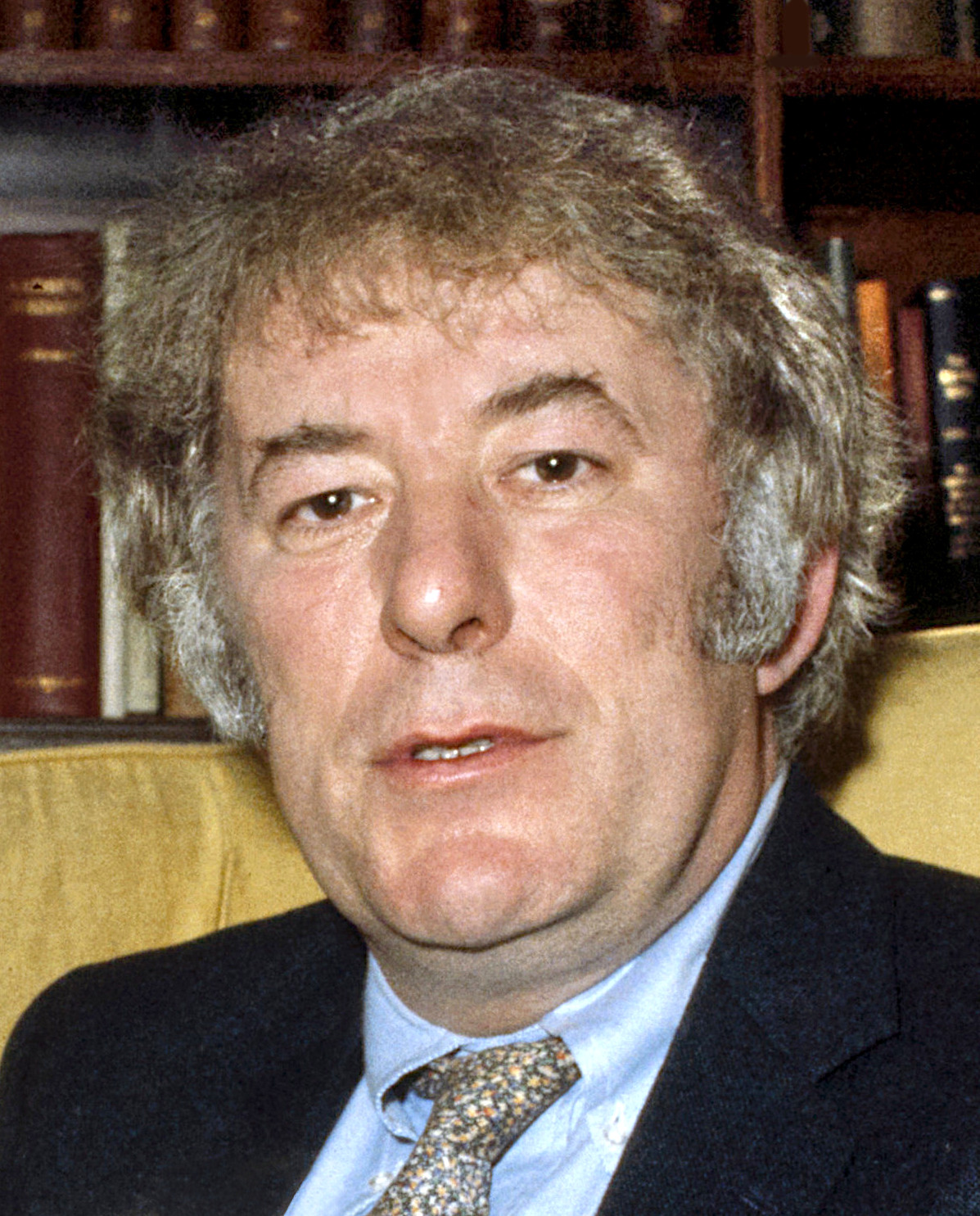
Notable members have included Brian Friel and Seamus Heaney

The association has a category or 'honorary life members', and holders of this status, past and present, include Michael D Higgins, William Trevor, Robert Greacen, Liam Mac Uistin, Benedict Kiely and Sam McAughtry.

In the early 1990s, following her relocation to County Cork, Astride Ivaska became active in the Irish Writers Union. During this period, Eithne Strong and Gabriel Rosenstock were also involved in the organisation. Leland Bardwell, Seamus Deane, Brendan Lynch, Dave Duggan, Mary O'Donnell, Margeretta D'Arcy, John Arden and Sebastian Barry were also involved in the Irish Writers Union at the turn of the 21st century. Sam McAughtry, as well as Fred Johnston, Anne Chambers, and the author and playwright Miriam Gallagher, also served on the executive committee. Other notable members included Ann Henning Jocelyn, Countess of Roden, Nuala Ní Dhomhnaill, and Frank Ryan. Richard Pine has served as honorary secretary. As per the organisation's website, the Irish novelist, Edna O'Brien, a member, was twice the IWU nominee for the Nobel Prize for Literature. According to an issue of the Irish Literary Supplement, the Irish Writers Union hosted an 80th birthday celebration in May 2000 at the James Joyce Centre for member James Plunkett.

Other notable members have included Catherine Dunne, Sally Rooney, Gerry Adams, Seamus Heaney, Benedict Kiely, John Montague, Thomas Kilroy, Val Mulkerns, Michael Hartnett and Brian Friel.

==== Chairpersons ====
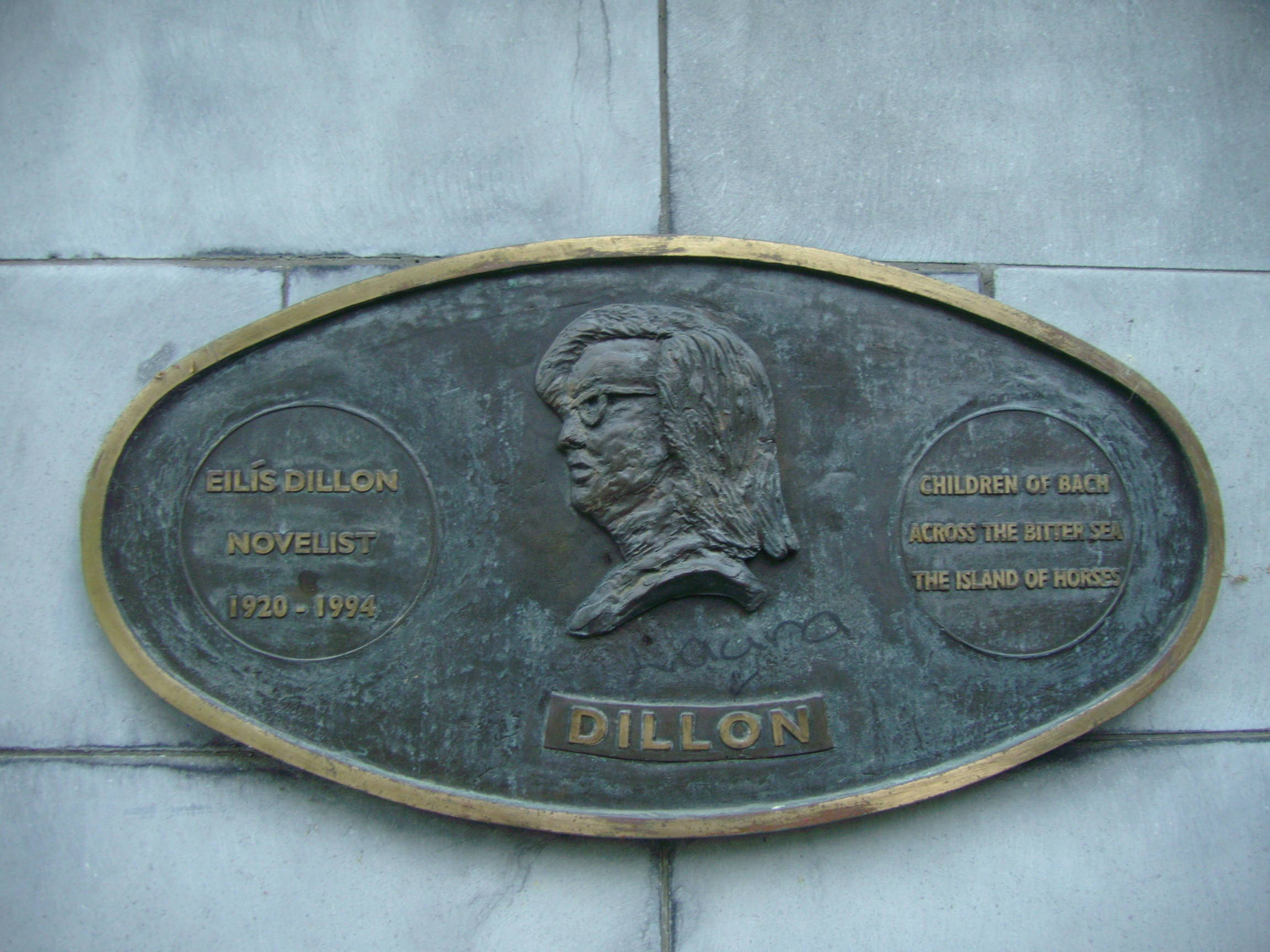
Eilís Dillon was a notable past chairperson of the association

The inaugural chairperson of the Irish Writers Union was Jack Harte. Among the former chairpersons of the IWU are the writer Eilís Dillon, who also was a niece of the poet and 1916 Easter Rising leader, Joseph Plunkett. Morgan Llywelyn, Helena Sheehan and Conor Kostick have also served as chairpersons of the Irish Writers Union. Additional individuals to have served as chairpersons include Anthony P. Quinn, known as the author of Credit Unions in Ireland, and Wigs and Guns: Irish Barristers in the Great War, as well as Anthony Roche, author of Bearing Witness: Essays on Anglo-Irish Literature. The screenwriter, playwright, and children's author, Lindsay J. Sedgwick, was serving as chairperson by 2023.

== History ==
=== Foundation ===
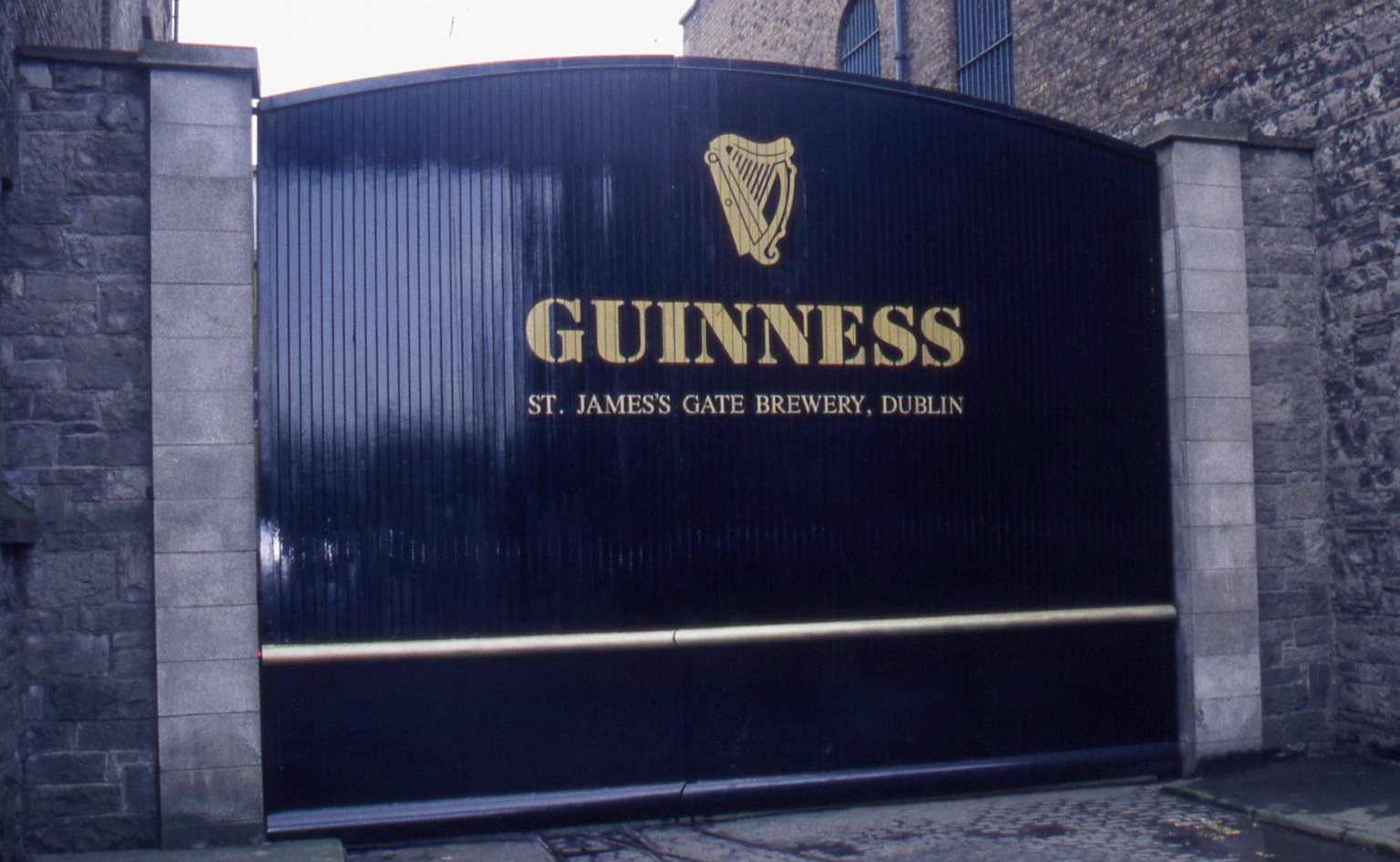
The IWU was launched at a meeting held in the Guinness Brewery, Dublin

The foundations for the Irish Writers Union were laid in 1985 when Jack Harte, at that time principal of Lucan Vocational School, County Dublin, set up a writers' advisory office, availing of the Social Employment Scheme. Harte employed a secretary and two workers in this office, one of whom, Joe Jackson, went on to become Ireland's first Writer-in-Residence. From the outset, the aim of the project Harte had in mind was to establish a writers' union and a centre for Irish writers. Employing the poet Padraig MacGrane to collect names of writers, Harte obtained the names and contact details which were used, in the summer of 1986, to distribute letters that outlined the plans and objectives of the proposed union and asking the recipients if they were interested in joining. Most of those contacted expressed an interest.

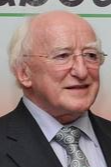
Michael D. Higgins, a TD and future President of Ireland, was involved in the establishment of the IWU.

In the autumn of 1986, approximately 120 members-to-be met up in Buswell's Hotel, Kildare Street, Dublin City, to draft the constitution of a writers' union. Over a three-hour meeting, a 65-clause constitution was arrived at. The Irish Writers Union was launched on 15 December 1987 at the Guinness Brewery in Dublin, with its constitution already in effect as of 1 January 1987. Harte was its first chairperson, a post he was to retain for three years. At the time of its foundation, the Irish Press wrote that "the Irish Writers Union, which aims to establish creative writing as a working profession, will negotiate on behalf of members for better contracts, better working conditions and more pay". Several founder members of the union were also members of Aosdána; one founder member was Philip Casey.

Figures such as Celia de Freine, Liz MacManus, Eilis Ní Dhuibhne, Sam McAughtry and Michael D. Higgins assisted in the establishment of the Irish Writers Union. In the 1990s, the organisation was also known as Comhar na Scribhneoirí.

=== Campaign issues ===
==== Contracts ====
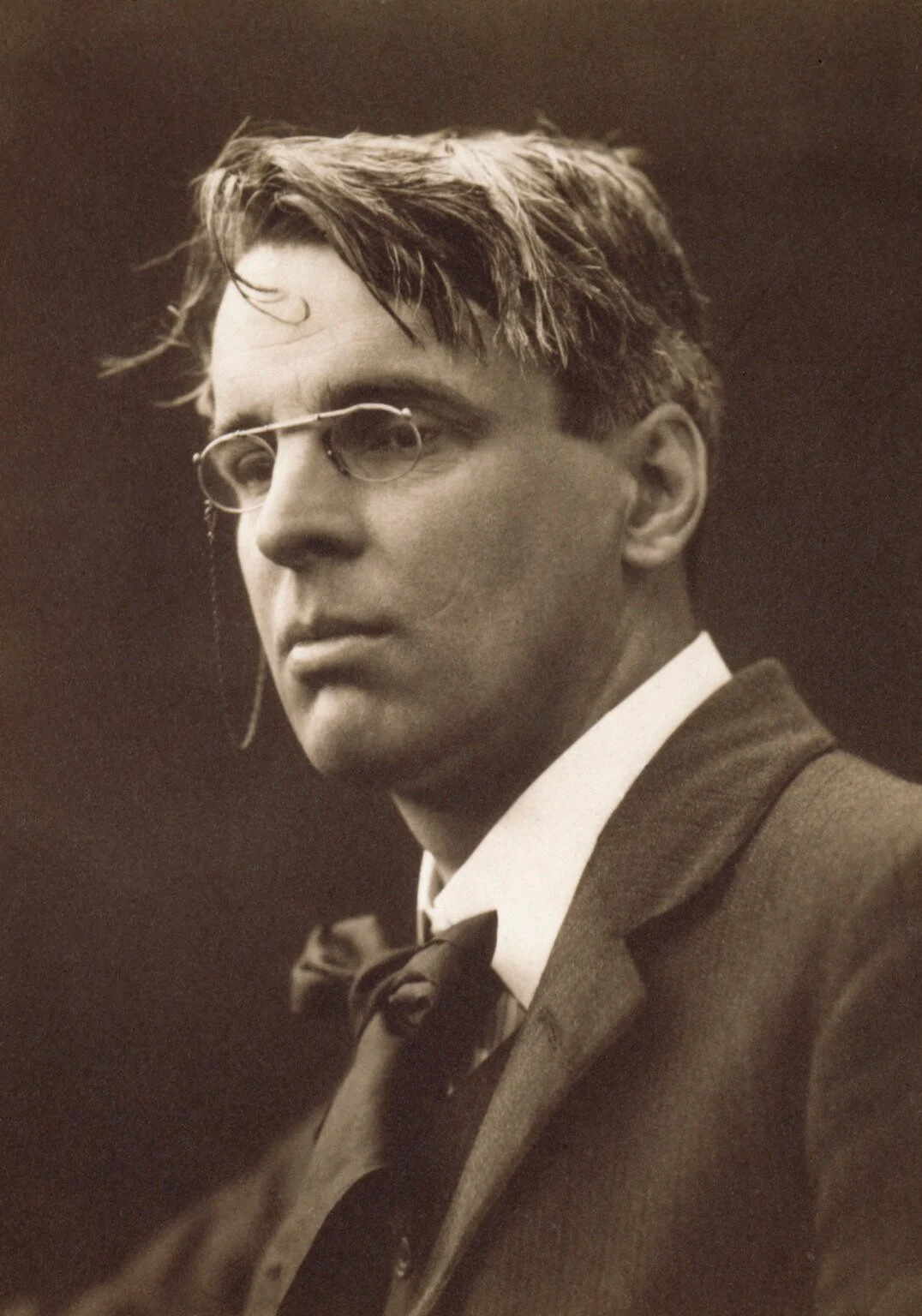
The IWU lobbied the Irish Government on behalf of the family of W.B. Yeats to change the law regarding royalties

Among the issues facing the union was the question of the practical management of authors' rights, and the relative positions of authors and publishers. From its early years, the IWU supported the idea of a model contract for writers and advised authors in this regard, helping writers negotiate their contracts with publishers. To this day, this service remains central to the activities of the Union. There was a lack of clarity around copyright in Ireland in the 1980s, and in part due to the efforts of the Irish Writers Union, the situation was clarified in keeping with international best practice.

In 1989, the Irish Writers Union called for the Government to change the law which allowed publishers to sell works over fifty years old without needing to pay 10-20% in royalties to their creators. The union asserted that this provision discriminated heavily against writers. This arose following the public revelation that the family of W. B. Yeats was to be deprived of all copyright and royalty fees for his works due to this provision.

According to The World Encyclopedia of Contemporary Theatre, as of 1994, the Society of Irish Playwrights agreed royalty rates in conjunction with the Irish Writers' Union.

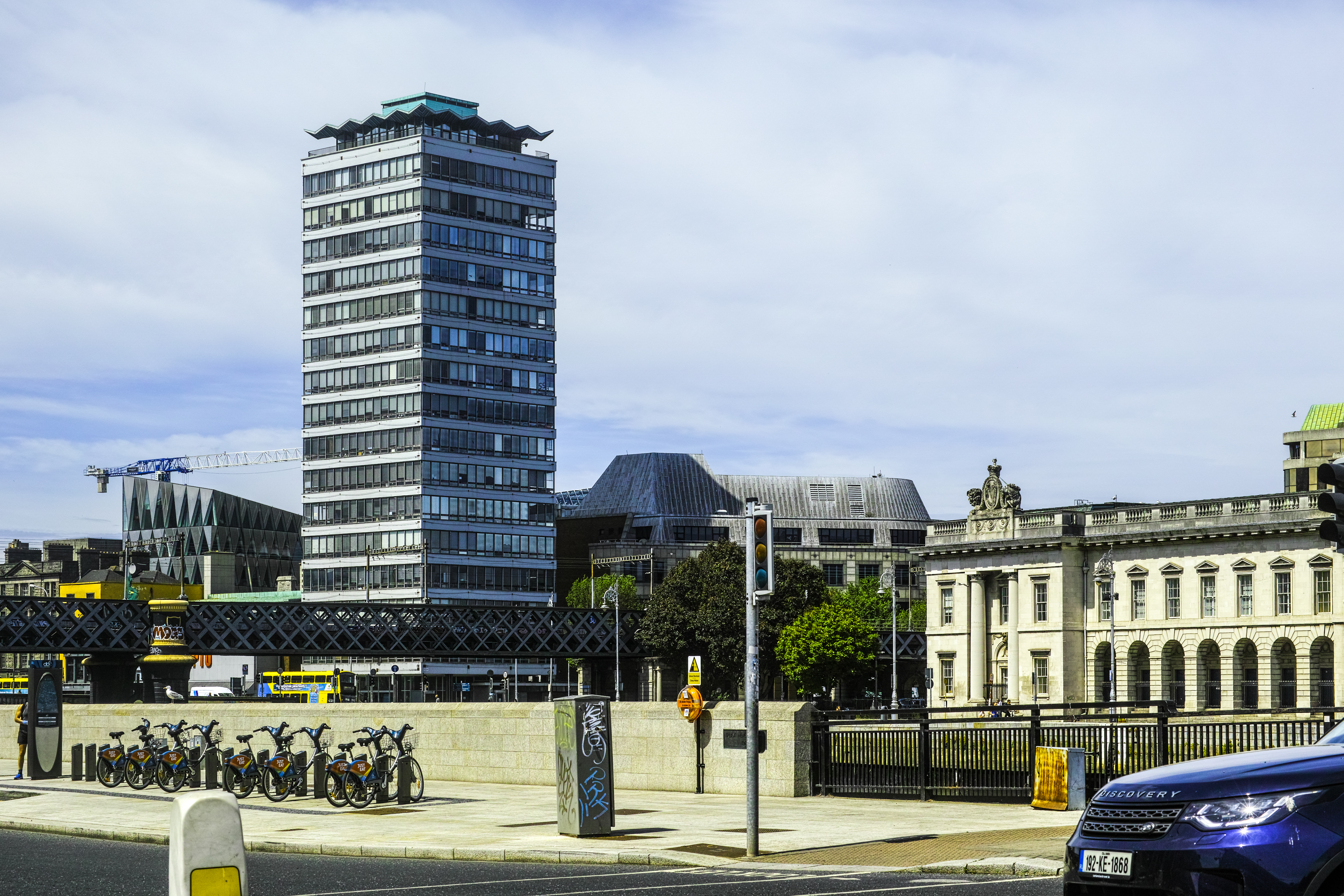
The IWU's address was given as Liberty Hall, Dublin City, in the late 1980s

==== Censorship ====
At the 8th European Writers Congress, held in Madrid, Spain during May 1987, the Irish Writers Union and the Society of Irish Playwrights jointly proposed a motion, which passed unanimously. The motion declared "this Congress condemns all forms of artistic censorship, and urges all governments to rescind any legislation which infringes the right to freedom of artistic expression". The IWU's office at this time is described as being located at the Irish Transport & General Workers Union (IT&GWU) headquarters at Liberty Hall, Dublin 1.

In 1989, the Irish Writers Union accused sections of the Muslim community in Ireland of "hysteria" in their reaction to the publication of the controversial novel 'The Satanic Verses'. Representatives from the IWU criticised the group for attempting to have the novel banned in Ireland. They were joined by Steve McDonagh, then president of the Irish Publishers Association (known as Clé) in supporting the novel's author, fiction writer Sir Ahmed Salman Rushdie, as well as bookshops, against physical intimidation.

The censorious attitude of the Irish state towards a wide variety of publications and movies was a very restrictive one through much of the mid-twentieth century; many books now considered central to Ireland's literary heritage, such as James Joyce's Ulysses, were banned from sale or distribution in Ireland. Although Brian Lenihan Snr introduced the Censorship of Publications Act, 1967 whereby the previously permanent ban on a given work was replaced by a twelve-year ban (and later a five-year ban), this did little to assist the distribution of short-lived works.

In the 1980s, a new Censorship of Publications Board composed of a body of retired judges started banning books afresh, among them works by Angela Carter; Alex Comfort's 'The Joy of Sex'; and various academic volumes dealing with erotic Classical art. The ban was upheld against the protests of the Irish Writers Union. A member of the Senior Council offered to take up the Union's cause on a pro bono basis, on the grounds that the Board were interfering with the legitimate rights of authors to earn a living. The poet and IWU member Robert Greacen had known Alex Comfort from their days as medical students in Dublin and put Jack Harte in touch with Comfort. On the grounds of performing a reading from his poetry, Comfort felt able to accept an invitation to appear at Buswell's Hotel, an event at which Comfort's views as a medical doctor and scientist on the importance of being able to write about sexual matters were aired. Such acts as these chipped away at the authority of the Censorship Board and when its five-year ban expired, 'The Joy of Sex' duly appeared on Irish bookshop shelves.

The Irish Writers’ Union also sought the cessation of what it termed the "covert action" and "arbitrary and clandestine procedures" employed by the Censorship Board. It highlighted the Censorship Board's lack of public accountability, its secretive operations, and its absence of obligation to openly justify the banning of a work or the process by which a work was identified. The Writers' Union advocated for fresh laws for censorship to be administered via the judicial system, instead of a technical committee, so granting authors and publishers the opportunity to an open forum.

=== 1980s to 1990s ===
Richard Pine served as honorary secretary of the Irish Writers Union from 1988 to 1990.

In 1991, only eight days following the release of 'Field Day Anthology,' by Seamus Deane, strong complaints to the anthology's absence of numerous women authors, and of essential works of Irish feminism, were raised by Nuala O'Faolain in an interview with Deane on the RTÉ television show 'Bookline.' After a span of three months, the Irish Writers' Union arranged a public discussion to discuss these concerns. However, Deane sent a late message stating his inability to participate. Eavan Boland, on the other hand, was in attendance, and she explicitly opined that she was "sorry to be included in an anthology which excludes women." Helena Sheehan would later remark that the "Field Day debate" was not solely about those who were not included in the anthology, because, she said, it truly reflected certain tensions. She noted that the Irish Writers Union "played a significant role" in that, of which she was very proud. She highlighted nonetheless that there was "sympathy" for Seamus Deane and Declan Kiberd, and that "it was never intended to undermine their reputations, or anything of that nature".

In 1993, the Irish Writers Union affiliated to the trade union SIPTU, but maintained absolute independence in its internal operations.

=== Acquiring a home base - The Irish Writers' Centre ===
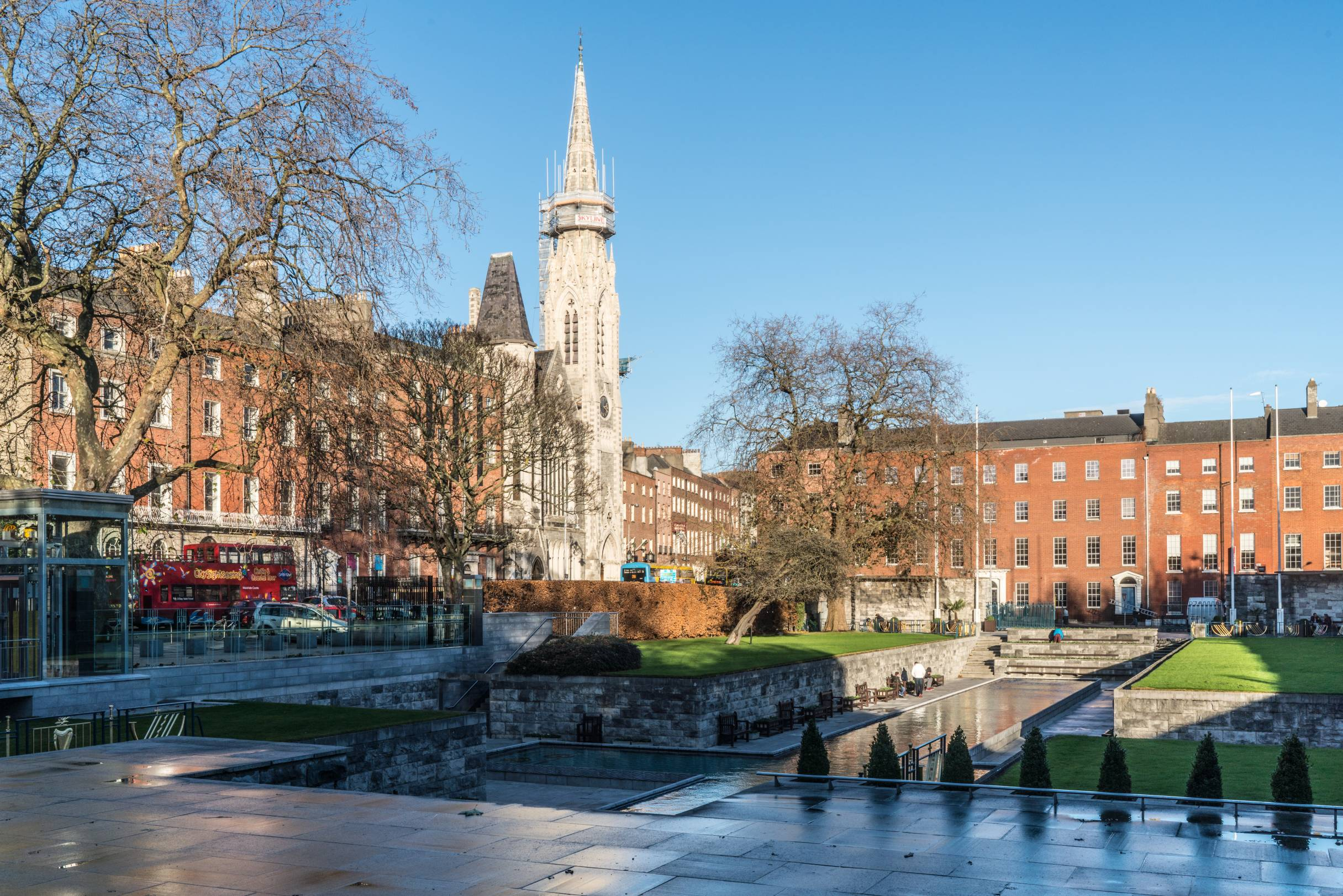
The IWU is now based at the Irish Writers Centre (which it founded) in Parnell Square, Dublin City, following its establishment in the 1990s.

From 1987 onwards, Taoiseach Charles Haughey appointed writer Anthony Cronin as his advisor for Arts policy. Although Cronin had no money to finance a centre for the Union either personally or in his political capacity, Harte presented him with a suggestion for a Writers' Centre. A large number of old Georgian houses were falling into disuse in the inner suburbs of Dublin; Harte suggested that Cronin petition that one of these be set aside as a centre for supporting and promoting Irish authors. Harte had heard about the Writers' Museum, directed by Matt McNulty; he went to McNulty asking about the possibility of establishing a writers' centre. McNulty provided premises for this purpose at 19 Parnell Square. The Irish Writers Centre was founded in 1991, it is Ireland's national resource centre for writers. The Writers Centre was intended initially as a general Arts Centre. All related writers' support groups were directly involved and represented at this address, including those working with playwrights, children's writers and translators. Since then, there has been some dispersal of these roles, with playwrights (represented by the Irish Playwrights and Screenwriters Guild), for instance, being based at the Irish Film Institute on Eustace Street in Temple Bar. The renovation of the premises on Parnell Square was funded by an IR£100,000 grant from the Irish Lottery. As of 2016, ambassadors for the Irish Writers' Centre included John Banville, Anne Enright, Michael D. Higgins, Roy Foster, Marian Keyes, Eilis Ni Dhuibhne and Joseph O’Connor.

=== Support for authors ===
In 2000, then Minister of State, Tom Kitt, declared that the Irish Copyright Licensing Agency (ICLA) possessed concerns regarding Section 166 of the Copyright and Related Rights Bill, 1999, which dealt with the certification of licensing schemes. Kitt stated in an Oireachtas debate that "the ICLA is concerned it may not be capable of being certified as it may not, in its opinion, be able to satisfy the requirements contained in section 166(2)(a), that is, that the works to which its licences refer can be identified with sufficient particularity. This is because, as far as authors are concerned, the authorisation to collect and administer royalties on behalf of its rights holders is obtained through the Irish Writers’ Union and not directly from individual authors. Some authors are not members of the Irish Writers’ Union and, in many cases, ICLA is granting licences and receiving royalties for the use of works without the specific authorisation of the rights holder."

Following the revelation that eleven people who had earned over €1 million in 2001 paid no tax on these earnings as beneficiaries of the controversial tax exemption scheme for artists, the incumbent Government of the period promised a review. However, the Irish Writers Union asserted in a submission that the majority of writers and artists "earning a pittance" depended on the scheme. According to Peter McKimm, then chairperson of the IWU, the tax exemption primarily supported and motivated novice writers to maintain their professional trajectories. The IWU emphasises in their submission to the government that a writer's formative years are typically devoted to writing, followed by obtaining an initial publication followed by additional work with the expectation of publication. They declared to then Minister for Finance, Brian Cowen, that “this period requires an enormous investment of a writer’s time over many years, with very little or no income being generated from writing. Even for the successful writer, income is frequently sporadic, with many intervening lean years". In addition, they emphasised that the "fragility" inherent in the art of writing could not be accounted for in a "number-crunching exercise". Cowen capped earnings nonetheless.

In 2003, the then chairperson of the IWU, Conor Kostick, a historian based at Trinity College, Dublin (TCD), founded the 'Writers Against the War' campaign in response to the outbreak of the Iraq War. In 2004, the Irish Writers Union launched the Jim Plunkett Memorial Award, with prize money being funded by the Irish Copyright Licensing Agency (ICLA). Former Northern Ireland based broadcaster and Senator, Sam McAughtry, was the subject of a feature documentary on BBC Northern Ireland in 2006, which referenced his approximately twenty year long involvement in the Irish Writers Union.

=== Public Lending Right campaign ===
From 1995, the Irish Writers Union campaigned for the introduction of a Public Lending Rights (PLR) scheme in Ireland. Morgan Llewelyn, then chairperson of the Irish Writers' Union, said that she was taken aback by the government's early reaction, allegedly stalling action. However, she stressed that Irish authors were not seeking a substantial financial reward. A spokesperson from the Department of Arts, Culture, and the Gaeltacht had acknowledged the department's particular concern for authors' rights, but chose to withhold their opinion on the topic until it was presented to the Cabinet for consideration.

The Union continued to lobby throughout the early years of the twenty-first century for a Public Lending Rights scheme, in this the IWU worked closely with the European Writers Congress (EWC) and the Irish Copyright Licensing Agency (ICLA). Such a scheme came into effect with the Copyright Bill 2007, on 28 November 2007 after the European Commission had taken legal action against Ireland in the European Court of Justice for failure to implement a PLR system. It declared that Ireland breached the Lending Rights Directive 1992 by exempting all public libraries from PLR in the Copyright and Related Rights Act, 2000. One of the central concerns for the IWU was that funding of Irish PLR came directly from the Exchequer and not from public libraries' budgets and the IWU welcomed the fact that the scheme was in fact introduced on this basis. At the Report and Final Stages debate of the Copyright and Related Rights (Amendment) Bill, 2007, then Senator Alex White opined that "the Minister of State (Michael Ahern) has not, however, dealt with the possibility of a limbo situation arising. The only reassurance he offers the House is that he thinks it unlikely that authors would seek to exercise a right in the interregnum. I have no doubt he has been in touch with the Irish Writers Union but no organisation can bind every writer to a particular agreement".

=== 2010s ===
In 2012, President of Ireland, Michael D. Higgins, attended the 25th anniversary celebrations of the Union.

The Irish Writers Union was involved in the international 'Fairer Contracts' campaign in 2016. The campaign was officially established when the Society of Authors, with the assistance of ALCS and other organisations, sent a formal open letter to publishers as part of a global collaborative effort to address creative contracts. The communication, which was sent to members of the Publishers' Association and the Independent Publishers' Guild, urged publishers to adhere to the principles of C.R.E.A.T.O.R, a set of guidelines involving seven crucial aspects aimed at ensuring balanced agreements. These components included transparency, equitable compensation, and reversion conditions that enabled writers to fully use their literary creations. The message also discussed the alleged disparity in the handling of writers who have literary representatives and those who do not. The International Authors Forum presented the '10 Principles for Fair Contracts' document to align with the letter.

According to Europa in Versi, Helen Soraghan Dwyer was chairperson of the Irish Writers Union in 2017.

In 2018, the UK based, Society of Authors, and the Irish Writers Union released a joint statement, in which they opposed a 'no deal' Brexit scenario. The joint statement placed emphasis on what was regarded as a historically intimate relationship between the British and Irish literary communities, in particular, referencing the notion that there exists an "enduring popularity of Irish writers in the U.K. and vice versa", and that the two industries are "inextricably aligned".

In October 2019, the Irish Writers Union made a submission to the Department of Business, Enterprise and Innovation on the transposition of EU Directive 2019/790 into Irish law. It also commended the passage of this Directive on copyright and related rights in the Digital Single Market.

=== 2020s ===
Amid the COVID-19 crisis in 2020, Irish libraries, publishers, and authors reached an agreement to coordinate a number of 'virtual storytimes' in response to the closure of libraries. Educators throughout Ireland live-streamed or uploaded storytime activities on social media platforms, ensuring that the recordings continued to be accessible online after the closure of libraries. As part of their yearly 'Spring into Storytime' promotion, libraries included it to showcase the creations of Irish writers and promote family reading. An agreement was reached between a consortium of Irish publishers and the Irish Writers Union to fortuitously dismiss licencing payments for the internet-based reading of certain works. Lissa Oliver, then chair of the Irish Writers Union, commented on the ongoing attempts to ensure that young people may be engaged while safeguarding the copyright of writers.

In 2021, the Union claimed that the average rate of €0.04 per borrowing from public libraries in Ireland was "too low" and that "it is approaching a level where the scheme in Ireland will be considered derisory and therefore in violation of the EU directive". According to The Times, the Irish Writers Union was critical of the fact that authors were remunerated a median of €32 for the borrowing of their works from local libraries in Ireland, as part of the government-funded programme. While eight writers earned the highest potential remuneration of €1,000, the remainder received compensation ranging from €10 to €50 for the public lending of their texts. Irish authors were allocated less than €21,700 out of the €200,000 limit, while British authors obtained the majority of the funds. In Britain, creators were able to earn nearly eight times the maximum set in Ireland, which amounted to £6,600 (€7,718). Additionally, the IWU criticised the perceived absence of advisory input from writers' organisations regarding the scheme's conception and execution. Nevertheless, it recognised that the Irish PLR scheme was, it believed, a comparatively equitable mechanism that did not excessively favour best-selling authors.

The Irish Writers Union was also a participant in the Minister Catherine Martin's Department of Tourism, Culture, Arts, Gaeltacht, Sport and Media's Basic Income for the Arts (BIA) Stakeholder Forum, which occurred in December 2021. In 2022, the Irish Writers Union became a participating organisation in the Pilot Scheme for the BIA.

In a 2022 interview, the IWU was one of several organisations praised by Irish novelist, Gráinne Murphy, in its initiatives pertaining to supporting writers during the COVID-19 pandemic. In February 2023, the Irish Times reported that the Irish Writers’ Union had issued proposed pay scales to address low pay in the publishing industry.

In June 2023, the Irish Writers Union, along with the Screen Directors Guild, the Writers Guild of Ireland (WGI), Irish Equity and Screen Composers of Ireland, supported the 2023 Writers Guild of America strike, which delayed the production of several Hollywood movies. As of 2023, Lindsay J. Sedgwick was chair of the Irish Writers Union.

In September 2023, the Irish Writers Union and Fórsa participated in a counter-rally against a far-right group at libraries in Cork City, expressing support for library workers.

In January 2024, the Irish Writers Union released a statement, condemning the harm suffered by poets, journalists and writers in the ongoing Gaza war. It stated that "the 23,000 Palestinians reported killed in the war as of 11 January 2024, included 13 Palestinian poets and 68 journalists. These deaths were publicly reported because their names are known through the poets’ publications and through the journalists’ writing for news outlets".

RTÉ News reported in March 2025 that a review found that works by well-known Irish authors, including President Michael D. Higgins, Anne Enright, and Sally Rooney, appeared in a database allegedly used to train Meta's AI models, without permission. The database was linked to Library Genesis (LibGen), a long-standing shadow library holding millions of copyrighted books and research papers without authorisation. The Irish Writers’ Union chairperson said the situation had "profound implications" for Irish authors and the association sent a letter to its author members, encouraging them to submit formal complaints to Meta and providing a template requesting compensation for unauthorised use. Within a day, 53 authors reported a combined 325 instances of their work appearing in the database. The union also launched a petition addressed to Minister for AI and Digital Transformation Niamh Smyth, calling for government involvement and criticised global tech firms for engaging in "wholesale copyright infringement". Subsequently, Meta, in response to RTÉ inquiries, stated that it respected intellectual property rights and believed its use of such data complied with existing laws. In April 2025, a demonstration organised by the association, as part of its ‘Grand Theft Author’ campaign, was held outside Government buildings. The IWU delegation submitted a petition signed by 1,500 authors; according to BBC News and the Irish Independent, those present included Audrey Magee and Cecilia Ahern.

== Awards ==
The IWU presents the annual Irish Writers Union Poetry Award. It also awards bursaries, according to Writing.ie.

== Literary events and international affiliations ==
The Union is involved in literary events through the European Writers' Council, and maintains links with other literary bodies throughout Europe. Its members frequently take part in literary festivals in various European countries. The IWU is a nominating body for a number of prestigious international writing awards and is frequently called upon to provide judges for national and international writing competitions.

== Records ==
Documents relating to the Irish Writers' Union are stored in the archives of the National Library of Ireland.
