= R297 road (Ireland) =

Road in Ireland

R297 road
- Bóthar R297
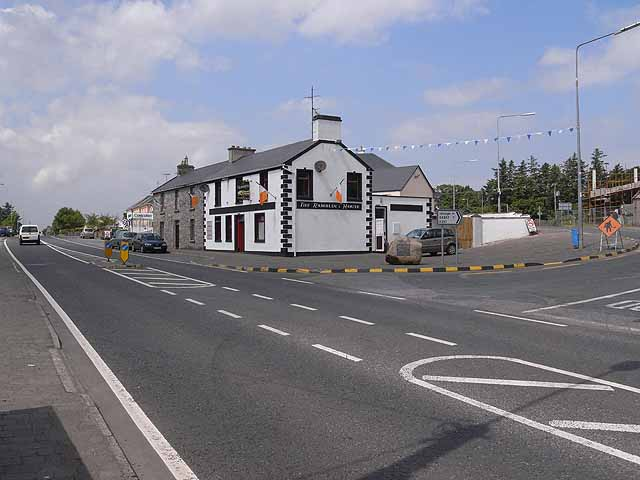
- Dromore West, where the R297 leaves the N59

Route information
- Length: 19.5 km (12.1 mi)

Location
- Country: Ireland
- Primary destinations: County Sligo; Dromore West (N59 road); Crosses the Ballymeeny River; Crosses the Easky River; Easky; Crosses the Finned River; Crosses the Cabragh River; Crosses the Leaffony River; R298 road; Inishcrone; Crosses the Bellawaddy River; Crosses the Devlin River; County Mayo; Dooyeaghny (N59 road)

Highway system
- Roads in Ireland; Motorways; Primary; Secondary; Regional

The R297 road is a regional road in counties Sligo and Mayo, in Ireland. It connects the N59 road near Dromore West to the N59 again at Dooyeaghny, just inside the Mayo border, 19.5 kilometres (12.1 mi) away (map).

The government legislation that defines the R297, the Roads Act 1993 (Classification of Regional Roads) Order 2012 (Statutory Instrument 54 of 2012), provides the following official description:

Dromore West, County Sligo — Dooyeaghny, County Mayo

Between its junction with N59 road at Dromore West in the county of Sligo and its junction with N59 road at Dooyeaghny in the county of Mayo via Easky, Rathlee, Kilglass, Cloonaderavally, Inishcrone and Bunnanilra in the county of Sligo.

== See also ==
- List of roads of County Mayo
- National primary road
- National secondary road
- Regional road
- Roads in Ireland
