= Tim Pollard =

English actor and entertainer (1964–2025)

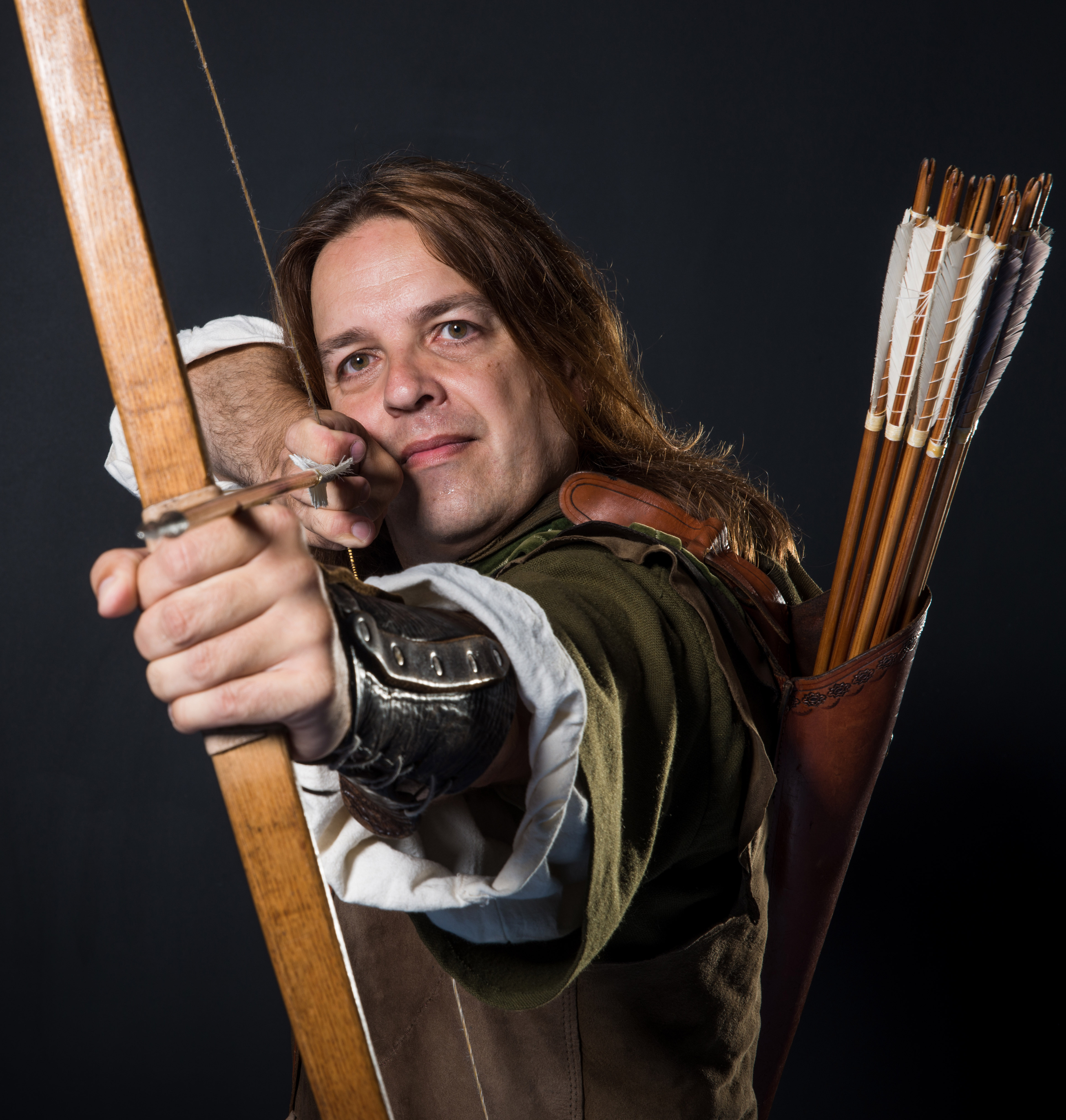
- Tim Pollard, the City of Nottingham's Official Robin Hood in 2013
- Born: 23 February 1964
- Died: 27 June 2025 (aged 61); Nottingham, England
- Occupation(s): Actor, entertainer
- Years active: 1985–2025
- Known for: Robin Hood in the Robin Hood Pageant at Nottingham Castle (1999–2025); TV appearances Blind Date, Moll Flanders, Common As Muck, The Big Breakfast
- Height: 6 ft 1 in (185 cm)

Tim Pollard (23 February 1964 – 27 June 2025) was an English actor and entertainer who appeared and performed as Robin Hood in and around his home town of Nottingham, England. He lived and worked in the city as well as representing it nationally and internationally in his position as Nottingham's Official Robin Hood.

== Early years ==
Before his career as an actor, Pollard worked in the roleplaying and wargaming industry for many years as well as being a freelance graphic designer and illustrator. During this time, he became involved in Viking battle re-enactments and the first live-roleplaying company established in the UK, Treasure Trap (at Peckforton Castle in Cheshire), as well as performing with a number of local rock bands. He also studied medieval Japanese and 19th-century South African history at SOAS, the prestigious School of Oriental and African Studies in London.

== Robin Hood ==
As Nottingham's Official Robin Hood, Pollard represented the County and City of Nottingham nationally and internationally from 1996 – for example appearing in Chicago, Houston, Toronto and several times in New York City and Hamelin, Germany (home of the infamous Pied Piper with whom he kept in contact through their brotherhood Legion of Legends). He also performed regularly at Nottingham Castle's annual Robin Hood pageant and at medieval banquets, charity events and other shows throughout the Midlands.

== Television ==
Pollard also choreographed fight scenes or played roles in Blue Peter, The Oxford Road Show, Blind Date, The Big Breakfast, Moll Flanders and Common As Muck. He appeared regularly on local television news and also appeared as Robin Hood on television shows such as Australia's Channel 9 Getaway travel show, Castles, Secrets and Legends for the U.S. Travel Channel and the BBC's Antiques Roadtrip.

In his role as Official Robin Hood of Nottinghamshire, he appeared as an expert in local history on the Travel Channel television show Expedition Unknown Season 2 episode "The Real Robin Hood".

== Film ==
Pollard appeared as the narrator character 'Lord Victor Fleming' in the horror films Dracula's Orgy of the Damned and Werewolf Massacre at Hell's Gate. Fleming was an expert in occult lore and a collector of tales of eldritch curiosity.

== DVD/Music ==
In 1985, he was a featured part of the stage show performing with psychedelic progressive rock band Hawkwind on their Chronicle of the Black Sword tour and can be seen on the live concert DVD The Chronicle of the Black Sword.

== Gaming and role-playing ==
Pollard also worked full- and part-time in the gaming business beginning in 1978. He was also employed in design at Games Workshop and Citadel Miniatures as a writer, editor, artist and art manager. He edited and produced the initial Flintloque line of table-top Napoleonic fantasy games for Alternative Armies, as well as co-writing the entry for Shaka Zulu in Steve Jackson Games GURPS Who's Who. He also contributed research on antique coins to the PC first-person action game The Operative: No One Lives Forever.

== Death ==
Following a short battle with cancer, Pollard died in June 2025, at the age of 61.
