= Brendan Lynch =

Brendan Lynch may refer to:

- Brendan Lynch (Kerry Gaelic footballer) (born 1949), former Gaelic footballer with Kerry
- Brendan Lynch (Roscommon Gaelic footballer) (1923–2014), Irish Gaelic footballer
- Brendan Lynch (music producer), British music producer
- Brendan Lynch (writer) (born 1937), Irish former motor racing journalist and author
- Brendan Lynch (politician) (died 2018), Irish independent politician and Lord Mayor of Dublin
- Brendan Lynch, a contestant on the third series of The Great British Bake Off
