= R298 road (Ireland) =

Road in Ireland

R298 road
- Bóthar R298

Route information
- Length: 4.9 km (3.0 mi)

Major junctions
- From: R297 at Cloonaderavally, County Sligo
- To: N59 at Carrownurlar

Location
- Country: Ireland

Highway system
- Roads in Ireland; Motorways; Primary; Secondary; Regional

The R298 road is a regional road in Ireland linking the R297 road near Enniscrone with the N59, entirely in County Sligo. The R298 is 4.9 km (3.0 mi) long.

== See also ==
- Roads in Ireland
