= Conor Kostick =

Irish writer and historian

- Kostick in 2007
- Born: Conor Kostick; 26 June 1964 (age 62); Chester, Cheshire, England
- Citizenship: Irish
- Occupations: Writer, historian
- Writing career
- Genres: Fantasy, science fiction, LitRPG, children's literature
- Notable work: Epic

Conor Kostick (born 26 June 1964) is a historian and writer living in Dublin. He is the author of many works of history and fiction. A former chairperson of the Irish Writers Union and member of the board of the National Library of Ireland, he has won a number of awards.

== Early life ==
Kostick is the eldest of two boys born to teachers Gerrie and Marjorie Kostick in Chester, England. His father was Jewish-Irish, brought up in Dublin but having moved to the UK in the 1950s, where he became a physical education teacher, while his mother was a teacher of maths. One set of grandparents were Polish Jews, who moved to Ireland to escape pogroms. Kostick attended a local comprehensive school in Chester.

== Career ==
Conor Kostick was the editor of Socialist Worker in Ireland and a reviewer for the Journal of Music in Ireland.

A historian, he holds a doctorate, and has lectured and researched at Trinity College Dublin. He has been awarded research fellowships by the Irish Research Council and the University of Nottingham.

In August 2018, he was recruited by the UK's Ockham Publishing to lead a new imprint, Level Up publishing, with a remit to publish LitRPG.

=== Notable works ===
Epic, a LitRPG volume, was his first novel and was awarded a place on the International Board on Books for Young People Honours list for 2006 and on the Booklist Best Fantasy Books for Youth list for 2007. It sold more than 100,000 copies. The sequel to Epic is Saga, first published in Ireland late in 2006; Edda, published 5 years later, in 2011, completed the 'Avatar Chronicles' trilogy.

Conor Kostick was a designer for the UK's first live action role-playing game, Treasure Trap.

== Other roles ==
Kostick was twice chairperson of the Irish Writers Union. He was awarded the Farmleigh writer's residency for the summer of 2010. In 2015, Kostick was made chairperson of the Irish Copyright Licensing Agency.

He was President of the Irish Jury for the EU Prize for Literature in 2015, and in that year too he was appointed to the Board of the National Library of Ireland.

In 2018, the Kerala Literature Festival, India, chose to showcase Irish literature and Conor Kostick was one of seven Irish writers invited to participate. In 2019, Conor Kostick again was president of the Irish Jury of the EU Prize for Literature.

In May 2025, Conor Kostick was elected to the Board of the European Writer's Council.

== Nominations and awards ==
At their 2009 awards, the Reading Association of Ireland gave Kostick the Special Merit Award 'in recognition of his significant contribution to writing for children in Ireland.'

Kostick was a nominee for the Astrid Lindgren Memorial Award 2012 and 2013.

As a historian, Kostick's awards include a gold medal from Trinity College Dublin, first prize in the 2001 Dublinia Medieval Essay Competition; fellowships from the Irish Research Council and the University of Nottingham; a Marie Curie Career Integration Grant; and, in 2015, the British Academy's Rising Star Engagement Award.

A former winner of Manorcon (2000), now one of Europe's grand prix Diplomacy events, Conor Kostick was a member of the Irish team that won the Diplomacy National World Cup in 2012.

== Personal life ==
He is the brother of the playwright Gavin Kostick and a member of Independent Left.

== Publications ==
=== Fiction ===
==== The Avatar Chronicles ====
- Epic (O'Brien Press, 2004; Viking Children's Books, Spring 2007).
- Saga (O'Brien Press, 2009).
- Edda (O'Brien Press/Viking Children's Books, 2011).

==== Other books of fiction ====
- Move (O'Brien Press, 2008)
- The Book of Curses (O'Brien Press, 2007, Curses & Magic, 2013).
- The Book of Wishes (Curses & Magic, 2013).
- Eternal Voyager (Curses & Magic, 2015).
- Sinead, the Sword and the Stone (Curses & Magic, 2017)
- The Dragon's Revenge (Level Up, 2019).
- The Retreat (Red Stag, 2020).
- Clíona agus an Claíomh (Léigh Leat, 2023)

==== As Oisin Muldowney ====
- Summoned! To an RPG World (Curses & Magic, 2022).
- Summoned! To Grimworld (Curses & Magic, 2023).

=== Non-Fiction ===
==== History ====
- The Social Structure of the First Crusade (Brill, 2008).
- Revolution in Ireland (Cork University Press, 2009 [1996]).
- The Easter Rising, A Guide to Dublin in 1916 (Fifth Edition: O'Brien Press, 2009 [2000]), with Lorcan Collins.
- The Siege of Jerusalem (Continuum, 2009).
- Medieval Italy, Medieval and Early Modern Women – Essays in Honour of Christine Meek (Four Courts, 2010), editor.
- The Crusades and the Near East: Cultural Histories (Routledge, 2010), editor.
- Strongbow (O'Brien Press, 2013).
- Michael O'Hanrahan (O'Brien Press, 2015).
- Making the Medieval Relevant (De Gruyter, 2019), co-editor.
- Marxism and Medieval History (Curses & Magic, 2021).

==== On games ====
- The Art of Correspondence in the Game of Diplomacy (Curses & Magic, 2015).
- Inclusive Yard Games: With Rule Changes for Visually Impaired Players (Curses & Magic, 2020), co-author with Maya Kostick.

==== Other non-fiction books ====
- Irish Writers Against War (O'Brien Press, 2003), co-editor with Katherine Moore.
