= Killeenduff =

Townland in County Sligo, Ireland

Coordinates: 54°17′N 8°56′W

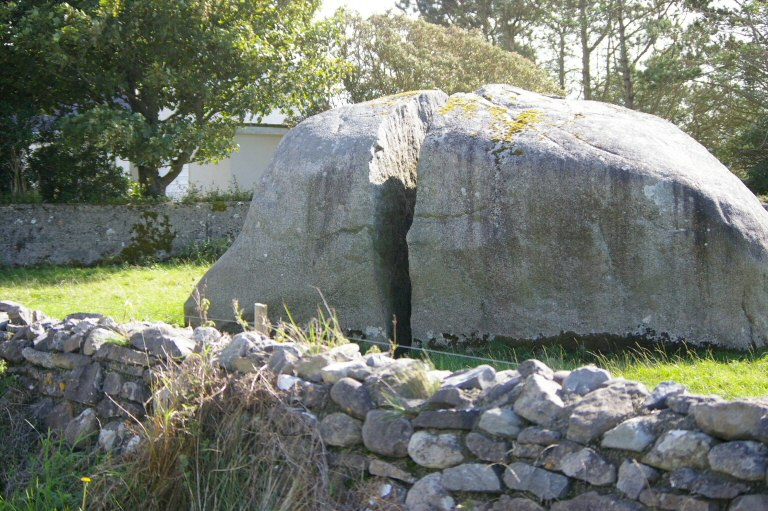
"Split Rock" at Killeenduff

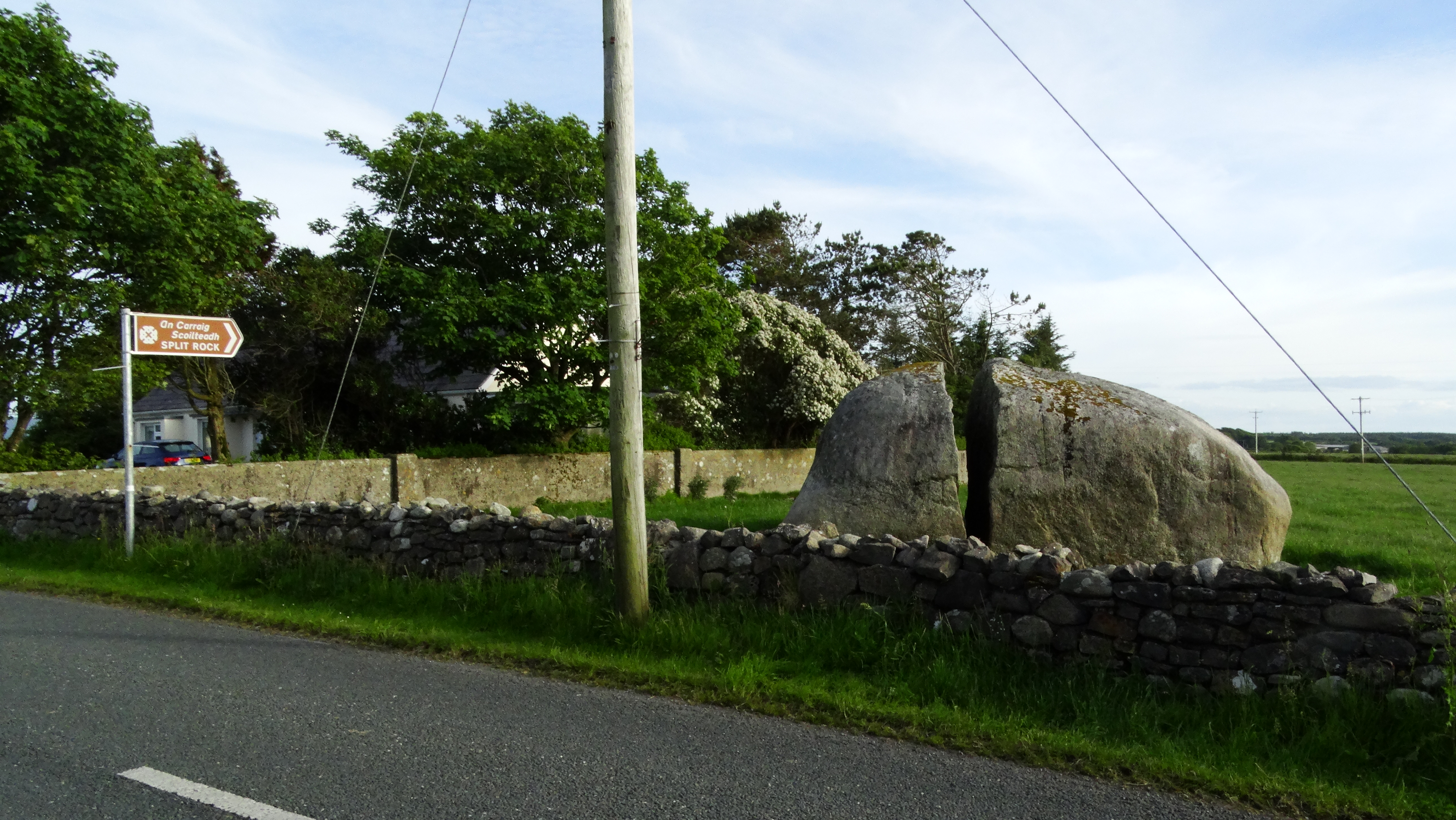
The rock alongside the R297 regional road

Killeenduff (Irish: An Cillín Dubh, meaning 'small black church') is a townland within the boundaries of the civil parish of Easky, County Sligo in Ireland. Located about a mile from the village of Easky, Killeenduff has an area of approximately 4 square kilometres (1.5 sq mi).

The townland is home to the "Split Rock". Local folklore holds that this rock —though actually carried to its current location by an Ice Age glacier— was split as a result of an argument between two giants. According to legend, if one walks through the split three times, it will close, entombing the person forever.

Killeenduff National School, built in 1965 and extended and refurbished in 2007, is located in the area.

== Notable people ==
- Jack Harte, writer, was born at Forge's Corner in Killeenduff, where his father was a blacksmith. Several of his short stories draw upon Killeenduff and its local mythology.
- Fred Conlon, sculptor, was born and grew up in Killeenduff.
