= 1979 Sligo Senior Football Championship =

Gaelic football competition

Sligo Senior Football Championship 1979
Tournament details
- County: Sligo
- Year: 1979

Winners
- Champions: St. Mary's (2nd win)

Promotion/Relegation
- Promoted team(s): Shamrock Gaels
- Relegated team(s): Curry

This is a round-up of the 1979 Sligo Senior Football Championship. The Championship had been reduced to eight teams for this year, following the introduction of the Intermediate grade. St. Mary's regained the title after a comfortable defeat of Tubbercurry in the final, and their dominance of Sligo club football was firmly set in motion.

== Quarter finals ==
Game	Date	Venue	Team A	Score	Team B	Score
Sligo SFC; Quarter Final	5 August	Easkey	St. Mary’s	0-9	Enniscrone	0-6
Sligo SFC; Quarter Final	5 August	Easkey	Tourlestrane	1-8	St. Patrick’s	1-8
Sligo SFC; Quarter Final	5 August	Markievicz Park	Tubbercurry	1-10	Eastern Harps	1-8
Sligo SFC; Quarter Final	5 August	Ballymote	Coolera	1-6	Curry	0-5
Sligo SFC; Quarter Final Replay	12 August	Markievicz Park	Tourlestrane	1-11	St. Patrick’s	3-3

== Semi-finals ==
Game	Date	Venue	Team A	Score	Team B	Score
Sligo SFC; Semi-Final	26 August	Markievicz Park	St. Mary’s	1-10	Coolera	0-8
Sligo SFC; Semi-Final	26 August	Ballymote	Tubbercurry	4-5	Tourlestrane	1-5

== Sligo Senior Football Championship Final ==
St. Mary's	0-13 - 1-4 (final score after 60 minutes)	Tubbercurry
Team: E. Eames; C. O'Donnell; J. McNamara; K. Delaney; T. Carroll; M. Barrett; J. McGowan; G. Monaghan; M. Laffey; E. McHale (0-1); B. Murphy (0-1); John Kent (0-6); E. Delahunt (0-2); Jim Kent (0-2); M. Walsh (0-1) Substitutes:	Half-time: Competition: Sligo Senior Football Championship (Final) Date: 9 September 1979 Venue: Kilcoyne Park, Tubbercurry Referee: Micheal Kearins (St. Patrick's)	Team: J. Gillespie; T. Staunton; G. Gilamrtin; P. Leonard; S. Gallagher; M. McCarrick; N. Faul (1-1); E. Gilmartin; S. Sherlock; P. Kilgallen; G. McCarrick (0-3); P. McIntyre; R. McCarrick; J. Murphy; J. Glynn Substitutes:
