= Carrowhubbock =

Carrowhubbock (from Irish Ceathrú Hobac Theas, meaning "Hobuck's quarter") may refer to the following places in the Republic of Ireland:

- Carrowhubbock North, a townland near Enniscrone, County Sligo
- Carrowhubbock South, a townland of Enniscrone, County Sligo
