= Fred Conlon =

Fred Conlon (1943–2005) was an Irish sculptor.

Born in Killeenduff, Easky, County Sligo, where he was schooled, Conlon won a five-year scholarship to the National College of Art and Design in 1960. Domhnail O'Murchadha, assistant professor of sculpture, encouraged him to complete a sculpture diploma. He then spent a year obtaining an Art Teachers Certificate and became a sculpture associate of the college, where he stayed until 1972 apart from eighteen months as art teacher in Navan Vocational School.

In 1972 Conlon returned to Sligo to teach at the Sligo Vocational School for a year before becoming a lecturer at the Sligo Regional Technical College (now Sligo Institute of Technology), where he helped to develop a diploma course in art. For the next sixteen years he lectured in sculpture and drawing there until his early retirement 1989.

He worked full-time as a professional sculptor until early 2004, when a brain tumour (Glioma) was diagnosed. Although some 80% of the tumour was removed, Conlon was physically incapacitated and required extensive care for the remaining year of his life. During that year he worked on a video installation entitled Become.

Conlon's works include Millennium Garden Sculpture at Lucan Community College. He worked in stone, creating large abstract forms.

He exhibited with Independent Artists, Oireachtas, the Royal Hibernian Academy and Sculpture in context.

Jack Harte has written an account of Conlon's life, Unravelling the Spiral - The Life and Work of Fred Conlon (1943–2005) (Scotus Press, Dublin, 2010). Harte and Conlon were born within fifty metres of one another, and ten months apart, in the townland of Killeenduff. They were cousins and close friends until Conlon's death. In this book Harte warmly tells the remarkable story of Conlon's life and provides a unique insight into his ideas and inspiration. Pursuing the sculptor's fascination with the spiral motif, Harte unravels the Neolithic symbolism of the Spiral and the Newgrange Monument to illustrate the subliminal pagan inspiration underneath Conlon's overtly Christian spiritual urges. The book is illustrated with photographs of Conlon's work.
