= International prize list of Diplomacy =

Tournaments for the Diplomacy board game have been conducted around the world for decades.

== The World Diplomacy Championship ==
During the 1970s, there were very few Diplomacy tournaments outside North America. At that time, the winner of the tournament held at American DipCon was considered by the North American players as a world champion of Diplomacy.

The World Diplomacy Convention (WorldDipCon or WDC) was created in 1988 and the winner of the tournament held at this convention ("The World Diplomacy Championship") is acknowledged as the World Diplomacy Champion (also called the WDC Champion).

The location of each WDC, with the players taking the top three places in the tournament held there, are listed below:

Year	Host city	Host country	World Champion	Second	Third
1988	Birmingham	Great Britain	(United Kingdom) Phil Day	(United Kingdom) Matt MacVeigh	(United Kingdom) Jim Mills
1990	Chapel Hill	United States	(United States) Jason Bergmann	(United States) Jeff Bohner	(United States) Steve Cooley
1992	Canberra	Australia	(Australia) Steve Gould	(Australia) Eric Roche	(France) Bruno-André Giraudon
1994	Birmingham	Great Britain	(France) Pascal Montagna	(France) Stéphane Gentric	(France) Bruno-André Giraudon
1995	Paris	France	(France) Bruno-André Giraudon	(France) (Portugal) Antonio Ribeiro da Silva	(France) Thomas Sebeyran
1996	Columbus	United States	(United States) Pitt Crandlemire	(Sweden) Leif Bergman	(Sweden) Björn von Knorring
1997	Gothenburg	Sweden	(France) Cyrille Sevin	(Sweden) Roger Edblom	(Norway) Borger Borgersen
1998	Chapel Hill	United States	(United States) Chris Martin	(United States) John Quarto-von-Tivadar	(United States) Mark Fassio
1999	Namur	Belgium	(Sweden) Christian Dreyer	(Sweden) Leif Bergman	(United Kingdom) Ivan Woodward
2000	Hunt Valley	United States	(United Kingdom) Simon Bouton	(Republic of Ireland) Brian Dennehy	(United States) Matthew Shields
2001	Paris	France	(France) Cyrille Sevin	(Republic of Ireland) Brian Dennehy	(United Kingdom) Chetan Radia
2002	Canberra	Australia	(Australia) Rob Stephenson	(New Zealand) Grant Steel	(France) Yann Clouet
2003	Denver	United States	(France) Vincent Carry	(United States) Edward Hawthorne	(Norway) Frank Johansen
2004	Birmingham	Great Britain	(France) Yann Clouet	(Netherlands) André Kooy	(France) Cyrille Sevin
2005	Washington	United States	(Norway) Frank Johansen	(United States) Tom Kobrin	(United States) Edi Birsan
2006	Berlin	Germany	(France) Nicolas Sahuguet	(France) Cyrille Sevin	(France) Yann Clouet
2007	Vancouver	Canada	(United States) Doug Moore	(United States) Jake Mannix	(United States) Mark Zoffel
2008	Lockenhaus	Austria	(Germany) Julian Ziesing	(France) Cyrille Sevin	(Germany) Daniel Leinich
2009	Columbus	United States	(Australia) Andrew Goff	(United Kingdom) Daniel Lester	(United States) Jim O'Kelley
2010	The Hague	Netherlands	(France) Gwen Maggi	(Germany) Igor Kurt	(France) Xavier Blanchot
2011	Sydney	Australia	(Australia) Andrew Goff	(New Zealand) Grant Steel	(Republic of Ireland) Liam Cosgrave
2012	Chicago	United States	(United States) Michael A. Binder	(United States) Don Scheifler	(United States) Matt Shields
2013	Paris	France	(France) Cyrille Sevin	(United Kingdom) Toby Harris	(France) Gwen Maggi
2014	Chapel Hill	United States	(United States) Thomas Haver	(United Kingdom) Daniel Lester	(Germany) Phil Weissert
2015	Milan	Italy	(United Kingdom) Toby Harris	(France) (Spain) Rubén Sanchez García Luengo de Madrid	(United States) Thomas Haver
2016	Chicago	United States	(Canada) (United Kingdom) Chris Brand	(United States) Doug Moore	(Australia) Andrew Goff
2017	Oxford	Great Britain	(United States) Doug Moore	(Austria) Marvin Fried	(Canada) Tanya Gill
2018	Washington	United States	(Australia) Andrew Goff	(United States) Doug Moore	(United States) Adam Sigal
2019	Marseille	France	(France) Gwen Maggi	(Australia) Andrew Goff	(Switzerland) Christophe Borgeat
2020	Event not held				
2021	Event not held				
2022	Dover	United States	(United Kingdom) Daniel Lester	(Australia) Peter McNamara	(United States) Peter Yeargin
2023	Bangkok	Thailand	(Australia) Jamal Blakkarly	(United States) Brandon Fogel	(Canada) (United Kingdom) Chris Brand
2024	Varedo	Italy	(Canada) (France) Nicolas Sahuguet	(Australia) Peter McNamara	(Germany) Fabian Straub
2025	San Francisco	United States	(United States) Noam Brown	(United States) Adam Sigal	(United States) David Hood
2026	Athens	Greece	(United Kingdom) (Greece) Mikalis Kamaritis	(United Kingdom) Daniel Lester	(Canada) (France) Nicolas Sahuguet
2027	Chicago	United States			
2028	Melbourne	Australia			

The 2020 event was originally scheduled for Dover, but was postponed due to the COVID-19 pandemic. Both the already-selected 2020 (Dover) and 2021 (Bangkok) events were pushed back two years.

== Virtual Face-to-Face ==
Online play with real-time voice negotiations, known as virtual face-to-face, became widespread in 2020, leading to three major annual competitions with global participation.

=== Virtual Diplomacy Championship (VDC) ===
The VDC is an open tournament held over a single weekend in December. Rounds are scheduled to be convenient to players around the world.

Year	Champion	Second	Third
2020	(United States) Morgante Pell	(France) (Canada) Nicolas Sahuguet	(United States) Bill Hackenbracht
2021	(France) (Canada) Nicolas Sahuguet	(United States) Farren Jane	(Canada) Liam Stokes
2022	(Canada) Riaz Virani	(United States) Jason Mastbaum	(United States) Johnny Gillam
2023	(Australia) Jamal Blakkarly	(Australia) Peter McNamara	(United Kingdom) (Greece) Mikalis Kamaritis
2024	(United States) Jaxon Roberts	(Australia) Jason Gray	(United States) Noam Brown
2025	(Netherlands) Maaike Blom	(United States) Katie Gray	(United Kingdom) (Greece) Mikalis Kamaritis & (Australia) Casey McAllister

=== Virtual Diplomacy League (VDL) ===
The VDL is an open league with monthly gamedays and rounds convenient to players around the world. The season culminates in a championship game held in January.

Year	Champion	Second	Third
2020	(Canada) Tanya Gill	(United States) John Anderson	(United States) Morgante Pell
2021	(France) Nicolas Taillet	(United States) Brandon Fogel	(United Kingdom) (Greece) Mikalis Kamaritis
2022	(United States) Brandon Fogel	(France) Nicolas Taillet	(United States) Timothy Crosby
2023	(United Kingdom) (Greece) Mikalis Kamaritis	(France) Nicolas Taillet	(United States) Matthew Totonchy
2024	(United States) Jordan Connors	(United States) Justin Loar	(United States) Matthew Totonchy
2025	(United Kingdom) Bradley Grace	(Australia) Jamal Blakkarly	(United States) Justin Loar

=== Diplomacy Broadcast Network Invitational (DBNI) ===
The DBNI is an invitational tournament held annually in February. Players earn invitations based on their performance at a wide variety of Diplomacy competitions over the previous year, including in-person face-to-face, virtual face-to-face, and extended deadline online play. The champion receives the title "DBN Diplomat of the Year".

Year	Diplomat of the Year	Runners-up
2021	(Australia) Peter McNamara	(United States) Matthew Crill (United States) Russ Dennis (United States) Andrei Gribakov (United States) Farren Jane (France) (Canada) Nicolas Sahuguet (United Kingdom) Markus Zijlstra
2022	(United States) Jason Mastbaum	(United States) Brandon Fogel (United States) Katie Gray (United States) Farren Jane (United Kingdom) Seren Kwok (United States) Ed Sullivan (France) Nicolas Taillet
2023	(United States) Brandon Fogel	(Canada) (United Kingdom) Chris Brand (United States) Noam Brown (Australia) Peter McNamara (France) (Canada) Nicolas Sahuguet (France) Ruben Sanchez (Canada) Riaz Virani
2024	(Australia) Peter McNamara	(United States) Johnny Gillam (United Kingdom) Seren Kwok (United States) (Mexico) Doug Malotte (United States) Ed Sullivan (United States) Matthew Totonchy (United Kingdom) Christopher Ward
2025	(United Kingdom) (Greece) Mikalis Kamaritis	(United States) Katie Gray (United Kingdom) Bradley Grace (Canada) Riaz Virani (United States) (Mexico) Doug Malotte (United States) Jordan Connors (Australia) Max Wanji Roe Banks
2026	(France) Nicolas Taillet	(Netherlands) Maaike Blom (United Kingdom) (Greece) Mikalis Kamaritis (Australia) Brandan Austin (Australia) Max Wanji Roe Banks (United States) Wes Ketchum (United States) Noam Brown

== Online Diplomacy Championship ==
Created in 2015, the Online Diplomacy Championship occurs once every two years, rotating between a number of Diplomacy websites. The winner is considered to be the World Champion of Online Diplomacy, a format in which phases are processed once every one or two days, and all correspondence is sent in written form via the host site. Players in online tournaments typically play under pseudonyms, and accept the title under these names.

The players taking the top three places in each ODC tournament are listed below.

Year	Host Website	Online Champion	Second	Third
2015	webDiplomacy	(United Kingdom) Octavious	(Canada) VillageIdiot	(Canada) Yonni
2017	PlayDiplomacy	(United States) Steve Cooley & (United Kingdom) Bravo Papa Alpha		(United States) Machiara
2019	webDiplomacy	(United Kingdom) Brumark	(United Kingdom) Teccles	(Australia) Napoleon of Oz
2022	PlayDiplomacy	(United States) RedCandle	(Scotland) Pootleflump	(Canada) Yonni

== North America ==
=== DipCon ===
The winner of the DipCon (Diplomacy Convention) tournament is the North American champion. The title of North American champion was not given at the beginning, but since 1972 has been awarded to each winner of the convention tournament. DipCon was created in 1966 and occurred each year (except in 1967 and 1968). There was no tournament in 1966, 1969 1971, and 2020.

The winner of each DipCon North American Championship tournament:

Year	Host city	Host country	North American Champion	Notes
1970	Oklahoma City	United States	(United States) John Smythe	
1972	Chicago	United States	(United States) Richard Ackerlay	
1973	Chicago	United States	(United States) Conrad von Metzke and (United States) John Smythe tie	
1974	Chicago	United States	(United States) Mike Rocamora	
1975	Chicago	United States	(United States) Walter Blank and (United States) Bob Wartenberg tie	
1976	Baltimore	United States	(United States) Thomas Reape	
1977	Lake Geneva	United States	(United States) Mike Rocamora	
1978	Los Angeles	United States	(United States) David Lagerson	
1979	Chester	United States	(United States) Ben Zablocki	
1980	Rochester	United States	(United States) Carl Eichelberger	
1981	Burlingame	United States	(United States) Ron Brown	
1982	Baltimore	United States	(United States) Konrad Baumeister	
1983	Detroit	United States	(United States) Joyce Singer	
1984	Dallas	United States	(United States) Jeff Key	
1985	Seattle	United States	(United States) J.R. Baker	
1986	Fredericksburg	United States	(United Kingdom) Malcolm Smith	
1987	Madison	United States	(United States) David Hood	
1988	San Antonio	United States	(United States) Dan Sellers	
1989	San Diego	United States	(United States) Edi Birsan	
1990	Chapel Hill	United States	(United States) Jason Bergmann	
1991	Scarborough	Canada	(United States) Gary Behnen	
1992	Lenexa	United States	(United States) Marc Peters	
1993	San Mateo	United States	(United States) Hohn Cho	
1994	Chapel Hill	United States	(United States) Bruce Reiff	
1995	Baltimore	United States	(Canada) Sylvain Larose	
1996	Columbus	United States	(United States) Pitt Crandlemire	
1997	Seattle	United States	(United States) Chris Mazza	
1998	Chapel Hill	United States	(United States) Chris Martin	
1999	Columbus	United States	(United States) Chris Mazza	
2000	Hunt Valley	United States	(United Kingdom) Simon Bouton	
2001	Denver	United States	(United States) David Hood	
2002	Chapel Hill	United States	(United States) Morgan Gurley	
2003	Washington	United States	(United States) Edward Hawthorne	
2004	Portland	United States	(United States) Ken Lemere	
2005	At Sea	United States; Mexico; Belize	(United States) Rick Desper	
2006	Charlottesville	United States	(United States) Hohn Cho	
2007	Vancouver	Canada	(United States) Doug Moore	
2008	Tysons Corner	United States	(United States) Chris Martin	
2009	Columbus	United States	(Australia) Andrew Goff	
2010	San Francisco	United States	(United States) Eric Mead	
2011	Fairlee, Vermont	United States	(United States) Chris Martin	
2012	Chicago	United States	(United States) Michael A. Binder	
2013	Silver Spring	United States	(United States) Nate Cockerill	
2014	Seattle	United States	(United Kingdom) Dan Lester	
2015	Philadelphia	United States	(United States) Chris Martin	
2016	Chicago	United States	(Canada) (United Kingdom) Chris Brand	
2017	Killington, Vermont	United States	(United States) Doug Moore	
2018	Washington	United States	(Australia) Andrew Goff	
2019	Seattle	United States	(United States) Steve Cooley	
2021	Dover, Vermont	United States	(United States) Adam Silverman	
2022	San Jose	United States	(Canada) Tanya Gill	
2023	Chapel Hill	United States	(United Kingdom) (Greece) Mikalis Kamaritis	
2024	Surrey	Canada	(United States) Katie Gray	
2025	Chicago	United States	(United States) Andrew Wu	
2026	Thornton	United States	(United States) David Miller	
2027	Baltimore	United States		

=== North American Grand Prix ===
The winner of each Grand Prix:

Year	Steps	Players	Winner
1999	7	58	(United States) Chris Martin
2000	14	125	(United States) Matt Shields
2001	34	166	(United States) Jerry Fest
2002	17	171	(United States) Andy Bartalone
2003	16	213	(United States) Edward Hawthorne
2004	14	305	(United States) Doug Moore
2005	13	234	(United States) Andrew Neumann
2006	12	200	(United States) Jim O'Kelley
2007	12	270	(United States) Doug Moore
2008	15	275	(United States) Thomas Haver
2009	10	182	(United States) Adam Sigal
2010	10	220	(United States) Peter Yeargin
2011	9	143	(United States) Chris Martin
2012	11	202	(United States) Michael A. Binder
2013	8	136	(United States) Graham Woodring
2014	8	188	(United Kingdom) Daniel Lester

== Europe ==
=== EuroDipCon ===
The location and winner of each EuroDipCon tournament is listed below:

Year	Host city	Host country	European Champion	Notes
1993	Paris	France	(France) Samy Malki	
1994	Linköping	Sweden	(France) Xavier Blanchot	
1995	Cirencester	Great Britain	(Norway) Inge Kjøl	
1996	Oslo	Norway	(Norway) Inge Kjøl	
1997	Namur	Belgium	(France) Cyrille Sevin	
1998	Bedford	Great Britain	(United Kingdom) Toby Harris	
1999	Turku	Finland	(United Kingdom) Simon Bouton	
2000	Paris	France	(Sweden) Leif Bergman	
2001	Dublin	Ireland	(Republic of Ireland) Paraic Reddington	
2002	Malmö	Sweden	(Norway) Frank Johansen	
2003	Dogana	San Marino	(France) Yann Clouet	
2004	Darmstadt	Germany	(United States) Edi Birsan	
2005	Utrecht	Netherlands	(United Kingdom) Simon Bouton	
2006	Cheshunt	Great Britain	(France) Benjamin Pouillès-Duplaix	
2007	Marseille	France	(France) Fabien Grellier	
2008	Brunate	Italy	(Italy) Luca Pazzaglia	
2009	Bonn	Germany	(Germany) André Ilievics	
2010	Paris	France	(Germany) Fabian Straub	
2011	Derby	Great Britain	(France) Gwen Maggi	
2012	Serravalle	San Marino	(France) Nicolas Sahuguet	
2013	Namur	Belgium	(France) Gwen Maggi	
2014	Rome	Italy	(Australia) Peter McNamara	
2015	Leicester	Great Britain	(France) Cyrille Sevin	
2016	Paris	France	(France) Gwen Maggi	
2017	Milan	Italy	(France) Gwen Maggi	
2018	Paris	France	(France) Lei Saarlainen	
2019	Marseille	France	(France) Gwen Maggi	
2020	Sion	Switzerland	(Russia) Alex Lebedev	
2021	Serravalle	San Marino	(Russia) Alex Lebedev	
2022	Sierre	Switzerland	(Switzerland) Christophe Borgeat	
2023	Paris	France	(Netherlands) Jelte Kuiper	
2024	Sion	Switzerland	(United States) Karthik Konath	
2025	Leiden	Netherlands	(Canada) Tanya Gill	
2026	Chesterfield	Great Britain	(United Kingdom) Christopher Ward	
2027	Dresden	Germany		

=== European Grand Prix ===
The winner of each Grand Prix is listed below:

Year	Nb of steps	Nb of players	Winner
2002	10	283	(France) William Attia
2003	11	349	(France) Yann Clouet
2004	15	472	(France) Yann Clouet
2005	13	364	(France) Gwen Maggi
2006	14	340	(France) Gwen Maggi
2007	14	272	(France) Gwen Maggi
2008	11	207	(France) Emmanuel du Pontavice
2009	11	175	(France) Gwen Maggi
2010	8	172	(France) Gwen Maggi
2011	6	108	(France) Gwen Maggi
2012	5	76	(United Kingdom) Dave Simpson
2013	7	112	(France) Gwen Maggi
2014	6	81	(France) Gwen Maggi
2015	8	116	(Italy) Matteo Anfossi
2025	12	251	(Netherlands) Maaike Blom

== Asia Pacific Region ==
=== Asia Pacific Championships ===
The Asia Pacific Championships were first held in a minimal capacity in 2023, to coincide with the 2023 Bangkok WDC. From 2024 the APAC Championships have been managed by the Asia Pacific Diplomacy Association (APDA), and held annually.

Each APAC Champion is listed below:

Year	Host city	Host country	APAC Champion
2023	Siem Reap	Cambodia	(Canada) (United Kingdom) Chris Brand
2024	Melbourne	Australia	(Australia) Max Wanji Roe Banks
2025	Brisbane	Australia	(Australia) Zoe Cameron
2026	Bangkok	Thailand	(Australia) Shane Armstrong

=== Bismark Cup ===
In the early 1980s the Diplomacy scene in Australia was built around several PBM Diplomacy magazines, of which the most significant titles were Rumplestiltskin, The Go Between, Beowulf, Victoriana, The Journal of Australian Diplomacy, and The Envoy. Most of the tournament players were subscribers, players and editors of these magazines. The Envoy, which was published between 1986 and 1991, ran a series of articles which were both popular and influential. Purportedly written by Arthur von Bismark and styled as lecture transcripts, the character of Arthur von Bismark became celebrated among the contemporary Diplomacy subculture in Australia.

The articles were popular at a time when tournament play in Australia had become more organized, with well-attended tournaments in Adelaide, Canberra, Melbourne and Sydney. Rating systems at the time were being hotly debated and many players desired a way to assess the best player in the tournament scene for a calendar year, as a way of overcoming the perceived inconsistencies of rating systems within one event. The annual trophy concept was accepted among the then-principle organizers of these tournaments and the title Arthur Bismark Cup was suggested by The Envoy's then-editor Mathew Gibson.

The real author of these Arthur von Bismark articles was never announced publicly, but was suspected as being either Harry Kolotas, Marion Ashworth, Neil Ashworth or Luke Clutterbuck.

When The National Tournaments Championship was created, its perpetual trophy was named The Arthur Bismark Cup (usually referred to as simply the Bismark Cup). The title of Bismark Cup Champion was awarded by the Diplomacy Association of Australia and New Zealand (DAANZ), now awarded by the APDA, for the best aggregate tournament results at Diplomacy tournaments held in Australia and New Zealand during the calendar year. It is an annual (short term) ranking. The exact number of points awarded depends on the size of the tournaments and the person's placing in that tournament.

The winner of each Bismark Cup is listed below:

Year	# of steps	# of players	Winner
1989			(Australia) Robert Wessels
1990			(Australia) Harry Kolotas
1991	3	75	(Australia) Robert Wessels
1992	5	123	(Australia) Steve Gould
1993	6	93	(Australia) Harry Kolotas
1994			(Australia) Craig Sedgwick
1995			(Australia) Rob Stephenson
1996	5	65	(Australia) Craig Sedgwick
1997	5	74	(Australia) Bill Brown
1998	7	92	(Australia) Rob Stephenson
1999	8	117	(New Zealand) Brandon Clarke
2000	9	111	(Australia) Rob Stephenson
2001	10	104	(Australia) Tristan Lee
2002	7	84	(Germany) (New Zealand) Rob Schöne
2003	6	52	(Australia) Geoff Kerr
2004	8	56	(New Zealand) Grant Steel
2005	8	65	(Australia) Tony Collins
2006	10	76	(Australia) Sean Colman
2007	Not held		
2008	7	58	(Australia) Andrew Goff
2009	7	69	(Australia) Shane Cubis
2010	7	69	(Australia) Thorin Munro
2011	5	49	(New Zealand) Grant Steel
2012–2015	Not held		
2016	?	??	(New Zealand) Tim Jones
2017–2023	Not held		
2024	5	34	(Australia) Marcus Loane
2025	7	114	(Australia) Shane Armstrong

== Diplomacy World Cup ==
The Diplomacy World Cup is a team-based tournament in Online Diplomacy, a format in which phases are processed once every one or two days, and all correspondence is sent in written form via the host site. Players in online tournaments often play under pseudonyms, and accept the title under these names.

Two different tournaments, the Diplomacy National World Cup and the webDiplomacy World Cup, are grouped together in this category. The Diplomacy National World Cup only ran twice, once in 2007 and once in 2010. The webDiplomacy World Cup had its first iteration in 2010, and runs once every two years, with the exception of 2014 as the 2012 World Cup was still ongoing. WebDiplomacy World Cup teams are not country-specific, and can instead be from regions.

Edition	Members of the World champion team	Members of second team	Members of third team
2007	France; Emmanuel du Pontavice; Fabrice Essner; Jean-Luc Granier; Fabien Grellier; Michel Lacroix; Gwen Maggi; Jean-Pierre Maulion; Nicolas Sahuguet (Spain) Rubén Sanchez García Luengo de Madrid; Cyrille Sevin	Italy; Enrico Agamennone (United States) Alessio Cei; Giovanni Cesarini; Davide Cleopadre; Marco Noseda Pedraglio; Luca Pazzaglia; Roberto Perego; Leonardo Quirini; Andrea Ziffer	Argentina; Leonardo Colangelo; Pablo Echevarría; Mike Goldfeld; Martin Kaplan; Marcelo Larroque (Uruguay) Ismael Puga (Chile) Felipe Sanchez; Ariel Max Sanchez Romero
2010	Ireland (Republic of Ireland) Mike Cosgrave (Republic of Ireland) Brian Dennehy (Republic of Ireland) Aidan Duggan (Republic of Ireland) Conor Kostick (Republic of Ireland) Cian O'Rathaille (Republic of Ireland) Nigel Phillips (United Kingdom) Rick Powell	United States; Kevin Dietz; Jim Green; Melinda Holley; Brian McCain; Pete Marinaro; Charles Mullin; Kyra Olson (India) Yashwant Parmar; Eric Sorenson	France; Frédéric Coste; Fabrice Essner; Gwen Maggi; Jean-Pierre Maulion; Jean-François Mougard; Reynald Nicod; Vincent Reulet; Nicolas Sahuguet (Spain) Rubén Sanchez García Luengo de Madrid; Cyrille Sevin
2010	South America (Brazil) Rubetok (Captain) (Argentina) Xapi (Brazil) JesusPetry (Brazil) rdrivera2005	Southeast Europe (Greece) hellalt (Captain) (Slovenia) Kompole (Croatia) Dejan0707 (Greece) Ouraguinus	Iberia (Spain) (United States) JECE (Captain) (Spain) Silver Wolf (United States) StevenC. (Portugal) Troodonte
2012	California A (United States) The Hanged Man (Captain) (United States) uclabb (Assistant Captain) (United States) Tasnica (United States) Mujus	Iberia (Spain) (United States) JECE (Captain) (Portugal) Troodonte (Assistant Captain) (Spain) gantz (Portugal) (Serbia) MuadDib	The Balkans (Greece) hellalt (Captain) (United Kingdom) (Greece) Hellenic Riot (Assistant Captain) (Hungary) rokakoma (Slovenia) Kompole
2016	Cascadia (United States) ghug (Captain) (Canada) VillageIdiot (Assistant Captain) (United States) MadMarx (United States) Balki Bartokomous (United States) thatwasawkward	Dixie (United States) Gen. Lee (Captain) (United States) ckroberts (Assistant Captain) (United States) eturnage (United States) The Czech (United States) DrCJG	Sweden; Vixol (Captain); Seichuto (Assistant Captain); AronAmbrosiani; SunRa
2018	Cascadia (United States) Balki Bartokomous (Canada) VillageIdiot (United States) ghug (United States) cspieker (United States) MadMarx	Greatest Lakes (United States) Tom Bombadil (Canada) Durga (United States) Yigg (United States) Yoyoyozo (United States) peterwiggin (United States) jmo1121109	California (United States) ezio (United States) micha (United States) slypups (United States) Ogion (United States) The Hanged Man
2020	Yorkshire Puddings (United Kingdom) CaptainMeme (Captain) (United Kingdom) Brumark (United Kingdom) Scarabus (United Kingdom) desdemona22 (United Kingdom) teccles	Eastern Canada; Hamilton Brian (Captain) cdngooner Yonni; Peregrine Falcon; Lando Calrissian	Prosecco (Italy) gimix (Captain) (Italy) Riccardo Falconi (Italy) Babbo Natale (Italy) Superwerty (Italy) Randaz20

== See also ==
- List of world championships in mind sports
