= Lindsay J. Sedgwick =

Irish screenwriter, author and journalist

Lindsay Jane Sedgwick is an Irish screenwriter, playwright, journalist, producer and author.

== Biography ==
Sedgwick grew up in Sutton, North Co. Dublin. Sedgwick's first TV commissions were in 1990, being RTÉ's Fair City, and Scratch Saturday, and started working full-time as a screenwriter in 1998. Other film credits included RTÉ's Wildernuts (1995) and Kristina, with the latter winning the Best Feature award at the Swansea on Sea Film Festival.

In 1996, Sedgwick won the One Act Play Award for her play, Trade Me A Dream. Her play, Trade Me a Dream, which, according to the Evening Herald, dealt "with conflict caused by the Troubles in Ireland," opened as a production in August 1997. In September 1997, she won the One Act Writers' Award for her produced play Fur Doesn't Hurt. The Irish Examiner stated that the play "is about a young, wheelchair-bound man, who recounts his story to help him cope with his mother's death" and opined that the play was "quite fascinating in language, which is rich and full of powerful imagery." During the 1990s, she was a regular feature contributor and theatre reviewer for the Irish Press and the Irish Independent national newspapers.

Sedgwick is serving as the Screenwriter-in-Residence at Maynooth University and Kildare Co. Council Library and Arts Service. In 2016/17, she obtained a Master of Arts (MA) degree in Screenwriting for Film & TV from Leeds Metropolitan University, which she completed in 1999. Sedgwick was a New York University, Gregory Peck Scriptwriting Scholar in 1993. In 2002, she graduated from Moonstone. Additionally, in 2012, she established the Creatives in Animation Network with the purpose of facilitating partnerships between writers and animation professionals, aiming to encourage collaborative efforts. Her plays have been staged in Ireland and the UK, as well as broadcast on BBC Radio 4. She is also the author of the Wulfie children's novel series, published by Little Island Books.

Sedgwick was the creator of Punky, the RTÉ children's animation series, and the first of such in the world in which a character with Down syndrome was the main subject.

As of 2023, Sedgwick was chairperson of the Irish Writers Union, in which capacity she supported the 2023 Writers Guild of America strike in an interview with Dublin FM104.
