= Epic (novel) =

2004 novel by Conor Kostick

- 2007 U.S. edition
- Author: Conor Kostick
- Language: English
- Series: Avatar Chronicles
- Genre: Fantasy, Computer games, LitRPG
- Publisher: O'Brien Press
- Publication place: Ireland
- English publication date: 2004
- Media type: Print (paperback and hardcover)
- Pages: 315
- ISBN: 978-1-74167-466-8
- OCLC: 224779356
- Followed by: Saga

Epic is a novel written by Conor Kostick. It is the first book in the Avatar Chronicles trilogy and was published in 2004 by O'Brien Press and Viking Press.

== Plot summary ==
Epic takes place on a world named New Earth and follows the life of a boy named Erik Haraldson and his involvement in a game called Epic. Epic is a virtual game which echoes World of Warcraft and EverQuest, although interaction with this game directly affects income, social standing, and the careers of the people who play. Because of this relationship a growing separation of power occurs that mimics the real world, where those with money and power tend to keep it, and those without tend to stay impoverished (both in-game and in real life). In order to build up acclaim in the game, and thus in real life, poor players must work in-game for their entire lives in hopes of becoming powerful enough to take part in challenges set forth by the elite for prizes. With these prizes the citizens may live more comfortably in real life.

If a community wishes to redress a perceived injustice, they may challenge Central Allocations or C. A., which is a powerful, select group of nine individuals that controls all of the world's resources and funds the most powerful characters in the game world. All of the members of C. A. are wealthy and possess nearly unbeatable characters in the game. These are the individuals who set challenges which are held in special arenas where various players may attack each other - the last player alive is proclaimed the winner. If one wins against the Central Allocations team, then one gets what one wants, be it a new law, a medical procedure, or a material object. However, if one loses then everything one's character owns (including items and money) is forfeited and that person must create a new in-game character. Since death in the game results in death of the character, challenges are a risky method of gaining prosperity, as the characters involved are usually trained for months to years of real life time.

The story opens with Erik determined to obtain revenge for the unjust treatment of his parents. Unknown to Erik, his father, Harald, was exiled because he hit another person (Ragnok, a future member of Central Allocations). Ragnok was trying to assault Harald's wife. Having escaped from exile, Harald had hidden in a small out-of-the-way community with his wife, where they had Erik. In order to help his local friends, Harald challenges Central Allocations hoping to remain unknown to them, but his character is identified and he is exiled once more. Before these events, Erik had become fed up with the game, squandering many lives of his avatars in fighting Inry'aat, the Red Dragon, who guards a massive treasure hoard. Most of these attempts are spent trying to figure out a quick way to defeat the dragon. As an expression of his discontent with the world, Erik had gone against convention in making a human female avatar, which he named Cindella and had deliberately chosen an almost unknown character class, swashbuckler. He put all of his ability points into beauty, which most players consider a waste, as beauty has no benefit in battle. This, incidentally, is the cause for the bland, gray characters that predominate in Epic. But curiously, the tale takes a twist and Erik inherits much wealth from his investment in beauty as the game itself begins to respond to his unique avatar. As a result and freed by the plight of his parents from having to play the game in the usual, risk-avoiding grind, Erik dares to dream he can kill the red dragon and with its wealth, challenge the power of C. A.

With his friends' help and the use of a strategy he figured out from studying Inry'aat, the red dragon is indeed slain, and as a result Erik and his friends become some of the richest and most famous characters in all of Epic. Each of the group gains about four million bezants, which amounts to more wealth than they could earn in over one hundred thousand years of normal play. This victory propels the teenagers into a series of unexpected encounters including with an evil vampyre (who can kill people in real life from inside the game); the Executioner of C. A. (can kill people in-game); a sinister Dark Elf, and the Avatar of the game itself. The Avatar and the vampyre play a central role in the plot, as they are the opposing sides of the persona that the game itself inexplicably developed. The Avatar represents the game's desire to end its existence and save the people of New Earth, while the vampyre reflects its desire to simply continue existing. They balance each other out in the final conflict of the book, leaving Erik to revolutionise his world by ending the game of Epic.

== Awards ==
- Epic was awarded a place on the International Board on Books for Young People honours list for 2006.
- A School Library Journal Best Book of the Year 2007.
- A New York Public Library book for the teen age, 2008.

== Sequels ==
The book was followed by two sequels, making the Avatar Chronicles a trilogy. The sequels are Saga and Edda.

A 2019 LitRPG publication, The Dragon's Revenge, is set on Earth in the near future and sees the protagonist enter the game of Epic. This is a prequel to the events of the off-Earth colony.
