= Jack Harte (writer) =

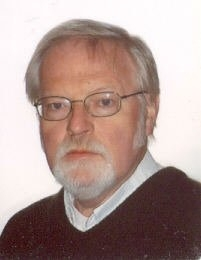
- Born: 1 September 1944 (age 81); Killeenduff, Ireland
- Occupations: Short story writer, novelist
- Website: www.jackharte.com

Jack Harte is an Irish short story writer and novelist. He founded the Irish Writers' Union and the Irish Writers Centre.

== Background ==
Harte was born on 1 September 1944 in Killeenduff, near Easkey in County Sligo. At an early age, his family moved to Lanesboro, County Longford, where his blacksmith father found work with Bord na Mona. Harte draws on the experience of this uprooting in his novel In the Wake of the Bagger. Later he moved to Dublin where he worked at many jobs, including the civil service and teaching; from 1983-2000, he was principal of Lucan Community College.

== Short stories ==
Harte has published several critically acclaimed collections of short stories. His first, Murphy in the Underworld (1986), was welcomed by the Sunday Independent as "one of the most important story collections for some time." After publication of his second collection, Birds and Other Tails (1996), the Irish Independent described Harte as "a wonderful refreshing voice in contemporary Irish writing." Both these collections are out of print, although several of their stories are included in From Under Gogol's Nose (2004).

Several short stories and collections have been published in translation. These include Birds and Selected Stories, published in Bulgarian in 2001, Dream of A Pyramid, published in Hindi in 2006, and From Under Gogol's Nose, published in Russian by Voskresenye Publishing House, Moscow, in 2007.

== Novels ==
Harte's first novel, In the Wake of the Bagger, was published in 2006. It was commissioned by Sligo Co Council under the Irish Government's Per Cent for Art scheme. It tells the story of the Dowd family, who are uprooted from their home in Killeenduff and resettle as economic migrants in the Irish Midlands. It describes the tension between the traditional Irish way of life and the new realities of industrialisation in rural Ireland. The novel was described in the Irish Independent as "one of the great books about Ireland." It was selected by Des Kenny as one of his 101 Irish Books You MUST Read – Kenny's Choice.

Harte's second novel is Reflections in a Tar-Barrel. It weaves the story of Tommy Loftus who sells religious goods in Ireland's west.

Unravelling the Spiral is an account of the life of Harte's cousin, sculptor Fred Conlon. Harte and Conlon were born within ten months of each other in the townland of Killeenduff, grew up together, and were close friends until Conlon's death.

== Arts organiser ==
Harte was an organiser for the arts in Ireland throughout the 1970s and 1980s. In 1986, Harte founded the Irish Writers' Union. The following year he secured funding from the Irish government to establish the Irish Writers Centre. In December 2008, the Arts Council of Ireland withdrew the Centre's funding because of concerns about "value for money and quality of service to writers". In 2009, the Centre was on the point of closing. Harte was elected chairman and, with the help of other activists, kept the Centre open.
