= Philip Casey =

Irish poet and novelist (1950–2018)

- Born: Philip Casey; 1950; London, England
- Died: 2018 (aged 67–68); Dublin

Philip Casey (1950-2018) was an Irish poet and novelist.

== Life ==
Philip Casey was born in London on 27 June 1950. His parents were from County Laois and County Sligo and they returned to live in County Wexford, Ireland. After spending some years in Barcelona, Casey lived most of his adult life in Dublin.

He wrote both poems and novels. He also reviewed poems for the Irish Press.

He died in Dublin in 2018.

He was a member of Aosdana.

== Works ==
=== Poetry ===
- Those Distant Summers (Raven Arts Press, 1980)
- After Thunder (Raven Arts Press, 1985)
- The Year of the Knife (Raven Arts Press, 1995)
- Dialogue in Fading Light (New Island Books, 2006)
- Tried and Sentenced. Selected poems (eMaker Editions, 2014)

=== Novels ===
- The Fabulists (Lilliput Press, 1995)
- The Water Star (Picador, 1999)
- The Fisher Child (Picador, 2001)
- The Coupla

== Awards ==
- Member, Aosdána

== See also ==
- List of Irish writers
