= Dromore West =

Dromore West An Droim Mór Thiar
- Village
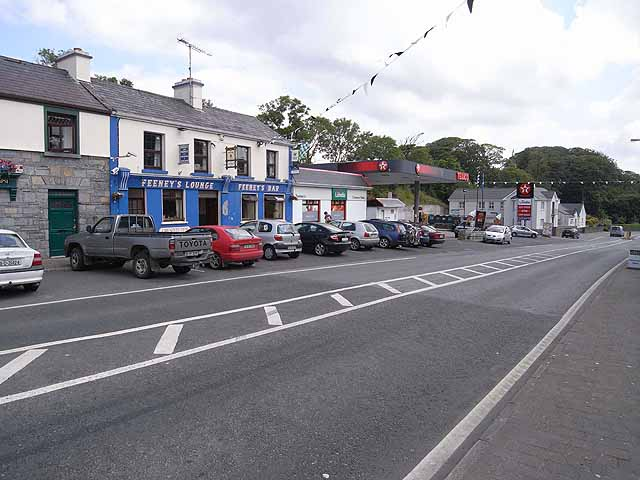
- Dromore West lies on the N59

- Location in Ireland
- Coordinates: 54°15′06″N 8°53′35″W
- Country: Ireland
- Province: Connacht
- County: County Sligo
- Elevation: 56 m (184 ft)

Population (2022)
  - Total: 292
- Irish Grid Reference: G418340

Dromore West (Irish: An Droim Mór Thiar) is a village in County Sligo, Ireland. The village, which is situated on the banks of the Dunneil River, is located along the N59 between the Ox Mountains and the Atlantic Ocean. Dromore West lies on Wild Atlantic Way coastal tourist route. The village had a population of 292 as of the 2022 census.

== History ==
=== Built heritage ===
Evidence of ancient settlement in the area includes a number of ringfort and tower house sites in the townlands of Dromore, Knockaculleen and Dunneill. To the north of the village, on Ballykilcash Hill, is an early 19th-century Napoleonic-era signal tower (Carrownrush Tower).

A former Presbyterian church within the village, now derelict, was built c. 1850. The modern Catholic church, the Church of Our Lady of Perpetual Succour, is in the Roman Catholic Diocese of Killala.

=== Nine Years War ===
In 1600, Red Hugh O'Donnell, a sixteenth-century Irish clan chief and Lord of Tyrconnell, visited Dromore West. He came to make peace with the Connacht clans and to seek their help for his march to Kinsale during the Nine Years' War (Ireland) (1593–1603).

=== Dromore West Poor Law Union & Workhouse ===
Dromore West became a Poor Law Union in 1849. This new union, established from parts of the Sligo and Ballina Unions, covered 152 square miles and had a population of 13,034 by the 1901 census. The union comprised electoral divisions including Aughris, Castleconor, Dromard, Easky, Kilglass, Skreen, Templeboy, and Toberpatrick.

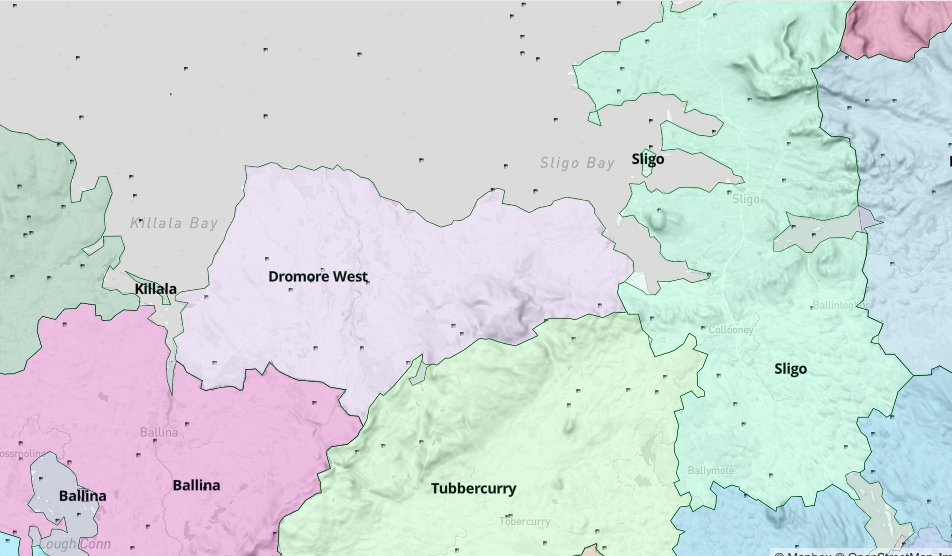
Dromore West Poor Law Union Extent

The Dromore West Union initially sought to avoid constructing a workhouse by using a facility in Sligo, but disagreements led to the erection of a new workhouse between 1850 and 1852, designed by George Wilkinson. The workhouse, built on a six-acre site, could accommodate 400 inmates and cost £4,650. Its design followed Wilkinson’s standard plans, with distinct wings for men and women, a T-shaped layout for the main buildings, and a rear hospital block. The workhouse also had a cemetery and a memorial stone dedicated to those buried there.

In the 1870s, a scandal involving a female inmate and the son of the Board of Guardians’ chairman brought attention to the lax discipline within the workhouse. By the 1920s, the workhouse fell into financial difficulty due to IRA ambushes during the War of Independence, and in 1923, it was burned by anti-treaty forces to prevent its use by British forces.

The workhouse buildings later served various purposes before being converted into residential spaces in the 1980s. The current owners continue to restore parts of the historic structure.

=== 20th century ===
Hannah Rutledge Ormsby, also known as Ruth, was born near Dromore West in 1901. A qualified nurse, she traveled to Spain in 1936 to care for wounded Spanish Republicans and International Brigades during the Spanish Civil War. She died there in May 1938, being the only Irishwoman to die in the Spanish Civil War.

== People ==
- Patrick Collins RHA (1911–1994), a 20th century painter, was born in Dromore West.

== See also ==
- List of towns and villages in Ireland
