= Brendan Lynch (writer) =

Irish journalist (born 1937)

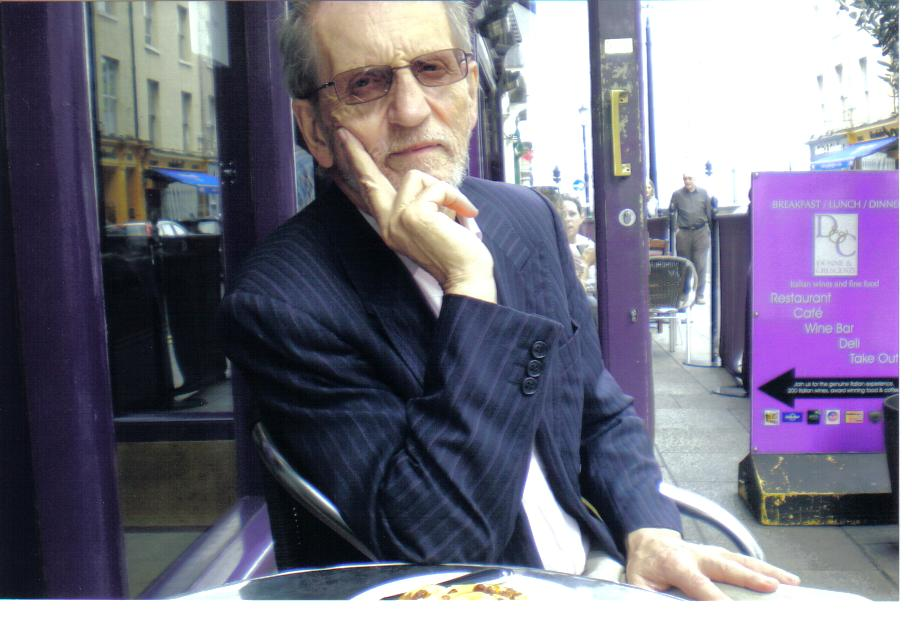
- Brendan Lynch
- Born: 1937 (age 88–89); Abbeyfeale, County Limerick
- Occupation: Contemporary Irish author
- Spouse: Margie Lynch (1997–present)
- Writing career
- Language: English
- Period: 1988 to current
- Website: brendanlynch.ie

Brendan Lynch (born 1937, Abbeyfeale, County Limerick) is a former motor racing journalist and contemporary Irish author. He spent his youth in Toomevara, County Tipperary. He is married and lives in Dublin.

== Early life ==
Educated at St. Flannan's College, Ennis and CBS, Nenagh, Lynch represented his native Tipperary in cycle racing and won his first race at the age of 17. His biggest success was the 1956 100 km Cooper Cup race in Dublin's Phoenix Park.

== Career ==
Lynch spent a number of years working as a clerk in Dublin. During this time he met writers Brendan Behan and Patrick Kavanagh and wrote his first newspaper features. In 1961, he emigrated to London, where he became a disciple of the pacifist philosopher, Bertrand Russell and was imprisoned in Brixton for his Campaign for Nuclear Disarmament activities.

After ten years working in a bank, a succession of part-time jobs enabled him to satisfy his longtime ambitions to go motor racing. He survived a number of serious accidents and won one race at Mondello Park in 1976.

Lynch obtained a trophy from World Champion Emerson Fittipaldi, Lynch raced in Irish Formula Vee which was created by David Sheane in County Wicklow which enabled cash-starved enthusiasts to race on a small budget.

His articles on motor racing for the Fulham Chronicle and Kensington Post led to features in Autosport and Motoring News and international journals such as Autosprint (Bologna) and Autosport (Canada). Within a short while, he became Grand Prix correspondent for Irish media and also the London-based Daily Mail and The Observer.

Lynch traveled extensively in Europe and Asia before returning to Dublin in 1985 to concentrate on feature writing and books. He has written general features for many media outlets, including The Irish Times, Sunday Tribune, The Times and The European.

He is a member of the Irish Writers' Union, Irish PEN, and The Guild of Motoring Writers. In 1988 he won the latter's "Pierre Dreyfus Award" (presented annually by Renault in honour of Pierre Dreyfus, president director general of Renault from 1955 to 1975) for his first book, Green Dust.

== Books ==
- Green Dust. Ireland’s Unique Motor Racing History. Portobello Publishing (1988) ISBN 0-9513668-0-7
- Triumph of the Red Devil. The Gordon Bennett Cup Race 1903. Portobello Publishing (14 Nov 2002) ISBN 0-9513668-1-5
- There Might Be A Drop Of Rain Yet. A Memoir. Currach Press (1 May 2006) ISBN 1-85607-937-6
- Parsons Bookshop. At the Heart of Bohemian Dublin, 1949-1989. The Liffey Press (15 May 2007) The Liffey Press.com ISBN 1-905785-11-9
- Yesterday We Were In America. Alcock and Brown – First to Fly the Atlantic Non-Stop. J H Haynes & Co Ltd (26 Feb, 2009) ISBN 1-84425-681-2
- Prodigals and Geniuses: The Writers and Artists of Dublin's Baggotonia. The Liffey Press (2011) ISBN 978-1-905785-96-4
- City of Writers. The Lives and Homes of Dublin Authors. The Liffey Press (2013) ISBN 978-1-908308-45-0
