= Treasure Trap =

Role-playing game

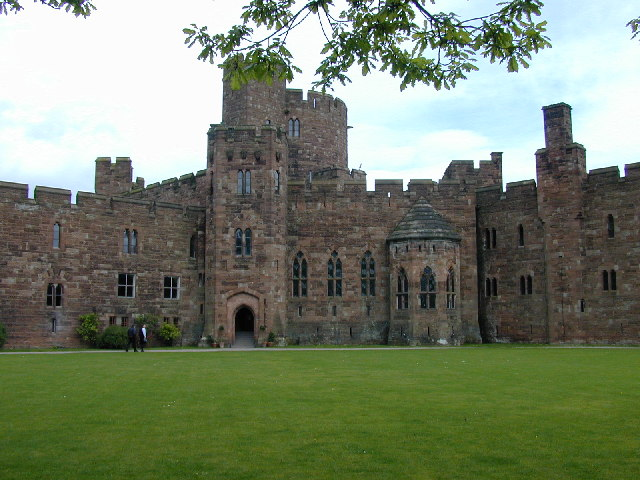
Peckforton Castle, the home of the original Treasure Trap

Treasure Trap was a live action role-playing game established at Peckforton Castle in Cheshire in April 1982. Various splinter groups broke from the original system, some retaining the Treasure Trap name, and helped to shape the later British LARP scene.

== Peckforton Castle ==
The original Peckforton Castle game was a fantasy game run by business partners Peter Carey and Rob Donaldson. The group ran events mainly over weekends, but also some week-long adventures moving across the country and ending at the castle.

The venue gained fame when it appeared on the popular BBC television programme Blue Peter, with two of the show's presenters, Simon Groom and Peter Duncan, playing the game. Shields with the show's ship logo on them were made for the occasion. When working as a local news reporter, Ben Elton once also presented a programme from the castle and took part in an adventure.

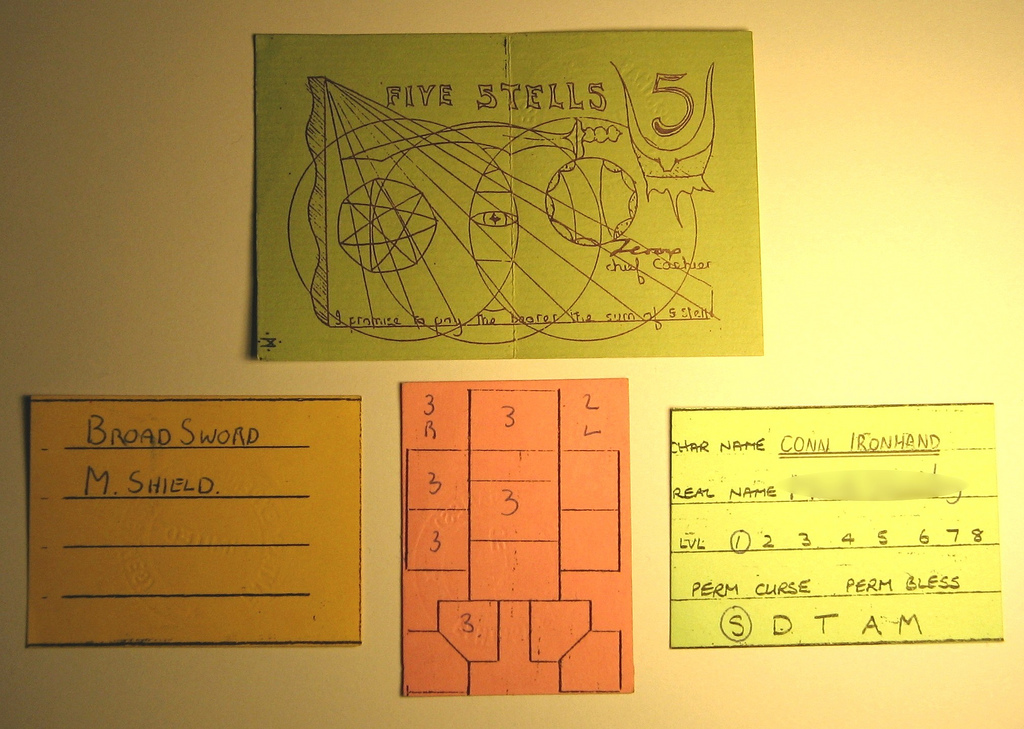
Cards & Stells used in the original Treasure Trap game

As in most role-playing games, players would assume a new identity (or character) during the game, each character having certain skills and abilities which were recorded on cards. Characters might join a guild, which was essentially a character class, giving them access to a particular set of skills. Players could progress through the guild hierarchy as their skills developed.

Players would play the game in costume, ranging from basic hessian tabards for novice players to armour such as chain mail for experienced players whose characters had gained game wealth (measured in Stells) in previous games to be able to afford its purchase. Conventional weaponry was restricted to padded or rubber weapons and wooden shields, although more unconventional weaponry was also allowed, such as tennis balls or dye-filled eggshells used to represent the spells thrown by a wizard character.

The game scenarios were initiated by a "brief" who was in role and would explain the games' objectives, which might be such things as rescuing someone from a group of hostile monsters. Players would attempt to complete the objectives in small groups (parties). They would be followed by Referees (see below) who would call 'time out' at the end of the battle and adjudicate on the effects. Game play would continue until all the adventurers were killed or the objectives were achieved. Irish author Conor Kostick, then a teenager, was one of the system's designers.

Health was measured in Life Points, both total and per each body location (head, chest, abdomen, legs and arms). Weapon damage affected both of these and armour reduced this damage. This system was heavily influenced by the RuneQuest table-top role-playing game. When describing a battle, the degree of a hit was often explained using the local jargon of dob (mild), twat (stronger) and smeg (strongest): "I twatted her but she smegged me back."

Peckforton Castle itself was built in Victorian times, which made it perfect for its new purpose because it looked like a newish castle. It had great halls, towers (one of which was burned out accidentally during a game), and tunnels, and was big enough so that several different adventures could be going on simultaneously, and players could play several adventures without getting to know the layout too well. The facilities were not great, however. Mice roamed freely, many of the dormitories had no beds in the early days, there was almost no water supply for washing and the toilets were famously dire.

== Monstering ==
Monsters were drawn from the body of players at the castle at the time, usually requiring sign up in advance. Monstering often involved putting on basic costumes and makeup. Because the monster or monsters would be positioned in advance, if the party was slow-moving the monster might have to wait several hours for a party to show up. Monsters were instructed in how to attack adventurers "in character", including falling down "dead" if they were inflicted with a fatal injury. Hit count was the normal method of working out if the monster should be dead or not. After being killed, a monster would then be "reset" further along the adventure, sometimes needing to pass through the adventuring party during a "time out" i.e. when the game had been stopped, for example to measure monster damage. Monster damage went by colour starting with red and going up via blue and green to black damage. In time groups of players who regularly monstered together started to form clans such as II Orc, Three Skulls & Four Skins (which were Orc clans) and 1st Ogre. People would also specialise in doing Basics - the initial adventure that everybody took as their first adventure. Because monstering was free, people with low incomes could spend years doing nothing other than monstering.

== Reffing ==
A single adventure would often have several refs. The referees organised the entire adventure, from monster sign up and placement to following the adventuring players at a discreet distance, carrying paper "Battle Boards" on which they would record combat scores between adventurers and monsters. Referees would count points based upon coloured markings left upon the adventurers' costumes, left by the monsters' weapons, which were coated in dye (actually poster paint) for this purpose, with different colours signifying different amounts of damage, or the presence of acid, poison, etc.

== Descendant clubs ==
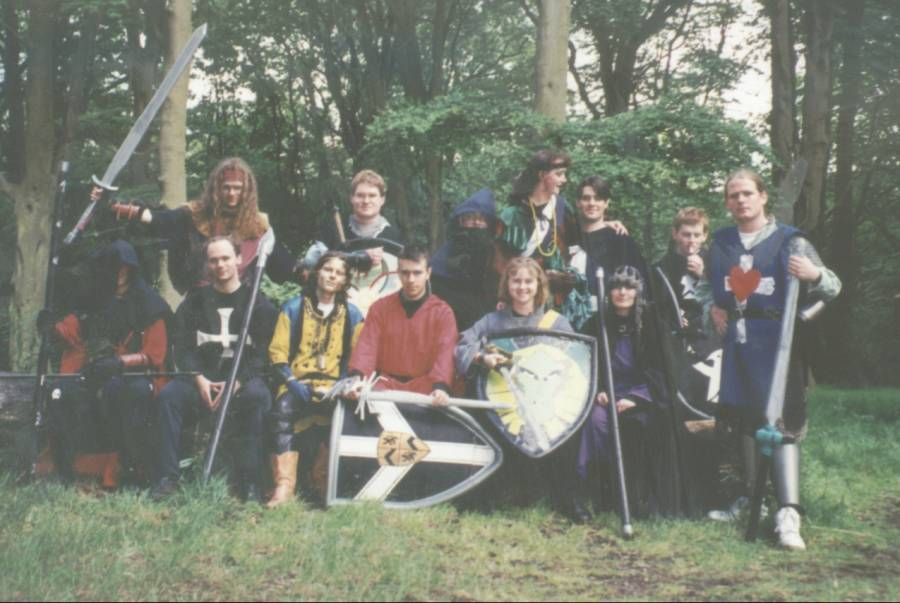
A group of Birmingham University Treasure Trap society members prepare to start an event in the Lickey Hills in 1997

Although the original club closed in 1985 (as a result of financial problems as well as losing access to the Castle) many of its attendees formed their own games, clubs and societies around the UK, frequently adopting similar rules and settings, and sometimes bearing the same name of Treasure Trap.

Durham University Treasure Trap was founded in February 1983 with the aim of helping members travel to Peckforton Castle. When the original Treasure Trap folded, members began running day-long adventures in the woods around Durham using the original Treasure Trap system. The society remains active today, and celebrated its 40th anniversary in 2023. It holds over sixty events a year and stakes claim to being the longest continuous running LARP and LARP world, with the world's history defined by over 40 years of role-play. Locations used by the society include Maiden Castle. The rules system has undergone many profound changes since the society was formed, although it is still recognisable as a descendant of the original Treasure Trap. The society runs weekly 'Interactives' set in a medieval themed bar, in which plot is generally dispensed and characters interact in a largely combat free environment, these are followed by weekly 'Adventures' which are used to progress or conclude plot, but are generally more combat heavy than the Interactives. DUTT also runs large one off events such as the Third year goodbye (3ygb) in the summer and the Pre-banquet bash in February time, the 3ygb lasts for 3 days and includes many former regulars of the DUTT, who get a chance to influence the world and plot for the years to come. In 2010 DUTT launched Nerd East a LARP/Gaming convention set within the Durham Students' Union, which attracted approximately 150 people in 2010 and close to 200 in 2011, the aim is to make a regular kit fare within the North East, due to its large LARP/Gaming population.

Cambridge University Treasure Trap was founded in 2002 by Jennifer Curtis and Toni Badnall, ex-members of Durham University Treasure Trap who had moved to Cambridge and wished to continue the hobby in the local area. After ten years it had diverged from DUTT in both rules and setting although remained recognisably the same game. CUTT ended in 2014, with the society renaming itself to Cambridge Larp Society.

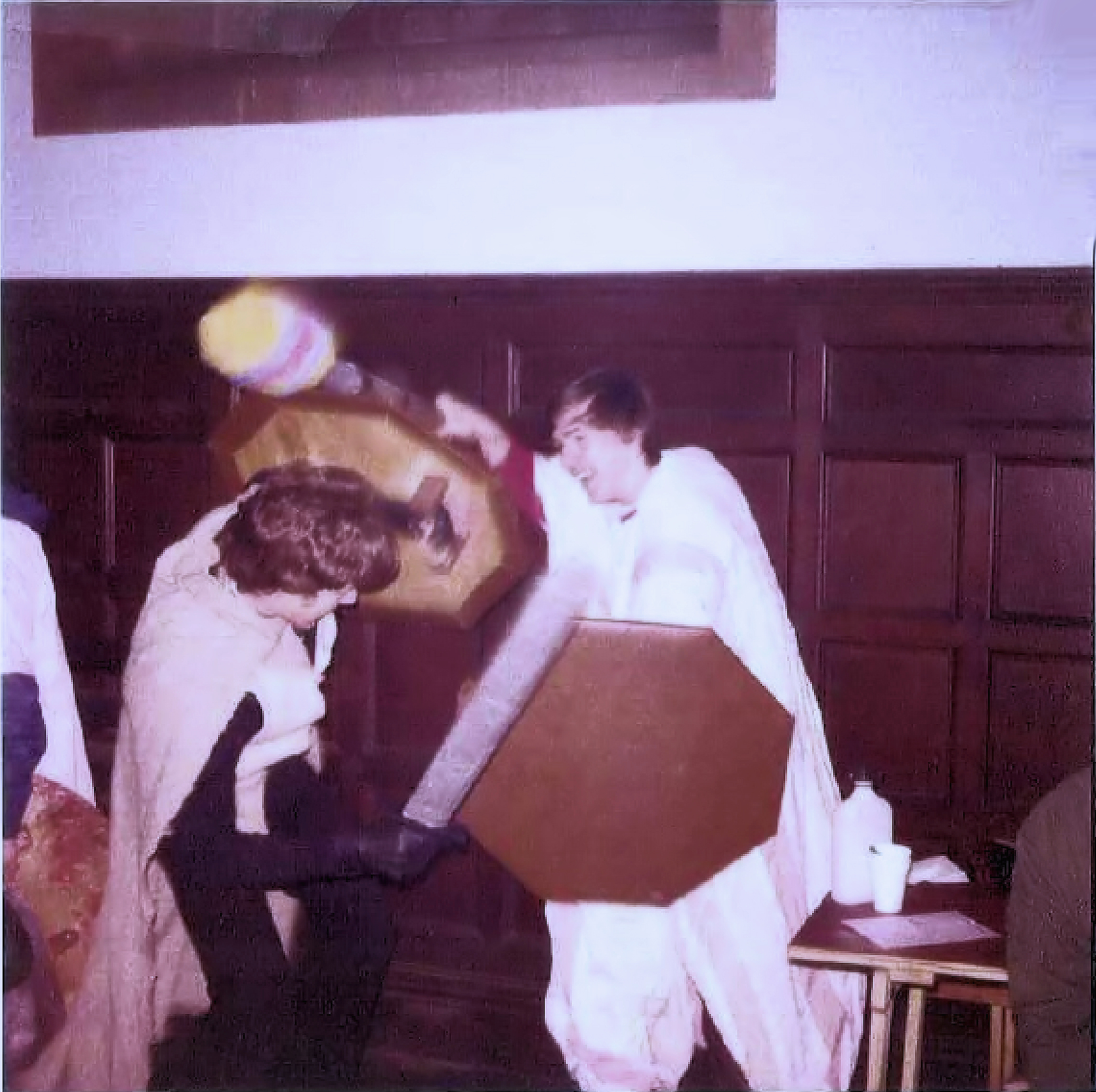
Getting some practice in just before an adventure begins. c.Jan 1983

Birmingham University Treasure Trap was also originally formed to help students attend Treasure Trap at Peckforton Castle. When the original Treasure Trap closed, Birmingham Trap members continued to run their own games in the local area, adopting the same rules and some of the setting. Lacking the luxury of a castle, Birmingham Treasure Trap would typically run single-day events consisting of two adventures, often twice a weekend. Popular sites included the Lickey Hills, Kinver Edge, and the University campus. Due to declining membership, Birmingham Treasure Trap stopped running events in 2002, and the society was formally closed in 2005, although former members still occasionally get together to run events using the game system.

At the University of Sussex, SWATT was founded in 2012 by Stephen Begley, an ex-member of Cambridge University Treasure Trap.

Other spin-off organisations which existed to run live-action role-playing games included Spirit of Adventure, Labyrinthe and others.

== Reception ==
Ian Livingstone reviewed Treasure Trap for White Dwarf #31, and stated that "I must admit that I thoroughly enjoyed myself on my three hour adventure which I managed to survive. I'm sure others will too, and I hope Messrs Carey and Donaldson manage to realise the full potential of Treasure Trap."

== Reviews ==
- Jeux & Stratégie #21
- Breakout #16
