= Easky =

Village in County Sligo, Ireland

Easky Iascaigh
- Village
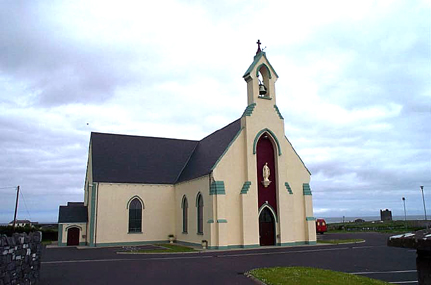
- St James R.C. Church

- Location in Ireland
- Coordinates: 54°17′19″N 8°57′42″W
- Country: Ireland
- Province: Connacht
- County: County Sligo

Population (2022)
  - Total: 235
- Time zone: UTC+0 (WET)
  - Summer (DST): UTC-1 (IST (WEST))
- Irish Grid Reference: G374381

Easky or Easkey (/ˈiːskiː/; Irish: Iascaigh, meaning 'abounding in fish') is a village in County Sligo, Ireland. It is on the Atlantic coast, 26 miles (42 km) from Sligo and 15 miles (24 km) from Ballina, County Mayo. The village name derives from the Irish language term for fish (iasc) and Iascaigh literally means "abounding in fish", due to the Easky River that lies adjacent to the village itself. Easky, as a parish, was originally called Imleach Iseal. The area is a tourist destination on account of its scenery and water sports. Easky is a designated area on Ireland's Wild Atlantic Way tourist route.

== History ==
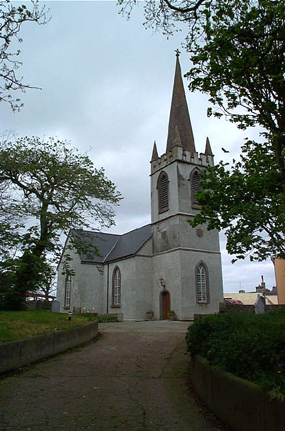
St Anne's Church of Ireland

The parish of Easky is part of the barony of Tireragh. Tireragh is a corruption of Tír Fhíacrach Múaidhe in Irish, meaning "the land of Fiachra of the Moy". This tuath was founded by the Uí Fiachrach Muaidhe, who were, themselves, a branch of the Uí Fiachrach dynasty of Connachta.

Easky was originally named Imleach Iseal/Isil which means the "low imleach", or "low land verging on the water". The first settlements in the area seem to have taken residence in Castletown, a townland that exists to the west of the present-day village. Geologists have become increasingly interested in the rugged coastline around Easky, as it holds fossil structures that date back for millions of years.

In John O'Donovan's textbook The Genealogies, Tribes and Customs of Hy-Fiachrach, commonly called O'Dowd's Country, it is documented that a man called Maoldubh, a son of Fiachra Ealgach (the son of King Daithi), was born and bred in Easky and established a fort in the area called "Dun Maoilduibh".

In O'Donovan's book, Easky is also mentioned through the following reference: "To Iasca, of the land of the white-blossomed apple-trees, Belongs the O'Mailduns of high renown." This is a reference to a powerful clan known – in modern parlance – as the O'Muldoons, a surname that is virtually non-existent in the area today. They held the "mansion seat" in Castletown and were defenders of the area at large.

In Samuel Lewis's 1837 publication of A Topographical Dictionary of Ireland, Easky was described as having 6,124 inhabitants, of which 289 were in the village. Lewis noted that the village (made up of one long street) had petty sessions every fortnight and that Wednesday was market day. As well as other more ancient architectural remains, he records the "considerable remains of the old castle of Rosslee, formerly belonging to the O'Dowds" and another castle in the Castletown townland.

== Landmarks ==
Landmarks in the area include O'Dowd Castle, which was built in 1207, and became home to the O'Dowd chieftains of Tireragh. The castle was originally built for Oliver McDonnell who came to the area to marry an O'Dowd widow. Located beside Easky pier, much of the original structure of the castle has been lost over time, yet the main body of the castle remains.

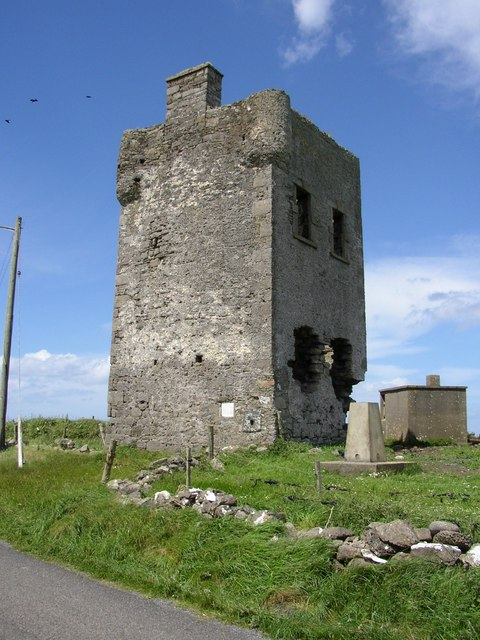
Rathlee signal tower is an early 19th century coastal defence fortification, located in the west of Easkey parish.

In the centre of Easkey village is the Old Abbey and graveyard which dates back to medieval times and remained in use until 1888, when Roslea Cemetery was opened. It lies to the east of the village, in the townland of Aderavoher. It opened in 1888 and was further extended in 2005.

Easky Bridge, built in 1847, provides access to the main village from the Sligo side of the area. It contains the Bullance stone, which is built into the bridge wall and is a symbolic drinking trough, which qualified the village to hold a "Fair Day". Hangings took place at the bridge in the 19th century.

Easky Courthouse, opposite the local vocational school, was built circa 1870. At the start of the 20th century, the County Sligo court held its sessions here. The building was attacked during the Irish Civil War. In 2010, the Courts Service of Ireland announced that Easky Courthouse would no longer hold its monthly sessions.

== Local amenities ==
The village itself has one café, a take-away, one pub, a general shop, a butcher, a hairdresser, a post-office, a pottery shop, St James's Roman Catholic church (which dates back to 1833) and St Anne's Church of Ireland (which dates back to 1820), a community centre with caravan and camping area and a History and Genealogy Centre.

To the east of the village is the local vocational school, Coláiste Iascaigh. The parish of Easky has three primary schools situated in the townlands of Rathlee, Killeenduff and Owenbeg. Another primary school is located in Easky village but has been closed since 2003. A creche now operates in this building.

== Sport ==
=== Gaelic football ===
The local Gaelic football club, Easkey GAA, was founded in 1888, just four years after the formation of the Gaelic Athletic Association. They were amongst the first teams to compete in the first Sligo Senior Football Championship of 1888, playing St John's in Collooney on 11 March 1888. The club was the focus of a segment of the RTÉ series Reeling in the Years. In the 1986 episode, it was highlighted that the club had lost 15 players (a full team) due to emigration to Britain and the USA. The club holds five Sligo Senior Football Championship titles, last contesting the 1999 Senior-Championship final (in which they were defeated by Tourlestrane).

=== Water sports ===
Easky is known for its surfing areas, including two reef breaks. In 1979, the Pro/Am Surfing World Championships came to Easky. Various national surfing events continue to be held here. In 1995 the Irish Surfing Association established its headquarters in the Easky Surf and Information Centre on Main Street. The building, now known as "Easkey House" is located in the centre of Easky village.

The Easky River is used for kayaking and canoeing. In 2003, Easky hosted the World Surf Kayaking Championships.

=== Walking ===
There are several walking routes around the river estuary and coastline (with views of the Slieve League and Benbulbin mountains) and through the local woods in the townland of Fortland.

== Culture ==
The writer Jack Harte was born in the Easky townland of Killeenduff, where his father was the local blacksmith.

The sculptor Fred Conlon was born and grew up in Killeenduff, Easky.

The mother of Irish playwrights Martin McDonagh (director of the film In Bruges) and John Michael McDonagh (director of The Guard) comes from Easky. John Michael McDonagh filmed Calvary in Easky village and the surrounding area.

== Local townlands ==
The parish of Easky contains numerous localised townland names. They are (in alphabetical order): Aderavoher, Alternan Park, Ballybeg, Ballycummin, Ballymeeny, Ballymeeny (Armstrong), Ballymeeny (or Hillas or Carrownabinna), Ballymeeny (Jones), Booakaun (Browne), Bookaun (Tottenham), Bunowna, Caltragh, Carrowmacbryan, Carrownrod, Carrownrush, Carrowpadden, Castletown, Cloonagleavragh, Cloonagleavragh Park, Cooga, Curraghnagap, Easky Town, Finned, Fortland, Keadues, Killeenduff, Kilmacurkan, Lenadoon, Monereagh, Old-Grange, Owenbeg, Owenykeevaun or Tawnamaddoo, Rathlee, Rathmeel, Shannonspark East, Shannonspark West and Shraheens.

== See also ==
- List of towns and villages in Ireland.
