= Enniscrone =

Seaside town in County Sligo, Ireland

Enniscrone Inis Crabhann Inishcrone
- Town
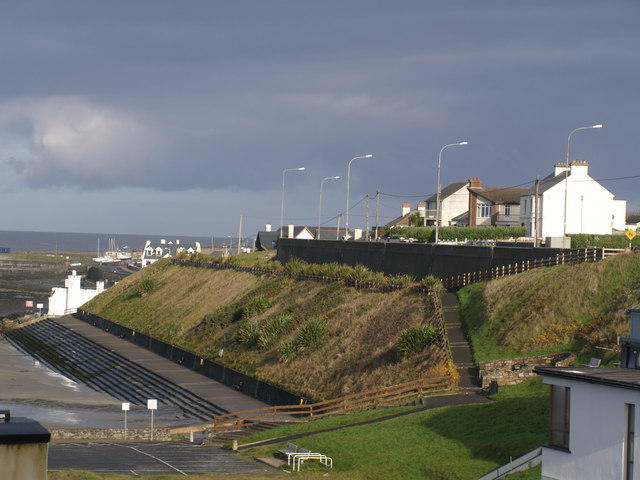
- Bathing terrace at Enniscrone

- Location in Ireland
- Coordinates: 54°12′47″N 9°05′36″W
- Country: Ireland
- Province: Connacht
- County: County Sligo

Population (2022)
  - Total: 1,291
- Time zone: UTC+0 (WET)
  - Summer (DST): UTC-1 (IST (WEST))
- Irish Grid Reference: G286298

Enniscrone – also spelt Inniscrone and officially named Inishcrone (Irish: Inis Crabhann / Inis Eiscir Abhainn) – is a small seaside town in County Sligo, Ireland. Its sandy beach, tourist campsite, and golf course all attract visitors. As of the 2022 census, the town had a population of 1,291 people.

== Name ==
The majority of the local population know this village as Enniscrone, though some local school teachers and historians use the official name of "Inishcrone". Sligo County Council has neglected the official version in favour of "Enniscrone" which appears on their website, and at least one local newspaper does not use the official name. Locally, the road signs are one of the few places "Inniscrone" can be seen.

Up until the late 1970s the name "Enniscrone" was used by local teachers. It was taught as being a derivative of the Irish Inis Eascar Abhann, meaning "the island on the sandbank in the river". An entry in the Placenames Database of Ireland suggests that there is no evidence for this derivation, and notes that the name may derive from Eiscir Abhann, meaning "esker of the river".

== Geography ==
Enniscrone is in County Sligo on Ireland's Atlantic coast, overlooking Killala Bay, 12 km north of Ballina. The R297 regional road passes through the town.

The area around Enniscrone includes the townlands of Muckduff, Lacken, Lacknaslevia, Frankford, Carrowhubbock North and Carrowhubbock South. Carrowhubbock South townland (from Irish Ceathrú Hobac, meaning 'Hobuck's Quarter') is approximately 2.3 square kilometres (0.9 sq mi) in area and spans much of the centre and north of the town. Residential development plans in this part of Enniscrone met community opposition in 2007.

== History ==
Evidence of ancient settlement in the area includes a number of ringfort sites in the townlands of Muckduff, Frankford, and Carrowhubbock North and South. The ruins of a fortified house, known as Inishcrone Castle and built c.1650, lie just north of the town centre. The local Church of Ireland church was built c.1829, and a Roman Catholic church followed in 1892. The latter remained in use by the local Catholic congregation until a new church was built in 1965.

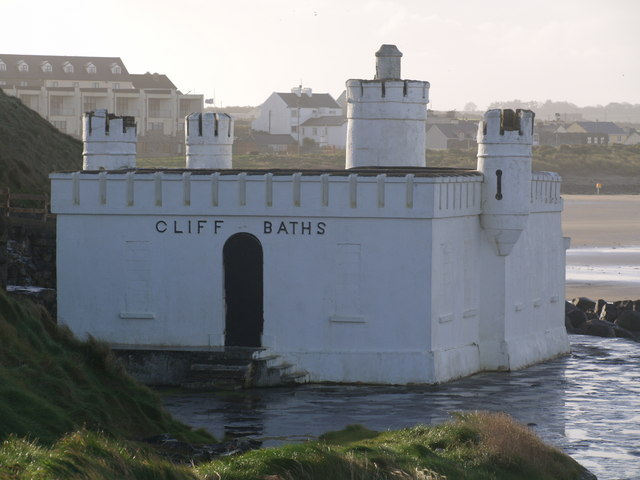
The "cliff baths", built c. 1890

In A Topographical Dictionary of Ireland, published by Samuel Lewis in 1837, Enniscrone is described as having "a coast-guard station [..and..] constabulary police station". This coast-guard station was destroyed in August 1920 following an IRA attack during the Irish War of Independence. There were no casualties in the attack, in which a small garrison of British Royal Marines were forced to surrender the building, arms and ammunition.

Reflecting the town's development as a seaside resort, a number of bathhouses were built in the town in the late 19th century and early 20th century.

== Amenities ==
Amenities in the area include a number of shops, pubs, restaurants, holiday accommodation and a pitch and putt course. The local primary school is a co-educational Catholic national school, which had an enrollment of over 120 pupils as of 2020. The local Kilglass/Enniscrone Soccer Club play their home games at Michael McGowan Park.

As of 2018, local man David McGowan had begun construction of a "glamping" village, with the main focus being the Boeing 767 he bought to convert into accommodation.

== Beach ==
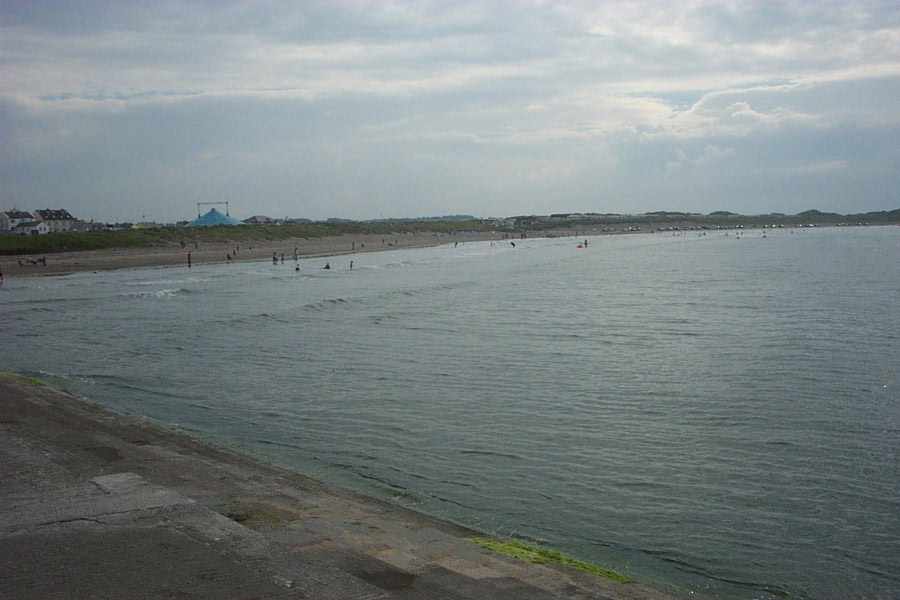
The beach at Enniscrone strand

Enniscrone's public sandy beach stretches over a long area of shoreline, and is split near the lower part of the village by a small crossable river. Part of the beach is overseen by lifeguards in the summer period.

The "Valley of Diamonds" is one of the hidden features along the beach, and is the largest of the "volcano-like" compositions among the long-grassed sand dunes. Sligo County Council fenced off the sand dunes as part of their "Dune Restoration Works Programme". Other county council restrictions include limiting road access to the beach, a measure taken to maintain Enniscrone's Blue Flag beach status.

== See also ==
- List of towns and villages in Ireland
