= European Writers' Council =

The European Writers' Council (EWC, the European Writers' Congress until 2010) is a federation of authors' associations. It represents over 150,000 writers and translators in 60 associations in 34 European countries. It is recognised by the European Union, UNESCO, and WIPO.

Until 2022, the organization was involved in the awarding of the European Union Prize for Literature.

== History ==
The EWC was founded in 1977 as the European Writers' Congress, being led in a decentralised manner during the first few decades. In 2006 it was re-created as an international non-profit association under Belgian law with a seat in Brussels, to be renamed European Writers' Council in 2010.
