= Brackwanshagh =

Townland in County Mayo, Ireland

Coordinates: 54°01′54″N 9°13′39″W

Brackwanshagh (Irish: Breacbháinseach) is a townland within the parish of Kilbelfad and the historic barony of Tirawley in County Mayo, Ireland. It borders Lisduvoge, Carrowgarve, Carrowvaneen, Ballyhanruck and Rinmore townlands. As of 2011, Brackwanshagh had 58 residents in 20 occupied houses.
