= Lissaniska West, County Mayo =

Townland near the village of Foxford, County Mayo

- Townland
- Interactive map of Lissaniska West, County Mayo
- Coordinates: 54°01′17″N 9°09′29″W
- Country: Ireland
- Parish: Ballynahaglish

Lissaniska West (Irish: Lios an Uisce Thiar) is a townland in the parish of Ballynahaglish and the historical barony of Tirawley, County Mayo. The townland is north of the town of Foxford, the townland of Lissaniska East, south of the town of Ballina and the population had 81 people in 23 dwellings within the townland.
