= Rathnamagh =

Townland in County Mayo, Ireland

Rathnamagh (Irish: Ráth na Mach) is a townland within the civil parish of Kilfian and the historic barony of Tirawley, County Mayo in Ireland. It borders Ballyneety, Lauvlyer, Rathmoyle, Greenwoodpark, Treangarrow to east, Fairfield and Woodville to west and Carrowgarve North to the south. As of 2011, the townland had a population of 64 people (in 25 dwellings). The local national (primary) school, Rathnamagh National School, had an enrolment of 12 pupils in 2024.
