= Forrew =

Townland in County Mayo, Ireland

Forrew (Irish: Foithriú) is a townland in the civil parish of Moygownagh and historical barony of Tirawley, County Mayo, Ireland. The townland, which is approximately 1.1 square miles (2.8 km^{2}) in area, had a population of 7 people (in 3 houses) as of the 2011 census. Forrew Bog, a natural heritage peatland, is partially within the townland.
