= R314 road (Ireland) =

Regional road in County Mayo in Ireland

R314 road
- Bóthar R314
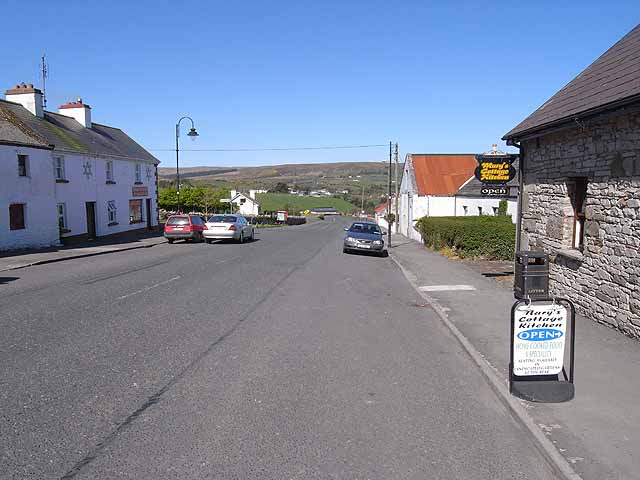
- Main Street, Ballycastle, on the R314

Route information
- Length: 69.9 km (43.4 mi)

Location
- Country: Ireland
- Primary destinations: County Mayo; Atticonaun (R313); Crosses the Glenamoy River; Glenamoy; Crosses the Belderg River; Belderg; Crosses the Glenglassera River; Crosses the Owenbehy River; Crosses the Glenulra River; Crosses the Bellanaminnaun River; Crosses the Ballinglen River; Ballycastle (R315); Crosses the Heathfield River; Crosses the Carn River; Crosses the Cloonaghmore River; Killala; Crosses the Rosserk River; Ballina (N59, N26)

Highway system
- Roads in Ireland; Motorways; Primary; Secondary; Regional

The R314 road is a regional road in County Mayo in Ireland. It connects the R313 road at Atticonaun to the N59 road in Ballina, 69.9 kilometres (43.4 mi) away (map).

The government legislation that defines the R314, the Roads Act 1993 (Classification of Regional Roads) Order 2012 (Statutory Instrument 54 of 2012), provides the following official description:

Béal an Mhuirthead — Ballycastle — Ballina, County Mayo

Between its junction with the R313 at Áit Tí Conain in the county of Mayo and its junction with N59 at Circular Road in the town of Ballina via Moing Eiriún, Gleann na Muaidhe, Béal Deirg, Ballycastle, Palmerstown Bridge, Killybrone; George Street, Market Street and Church Street at Killala; Meelick, Tawnaghmore Upper and Culleens in the county of Mayo: and Killala Road in the town of Ballina.

== See also ==
- List of roads of County Mayo
- National primary road
- National secondary road
- Regional road
- Roads in Ireland
