= Moygownagh =

Civil parish in County Mayo, Ireland

Moygownagh Maigh Ghamhnach
- Civil parish
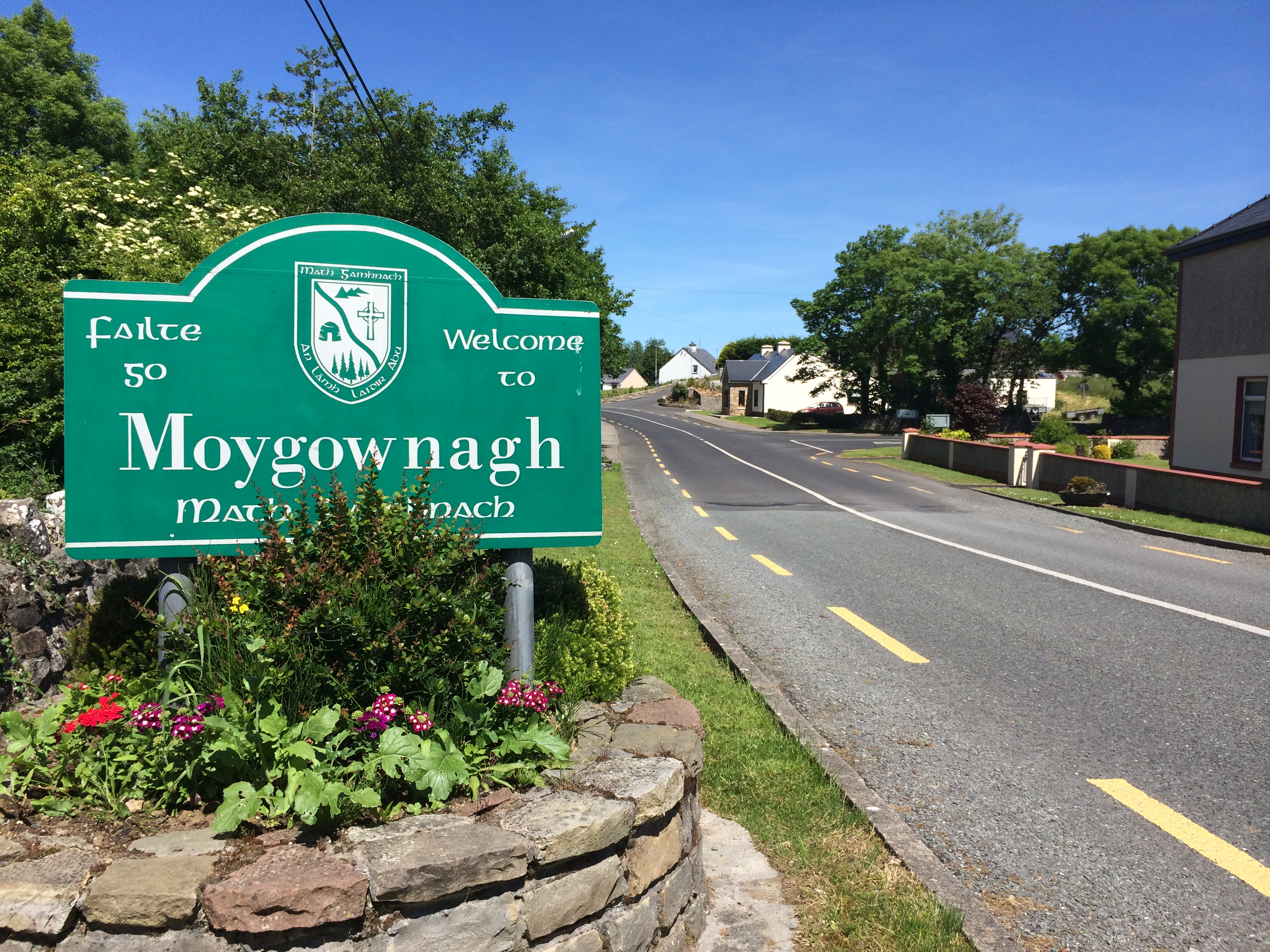
- Sign in Moygownagh

- Location in Ireland
- Coordinates: 54°09′40″N 9°20′45″W
- Country: Ireland
- Province: Connacht
- County: County Mayo
- Irish Grid Reference: G121244

Moygownagh or Moygawnagh (Irish: Maigh Ghamhnach, meaning 'plain of the cows or calves') is a civil parish and village in the historical barony of Tyrawley, County Mayo, Ireland. Moygownagh borders the parishes of Kilfian and Crossmolina.

The parish is on the R315 Crossmolina to Ballycastle road. The local community centre acts as a meeting place and sporting venue in the area.

== History ==
According to folklore, the parish was named by St. Cormac in the 5th or 6th century. According to the legend, while on a journey in the area, St. Cormac met St. Daria, who was the abbess of a nunnery there. She received him so hospitably that on his departure, he blessed her and her place of habitation and prayed that the area would abound in cows and herds. His prayers were answered, and from then on, the place was known as Mag Gamhnach (Moygownagh), meaning 'plain of the cows with calves'.

Although there is no monument in the parish erected in to St. Daria, St. Cormac gives his name to the church. It is thought that St. Daire's convent was situated where the old cemetery now stands.

In ancient times, Moygownagh, most of Kilfian and a small part of Crossmolina formed the territory known as Bredach.

There was a Protestant church near Garranard Post Office, which itself was the parson's residence. The stones remaining in the old Protestant church were used in the foundation of the present parochial house. The present church was built in 1846 by Father James McNamera in Ardvarney townland.

In Samuel Lewis's Topographical Dictionary of Ireland, published in 1837, the area is described as:

MAGANAUGH, or MOYGOWNAGH, a parish, in the barony of Tyrawley, county of Mayo, and province of Connaught, 7 miles (S.W.) from Killala, on the road from Crossmolina to Ballycastle; containing 1,981 inhabitants. This parish is situated on the river Awenmore, and comprises 4100 statute acres; the land is light, chiefly under tillage, with some pasture, and great quantities of bog and mountain; limestone abounds.

The principal seats are Belleville, the residence of Capt. W. Orme; Glenmore, of W. Orme, Esq.; and Stonehall, of T. Knox, Esq. It is a vicarage, in the diocese of Killala, forming part of the union of Crossmolina; the rectory is partly appropriate to the precentorship of Killala, and partly to the vicars choral of Christchurch, Dublin. The tithes amount to £110, of which £35.10 is payable to the vicars choral, £19.10 to the precentor, and £55 to the vicar. The R.C. parish is co-extensive with that of the Established Church; the chapel is small and in bad repair. About 70 children are educated in a public and about 10 in a private school.

== Amenities ==
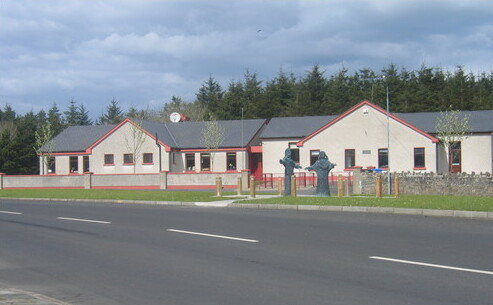
Carn National School

There is a petrol station, pub and convenience store (Mitchell's) in Moygownagh village. The local primary school, known as Cormaic Naofa or Carn National School, had an enrollment of 39 pupils as of 2024. The Catholic church in Moygownagh, also dedicated to Saint Cormac, is in the Roman Catholic Diocese of Killala.

== Built heritage ==
=== Parish church ===
Samuel Lewis, writing in the 1830s, spoke of the "R.C. Chapel in Magaunagh" as being "small and in bad repair". This church stood on the roadside about halfway between the present church gate and Mitchells shop. A holy water stoup belonging to this church was preserved beside it for many years.

The present church was built in 1846, and it is situated in Ardvarney townland. The Griffith Valuation (1856) records that the "R.C. chapel and yard" were leased from Andrew Brown, being 5 roods in area and having a valuation of £15-15-0, but exempt from taxes or rates.

There was a stone placed over the entrance of the church which bore the following inscription: "This is the house of God and Gate of Heaven. Erected to the greater glory of God, A.D. 1846". After a porch was erected about 1937, this stone became hidden from view. It was removed in 1973 and inserted in the wall near the priests' graves. Extensive reconstruction and alteration works were also carried out at this time by Fr. Michael Gilroy. The reason for the porch being erected in 1937 was that the door faced the prevailing wind, and around that time, a severe storm blew in the door and damaged the roof.

There is a relatively new graveyard behind Moygownagh church. The old Moygownagh cemetery is about half a mile southwest of Moygownagh town. The short driveway to the cemetery is on the west side of the Crossmolina road behind iron gates.

=== Estate houses ===
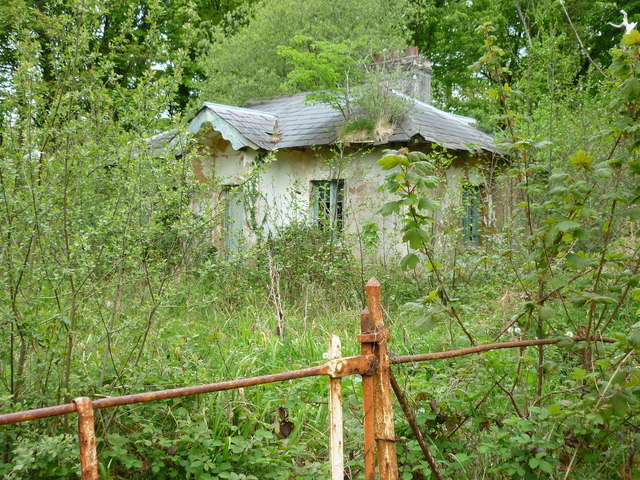
Former gamekeepers' cottage, in Garranard townland, between Glenmore House and the Owenmore Estate

Large country houses in the area include Glenmore House and Owenmore (or Millbrook), which are historically associated with members of the extended Orme family.

Glenmore House, in Attishane townland in the parish of Moygownagh, was known locally as the 'Big House' or the 'Landlords house'. It was built in 1790 and was originally associated with the Orme family. In 1853, the house and lands were purchased by the Fetherstonhaugh family. This family, which included Godfrey Fetherstonhaugh (MP for North Fermanagh from 1906 to 1916), remained as landlords until 1930.

In the 1930s, the Land Commission allotted much of the estate's land to the tenants. Major Aldridge bought the house and the remaining lands (approximately 215 acres (0.87 km^{2})) in the early 1930s. When Major Aldridge sold the estate, he moved to Mount Falcon, near Ballina. He was interested in local history, and he collected information and stories for the Folklore Commission. After passing through a number of different owners, the estate was bought by Mick Loftus in 1978. Loftus owned the house and lands during his term as president of the Gaelic Athletic Association, and sold it in 1989.

== See also ==
- List of towns and villages in Ireland
