= R311 road (Ireland) =

Road in Ireland

R311 road
- Bóthar R311

Route information
- Length: 18.1 km (11.2 mi)

Location
- Country: Ireland
- Primary destinations: County Mayo; Castlebar (R310); Crosses the Castlebar River; Derrycoosh (R312); Crosses the Owennabrockagh River; Logjody Bridge; Cuilmore; Crosses the Newport River; Newport (N59 road)

Highway system
- Roads in Ireland; Motorways; Primary; Secondary; Regional

The R311 road is a regional road in west central County Mayo in Ireland. It connects the R310 road at Castlebar to the N59 road at Newport, 18.1 kilometres (11.2 mi) away (map).

The government legislation that defines the R311, the Roads Act 1993 (Classification of Regional Roads) Order 2012 (Statutory Instrument 54 of 2012), provides the following official description:

Castlebar — Newport, County Mayo

Between its junction with R310 at Ellison Street in the town of Castlebar and its junction with N59 at Main Street Newport in the county of Mayo via Duke Street, Market Square (and via Shambles Street), Newtown, Newport Road and Snugborough in the town of Castlebar: Derrycoosh, Logjody Bridge, Cuilmore; and Castlebar Road at Newport in the county of Mayo.

== See also ==
- List of roads of County Mayo
- National primary road
- National secondary road
- Regional road
- Roads in Ireland
