= Lissaniska East, County Mayo =

Townland in County Mayo, Ireland

Coordinates: 54°01′31″N 9°09′03″W

Lissaniska East or Lisaniska East (Irish: Lios an Uisce Thoir) is a tiny village and townland in the parish of Ballynahaglish and the historic barony of Tirawley, County Mayo. The townland is north of the town of Foxford, and had a population of 79 people (in 24 houses) as of the 2011 census. The local national school is Lissaniska National School.
