= Kilfian =

Kilfian Cill Aodháin
- Civil parish
- Location in Ireland
- Coordinates: 54°12′56″N 9°21′34″W
- Country: Ireland
- Province: Connacht
- County: County Mayo
- Elevation: 84 m (276 ft)
- Irish Grid Reference: G113305

Kilfian (Irish: Cill Aodháin) is a civil parish within the barony of Tirawley, County Mayo, Ireland. It is traditionally a rural community, located between the towns of Belderrig, Crossmolina, Killala and Ballycastle.

Kilfian was the birthplace of Lady Sarah Fleming (née McElroy), wife of Sir Alexander Fleming.
