= R317 road =

R317 road may refer to:

- R317 road (Ireland)
- R317 road (South Africa)
