= R312 road (Ireland) =

Road in Ireland

R312 road
- Bóthar R312

Route information
- Length: 36.5 km (22.7 mi)

Location
- Country: Ireland
- Primary destinations: County Mayo; Derrycoosh (R311); Tawnyeeny; Crosses the Owennabrocagh River; Glenisland; Beltra; R317 road; Boggy; Boghadoon; R316 road; Crosses the Boghadoon River; Crosses the Glasheens River; Crosses the Deel River; Bellacorick (N59 road)

Highway system
- Roads in Ireland; Motorways; Primary; Secondary; Regional

The R312 road is a regional road in northwest County Mayo in Ireland. It connects the R311 road at Derrycoosh to the N59 road at Bellacorick, 36.5 kilometres (22.7 mi) away (map).

The government legislation that defines the R312, the Roads Act 1993 (Classification of Regional Roads) Order 2012 (Statutory Instrument 54 of 2012), provides the following official description:

Castlebar — Bellacorick, County Mayo

Between its junction with R311 at Derrycoosh and its junction with N59 at Moneynierin via Tawnyeeny, Glenisland, Beltra, Boggy, Boghadoon, Keenagh Cross and Doiry Cross all in the county of Mayo.

== See also ==
- List of roads of County Mayo
- National primary road
- National secondary road
- Regional road
- Roads in Ireland
