= R316 road =

R316 road may refer to:

- R316 road (Ireland)
- R316 road (South Africa)
