= R315 road =

R315 road may refer to:

- R315 road (Ireland)
- R315 road (South Africa)
