= R317 road (Ireland) =

Road in Ireland

R317 road
- Bóthar R317

Route information
- Length: 13.5 km (8.4 mi)

Location
- Country: Ireland
- Primary destinations: County Mayo; Newport (N59); Knockmoyle; Crosses the Skerdagh River; Cloondaff (Glenhest); Bracklagh; Crosses the Crumpaun River; Boggy (R312)

Highway system
- Roads in Ireland; Motorways; Primary; Secondary; Regional

The R317 road is a regional road in County Mayo in Ireland. It connects the N59 at Newport to the R312 road at Boggy, 13.5 kilometres (8.4 mi) away (map of the route).

The government legislation that defines the R317, the Roads Act 1993 (Classification of Regional Roads) Order 2012 (Statutory Instrument 54 of 2012), provides the following official description:

Newport — Boggy, County Mayo

Between its junction with N59 at Georges Street Newport and its junction with R312 at Boggy via Knockmoyle and Bracklagh all in the county of Mayo.

== See also ==
- List of roads of County Mayo
- National primary road
- National secondary road
- Regional road
- Roads in Ireland
