= Michael Feeney =

Founder of the County Mayo Peace Park and Garden of Remembrance

Michael Feeney MBE
- Spouse: Mary Feeney
- Children: 2

Michael Feeney, MBE, is the founder of the County Mayo Peace Park and Garden of Remembrance. An Irish citizen he was awarded the MBE due to his services in promoting British-Irish relations by Queen Elizabeth II at a ceremony at Buckingham Palace in the Queen's New Year Honours List in 2010.

== Early and private life ==
He was born in Castlebar, County Mayo. Feeney is the founder of the County Mayo Peace Park and Garden of Remembrance. He was educated at St Patrick's school in Castlebar up to the age of 14. He worked for the local Bacon Company before moving to the Health Service Executive.

He has supported the development of soccer in Mayo and was Secretary of the Mayo League until 1986.

Feeney is married to Mary Feeney and has two children, and lives in Castlebar. He spent several years in the FCA.

== County Mayo Peace Park and Garden of Remembrance ==
The County Mayo Peace Park and Garden of Remembrance is a project to document people from County Mayo who lost their lives in both World Wars. It was officially opened by Mary McAleese, the President of Ireland in October 2008. The annual Remembrance Day Services to commemorate Mayo's World War dead began in 1999, when Feeney organised an official Remembrance mass in the Church of the Holy Rosary in Castlebar following research which showed that a significant number of County Mayo soldiers were killed in action in World War I and World War II in the uniforms of many nations.

== Pte Patrick Feeney ==
Feeney's grandfather, Patrick Feeney, of the 1st Battalion Connaught Rangers was killed in action on Thursday 22 July 1915 near Rue-Tilleroy France the day the Connaught Rangers were finally relieved after spending 16 days in the front line. Patrick Feeney was a professional soldier and served in the South Africa Campaign, he had left the British Army in 1911. At the outbreak of World War I in 1914 he was mobilised and returned to the Colours to serve with the Connaught Rangers once more. He was buried in the Royal Irish Graveyard in Laventie, France.

Feeney was awarded the MBE due to his services in promoting British-Irish relations by Queen Elizabeth II at a ceremony at Buckingham Palace in the Queen's New Year Honours List in 2010.

== Published work ==
Feeney compiled a book Remembering Mayo's Fallen Heroes. This was a collaborative work with a number of authors and was launched in September 2008.
