= R312 road =

R312 road may refer to:

- R312 road (Ireland)
- R312 road (South Africa)
