= R311 road =

R311 road may refer to:

- R311 road (Ireland)
- R311 road (South Africa)
