= R315 road (Ireland) =

Road in Ireland

R315 road
- Bóthar R315
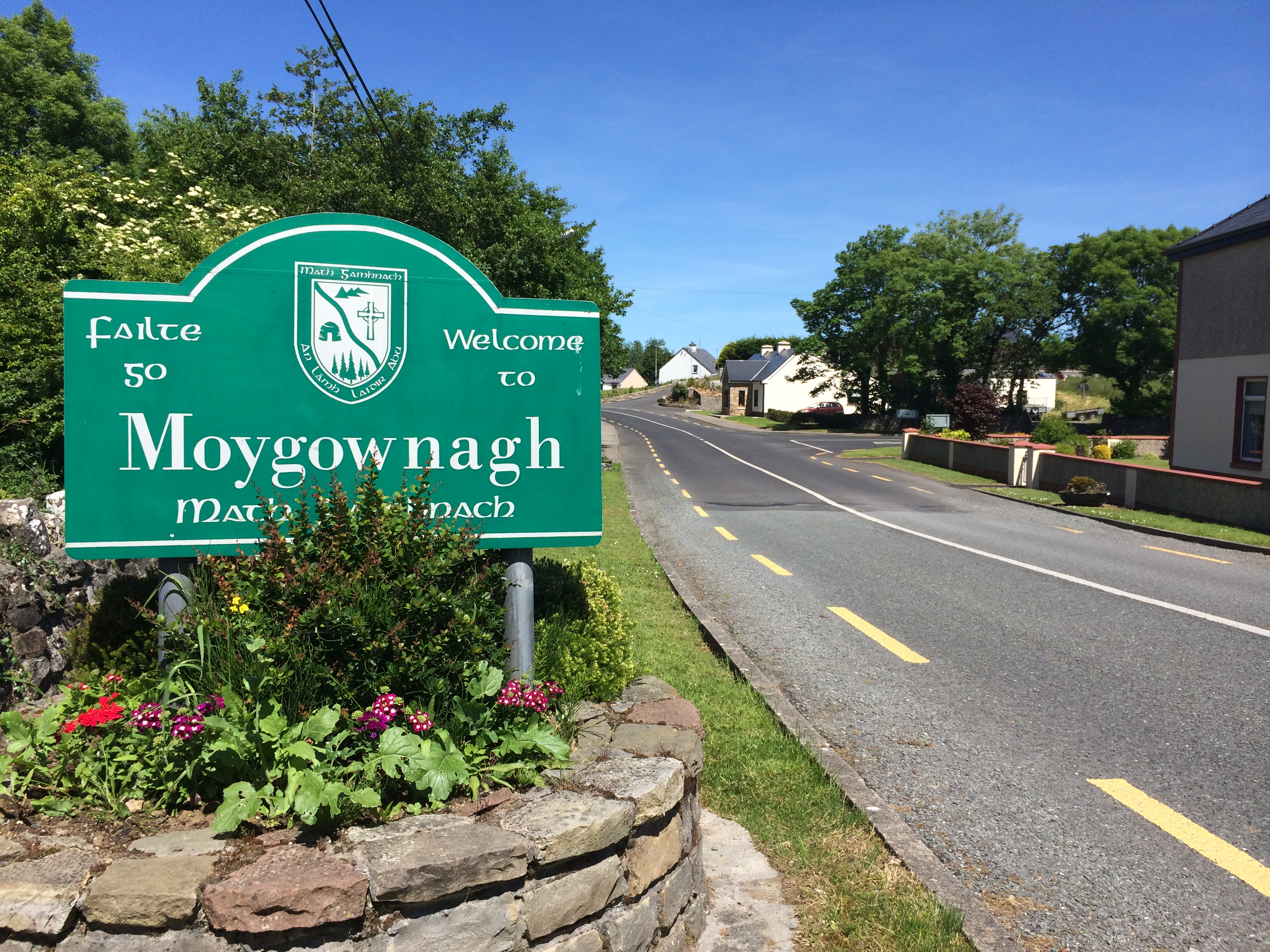
- Entering Moygownagh on the R315

Route information
- Length: 41.7 km (25.9 mi)

Location
- Country: Ireland
- Primary destinations: County Mayo; Pontoon (R310 road); Terrybaun; Crosses the Addergoole River; Lahardaun; Crosses the Castlehill River; Castlehill; Ballybrinoge (R316 road); Crossmolina (N59 road); Crosses the Deel River; Crosses the Toreen River; Moygownagh; Crosses the Owenmore River; Crosses the Duvonwen River; Garranard; Crosses the Belladooan River; Ballycastle (R314 road)

Highway system
- Roads in Ireland; Motorways; Primary; Secondary; Regional

The R315 road is a regional road in County Mayo in Ireland. It connects the R310 road at Pontoon to the R314 road at Ballycastle, 41.7 kilometres (25.9 mi) away (map of the route).

The government legislation that defines the R315, the Roads Act 1993 (Classification of Regional Roads) Order 2012 (Statutory Instrument 54 of 2012), provides the following official description:

Pontoon — Crossmolina — Ballycastle, County Mayo

Between its junction with R310 at Pontoon and its junction with N59 at Main Street Crossmolina via Terrybaun, Lahardaun, Ballybrinoge; and Mullenmore Street at Crossmolina all in the county of Mayo

and

between its junction with N59 at Erris Street Crossmolina and its junction with R314 at Ballycastle via Church Street at Crossmolina; Stonehall, Moygownagh and Ballinglen all in the county of Mayo.

== See also ==
- List of roads of County Mayo
- National primary road
- National secondary road
- Regional road
- Roads in Ireland
