= List of roads of County Mayo =

County Mayo (shaded dark green)

This is a list of national primary roads, national secondary roads, regional roads, and officially designated scenic routes in County Mayo in Ireland.

== National primary roads ==
- N5 road Longford — Westport, County Mayo
- N17 road Collooney, County Sligo — Charlestown, County Mayo — Galway
- N26 road Swinford — Ballina, County Mayo

== National secondary roads ==
- N58 road Bellavary — Foxford, County Mayo
- N59 road Belladrehid, County Sligo — Westport, County Mayo — Galway
- N60 road Roscommon — Castlebar, County Mayo
- N83 road Tuam, County Galway — Ballyhaunis — Glentavraun, County Mayo
- N84 road Galway — Castlebar, County Mayo

== Regional roads ==
- R293 road Ballynaboll, County Sligo — Ballaghaderreen, County Roscommon — Ballyhaunis, County Mayo
- R294 road Boyle, County Roscommon — Tobercurry, County Sligo — Ballina, County Mayo
- R297 road Dromore West, County Sligo — Dooyeaghvy, County Mayo
- R300 road Partry, County Mayo — An Fhairche, County Galway
- R310 road Castlebar — Rahans, County Mayo
- R311 road Castlebar — Newport, County Mayo
- R312 road Castlebar — Bellacorick, County Mayo
- R313 road Bangor — An Fod Dubh, County Mayo
- R314 road Béal an Mhuirthead — Ballycastle — Ballina, County Mayo
- R315 road Pontoon — Crossmolina — Ballycastle, County Mayo
- R316 road Bogadoon — Crossmolina, County Mayo
- R317 road Newport — Boggy, County Mayo
- R318 road Foxford — Pontoon, County Mayo
- R319 road Mallaranny — Keem, County Mayo
- R320 road Swinford — Claremorris, County Mayo
- R321 road Ballylahan — Bohola — Kiltimagh, County Mayo
- R322 road Kiltimagh — Kilkelly, County Mayo
- R323 road Kiltimagh — Knock — Ballyhaunis, County Mayo
- R324 road Balla — Kiltimagh, County Mayo
- R325 road Glentavraun, County Mayo — Cloonarragh, County Roscommon
- R327 road Cuilmore, County Mayo — Pollremon, County Galway
- R328 road Ballindine, County Mayo — Moylough, County Galway
- R329 road Knock, County Mayo (Part Old National Route 17)
- R330 road Westport — Partry, County Mayo
- R331 road Claremorris — Ballinrobe, County Mayo
- R332 road Moylough — Tuam, County Galway — Kilmaine, County Mayo
- R334 road Ballinrobe — Neale, County Mayo — Headford, County Galway
- R335 road Westport — Louisburgh — Leenane, County Mayo
- R345 road An Mám, County Galway — Neale, County Mayo
- R346 road Cong — Cross, County Mayo
- R373 road Breaffy — Castlebar, County Mayo
- R375 road Swinford — Kilkelly, County Mayo
- R376 road Lurga Upper — Knock Airport, County Mayo
- R378 road Louisburgh — Roonagh Pier, County Mayo
- R917 road Spencer Street, Castlebar, County Mayo
- R928 road Pearse Street, Ballina, County Mayo
- R929 road Main Street, Ballyhaunis, County Mayo

== Designated scenic roads ==
=== Highly scenic vistas ===
- R310 south of Lough Conn and north of Lough Cullin (looking to both lakes)
- R313 from Blacksod Point to Fallmore Bay (looking towards Blacksod Bay)
- R314 at Céide Fields (looking towards the Atlantic Ocean)
- R315 from Cuilkillew to Pontoon (looking towards Lough Conn)
- R319 from Achill to Achill Sound (looking towards Achill Sound)
- R335 from west of Kilsallagh to Westport (looking towards both Croagh Patrick and Clew Bay)
- R335 from Cregganbaun to Delphi (looking towards the Sheeffry Hills and Doo Lough)
- Local road north of Pollatomish (looking towards Broad Haven)
- Local road west of Carrowmore Lake, from Barnatra to the R313 junction (looking towards Carrowmore Lake)
- Local road at Dooyork (looking towards Blacksod Bay)
- Local road from Owenmore Bridge to Doo Lough (looking towards the Sheeffry Hills and Owenduff Lake)
- Local road from the R312 junction north of Keenagh, running to the west of Furnace Lough, to Newport (looking towards the Beg Range, Lough Feeagh and Furnace Lough)
- Local roads west of Lough Mask from Tourmakeady to Maumtrasna and from Tream to Cappanacreha (looking towards both the Partry Mountains and Lough Mask)
- Local road north-east of Lough Carra, from Carnacon to north of Ballygarries (looking towards Lough Carra)
- Local roads north-west of Lough Mask, from Cordarragh to Tourmakeady and from Croaghrimbeg to Bohaun (looking towards the Partry Mountains)

=== Scenic routes ===
- N59 from Westport to the southern boundary with County Galway
- N59 from Bangor to east of Rosturk
- R294 from west of Bunnyconellan to the boundary with Co. Sligo
- R297 from Castleconor to Crockets Town
- R312 from Derreen to Beltra Lough (along the coast, west of the Beg Mountain Range)
- R313 from Belmullet to Blacksod Point
- R314 from Belderrig to Bunatrahir Bay and from Glenamoy to Barnatra
- R315 from Lahardaun to Pontoon (west of Lough Conn)
- R319 from Mulrany to south of Bunacurry (northern part of Achill Island)
- R335 from Westport to Aasleagh
- L134 from Knockmore to north of Ross West (between Lough Conn and Lough Cullin)
- L141 from south of Bunacurry to Dooagh
- L141A around Lough Keel
- Local road around Corraun Peninsula
- Local road (i.e. "The Atlantic Drive") at Dooega Head (southern part of Achill Island), from the R319 through Dooega, Cloghmore and Derreen
- Local road from Maumtrasna to Srah (west of Lough Mask)
- Local road from Maumtrasna to Cong (south of Lough Mask)
- Local road from south of Pollatomish to Barnatra
- Local road to the west shores of Carrowmore Lake, from Barnatra to the R313 junction
- Local road from Geesala and around the peninsula
- Local road from Killsallagh to Owenmore Bridge
- Local road from Liscarney to Doo Lough
- Local road north-west of the Sheeffry Hills from Louisburgh to Kinnadooley and to Cregganbaun
- Local road from Beltra to the R315 junction at Lough Conn
- Local road from Killala to Moyne Abbey
- Local road east of Lough Conn, from Garrycloonagh to Brackwanshagh
- Local road west of Lough Conn, from the R312 junction north of Keenagh to Newport
- Local road from south of Swinford to Kilkelly
- Local road from Srahmore, running west of Furnace Lough, to Newport
- Local roads north-west of Lough Mask, from Cordarragh to Tourmakeady and from Croaghrimbeg to Bohaun
- Local road north of Achill Island, from Bunacurry to Doogort
