= R329 road (Ireland) =

Road in Ireland

R329 road
- Bóthar R329

Route information
- Length: 6.6 km (4.1 mi)

Location
- Country: Ireland
- Primary destinations: County Mayo; Shanvaghera (N17); Eden; Knock (R323); Ballyfarnagh (N17)

Highway system
- Roads in Ireland; Motorways; Primary; Secondary; Regional

The R329 road is a regional road in east central County Mayo in Ireland. It connects the N17 road at Shanvaghera – via Knock – to the N17 road at Ballyfarnagh, 6.6 kilometres (4.1 mi) away .

The government legislation that defines the R329, the Roads Act 1993 (Classification of Regional Roads) Order 2012 (Statutory Instrument 54 of 2012), provides the following official description:

R329: Knock, County Mayo (Part Old National Route 17)

Between its junction with N17 at Shanvaghera and its junction with N17 at Ballyfarnagh via Knock all in the county of Mayo.

== See also ==
- List of roads of County Mayo
- National primary road
- National secondary road
- Regional road
- Roads in Ireland
