= Lisduvoge =

Townland in County Mayo, Ireland

Lisduvoge (Irish: Lios Dubhóige) is a townland in the civil parish of Kilbelfad and the barony of Tirawley in County Mayo, Ireland. The townland is approximately 1.2 square kilometres (0.5 sq mi) in area. As of 2011, there were 76 people in 21 houses in Lisduvoge. Lough Conn Airfield, a small grass airstrip, is within the townland.
