= R316 road (Ireland) =

Road in Ireland

R316 road
- Bóthar R316

Route information
- Length: 11 km (6.8 mi)

Location
- Country: Ireland
- Primary destinations: County Mayo; Boghadoon (R312 road); Derryhillagh; Crosses the Fiddaunderreen River; Ballinloughaun; Ballybrinoge (R315 road)

Highway system
- Roads in Ireland; Motorways; Primary; Secondary; Regional

The R316 road is a regional road in County Mayo in Ireland. It connects the R312 at Boghadoon to the R315 road at Ballybrinoge near Crossmolina, 11 kilometres (6.8 mi) away (map of the route).

The government legislation that defines the R316, the Roads Act 1993 (Classification of Regional Roads) Order 2012 (Statutory Instrument 54 of 2012), provides the following official description:

Bogadoon — Crossmolina, County Mayo

Between its junction with R312 at Boghadoon and its junction with R315 at Ballybrinoge via Derryhillagh and Ballinloughaun all in the county of Mayo.

== See also ==
- List of roads of County Mayo
- National primary road
- National secondary road
- Regional road
- Roads in Ireland
