= County Mayo Peace Park and Garden of Remembrance =

Coordinates: 53.8536°N 9.3063°W

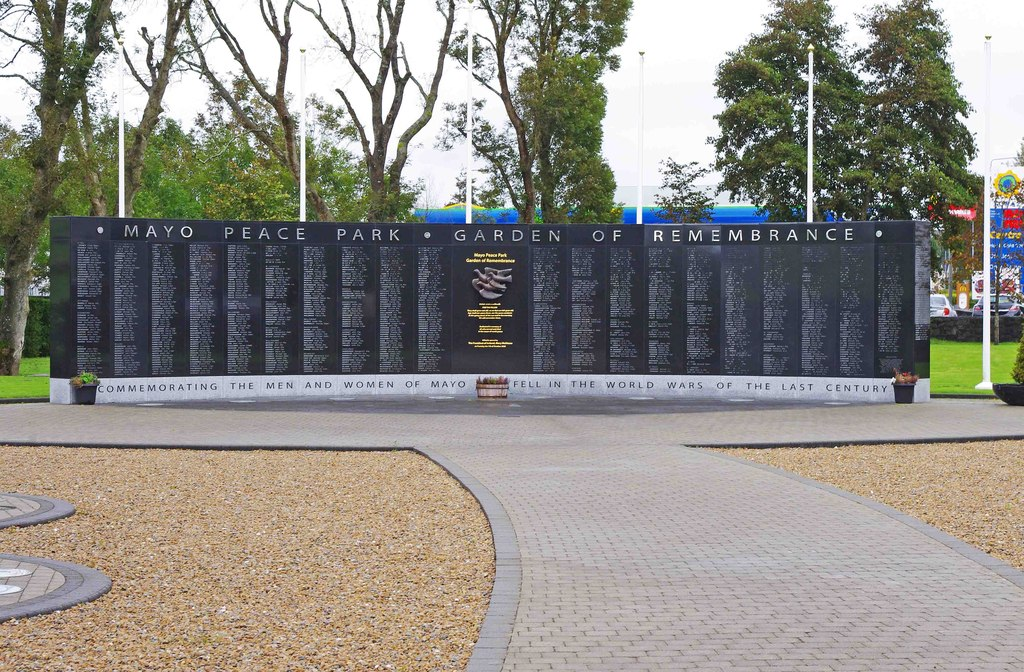
Memorial of names

The County Mayo Peace Park and Garden of Remembrance is a project to document people from County Mayo who lost their lives in both World Wars. The park is located in Castlebar, County Mayo.

== History ==
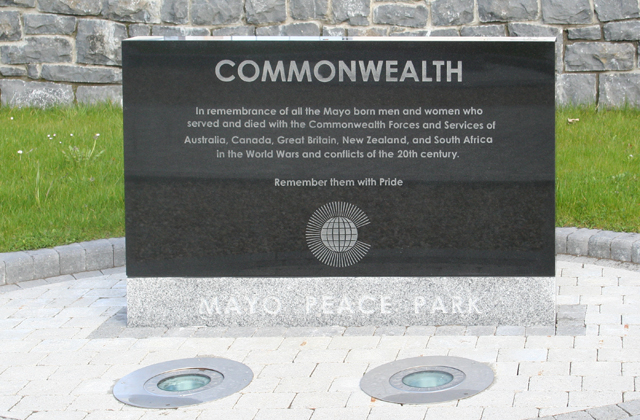
Description stone

The park was conceived by Michael Feeney. It was officially opened by Mary McAleese, the President of Ireland in October 2008. The annual Remembrance Day Services to commemorate the World War deceased began in 1999, when Feeney organised an official Remembrance mass in the Church of the Holy Rosary in Castlebar following research which showed that a significant number of County Mayo soldiers were killed in action in World War I and World War II.

== USA memorial ==
The park also contains a plaque commemorating Mayo natives that fought for the United States, including those that fought in the Korean War and Vietnam War.

== Criticism ==
The peace park has faced criticism due to the fact that it only commemorates those who fought for the British Army and not those who died in the Irish War of Independence and the Easter Rising. A commemoration to Cornelius Coughlan, a Victoria Cross recipient for services during the Indian Mutiny, was described as a "war crime commemoration" by Dr Pat Muldowney, a historian and lecturer at the University of Ulster. The Peace Park was described as "a monument to the British" by Fianna Fáil Mayo County Council group leader Al McDonnell. McDonnell further stated that "My suspicious were confirmed when they conferred an MBE on one of the park's founder members. The British saw the park as an endorsement of their colonial and military policies."

== See also ==
- Island of Ireland Peace Park, Messines, Belgium,
- Irish National War Memorial Gardens, Dublin, Ireland
- Peace Park, Dublin, Ireland
