= Ballycastle, County Mayo =

Ballycastle Baile an Chaisil
- Village
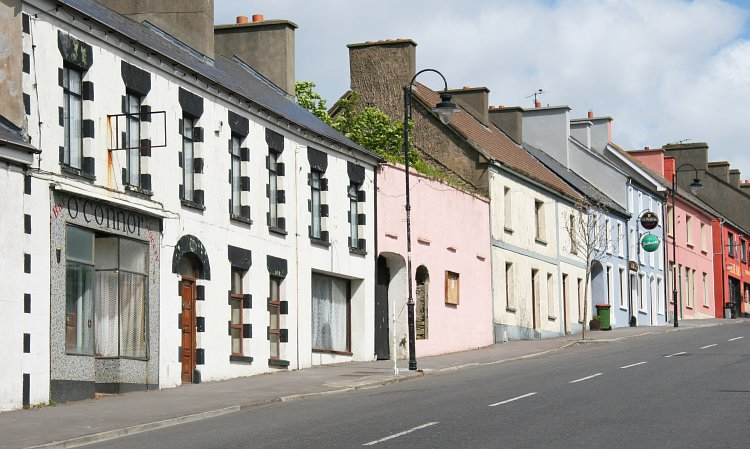
- The R314 road passing through Ballycastle

- Location in Ireland
- Coordinates: 54°16′47″N 9°22′21″W
- Country: Ireland
- Province: Connacht
- County: County Mayo
- Elevation: 78 m (256 ft)

Population (2016)
  - Total: 219
- Time zone: UTC+0 (WET)
  - Summer (DST): UTC-1 (IST (WEST))
- Irish Grid Reference: G104378

Ballycastle (Irish: Baile an Chaisil, meaning 'town of the fort') is a village in County Mayo, Ireland, situated northwest of Ballina, near Mayo's north coast. It lies on the edge of the Mayo Gaeltacht.

Ballycastle is situated on the coast of north County Mayo, with its northern boundary exposed to the Atlantic Ocean. To the west of the town are the Stags of Broadhaven, to the east lies Killala Bay while to the south are the towns of Ballina and Crossmolina.

== History ==
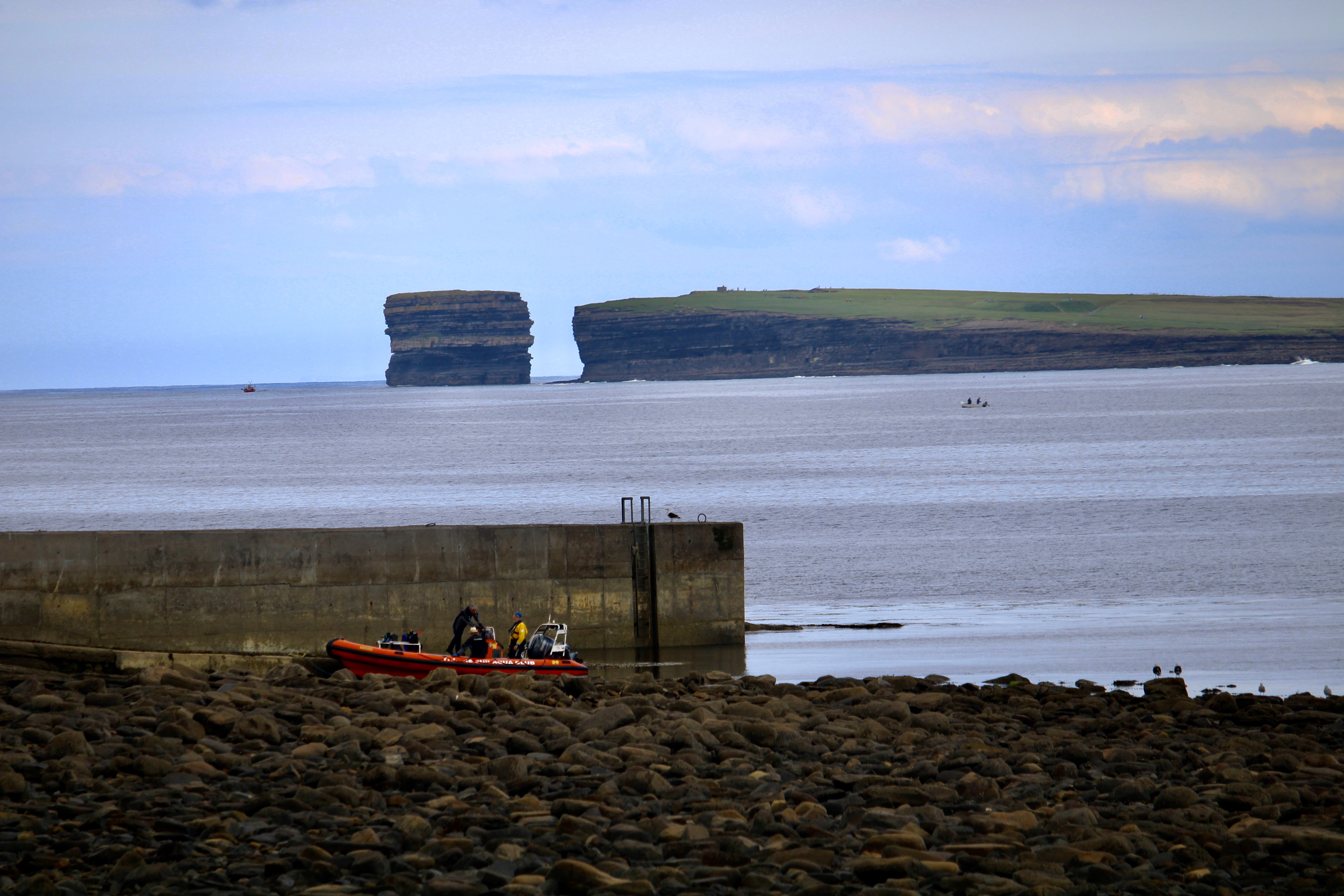
Bay look out at DownPatrick Head

The Céide Fields, approximately 7 km north of Ballycastle, was where the first settlers began to farm the slopes of the Behy/Glenurla hillside, over 5000 years ago. Two miles west of Ballycastle is the ancient, 18-foot high Doonfeeny Cross Pillar. The pillar has bird head designs and two simple Christian crosses.

The parish of Ballycastle is a combination of the two ancient parishes of Kilbride and Doonfeeney. The name Ballycastle was in use as early as 1470 and was referred to as a parish in the Catholic directory of 1836.

== Notable people ==
Notable people from Ballycastle include the Gaelic footballer Tommy Langan who won two All-Ireland Senior Football Championships for Mayo and was named on the Football Team of the Millennium.

== Transport ==
Ballycastle lies at the junction of the R314 and R315 regional roads. Bus Éireann route 445 serves Ballycastle on weekdays to Ballina via Killala.

== Events ==
Ballycastle is host to Healyfest, a music event which takes place in a pub in the village on each August Bank Holiday.

== See also ==
- List of towns and villages in Ireland
