= Tirawley =

Barony of County Mayo

Tirawley Tír Amhlaidh (Irish)
- Barony
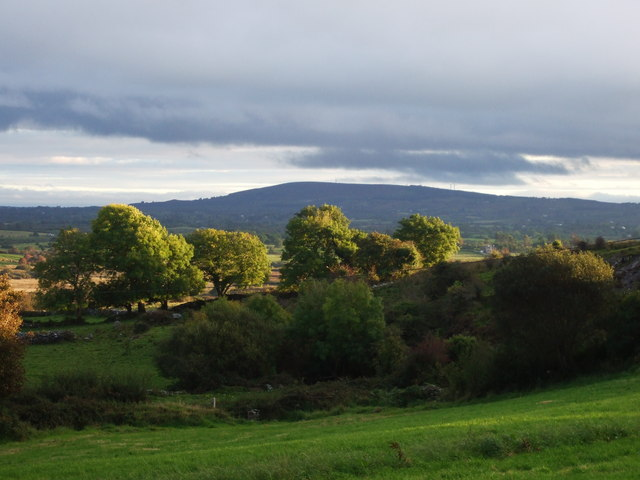
- Landscape in Cuillonaughton looking towards Slieve Carn

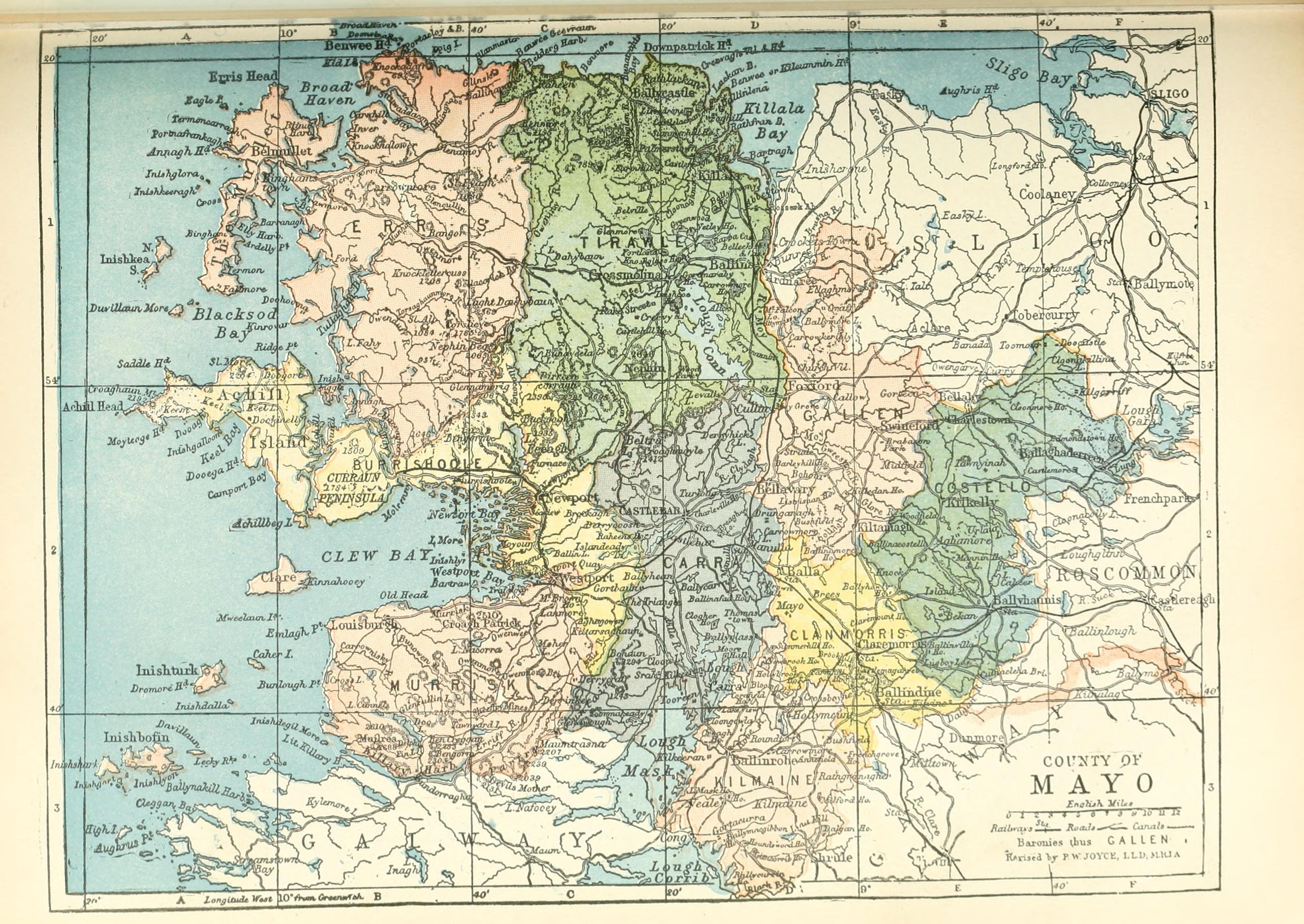
- Barony map of County Mayo, 1900; Tirawley (green) is situated in the north.

- Location within Ireland
- Coordinates: 54°10′N 9°22′W
- Sovereign state: Ireland
- Province: Connacht
- County: Mayo

Area
  - Total: 998.9 km^{2} (385.7 sq mi)

Tirawley (Irish: Tír Amhlaidh), archaically known as Tyrawley, is a barony extending southward from the north coast of County Mayo, Ireland. It was created during the shiring of County Mayo out of the Gaelic túath or territory of Tír Amhlaidh, from which it takes its name. It the second-largest barony in Ireland, nearly 1,000 km^{2} (250,000 acres) in extent. (Kilmacrenan, County Donegal is about 1/4 as large again.)

The title Baron Tyrawley was created twice, in 1706 and 1797. In the 19th century, the writer Caesar Otway (1780–1842) wrote Sketches of Erris and Tyrawley, an account of life in North Mayo just prior to the Irish Famine of 1845-1847.

Dún Briste at Downpatrick Head and the Ceide Fields are located on the north coast of the barony. The town of Killala is on its east coast, where it looks across the bay at Enniscrone, County Sligo.

The historical barony of Tirawley also includes:

- Ballina
- Moygownagh
- Killala
- Crossmolina
- Pontoon, County Mayo
- Ceide Fields
- Ballycastle
- Belderrig

== Etymology ==
The etymology of 'Tirawley' (Tír Amhlaidh) in Irish derives from its constituent parts, 'Tír' and 'Amhlaidh'. The term 'Tír' comes from Old Irish 'tír', meaning “dry land” as opposed to a lake or sea, sharing etymological roots with the English word 'thirst' and the Latin 'terra', both indicating dryness or land. 'Amhlaidh', on the other hand, is derived from Old Irish 'Amlaíb', which originates from the Old Norse name 'Óláfr'. In Irish, 'Amhlaidh' is a male given name equivalent to 'Olaf' in English. Thus, 'Tír Amhlaidh' combines these elements to mean 'Land of Olaf' in English, signifying a territory associated with or named after an individual named Olaf.

== Annalistic references ==
- U913.6. Niall son of Aed led an expedition to Connacht and inflicted a battle-rout on the warriors of the north of Connacht, i.e. on the Uí Amalgada and the men of Umall, and they left behind a very large number either dead or captured, including Mael Cluiche son of Conchobor.
- M1205.2.Donat O'Beacdha, Bishop of Tyrawley, died.
- M1206.11. Rory O'Toghda, Chief of Bredagh in Hy-Awley Tirawley, died.
- M1207.9. Cathal Carragh, son of Dermot, who was son of Teige O'Mulrony, took a great prey from Cormac, son of Tomaltagh Mac Dermot, and O'Flynn of the Cataract, but was overtaken by some of the Connacians, namely, Dermot, son of Manus, who was son of Murtough O'Conor; Cormac, son of Tomaltagh; Conor God O'Hara, Lord of Leyny; and Donough O'Dowda, Lord of Tirawley and Tireragh; and a battle ensued, in which Cathal Carragh was defeated. He was taken prisoner, and blinded; and his son, Maurice, with the son of Cugranna O'Flanagan, and many others, were killed (in the battle).
- M1460.1. The monastery of Maighin in Tirawley, in the diocese of Killala, in Connaught, was founded by Mac William Burke, at the request of Nehemias O'Donohoe, the first Irish provincial vicar of the order of St. Francis de Observantia.
- M1463.8. The son of Main Barrett, Lord of Tirawley, and Siacus Cam, the son of Farrell, Lord of the Clann-Auliffe O'Farrell, died`

== See also ==
- Baronies of Ireland
