= N59 road (Ireland) =

Road in Ireland

Coordinates: 53°46′49″N 9°31′47″W

N59 road
- Bóthar N59
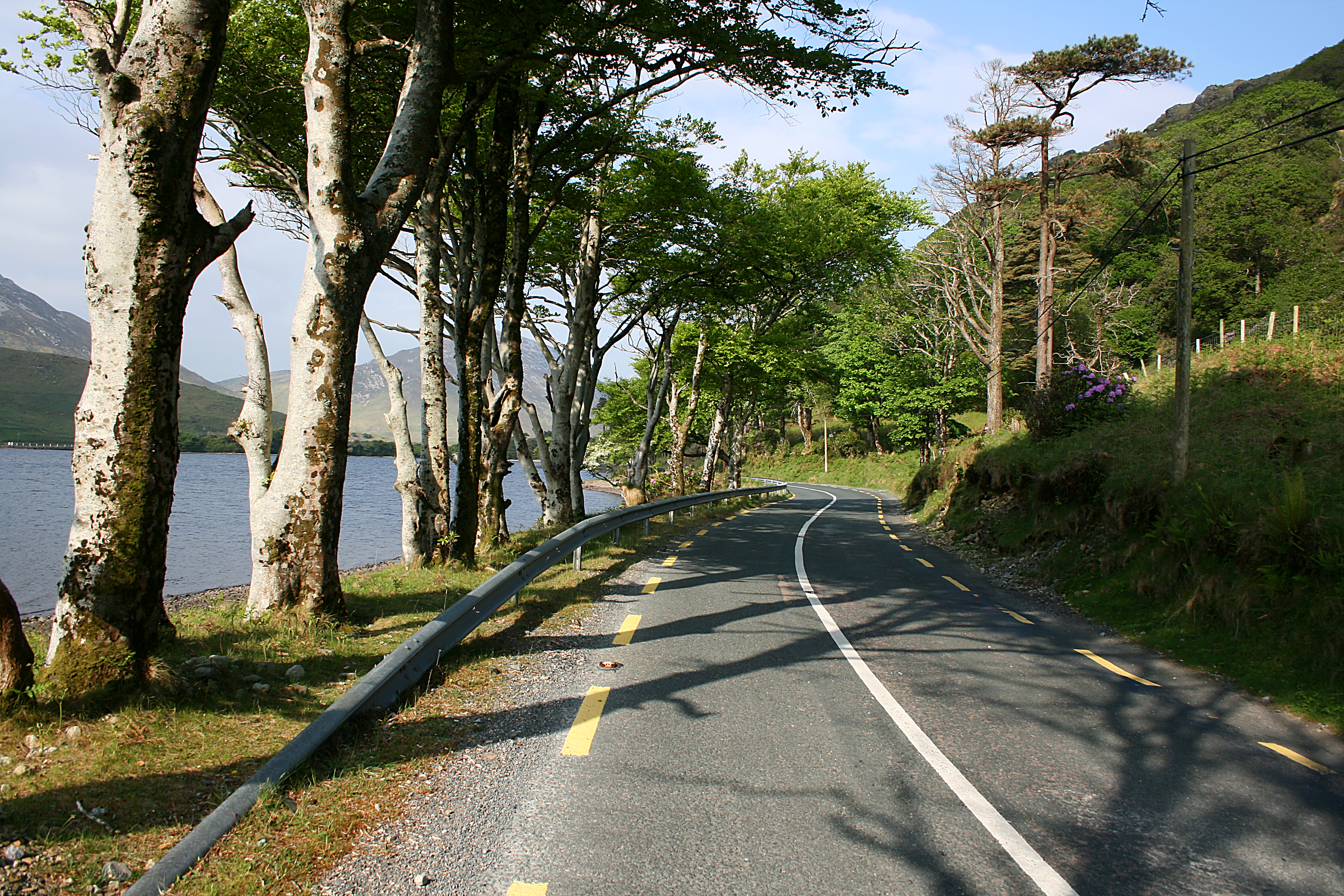
- N59 at Kylemore Lough, County Galway

Route information
- Length: 298.795 km (185.663 mi)

Location
- Country: Ireland
- Primary destinations: County Sligo; Sligo; Ballysadare; Dromore West; County Mayo; Ballina; Crossmolina; Bangor Erris; Mulranny (for Achill); Newport; Westport; County Galway; Leenaun; Letterfrack; Clifden; Recess; Maam Cross; Oughterard; Moycullen; Galway

Highway system
- Roads in Ireland; Motorways; Primary; Secondary; Regional

The N59 road is a national secondary road in Ireland. It commences in County Sligo, south of Sligo Town at the Belladrehid interchange with the N4 north of Ballysadare. The route circles around the west of Ireland, passing west from Sligo into County Mayo and through Ballina. The N59 continues around Mayo, proceeding indirectly to Westport. Continuing south through Mayo into County Galway, the road passes through the village of Leenaun. The 182-year-old bridge in the centre of the village, carrying the road across the River Lahill, collapsed in floods on 18 July 2007. Due to the local terrain and road network, the diversionary route for getting from the south of the village to Westport was 110 km long. A temporary bridge was opened eight days after the floods, on 27 July. It has since been replaced by a new bridge.

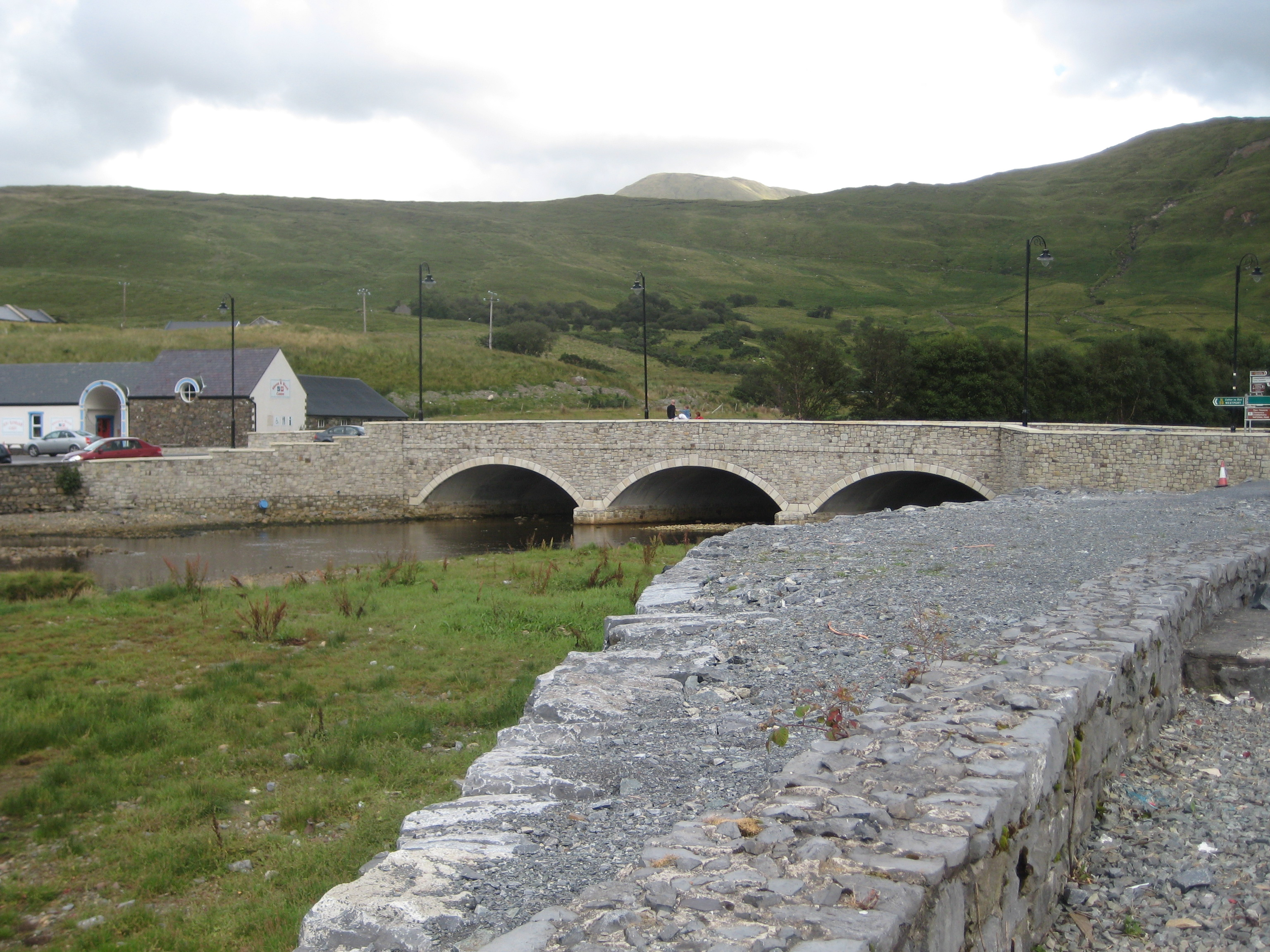
The new bridge at Leenaun in 2009.

South of Leenaun, the N59 proceeds southwest through Connemara to Clifden. From there, it returns east through Maam Cross and to Oughterard, from which it proceeds southeast to Galway city. The N59 ends at a junction with the N6 at Quincentenary Bridge.

At 298.795 kilometres (185.663 mi), the N59 is the longest numbered road in Ireland.

== Road length (2015) ==
Local Authority	Route Lengths By LA (km)
Sligo	47.641
Mayo	137.346
Galway	109.399
Galway (City)	2.669
Total Route Length	298.795

== Infrastructural upgrades ==
County Mayo Ballina Orbital Route Project The objective of the Ballina Orbital Route Project is to provide an orbital link around the town connecting all existing and future National Primary and National Secondary Roads, all existing Regional Roads and all existing Local Roads radiating from the town. The consequent benefit will be a reduction in traffic congestion due to traffic having the opportunity of avoiding the town centre. It will also serve to open up lands on the periphery of Ballina for future development. Project webpage

Ballina to Crossmolina This scheme will provide either an up-grade of the existing road or an off-line new route that will serve to bypass the town of Crossmolina on its western terminus, will link the towns of Crossmolina and Ballina and finally integrate with the preferred route for the Ballina Orbital Route on its eastern terminus. The project will be approximately 13 km long with at-grade junctions where necessary providing opportunities to interact with the existing road network.

County Galway Moycullen Bypass Project

- Galway Route Selection and Preliminary Design Complete 2001, planning granted for bypass road in 2018. Construction started on scheme in December 2021 and bypass opened to Traffic in December 2023.

== See also ==
- Roads in Ireland
- Motorways in Ireland
- National primary road
- National secondary road
- Regional road
