= County Mayo =

County in Ireland

Coordinates: 53°54′N 9°15′W

County Mayo Contae Mhaigh Eo (Irish)
- County
- Coat of arms
- Nicknames: The Maritime County, The Yew County (Others)
- Motto: Dia is Muire Linn (Irish) "God and Mary be with us"
- Interactive map of County Mayo
- Country: Ireland
- Province: Connacht
- Region: Northern and Western
- Established: c. 1570
- County town: Castlebar

Government
  - Local authority: Mayo County Council
  - Dáil constituencies: Mayo
  - EP constituency: Midlands–North-West

Area
  - Total: 5,588 km^{2} (2,158 sq mi)
  - Rank: 3rd

Population (2022)
  - Total: 137,231
  - Rank: 18th
  - Density: 24.56/km^{2} (63.61/sq mi)
- Time zone: UTC±0 (WET)
  - Summer (DST): UTC+1 (IST)
- Eircode routing keys: F12, F23, F26, F28, F31, F35 (primarily)
- Telephone area codes: 093–098 (primarily)
- ISO 3166 code: IE-MO
- Vehicle index mark code: MO
- Website: Official website

County Mayo (/ˈmeɪoʊ/; from Irish Maigh Eo, Contae Mhaigh Eo, meaning 'Plain of the yew trees') is a county in Ireland. In the West of Ireland, in the province of Connacht, it is named after the village of Mayo, now generally known as Mayo Abbey. Mayo County Council is the local authority. The population was 137,231 at the 2022 census. The boundaries of the county, which was formed in 1585, reflect the Mac William Íochtar lordship at that time.

== Geography ==
It is bounded on the north and west by the Atlantic Ocean; on the south by County Galway; on the east by County Roscommon; and on the northeast by County Sligo. Mayo is the third-largest of Ireland's 32 counties in area and 18th largest in terms of population. It is the second-largest of Connacht's five counties in both size and population. Mayo has 1,168 km (726 mi) of coastline, or approximately 21% of the total coastline of the State. It is one of three counties which claims to have the longest coastline in Ireland, alongside Cork and Donegal. There is a distinct geological difference between the west and the east of the county. The west consists largely of poor subsoils and is covered with large areas of extensive Atlantic blanket bog, whereas the east is largely a limestone landscape. Agricultural land is therefore more productive in the east than in the west. Clew Bay lies on the west coast of the county.

- The highest point in Mayo (and Connacht) is Mweelrea, at 814 m (2,671 ft)
- The River Moy in the northeast of the county is renowned for its salmon fishing
- Ireland's largest island, Achill Island, lies off Mayo's west coast
- Mayo has Ireland's highest cliffs at Croaghaun, Achill Island, while the Benwee Head cliffs in Kilcommon, Erris, drop almost perpendicularly 270 m (900 ft) into the Atlantic Ocean.
- The northwest areas of County Mayo have some of the best renewable energy resources in Europe, if not the world, in terms of wind resources, ocean wave, tidal and hydroelectric resources
Geography of County Mayo
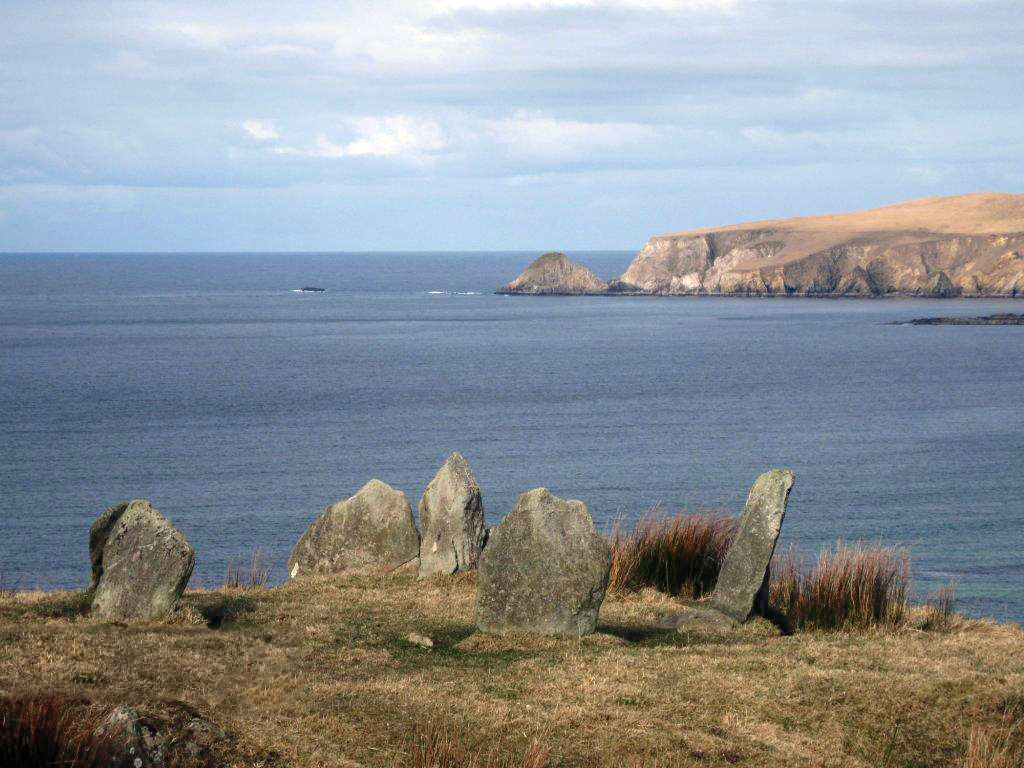
Glengad stone circle, Kilcommon, Erris

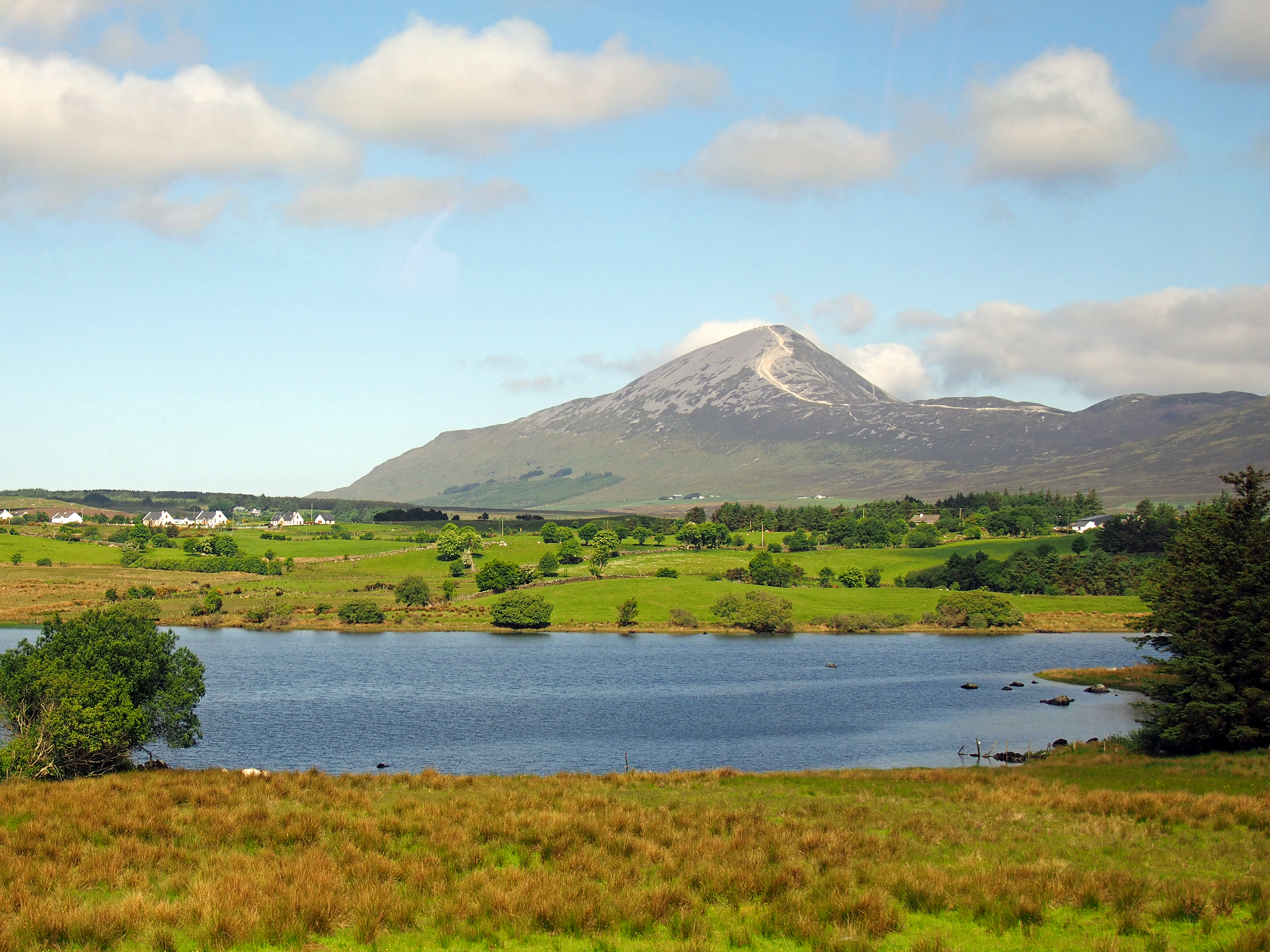
Croagh Patrick

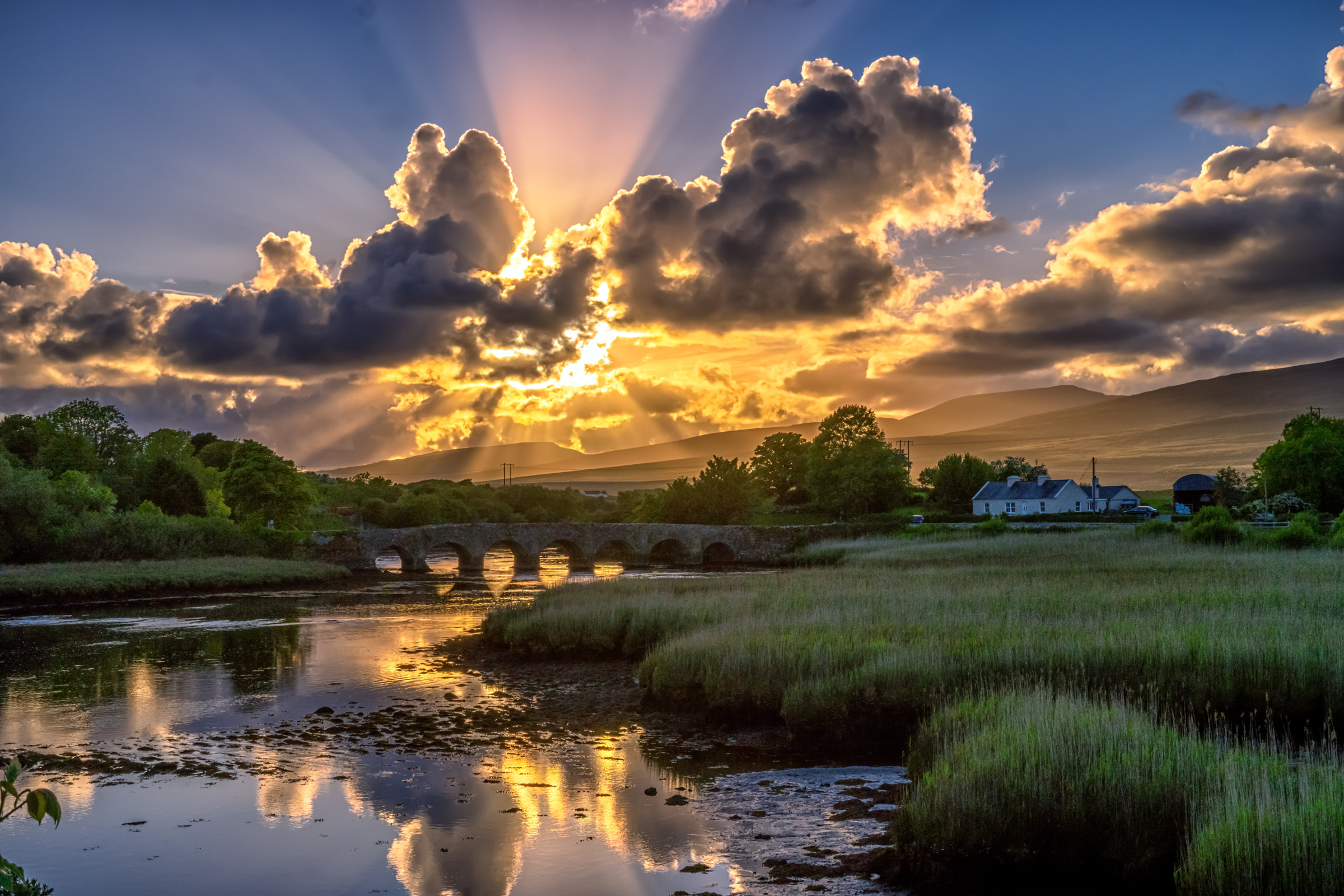
Burrishoole Bridge

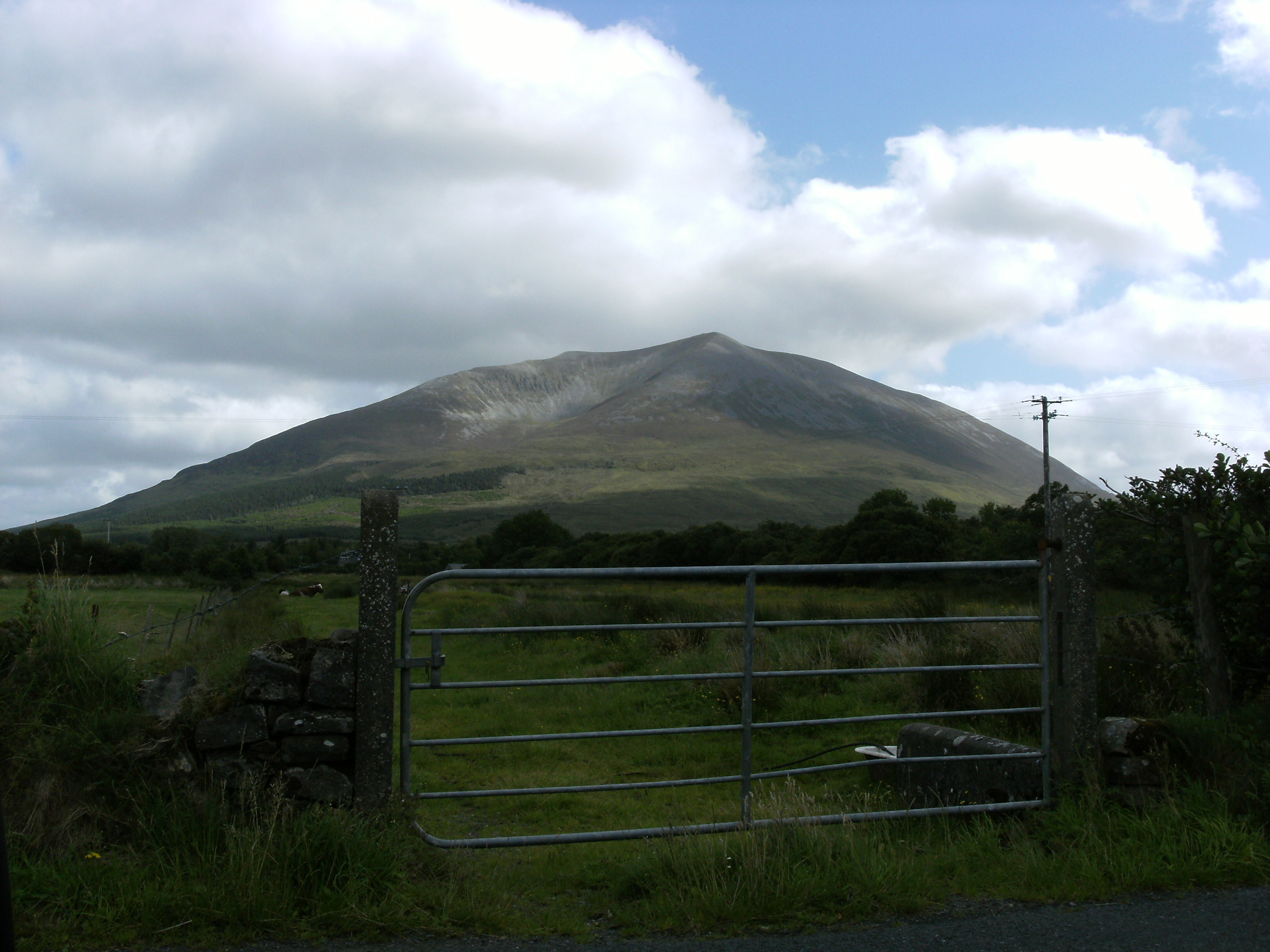
Nephin, found in central Mayo, is the largest freestanding mountain on the island of Ireland

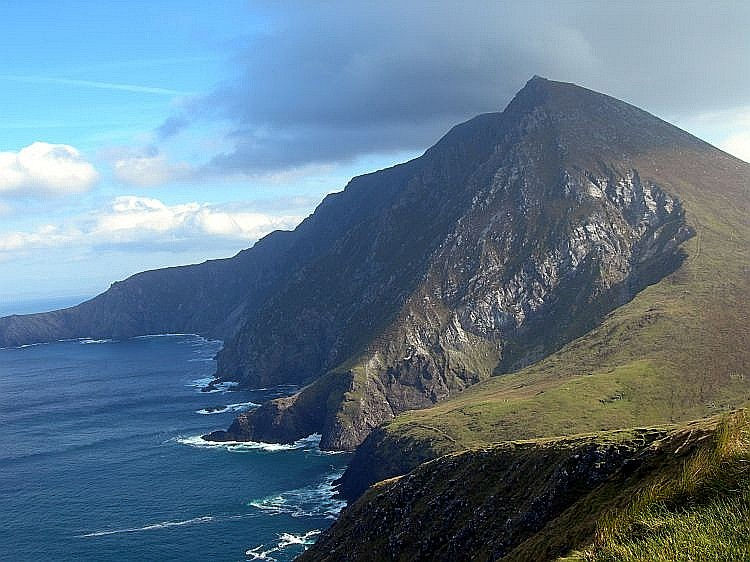
The Cliffs at Croaghaun on Achill Island are the third highest in Europe

There are nine historic baronies, four in the northern area and five in the south of the county:

North Mayo

- Erris (north-west, containing Belmullet, Gweesalia, Bangor Erris, Kilcommon, Ballycroy etc.)
- Burrishoole (west, containing Achill, Mulranny and Newport, County Mayo)
- Gallen (east, containing Bonniconlon, Foxford)
- Tyrawley (north-east, containing Ballina, Ballycastle, Killala, Moygownagh)

South Mayo

- Clanmorris, (south-east, containing Claremorris and Balla)
- Costello (east-south-east, containing Kilkelly Ballyhaunis etc.)
- Murrisk (south-west, containing Westport, Louisburgh, Croagh Patrick etc.)
- Kilmaine (south, containing Ballinrobe, Cong etc.)
- Carra (south, containing Castlebar, Partry etc.)

=== Largest towns by population ===
According to the 2022 census:

1. Castlebar 13,054
2. Ballina 10,556
3. Westport 6,872
4. Claremorris 3,857
5. Ballinrobe 3,148
6. Ballyhaunis 2,773
7. Swinford 1,459
8. Foxford 1,452
9. Kiltimagh 1,232
10. Charlestown* 1,172 (includes Bellaghy, County Sligo)

=== Flora and fauna ===
A survey of the terrestrial and freshwater algae of Clare Island was made between 1990 and 2005 and published in 2007. A record of Gunnera tinctoria is also noted.

Consultants working for the Corrib gas project have carried out extensive surveys of wildlife flora and fauna in Kilcommon Parish, Erris between 2002 and 2009. This information is published in the Corrib Gas Proposal Environmental impact statements 2009 and 2010.

== History ==
=== Prehistory ===
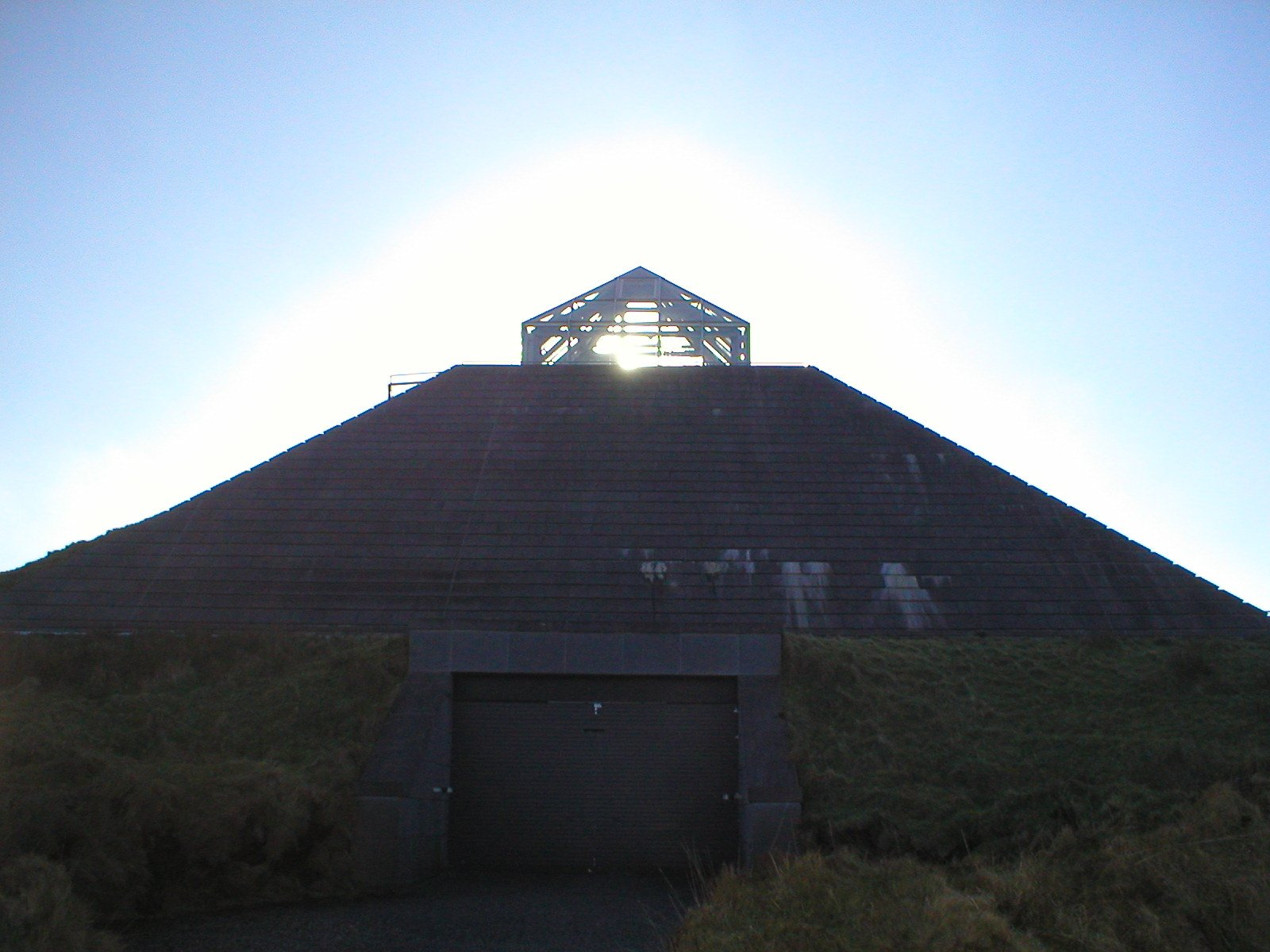
Céide Fields

There is evidence of human occupation of what is now County Mayo going far back into prehistory. At Belderrig on the north Mayo coast, there is evidence for Mesolithic (Middle Stone Age) communities around 4500 BC. while throughout the county there is a wealth of archaeological remains from the Neolithic (New Stone Age) period (ca. 4,000 BC to 2,500 BC), particularly in terms of megalithic tombs and ritual stone circles.

The first people who came to Ireland – mainly to coastal areas as the interior was heavily forested – arrived during the Middle Stone Age, as far back as eleven thousand years ago. Artefacts of hunter/gatherers are sometimes found in middens, rubbish pits around hearths where people would have rested and cooked over large open fires. Once cliffs erode, midden remains become exposed as blackened areas containing charred stones, bones, and shells. They are usually found a metre below the surface. Mesolithic people did not have major rituals associated with burial, unlike those of the Neolithic (New Stone Age) period. The Neolithic period followed the Mesolithic around 6,000 years ago. People began to farm the land, domesticate animals for food and milk, and settle in one place for longer periods. These people had skills such as making pottery, building houses from wood, weaving, and knapping (stone tool working). The first farmers cleared forestry to graze livestock and grow crops. In North Mayo, where the ground cover was fragile, thin soils washed away and blanket bog covered the land farmed by the Neolithic people.

Extensive pre-bog field systems have been discovered under the blanket bog, particularly along the North Mayo coastline in Erris and north Tyrawley at sites such as the Céide Fields, centred on the northeast coast.

The Neolithic people developed rituals associated with burying their dead; this is why they built huge, elaborate, galleried stone tombs for their dead leaders, known nowadays as megalithic tombs. There are over 160 recorded megaliths in County Mayo, such as Faulagh.

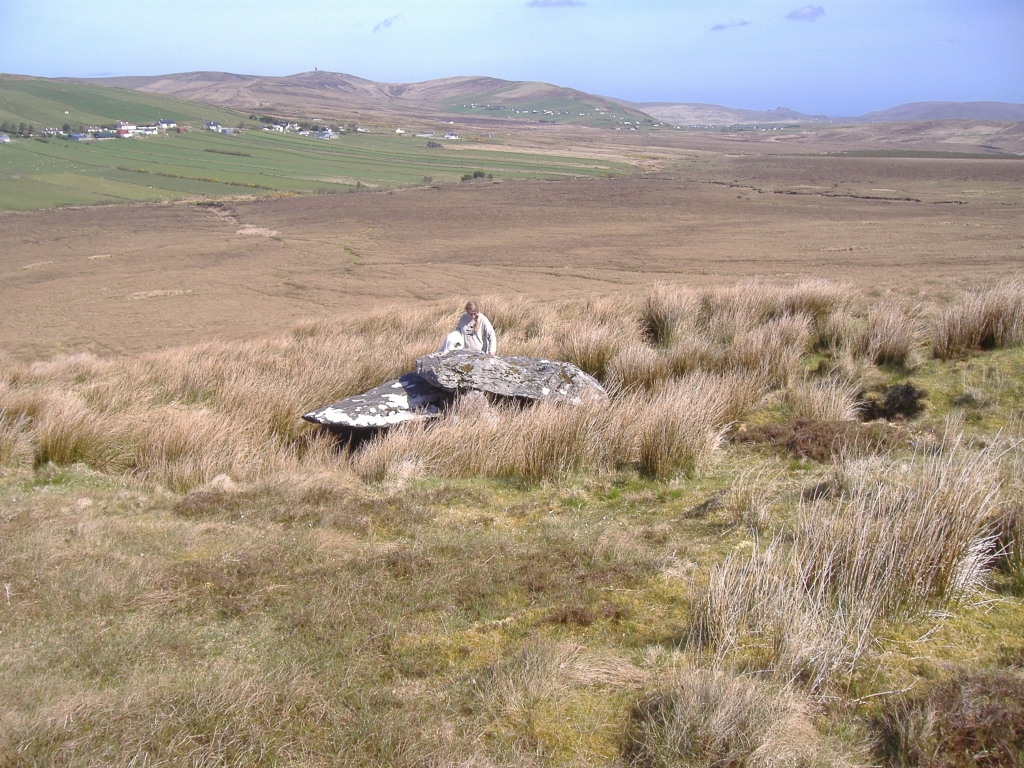
Megalithic tomb at Faulagh, Erris

=== Megalithic tombs ===
There are four distinct types of Irish megalithic tombs—court tombs, portal tombs, passage tombs and wedge tombs—examples of all of which can be found in County Mayo. Areas particularly rich in megalithic tombs include Achill, Kilcommon, Ballyhaunis, Moygownagh, Killala and the Behy/Glenurla area around the Céide Fields.

=== Bronze Age (ca. 2,500 BC to 500 BC) ===
Megalithic tomb building continued into the Bronze Age when metal began to be used for tools alongside the stone tools. The Bronze Age lasted approximately from 4,500 years ago to 2,500 years ago (2,500 BC to 500 BC). Archaeological remains from this period include stone alignments, stone circles and fulachta fiadh (early cooking sites). They continued to bury their chieftains in megalithic tombs which changed design during this period, more being of the wedge tomb type and cist burials.

=== Iron Age (ca. 500 BC to AD 325) ===
Around 2,500 years ago the Iron Age took over from the Bronze Age as more and more metalworking took place. This is thought to have coincided with the arrival of Celtic speaking peoples and the introduction of the ancestor of the Irish language. Towards the end of this period, the Roman Empire was at its height in Britain but it is not thought that the Roman Empire extended into Ireland. Remains from this period, which lasted until the Early Christian period began about AD 325 (with the arrival of Saint Patrick into Ireland, as a slave) include crannógs (Lake dwellings), promontory forts, ringforts and souterrains of which there are numerous examples across the county. The Iron Age was a time of tribal warfare and kingships, each fighting neighbouring kings, vying for control of territories and taking slaves. Territories were marked by tall stone markers, Ogham stones, using the first written down words using the Ogham alphabet. The Iron Age is the time period in which the mythological tales of the Ulster Cycle and sagas took place, as well as that of the Táin Bó Flidhais, whose narrative is set in mainly in Erris.

=== Early Christian period (ca. AD 325 to AD 800) ===
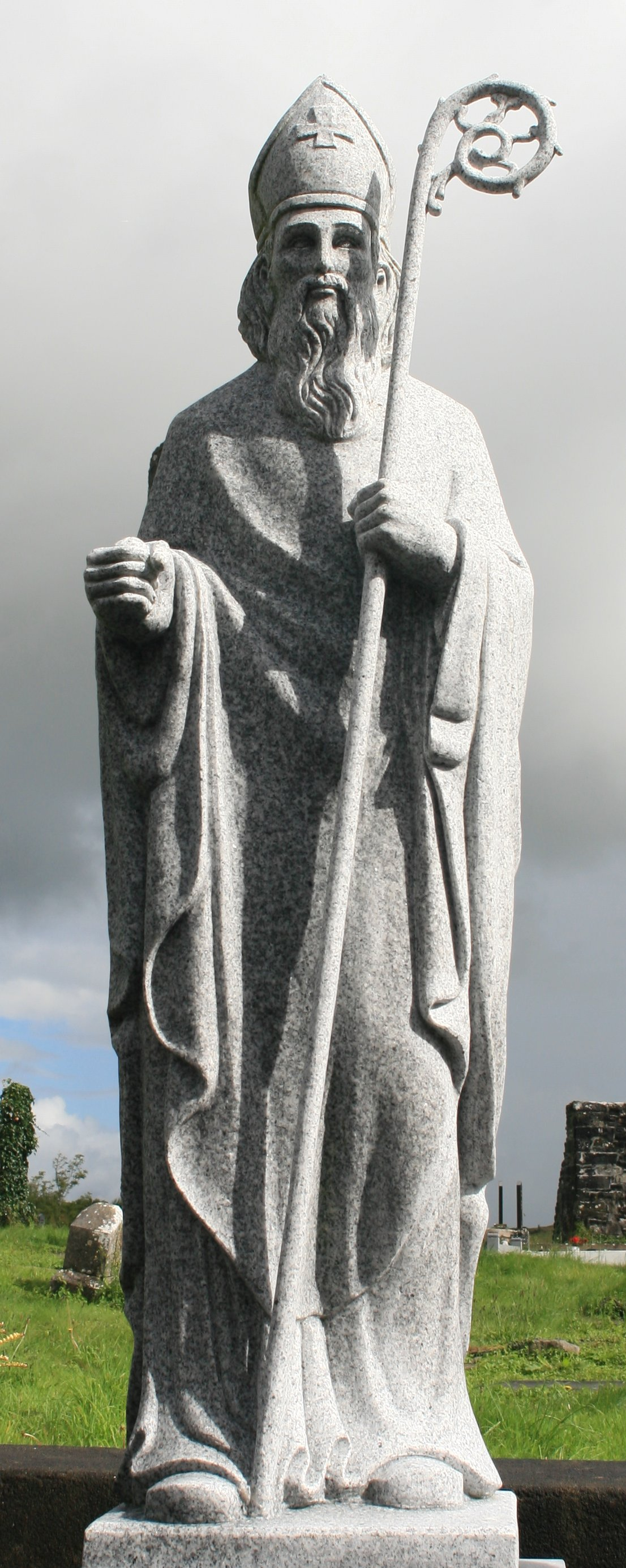
Statue of St. Patrick Aghagower

Christianity came to Ireland around the start of the 5th century. It brought many changes including the introduction of the Latin alphabet. The tribal 'tuatha' and new Christian religious settlements existed side by side. Sometimes it suited the chieftains to become part of the early Churches, other times they remained as separate entities. St. Patrick (4th century) may have spent time in County Mayo and it is believed that he spent forty days and forty nights on Croagh Patrick praying for the people of Ireland. From the middle of the 6th-century hundreds of small monastic settlements were established around the county. Some examples of well-known early monastic sites in Mayo include Mayo Abbey, Aughagower, Ballintubber, Errew Abbey, Cong Abbey, Killala, Turlough on the outskirts of Castlebar, and island settlements off the Mullet Peninsula like the Inishkea Islands, Inishglora and Duvillaun.

Beginning in 795, Vikings came from Scandinavia to raid the monasteries as they were places of wealth with precious metal working taking place in them. Some of the larger ecclesiastical settlements erected round towers to prevent their precious items from being plundered and also to show their status and strength against these pagan raiders from the north. There are round towers at Aughagower, Balla, Killala, Turlough and Meelick. The Vikings established settlements that later developed into towns (Dublin, Cork, Wexford, Waterford etc.) but none were in County Mayo. Between the reigns of Kings of Connacht Cathal mac Conchobar mac Taidg (973–1010) and Tairrdelbach Ua Conchobair (1106–1156), various tribal territories were incorporated into the kingdom of Connacht and ruled by the Siol Muirdaig dynasty, based initially at Rathcroghan in County Roscommon, and from c. 1050 at Tuam. The families of O'Malley and O'Dowd of Mayo served as admirals of the fleet of Connacht, while families such as O'Lachtnan, Mac Fhirbhisigh, and O'Cleary were ecclesiastical and bardic clans.

=== Anglo-Normans (12th to 16th centuries) ===
In AD 1169 when one of the warring kings in the east of Ireland, Dermot MacMurrough, appealed to the King of England for help in his fight with a neighbouring king, the response resulted in the Anglo-Norman colonisation of Ireland. County Mayo came under Norman control in AD 1235. Norman control meant the eclipse of many Gaelic lords and chieftains, chiefly the O'Connors of Connacht. During the 1230s, the Anglo-Normans and Welsh under Richard Mór de Burgh (c. 1194 – 1242) invaded and settled in the county, introducing new families such as Burke, Gibbons, Staunton, Prendergast, Morris, Joyce, Walsh, Barrett, Lynott, Costello, Padden and Price, Norman names are still common in County Mayo. Following the collapse of the lordship in the 1330s, all these families became estranged from the Anglo-Irish administration based in Dublin and assimilated with the Gaelic-Irish, adopting their language, religion, dress, laws, customs and culture and marrying into Irish families. They became "more Irish than the Irish themselves".

The most powerful clan to emerge during this era were the Mac William Burkes, also known as the Mac William Iochtar (see Burke Civil War 1333–1338), descended from Sir William Liath de Burgh, who defeated the Gaelic-Irish at the Second Battle of Athenry in August 1316. They were frequently at war with their cousins, Clanricarde of Galway, and in alliance with or against various factions of the O'Conor's of Siol Muiredaig and O'Kelly's of Uí Maine. The O'Donnell's of Tyrconnell regularly invaded in an attempt to secure their right to rule.

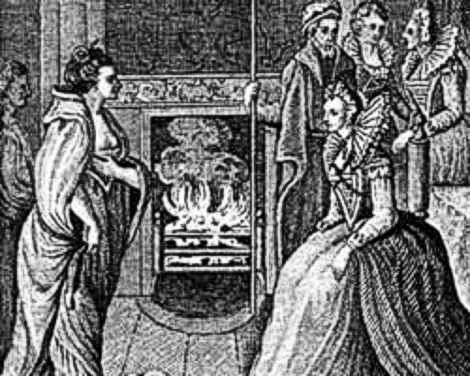
Grace O'Malley meeting Queen Elizabeth I

The Anglo-Normans encouraged and established many religious orders from continental Europe to settle in Ireland. Mendicant orders—Augustinians, Carmelites, Dominicans and Franciscans began new settlements across Ireland and built large churches, many under the patronage of prominent Gaelic families. Some of these sites include Cong, Strade, Ballintubber, Errew Abbey, Burrishoole Abbey and Mayo Abbey. During the 15th and 16th centuries, despite regular conflicts between them as England chopped and changed between religious beliefs, the Irish usually regarded the King of England as their King. When Elizabeth I came to the throne in the mid-16th century, the English people, as was customary at that time, followed the religious practices of the reigning monarch and became Protestant. Many Irish people such as Grace O'Malley, the famous pirate queen, had close relationships with the English monarchy, and the English kings and queens were welcome visitors to Irish shores. The Irish however, generally held onto their Catholic religious practices and beliefs. The early plantations of settlers in Ireland began during the reign of Queen Mary in the mid-16th century and continued throughout the long reign of Queen Elizabeth until 1603. By then the term County Mayo had come into use. In the summer of 1588, the galleons of the Spanish Armada were wrecked by storms along the west coast of Ireland. Some of the hapless Spaniards came ashore in Mayo, only to be robbed and imprisoned, and in many cases slaughtered.

Almost all the religious foundations set up by the Anglo-Normans were suppressed in the wake of the Reformation in the 16th century.

Protestant settlers from Scotland, England, and elsewhere in Ireland, settled in the County in the early 17th century. Many would be killed or forced to flee because of the 1641 Rebellion, during which a number of massacres were committed by the Catholic Gaelic Irish, most notably at Shrule in 1642. A third of the overall population was reported to have perished due to warfare, famine and plague between 1641 and 1653, with several areas remaining disturbed and frequented by Reparees into the 1670s.

=== 17th and 18th centuries ===
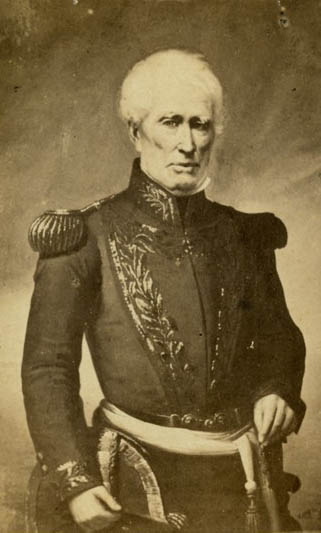
William Brown is considered to be a founding father and national hero in Argentina thanks to his efforts during the Argentine War of Independence and subsequent wars to defend the newfound nation.

Pirate Queen Grace O'Malley is probably the best-known person from County Mayo between the mid-16th century and the turn of the 17th century. In the 1640s, when Oliver Cromwell overthrew the English monarchy and set up a parliamentarian government, Ireland suffered severely. With a stern regime in absolute control needing to pay its armies and allies, the need to pay them with grants of land in Ireland led to the 'to hell or to Connaught' policies. Displaced native Irish families from other (eastern and southern mostly) parts of the country were either forced to leave the country or were awarded grants of land 'west of the Shannon' and put off their own lands in the east. The land in the west was divided and sub-divided between more and more people as huge estates were granted on the best land in the east to those who best pleased the English. Mayo does not seem to have been affected much during the Williamite War in Ireland, though many natives were outlawed and exiled.

For the vast majority of people in County Mayo the 18th century was a period of unrelieved misery. Because of the penal laws, Catholics had no hope of social advancement while they remained in their native land. Some, like William Brown (1777–1857), left Foxford with his family at the age of nine and thirty years later was an admiral in the fledgeling Argentine Navy. Today he is a national hero in that country.

The general unrest in Ireland was felt just as keenly across Mayo, and as the 19th century approached and news reached Ireland about the American War of Independence and the French Revolution, the downtrodden Irish, constantly suppressed by Government policies and decisions from Dublin and London, began to rally themselves for their own stand against British rule in their country. 1798 saw Mayo become a central part of the United Irishmen Rebellion when General Humbert from France landed in Killala with over 1,000 soldiers playing to support the main uprising. They marched across the county towards the administrative centre of Castlebar, leading to the Battle of Castlebar. Taking the garrison by surprise Humbert's army was victorious. He established a ' Republic of Connacht' with John Moore of the Moore family from Moore Hall near Partry as its head. Humbert's army marched on towards Sligo, Leitrim and Longford where they were suddenly faced with a massive British army and were forced to surrender in less than half an hour. The French soldiers were treated honourably, but for the Irish the surrender meant slaughter. Many died on the scaffold in towns like Castlebar and Claremorris, where the high sheriff for County Mayo, the Honourable Denis Browne, M.P., brother of Lord Altamont, wreaked a terrible vengeance – thus earning for himself the nickname which has survived in folk memory to the present day, 'Donnchadh an Rópa' (Denis of the Rope).

In the 18th century and early 19th century, sectarian tensions arose as evangelical Protestant missionaries sought to 'redeem the Irish poor from the errors of Popery'. One of the best known was the Rev. Edward Nangle's mission at Dugort in Achill. These too were the years of the campaign for Catholic emancipation and, later, for the abolition of the tithes, which a predominately Catholic population was forced to pay for the upkeep of the clergy of the Established (Protestant) Church.

=== 19th and 20th centuries ===
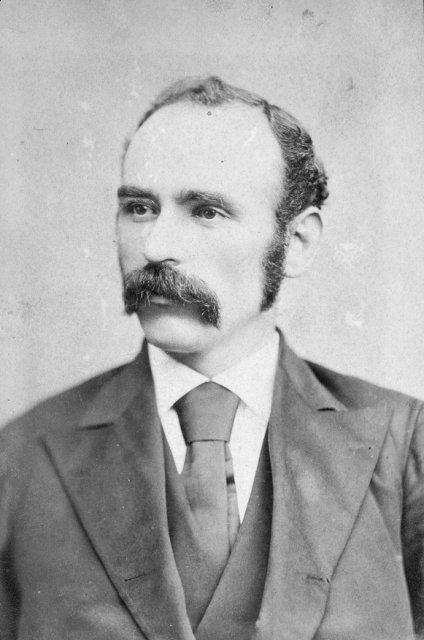
Michael Davitt spearheaded rural agrarian agitation as a leading figure in the Land League

During the early years of the 19th century, famine was a common occurrence, particularly where population pressure was a problem. The population of Ireland grew to over eight million people prior to the Irish Famine (or Great Famine) of 1845–47. The Irish people depended on the potato crop for their sustenance. Disaster struck in August 1845, when a killer fungus (later diagnosed as Phytophthora infestans) started to destroy the potato crop. When widespread famine struck, about a million people died and a further million left the country. People died in the fields of starvation and disease. The catastrophe was particularly bad in County Mayo, where nearly ninety per cent of the population depended on the potato as their staple food. By 1848, Mayo was a county of total misery and despair, with any attempts at alleviating measures in complete disarray.

There are numerous reminders of the Great Famine to be seen on the Mayo landscape: workhouse sites, famine graves, sites of soup kitchens, deserted homes and villages and even traces of undug 'lazy-beds' in fields on the sides of hills. Many roads and lanes were built as famine relief measures. There were nine workhouses in the county: Ballina, Ballinrobe, Belmullet, Castlebar, Claremorris, Killala, Newport, Swinford and Westport.

A small poverty-stricken place called Knock, County Mayo, made headlines when it was announced that an apparition of the Blessed Virgin Mary, St. Joseph and St. John had taken place there on 21 August 1879, witnessed by fifteen local people.

A national movement was initiated in County Mayo during 1879 by Michael Davitt, James Daly, and others, which brought about a major social change in Ireland. Michael Davitt, a labourer whose family had moved to England joined forces with Charles Stewart Parnell to win back the land for the people from the landlords and stop evictions for non-payment of rents. The organisation became known as the Irish National Land League, and its struggle to win rights for poor farmers in Ireland was known as the Land War.

It was in this era of agrarian unrest that a new verb was introduced to the English language by Mayo – "to boycott". Charles Boycott was an English landlord deeply unpopular with his tenants. When Charles Steward Parnell made a speech in Ennis, County Clare, urging nonviolent resistance against landlords, his tactics were enthusiastically taken in Mayo against Boycott. The entire Catholic community around Lough Mask in South Mayo where Boycott had his estate became a campaign of total social ostracisation against Boycott, a tactic that would one day come to bear his name. The campaign against Boycott became a cause célèbre in the British press after he wrote a letter to The Times. The British elite rallied to his cause and Fifty Orangemen from County Cavan and County Monaghan travelled to his estate to harvest the crops, while a regiment of the 19th Royal Hussars and more than 1,000 men of the Royal Irish Constabulary were deployed to protect the harvesters. However, the cost of doing this was completely uneconomic; it cost the British government somewhere in the region of £10,000 to simply harvest £500 worth of crops. Boycott sold off the estate and the British government's resolve to try to break boycotts in this completely dissolved, resulting in victory for the tenants.

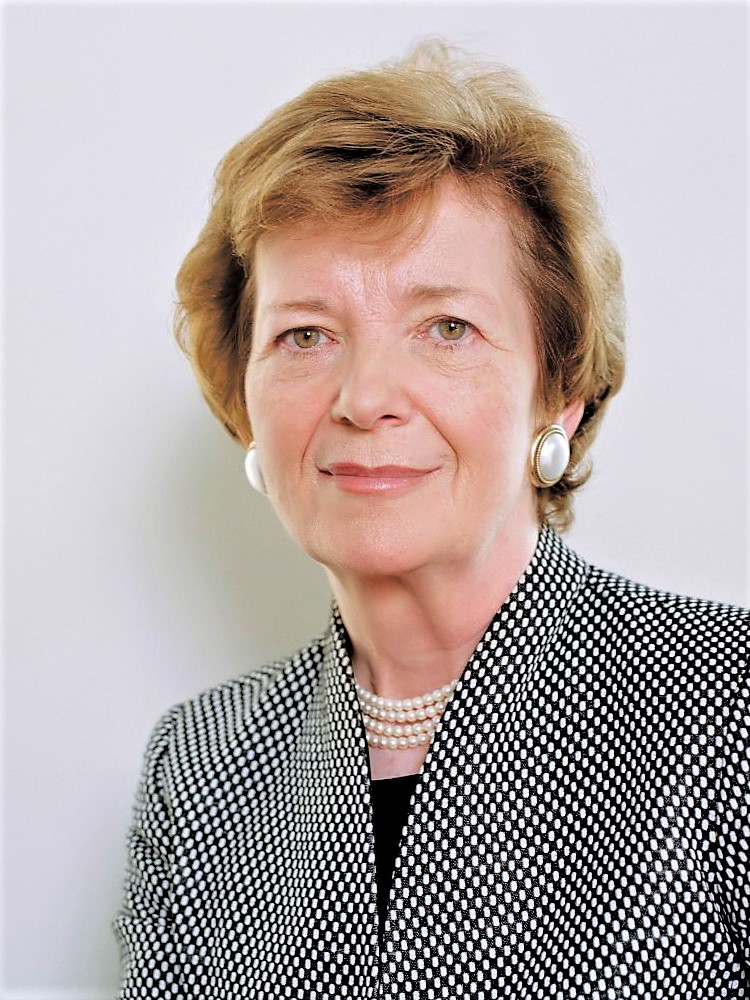
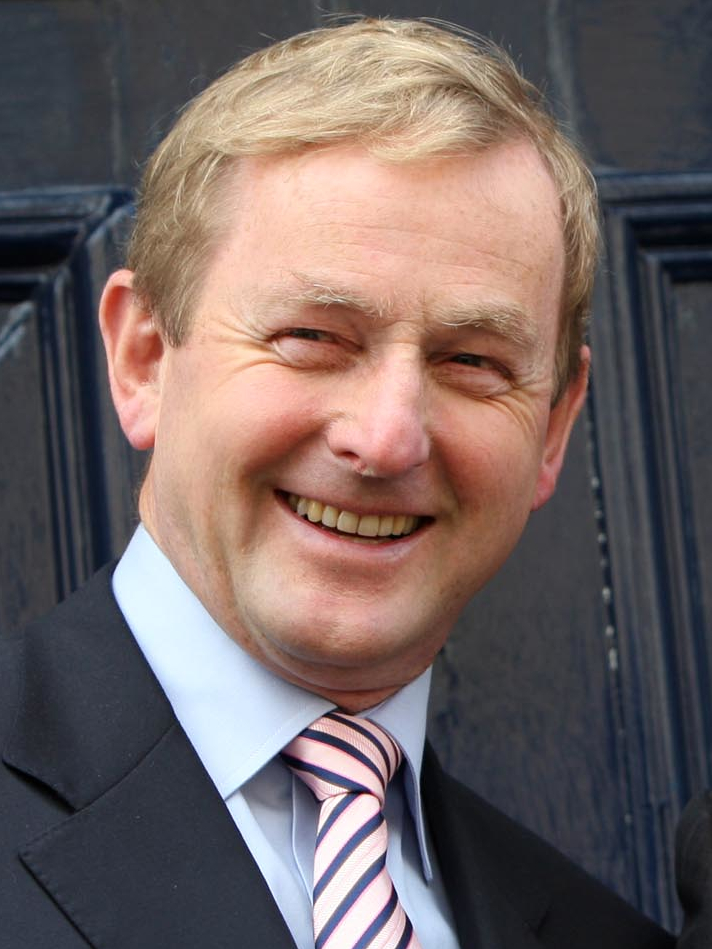
Mayo figures such as Mary Robinson and Enda Kenny were influential both nationally and internationally in the modern era.

The "Land Question" was gradually resolved by a scheme of state-aided land purchase schemes. The tenants became the owners of their lands under the newly set-up Land Commission.

A Mayo nun, Mother Agnes Morrogh-Bernard, set up the Foxford Woollen Mill in 1892. She made Foxford synonymous throughout the world with high-quality tweeds, rugs and blankets.

Mayo, as all parts of what became the Irish Free State, was affected by the events of the Irish revolutionary period, including the Irish War of Independence and the subsequent Irish Civil War. Major John MacBride of Westport was amongst those who took part in the 1916 Easter Rising and was subsequently executed by the British for his participation. His death served as a rallying call for Republicans in Mayo and led to Mayo men such as P. J. Ruttledge, Ernie O'Malley, Michael Kilroy and Thomas Derrig to rise up during the War of Independence. In the ensuing Civil War, many of these leading figures chose the Anti-treaty side and fought in bitter battles such as those in Ballina, which changed hands between pro and anti-treaty forces a number of times.

In the aftermath of the Civil War, there was a consolidation of many of those with anti-treaty feelings into the new political party Fianna Fáil. PJ Ruttledge and Thomas Derrig would become founding members of the party and served in Éamon de Valera's first-ever Fianna Fáil government as ministers. Mayo politicians would continue to contribute to the national political scene over the decades. In 1990 Mary Robinson, from County Mayo, became the first-ever female President of Ireland, and is widely credited with revitalising the position with importance and focus it had never possessed before. During her tenure she unveiled Ireland's National Famine Memorial which is situated in the village of Murrisk, County Mayo.

In 2011 Enda Kenny became the first politician from a Mayo constituency and the second Mayo native to serve as Taoiseach, the head of government of Ireland. Kenny went on to become the longest-serving Fine Gael Taoiseach in Irish history.

=== Clans and families ===
In the early historic period, what is now County Mayo consisted of a number of large kingdoms, minor lordships and tribes of obscure origins. They included:

- Calraige – pre-historic tribe found in the parishes of Attymass, Kilgarvan, Crossmolina and the River Moy
- Ciarraige – settlers from Munster found in south-east Mayo around Kiltimagh and west County Roscommon
- Conmaicne – a people located in the barony of Kilmaine, alleged descendants of Fergus mac Róich
- Fir Domnann – branch of the Laigin, originally from Britain, located in Erris
- Gamanraige – pre-historic kings of Connacht, famous for battle with Medb & Ailill of Cruachan in Táin Bó Flidhais. Based in Erris, Carrowmore Lake, Killala Bay, Lough Conn
- Gailenga – kingdom extending east from Castlebar to adjoining parts of Mayo
- Uí Fiachrach Muidhe – a sept of the Connachta, based around Ballina, some of whom were kings of Connacht
- Partraige – a pre-Gaelic people of Lough Mask and Lough Carra, namesakes of Partry
- Umaill – kingdom surrounding Clew Bay, east towards Castlebar, its rulers adopted the surname O'Malley

== Politics ==
The island of Ireland, showing location of County Mayo.

=== Local government and political subdivisions ===
Mayo County Council is the authority responsible for local government. As a county council, it is governed by the Local Government Act 2001. The county is divided into four municipal districts of Ballina, Castlebar, Claremorris and Westport–Belmullet, each with a population of roughly 32,000 to 34,000 people. The council is responsible for housing and community, roads and transportation, urban planning and development, amenity and culture, and environment.

County Mayo is divided into six local electoral areas (LEAs). Councillors are elected for a five-year term.

Local electoral area	Number of councillors
Castlebar	7
Ballina	6
Westport	4
Belmullet	3
Claremorris	6
Swinford	4

The county town is at Áras an Contae in Castlebar, the main population centre located in the centre of the county.

=== National politics ===
Since 2016, Mayo has been represented on a national political level by four TDs who represent the constituency of Mayo in Dáil Éireann. Previous to 2016 the constituency had five TDs but this was reduced based on the county's current population in line with proportional representation. The electoral divisions of Cong, Dalgan, Houndswood, Kilmaine, Neale, Shrule, in the former Rural District of Ballinrobe, are in Galway West.

==== Voting patterns and political history ====
Historically, Mayo has tended to vote Fianna Fáil, as Fianna Fáil managed to position themselves in the 20th century as the party best fit to represent farmers with small holdings, who were plentiful in Mayo. With so many of Mayo's electorate being small farmers, the county became a base for the emergence of Clann na Talmhan, an agrarian party in the 1940s and 1950s. Clann an Talmhan's second leader, Joseph Blowick came from South Mayo and that is where his seat was. The party was not able to last in the long run though as it was unable to hold together its voting bloc of both small farmers in the west of Ireland and large farmers in the east.

Towards the start of the 21st century, the balance of power in Mayo began to shift towards Fine Gael, thanks in part to the emergence of Enda Kenny and Michael Ring. Kenny, who became Taoiseach in 2011, led Fine Gael to its best electoral performance since 1982 in a historic victory in the 2011 Irish general election, which included securing four out of five available seats for his party in Mayo.

In 2020, Rose Conway-Walsh came within 200 votes of topping the poll and became the first Sinn Féin TD for Mayo since 1927, riding a nationwide surge for Sinn Féin that year. In the subsequent 2024 election, she went on to top the poll by 600 votes

Despite being historically the third-largest party in Ireland, Labour has struggled to ever make inroads into Mayo. The party has only ever had one TD for Mayo, former party leader Thomas J. O'Connell, who represented South Mayo between 1927 and 1932. While Labour has not proven itself electorally successful in Mayo, Mayo has provided important members to the Labour Party. Mary Robinson from Ballina became the first-ever female President of Ireland, while Pat Rabbitte, originally from Claremorris, served as leader of the Labour Party from 2002 to 2007. Serving alongside Rabbitte was Emmet Stagg, one of the longest-standing Labour TDs of the modern era, himself from Hollymount not far from Claremorris.

== Demographics ==
Historical population
Year	Pop.	±%
1580	22,080	—
1585	23,920	+8.3%
1600	24,950	+4.3%
1610	25,799	+3.4%
1653	27,211	+5.5%
1659	29,967	+10.1%
1668	38,991	+30.1%
1672	55,202	+41.6%
1680	59,886	+8.5%
1690	63,445	+5.9%
1700	71,224	+12.3%
1710	78,555	+10.3%
1725	90,557	+15.3%
1781	123,207	+36.1%
1788	155,768	+26.4%
1790	195,668	+25.6%
1801	225,799	+15.4%
1811	231,798	+2.7%
1813	267,668	+15.5%
1816	251,334	−6.1%
1821	293,112	+16.6%
1831	366,328	+25.0%
1841	388,887	+6.2%
1851	274,499	−29.4%
1861	254,796	−7.2%
1871	246,030	−3.4%
1881	245,212	−0.3%
1891	219,034	−10.7%
1901	199,166	−9.1%
1911	192,177	−3.5%
1926	172,690	−10.1%
1936	161,349	−6.6%
1946	148,120	−8.2%
1951	141,867	−4.2%
1956	133,052	−6.2%
1961	123,330	−7.3%
1966	115,547	−6.3%
1971	109,525	−5.2%
1979	114,019	+4.1%
1981	114,766	+0.7%
1986	115,184	+0.4%
1991	110,713	−3.9%
1996	111,524	+0.7%
2002	117,446	+5.3%
2006	123,839	+5.4%
2011	130,638	+5.5%
2016	130,507	−0.1%
2022	137,231	+5.2%

Irish history has been defined by waves of emigration due to push and pull factors. Mayo was one of the counties most depopulated by emigration in the ninetieth and twentieth century. Initially triggered by starvation during the Great Famine, the population fell from 388,887 to 274,830 between 1841 and 1851. Then in search of work in the newly industrialising United Kingdom and the United States, the population plummeted from 388,887 in 1841 to 199,166 in 1901. It reached a low of 109,525 in 1971. Emigration slowed dramatically as the Irish economy began to expand in the 1990s and early 2000s, and the population of Mayo increased from 110,713 in 1991 to 130,638 in 2011.

=== Religion ===
In the 2006 National Census, the religious demographic breakdown for County Mayo was 114,215 Roman Catholics, 2,476 Church of Ireland, 733 Muslims, 409 other Christians, 280 Presbyterians, 250 Orthodox Christians, 204 Methodists, 853 other stated religions, 3,267 no religion and 1,152 no stated religion.

=== Irish language ===
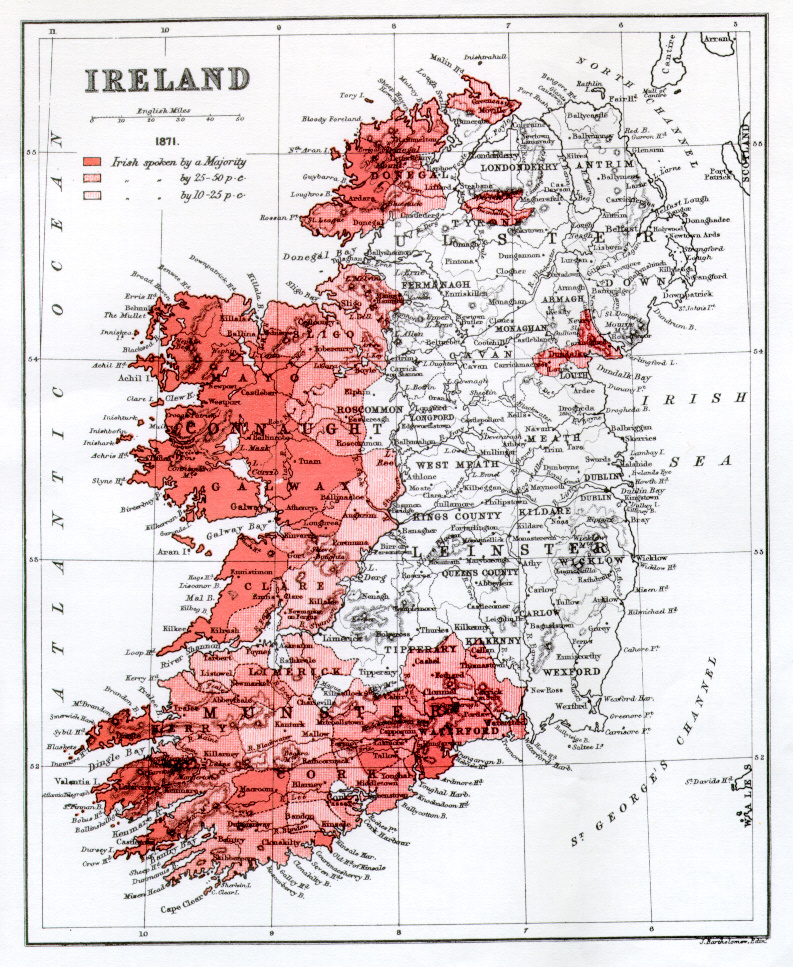
The distribution of the Irish language in 1871. Mayo's relative remoteness meant that Irish was still widely spoken decades after the Great Famine and is still spoken today in the north-west of the county

9% of the population of County Mayo live in the Gaeltacht. The Gaeltacht Irish-speaking region in County Mayo is the third-largest in Ireland with 10,886 inhabitants. These Irish-speaking areas of Mayo contain 5,956 Irish speakers. Tourmakeady is the largest village in this area. All schools in the area use Irish as the language of instruction. Mayo has four gaelscoileanna in its four major towns, providing primary education to students through Irish.

== Transport ==
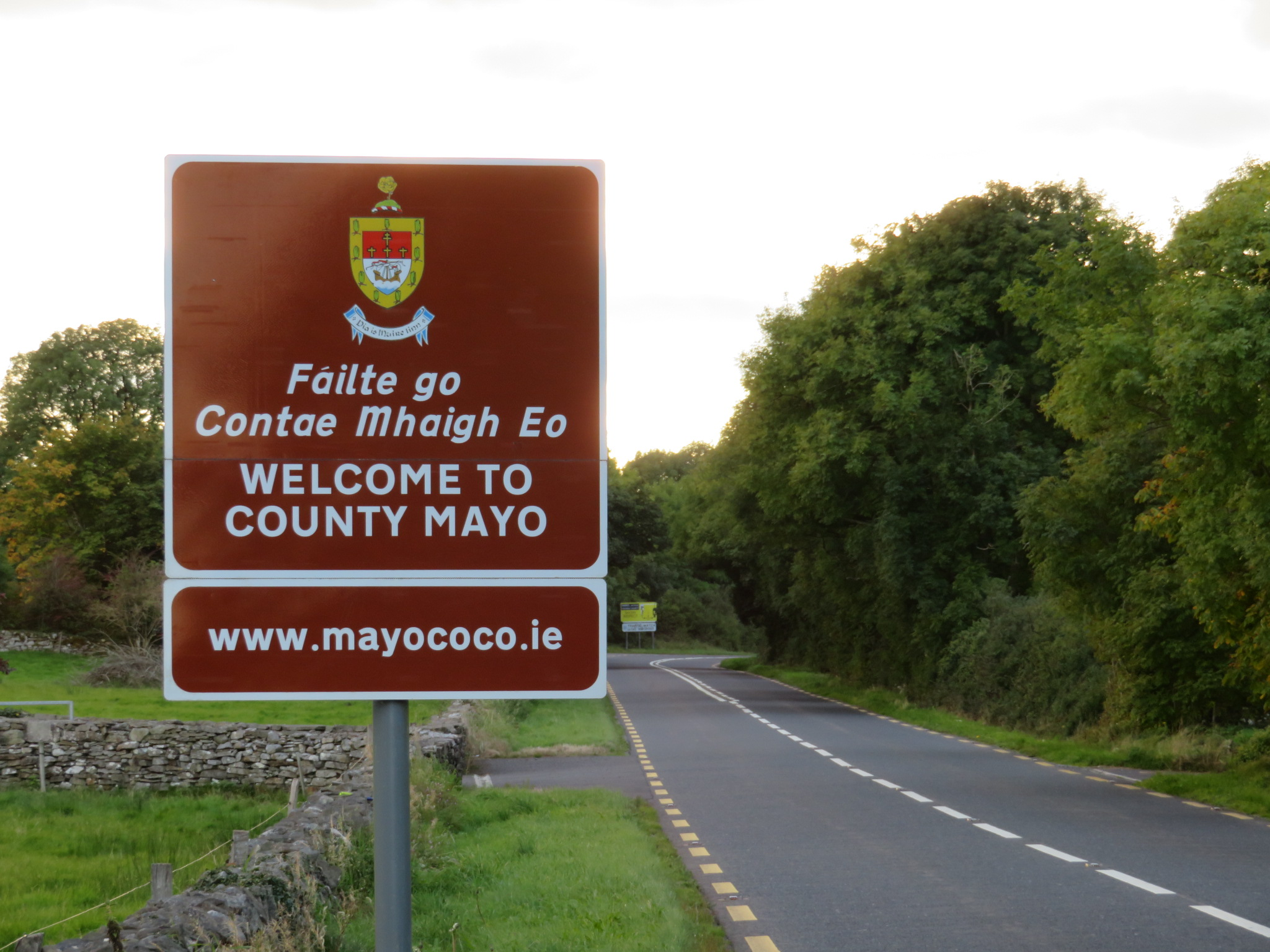
County border sign on the N60 road

=== Rail ===
Westport railway station is the terminus station on the Dublin to Westport Rail service. Railway stations are also located at Ballyhaunis, Claremorris, Castlebar, Manulla, Ballina and Foxford. All railway stations are located on the same railway line, with the exception of Ballina and Foxford which requires passengers to change at Manulla Junction. There are currently six services each way every day on the line.

There are also proposals to reopen the currently disused Western Railway Corridor connecting Limerick with Sligo. In 2025, funding was allocated to restore the section of line between Athenry and Claremorris, which will restore Mayo's rail link with Galway and Limerick upon its completion. Preparatory works have begun and the line is scheduled to open by 2031.

=== Road ===
There are a number of national primary roads in the county including the N5 road connecting Westport with Dublin, the N17 road connecting the county with Galway and Sligo and the N26 road connecting Ballina with Dublin via the N5. There are a number of national secondary roads in the county also including the N58 road, N59 road, N60 road, N83 road & N84 road. In June 2023, as part of upgrades to the N5, a new dual carriageway was opened between Castlebar and Westport, the first four lane road with hard shoulders within Mayo.

=== Air ===
Ireland West Airport Knock is an international airport located in the county. The name is derived from the nearby village of Knock. The 2020s have seen the airport's passenger numbers grow faster than any other airport in Ireland, with 946,381 people using the airport in 2025, its busiest year to date. The airport now serves 22 international destinations and is served by three of Europe’s major international airlines: Aer Lingus, Lauda Europe, and Ryanair.

== Places of interest ==
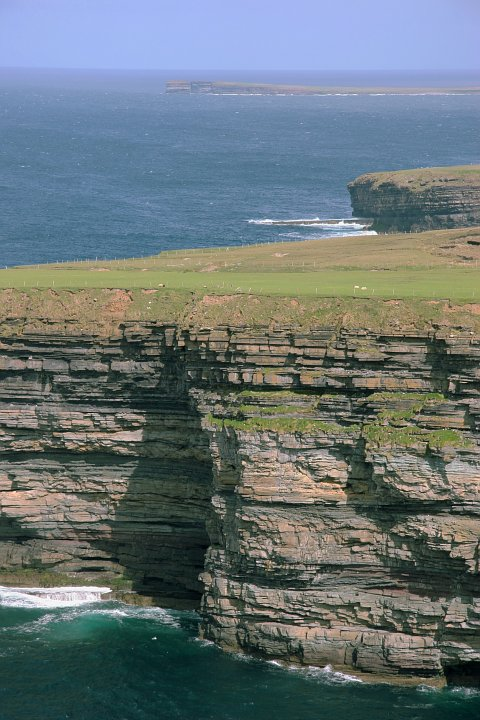
Cliffs along the Atlantic coastline of County Mayo, near Ballycastle

- Ashford Castle
- Ballintubber Abbey
- Blacksod Lighthouse
- Broadhaven Bay
- Burrishoole Abbey
- Céide Fields
- Clare Island
- Cong Abbey
- Croagh Patrick
- Eagle Island lighthouse
- Erris
- Granuaile's Castle, Clare Island
- Great Western Greenway
- Joyce Country
- Killala Bay
- Knock Shrine
- List of designated Scenic Roads in County Mayo
- Lough Mask
- Mayo Peace Park
- Moore Hall
- Moygownagh
- Mullet Peninsula
- Murrisk Abbey
- Murrisk Millennium Peace Park
- National Museum of Ireland – Country Life
- National Famine Memorial
- Nephin
- Partry Mountains
- Rockfleet Castle
- Sruwaddacon Bay
- Tourmakeady
- Uggool Beach
- Westport House
- Wild Nephin National Park

== Media ==
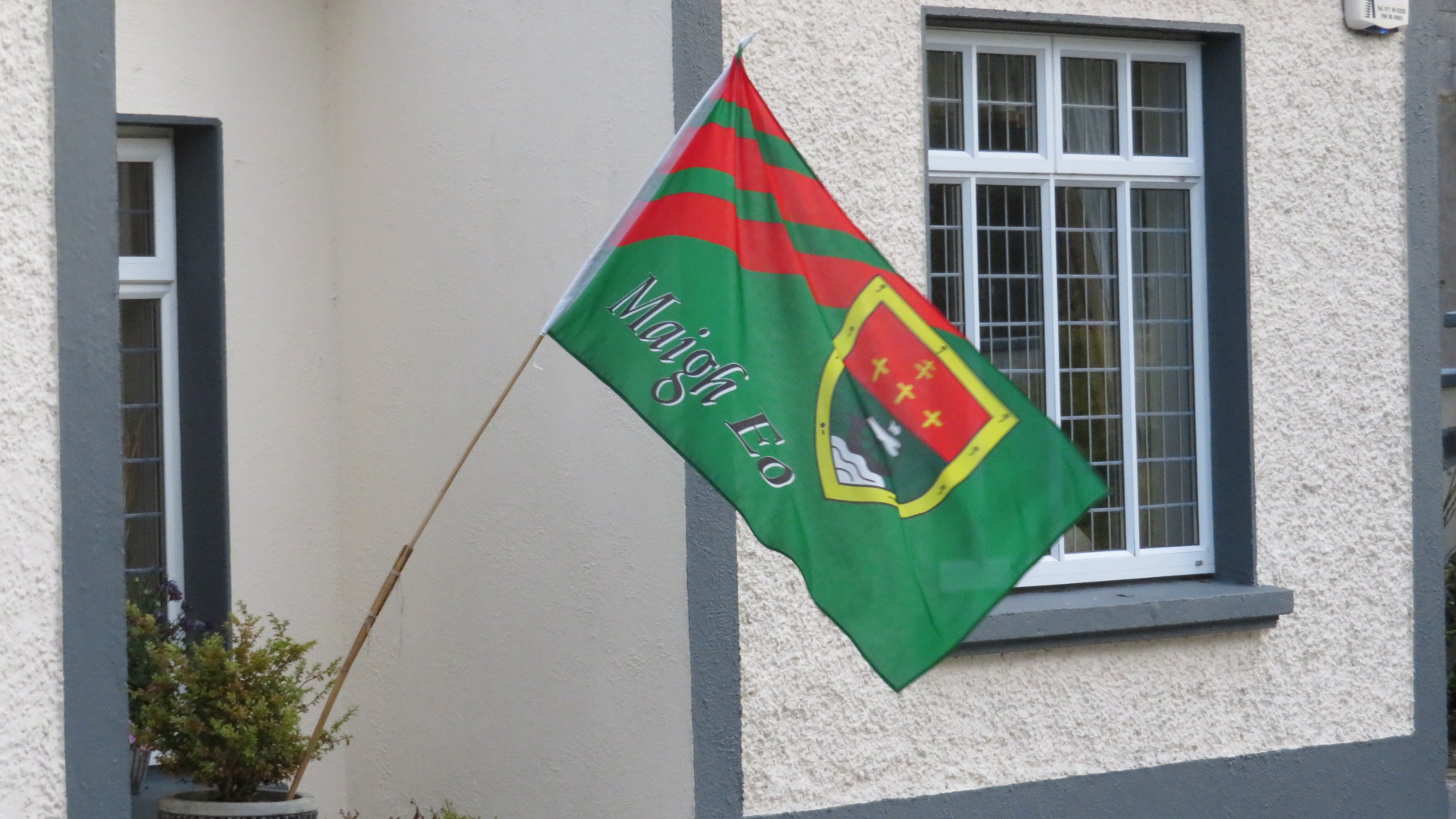
Mayo GAA flag

Newspapers in County Mayo include The Mayo News, the Connaught Telegraph, the Connacht Tribune, Western People, and Mayo Advertiser, which is Mayo's only free newspaper.

Mayo Now is a monthly entertainment and culture magazine for the towns of Ballina, Foxford, Killala, Crossmolina and surrounding areas – this is out on the first Friday of each month.

Mayo has its own online TV channel Mayo TV which was launched in 2011. It covers news and events from around the county and regularly broadcasts live to a worldwide audience. Local radio stations include Erris FM, Community Radio Castlebar, Westport Community Radio, BCR FM (Ballina Community Radio) and M.W.R. (Mid West Radio).

The documentary Pipe Down, which won best feature documentary at the 2009 Waterford Film Festival, was made in Mayo.

== Energy ==
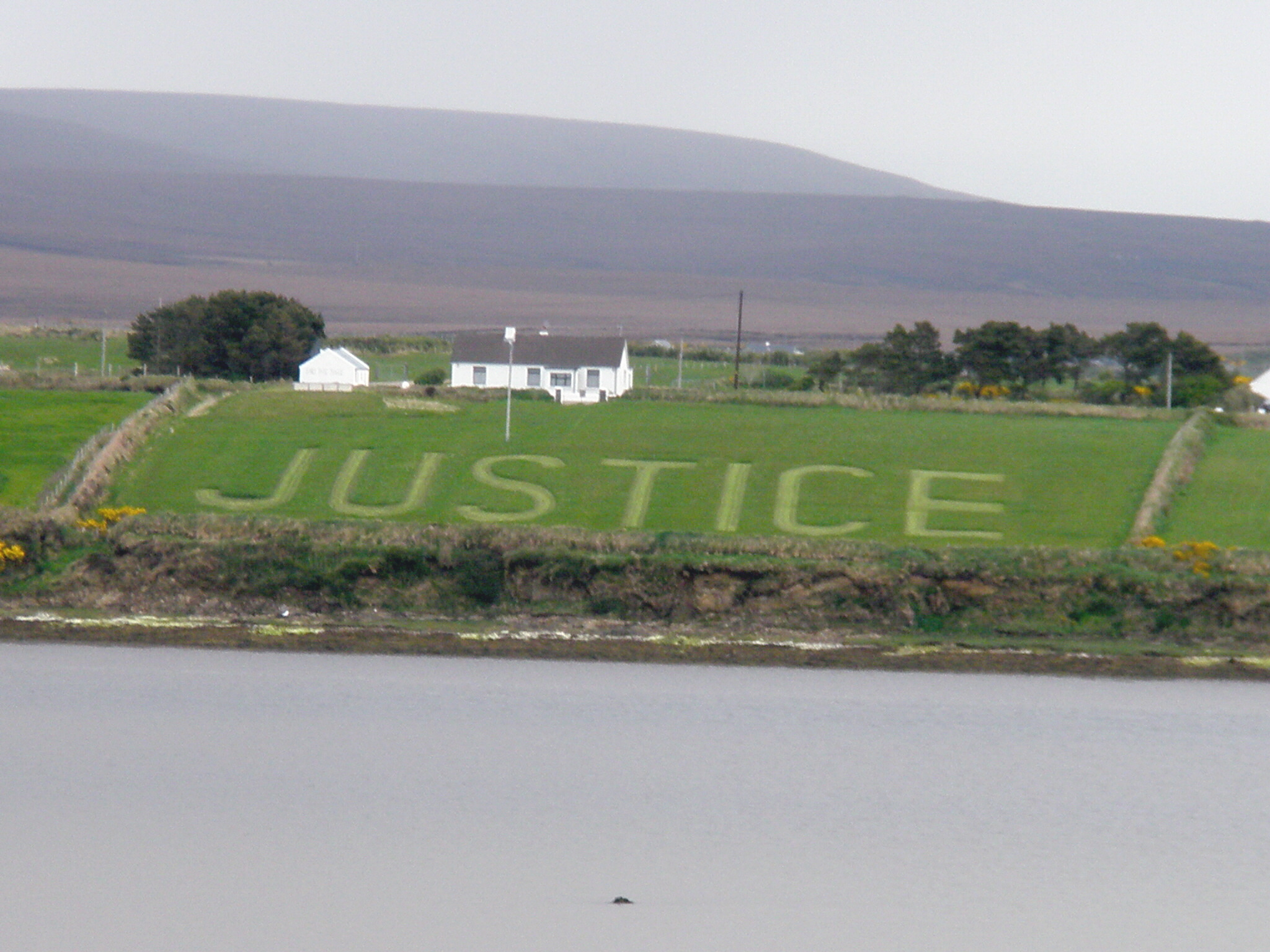
'Justice' (for the Rossport Five) mowed in Ros Dumhach hay field

=== Energy controversy ===
There is local resistance to Shell's decision to process raw gas from the Corrib gas field at an onshore terminal. In 2005, five local men were jailed for contempt of court after refusing to follow an Irish court order. Subsequent protests against the project led to the Shell to Sea and related campaigns.

=== Energy audit ===
The Mayo Energy Audit 2009–2020 is an investigation into the implications of peak oil and subsequent fossil fuel depletion for a rural county in west of Ireland. The study draws together many different strands to examine current energy supply and demand within the area of study, and assesses these demands in the face of the challenges posed by the declining production of fossil fuels and expected disruptions to supply chains, and by long-term economic recession.

== Sport ==
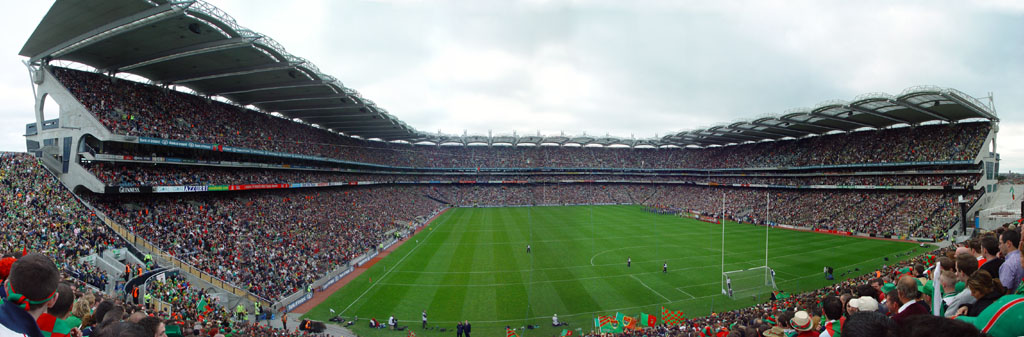
Croke Park kitted out in the Mayo colours for the 2004 All-Ireland Senior Football Final

The Mayo GAA senior team last won the Sam Maguire Cup in 2026, ending a 75 year drought from 1951. The team's fourth title followed victories in 1936, 1950 and 1951 when the team was captained by Seán Flanagan. Since 1951, the team have made numerous All-Ireland Final appearances (in 1989, twice in 1996, 1997, 2004, 2006, 2012, 2013, twice again in 2016 against Dublin, 2017, 2020, 2021 against Tyrone in the final and in 2026), though the team have failed on all occasions to achieve victory over their opponents with the exception of 2026.

The team's unofficial supporters club are Mayo Club '51, named after the team who won the Sam Maguire in 1951. The county colours of Mayo GAA are traditionally green and red.

The county's most popular association football teams are Westport United and Castlebar Celtic.

Although Gaelic football and association football are the most popular sport in the county, other sports are popular in the county as well such as rugby, basketball, hurling, swimming, tennis, badminton, athletics, handball and racquetball.

== Notable people ==
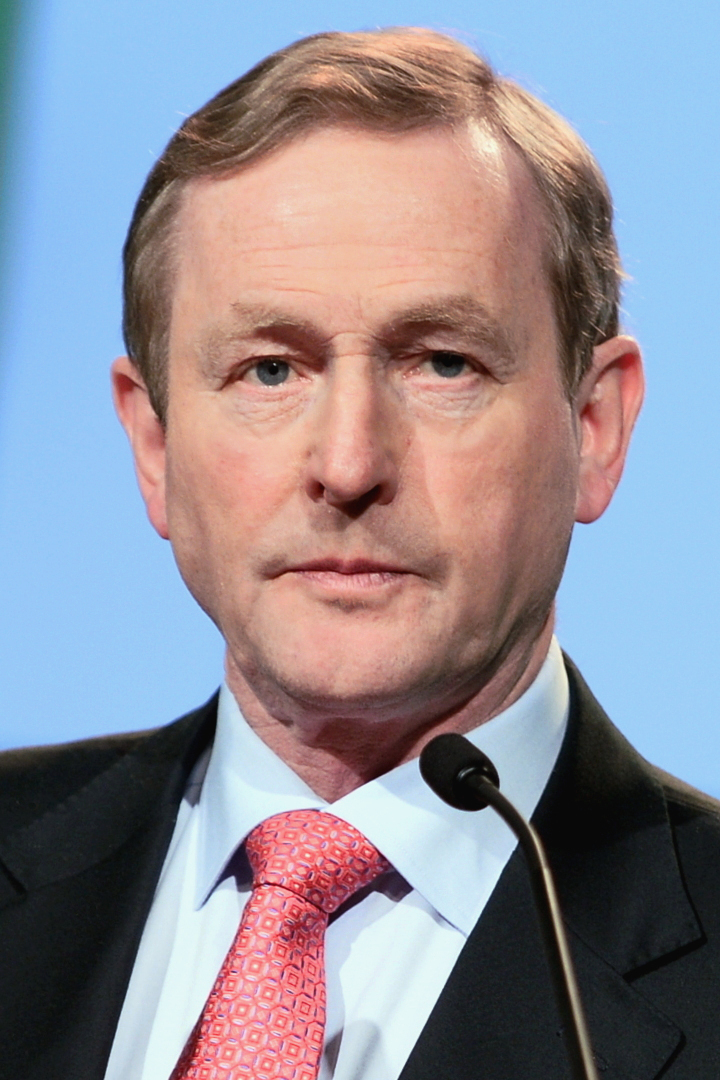
Enda Kenny

- Richard Bourke, 6th Earl of Mayo (1822–1872) – Viceroy of India (1869–1872)
- Patrick Browne (1720–1790) – physician and botanist
- Michael Davitt (1846–1906) – Irish republican, agrarian campaigner, labour leader, Home Rule politician and Member of Parliament (MP) who founded the Irish National Land League.
- Grace O'Malley (circa 1530 – circa 1603) – Lord of the O'Malley dynasty in the 16th century
- Admiral William Brown (1777–1857) – Founder of the Argentine Navy
- Charles Haughey (1925–2006) – Taoiseach of Ireland (1979–1982; 1987–1992)
- Enda Kenny (born 1951) – Politician, leader of Fine Gael (2002–2017), and Taoiseach of Ireland (2011–2017)
- John MacBride (1868–1916) – Republican and military leader, executed by the British for his participation in the 1916 Easter Rising
- William O'Dwyer (1890–1964) – 100th mayor of New York City (1946–1950)
- Michael Ring (born 1953) – Politician and Mayo TD, Minister for Rural and Community Development (2017–2020)
- Mary Robinson (born 1944) – First female President of Ireland (1990–1997), and United Nations High Commissioner for Human rights.
- Millie Robinson (1924–1994) – Cyclist: first winner of women's Tour de France (1955) and holder of women's world hour record (1958)
- Sally Rooney (born 1991) – Author (Conversations with Friends, Normal People), and screenwriter
- John Ruane (1936–2006) – American jockey, born County Mayo
- Martin Sheridan, Olympic Games gold medalist representing the United States
- Louis Walsh (born 1952) – Entertainment manager and judge on The X Factor (UK), and Ireland's Got Talent
- Sinead Diver (born 1977) - Marathon runner, representing Australia

== See also ==
- High Sheriff of Mayo
- List of abbeys and priories in the Republic of Ireland (County Mayo)
- List of loughs of County Mayo
- List of Mayo people
- List of mountains and hills of County Mayo
- List of rivers of County Mayo
- List of roads of County Mayo
- Lord Lieutenant of Mayo
- Mayo County Council
- River Robe
- Táin Bó Flidhais
