= R310 road (Ireland) =

Road in Ireland

R310 road
- Bóthar R310
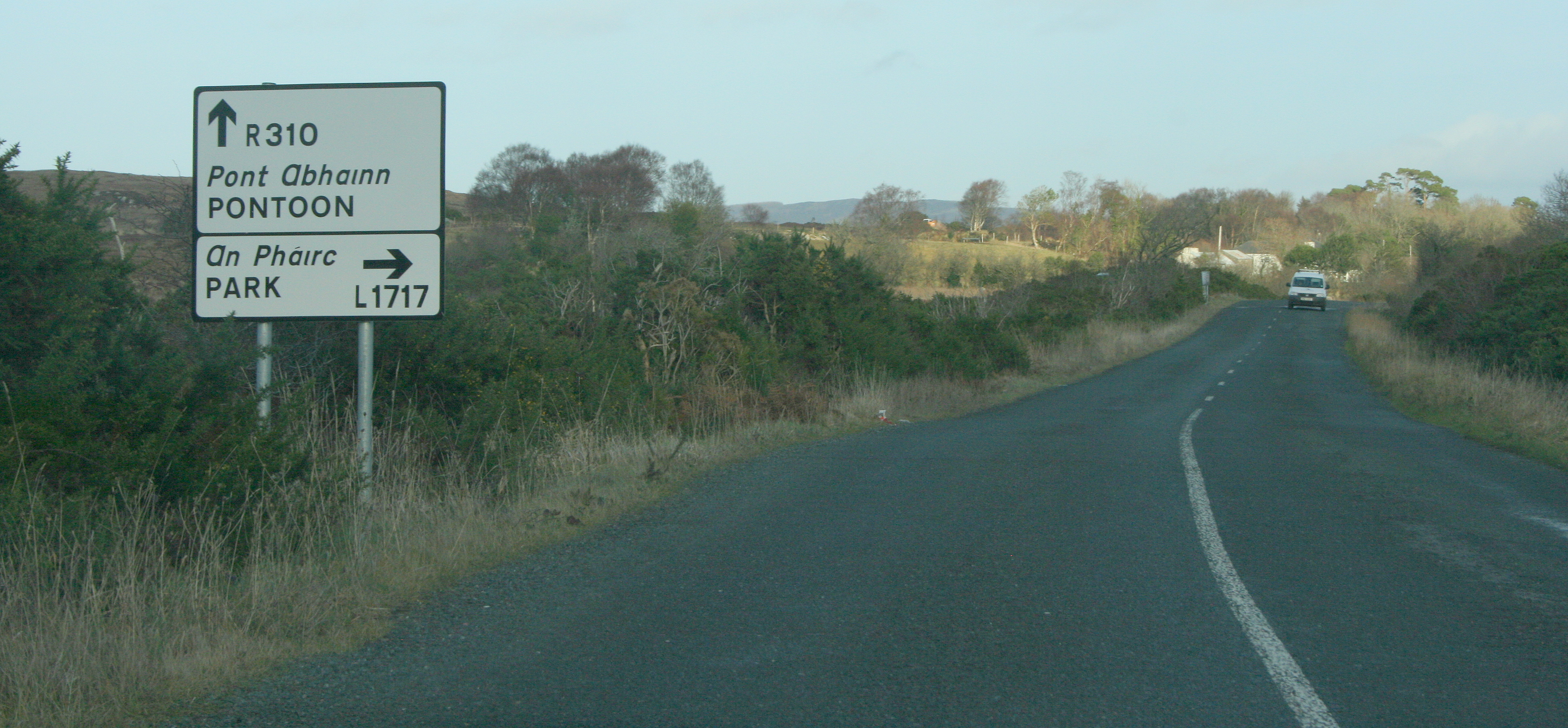
- Towards Pontoon

Route information
- Length: 34 km (21 mi)

Location
- Country: Ireland
- Primary destinations: County Mayo; Castlebar starts at junction with the N5; (R311); Crosses the River Clydagh; Ross West; Pontoon - (R315); crosses the River Moy strait between Lough Conn and Lough Cullin; (R318); Knockmore; Corroy; Crosses the Manulla - Ballina railway line; Ballina – terminates at junction with the N26 south of the town.

Highway system
- Roads in Ireland; Motorways; Primary; Secondary; Regional

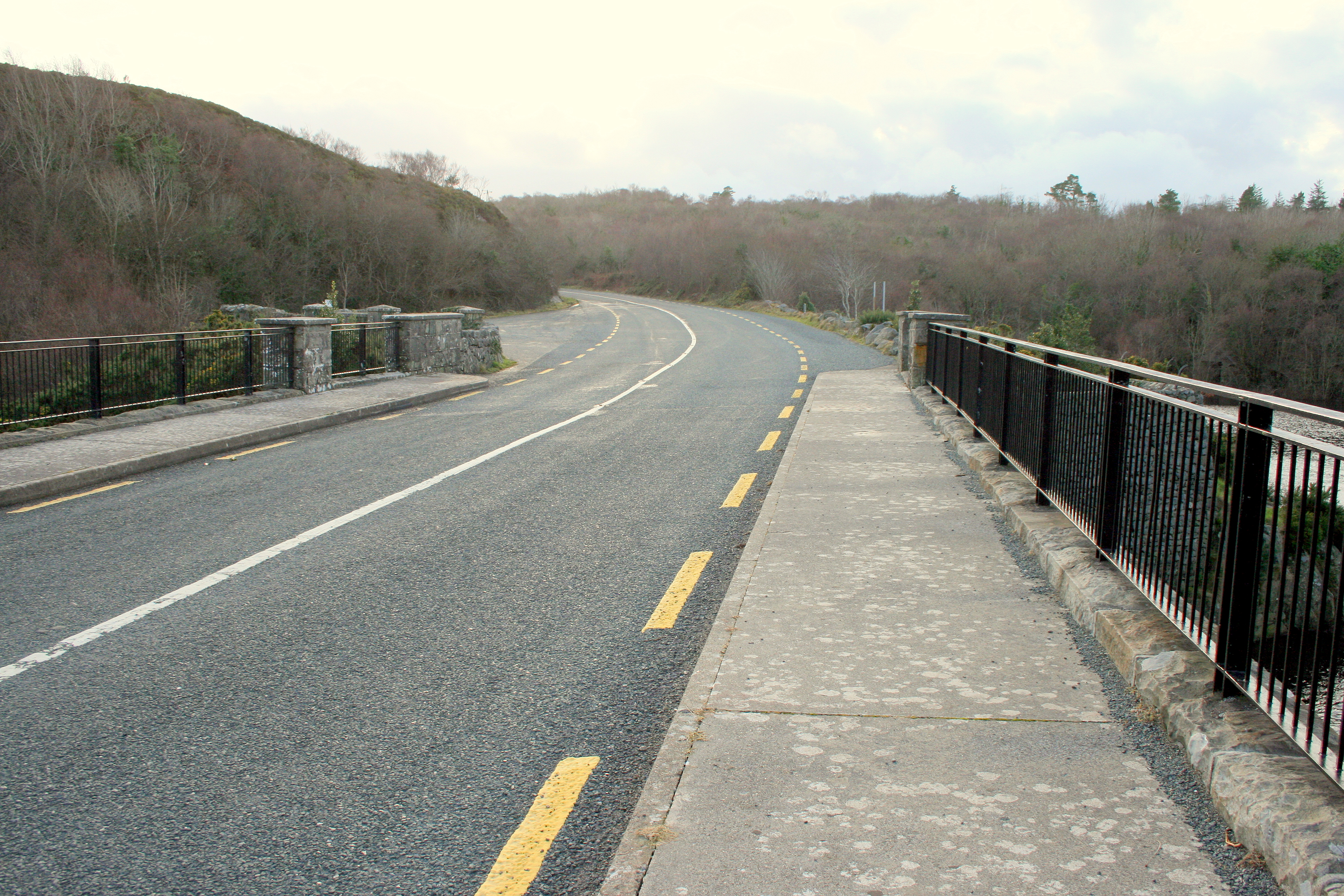
Pontoon Bridge

The R310 road is a regional road in County Mayo, Ireland. South to north the route connects the town of Castlebar to Ballina. En route it crosses over a strait linking Lough Conn and Lough Cullin at Pontoon, part of River Moy outflow.

The road is in north County Mayo and is 34 km (21 mi) long.

== See also ==
- List of roads of County Mayo
- National primary road
- National secondary road
- Roads in Ireland
