= Bohalis =

- Townland
- Location in Ireland
- Coordinates: 53°55′43″N 8°37′59″W
- Country: Ireland
- Province: Connacht
- County: County Roscommon
- Elevation: 80 m (260 ft)
- Time zone: UTC+0 (WET)
  - Summer (DST): UTC-1 (IST (WEST))

Bohalis (alternatively Bohalas ) is a small townland in County Roscommon. It is located on the N5 road in Ireland between Ballaghaderreen, County Roscommon and Carracastle, County Mayo.
