= N26 road (Ireland) =

Road in Ireland

Coordinates: 54.02270°N 8.93600°W

N26 road
- Bóthar N26

Route information
- Length: 29.79 km (18.51 mi)

Location
- Country: Ireland
- Primary destinations: County Mayo; Kilbride (N5 road); Swinford (R375, R320); Crosses the River Moy; Foxford (N58, R318); Crosses the River Moy; Rahans (R310 road); Ballina (N59, R294)

Highway system
- Roads in Ireland; Motorways; Primary; Secondary; Regional

The N26 road is a national primary road in northeast County Mayo in Ireland connecting the N5 road at Swinford with the N58 at Foxford and then on to the N59 road at Ballina. The road also meets six regional roads along its route, and it is 29.79 kilometres (18.51 mi) long (map).

The government legislation that defines the N26, the S.I. No. 53/2012 — Roads Act 1993 (Classification of National Roads) Order 2012, provides the following official description:

N26: Swinford — Ballina, County Mayo

Between its junction with N5 at Kilbride in the county of Mayo and its junction with N59 at Lord Edward Street in the town of Ballina via Back Street and Main Street at Swinford; Clongullane Bridge, Callow; Chapel Road and Bridge Street at Foxford; Bellass, Drumrevagh, Carrowntreila and Rahans in the county of Mayo: Rahans Bridge at the boundary between the county of Mayo and the town of Ballina; Foxford Road, Station Road and Kevin Barry Street in the town of Ballina.

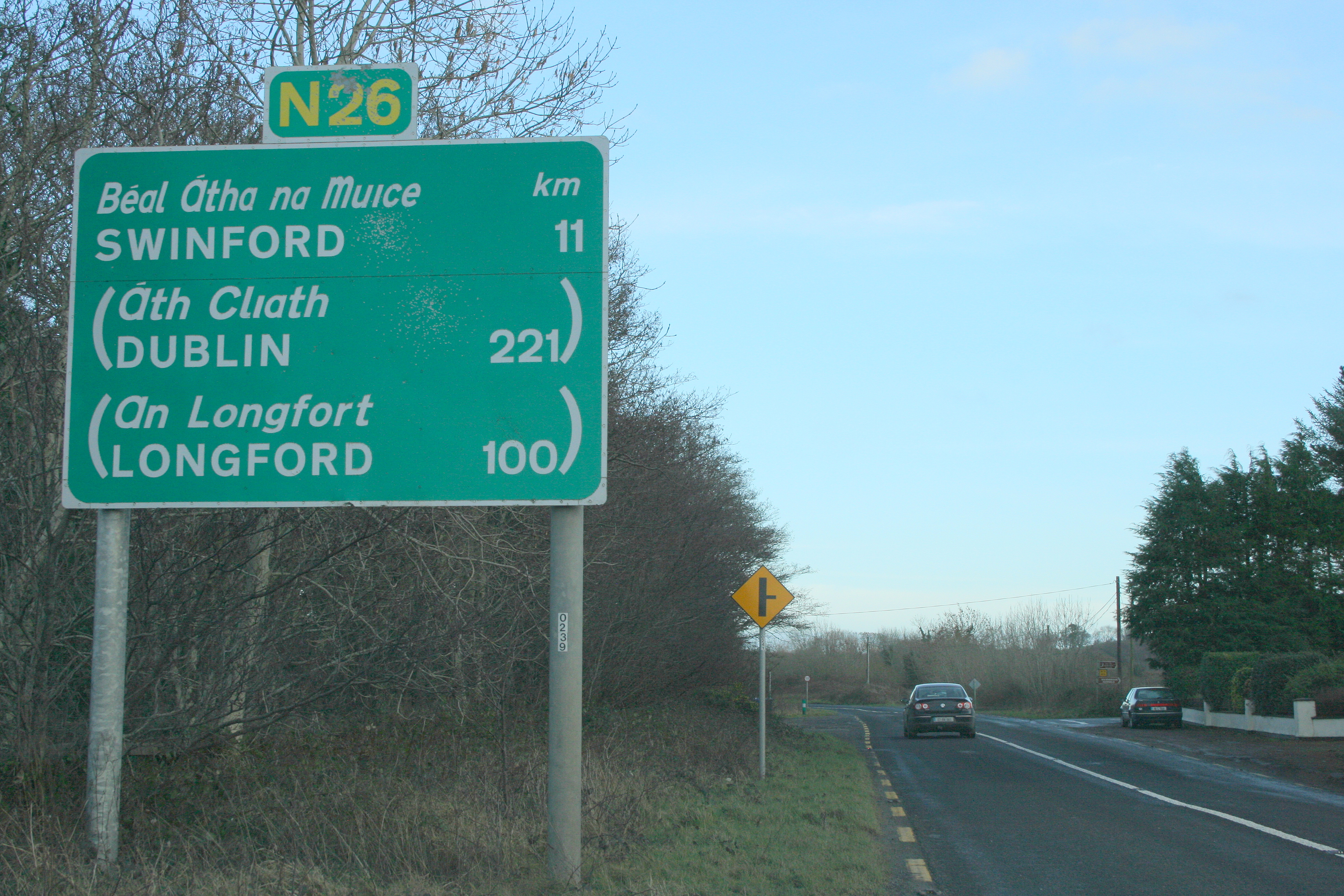
N26 leaving Foxford

This route was previously a national secondary road known as the N57 (leaving the N57 as a defunct route allocation). The route is Mayo's second busiest road after the N5, with almost 10,000 vehicles daily using the route between Ballina and Foxford.

The route diverges from the N5 near Swinford and passes through that town. It runs northwest to Foxford, where the road meets the N58 (which runs south back to the N5). From here the route turns north to Ballina. At Ballina the road meets the N59, which runs east–west through the town. The section between Foxford and Swinford was of very sub-standard quality and used to have an extremely narrow bridge over the River Moy at Callow, where two large vehicles could not pass at the same time. The dangerous bridge is located on a double bend and interrupted the flow of traffic hugely. In 2023, the Callow part of this route was renovated to have a modernised bridge and a route that eliminates the double bend. The renovated road was built partially over the old one, with the remnants of the old road being repurposed into a bike lane.

The N26 is the first "extra" allocation of a national primary route other than the original 25. There are now primary routes up to N33. The physical upgrading, or modernisation, of the road has been in the planning stages for over 10 years. The proposed upgrading of the N26 was divided into two phases with the first phase (5 km) just south of Ballina opening to traffic in December 2004, this new section eliminated a dangerous stretch and has much improved the approach into Ballina town.

The second phase (19 km in length) from Carrowntrella-Bohola was planned to be of type two dual-carriageway standard and would have bypassed Foxford and Swinford. It would also have been the first dual carriageway ever constructed in Co Mayo and was to join the N5 just west of Bohola. However, planning permission for the project was denied by An Bord Pleanala in 2010 and the road is now being redesigned.

== See also ==
- Roads in Ireland
- Motorways in Ireland
- National secondary road
- Regional road
