= Foxford =

Town in County Mayo, Ireland

Foxford Béal Easa (Irish)
- Town
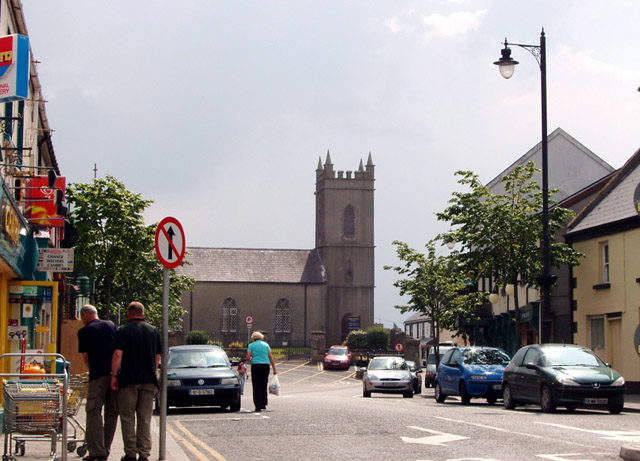
- Market Square

- Location in Ireland
- Coordinates: 53°58′52″N 9°06′50″W
- Country: Ireland
- Province: Connacht
- County: Mayo
- Elevation: 12 m (39 ft)

Population (2016)
  - Total: 1,315
- Irish Grid Reference: G265040

Foxford (Irish: Béal Easa, meaning 'mouth of the waterfall') is a town 16 km south of Ballina in County Mayo, Ireland. It is on the N26 road between Swinford and Ballina and has a railway station served by trains between Manulla Junction and Ballina.

Foxford lies on the River Moy, a salmon-fishing river, close to Lough Conn and Lough Cullin and between the Nephin and Ox Mountains. The Foxford Way is an 86-km waymarked tourist trail that circles Foxford, taking in the Ox Mountains, bogland, archeological sites, lakeshores and river banks.

Agnes Morrogh Bernard founded a convent and started a water-powered woollen mill here in 1892. The Foxford Woollen Mills are known for producing characteristic wool blankets.

== Etymology ==
The name Foxford comes from the Irish: Béal an Easa, meaning "mouth of the waterfall". The name previously referred to a large fox-shaped rock at a ford by the town. This may be the same rock as "Cromwell's Rock", which signifies the ford where it is thought Cromwell's Army crossed the River Moy during his campaign.

== Transport ==
=== Road ===
The N26 road passes through the town, crossing a narrow bridge over the River Moy. The N58 serves as the main road to Castlebar, travelling south to through Strade, and joining the N5 in Ballyvary. The R318 travels west along the Station Road towards Pontoon, through Drummin Forest, before connecting to the R310. In 2005 a new link road between the N26 and N58 was built, easing traffic congestion in the town centre.

=== Rail ===
Foxford railway station is on the Manulla Junction to Ballina line which connects to the Westport-Dublin Heuston service. The station opened on 1 May 1868. After being closed (against local opposition) in 1963, it was reopened in 1988.

== Notable people ==
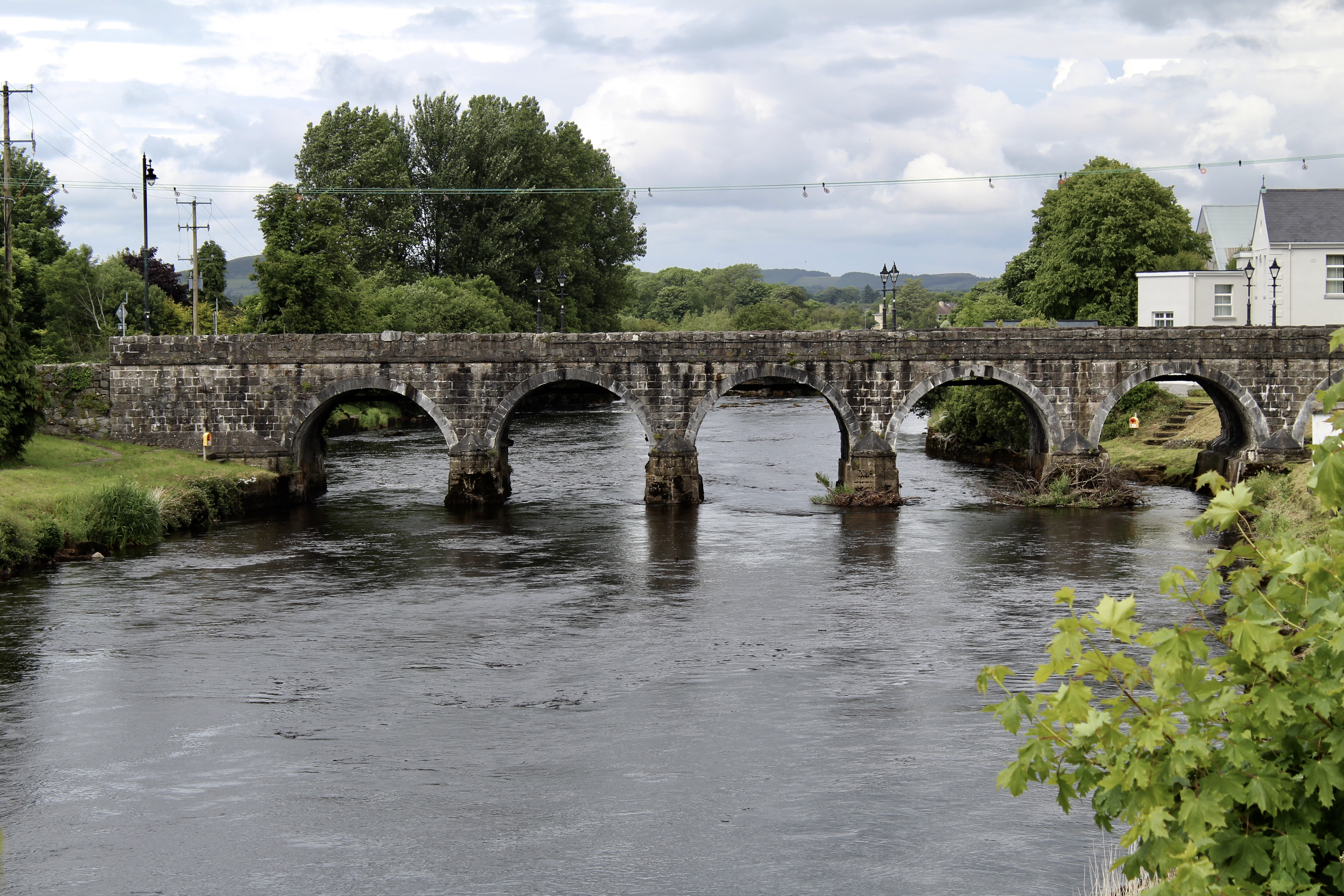
Foxford bridge

- Laura Bernal (1956–2020), Argentina's ambassador to Ireland who died in office, was a regular visitor to Foxford and is buried at Craggagh Cemetery a short distance away.
- Agnes Bernard (1842–1932), founder of convent, woollen mills, and a band in Foxford.
- Admiral William Brown (1777–1857), founder of the Argentine Navy, hero of the Argentine War of Independence, and defender of Buenos Aires in the Cisplatine War, was born in Foxford.
- F. R. Higgins (1896–1941), poet and theatre director, born in Foxford.
- Mike Flanagan (1926–2014), soldier who assisted the formation of the Israeli armed forces.
- Marie-Louise O'Donnell (born 1952), academic, broadcaster, politician.

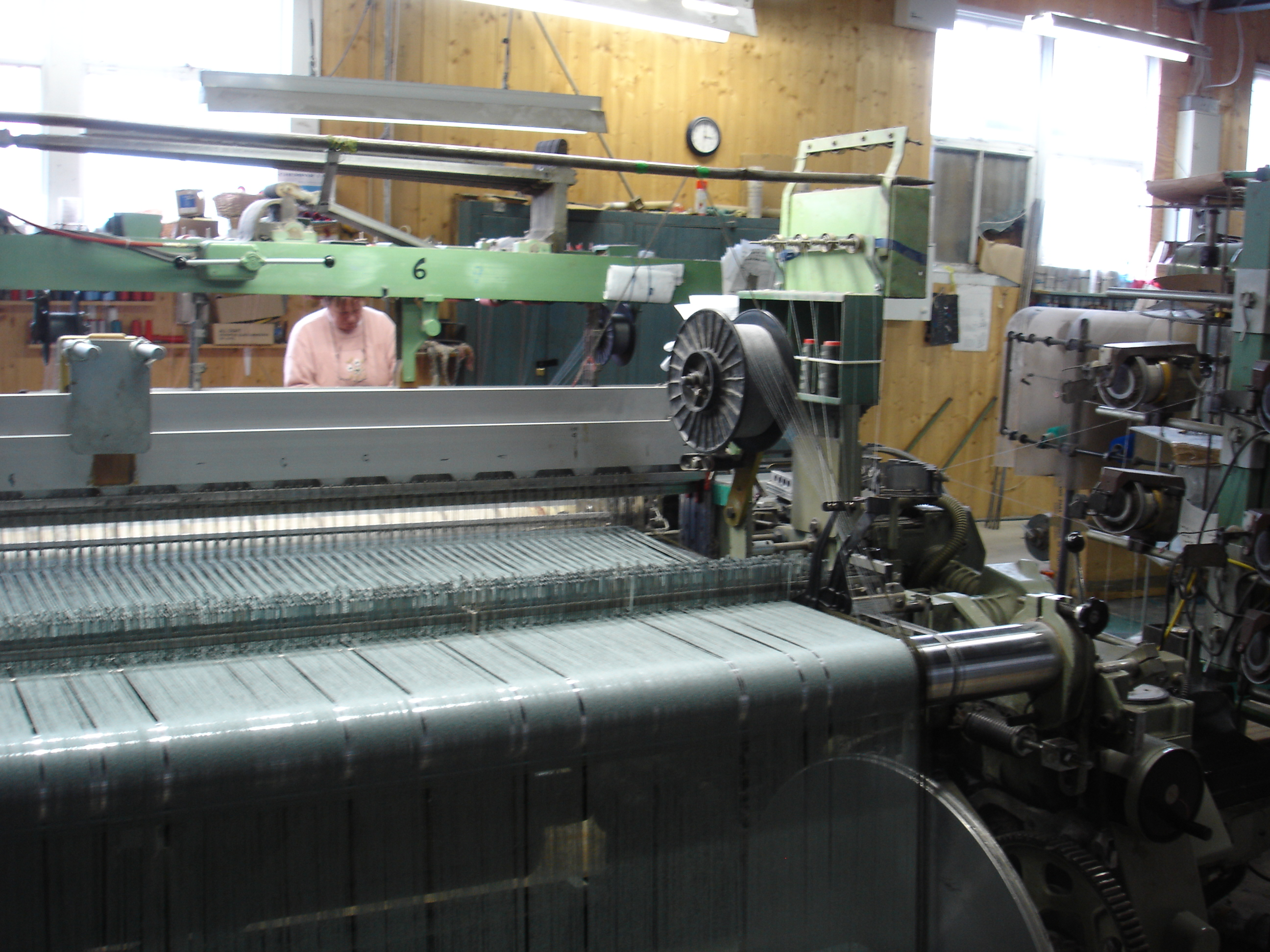
Foxford woollen mill

== See also ==
- List of towns and villages in Ireland
