= Lough Cullin =

Lake in County Mayo, Ireland

- Loch Cuilinn (Irish)
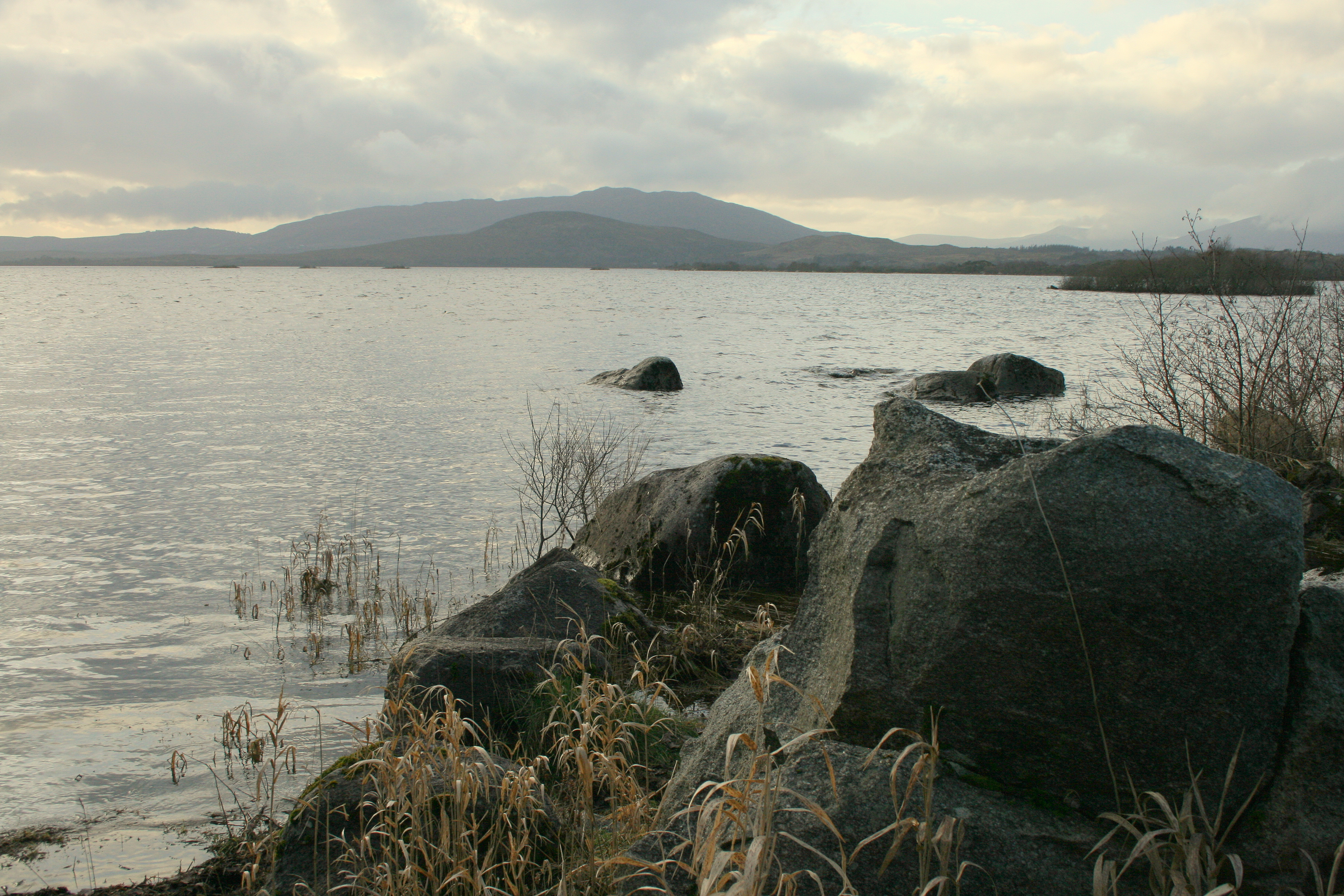
- Lough Cullin with Nephin range in the background.

- Location in Ireland
- Location: County Mayo
- Coordinates: 53°58′13″N 9°10′28″W
- Primary outflows: River Moy
- Catchment area: 802.81 km^{2} (309.97 sq mi)
- Basin countries: Ireland
- Surface area: 10.24 km^{2} (3.95 sq mi)
- Surface elevation: 9 m (30 ft)
- Settlements: Pontoon, Foxford

Lough Cullin (Irish: Loch Cuilinn, meaning 'holly lake') is a lake in County Mayo in Ireland. With its immediate neighbour to the north, Lough Conn, it is connected to the Atlantic by the River Moy. Lough Cullin is noted for its trout and salmon fishing.

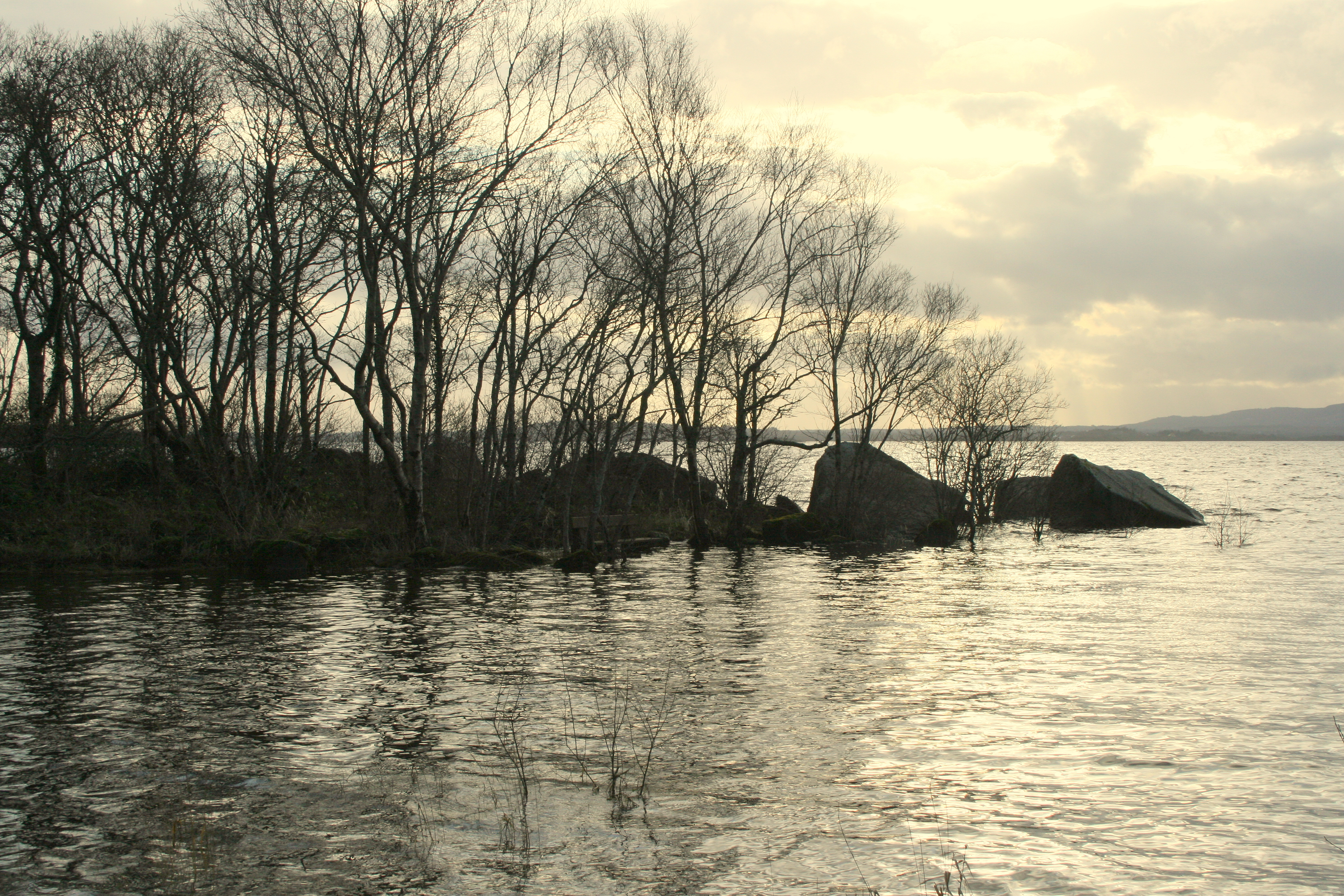
Cullin, looking southwest

In Celtic mythology, Lough Cullin was created when Fionn mac Cumhaill was hunting with his hounds; Cullin and Conn. They came across a wild boar. Finn and the hounds attempted to chase it. However, as the boar ran, water poured from its feet. The hounds ran ahead of Finn and eventually Conn was ahead of Cullin. Conn chased the boar for days until a lake appeared. The boar swam back to land but Conn was drowned. This happened again in the south to Cullin.

== See also ==
- List of loughs in Ireland
