= Pontoon, County Mayo =

Pontoon Pontún
- Village
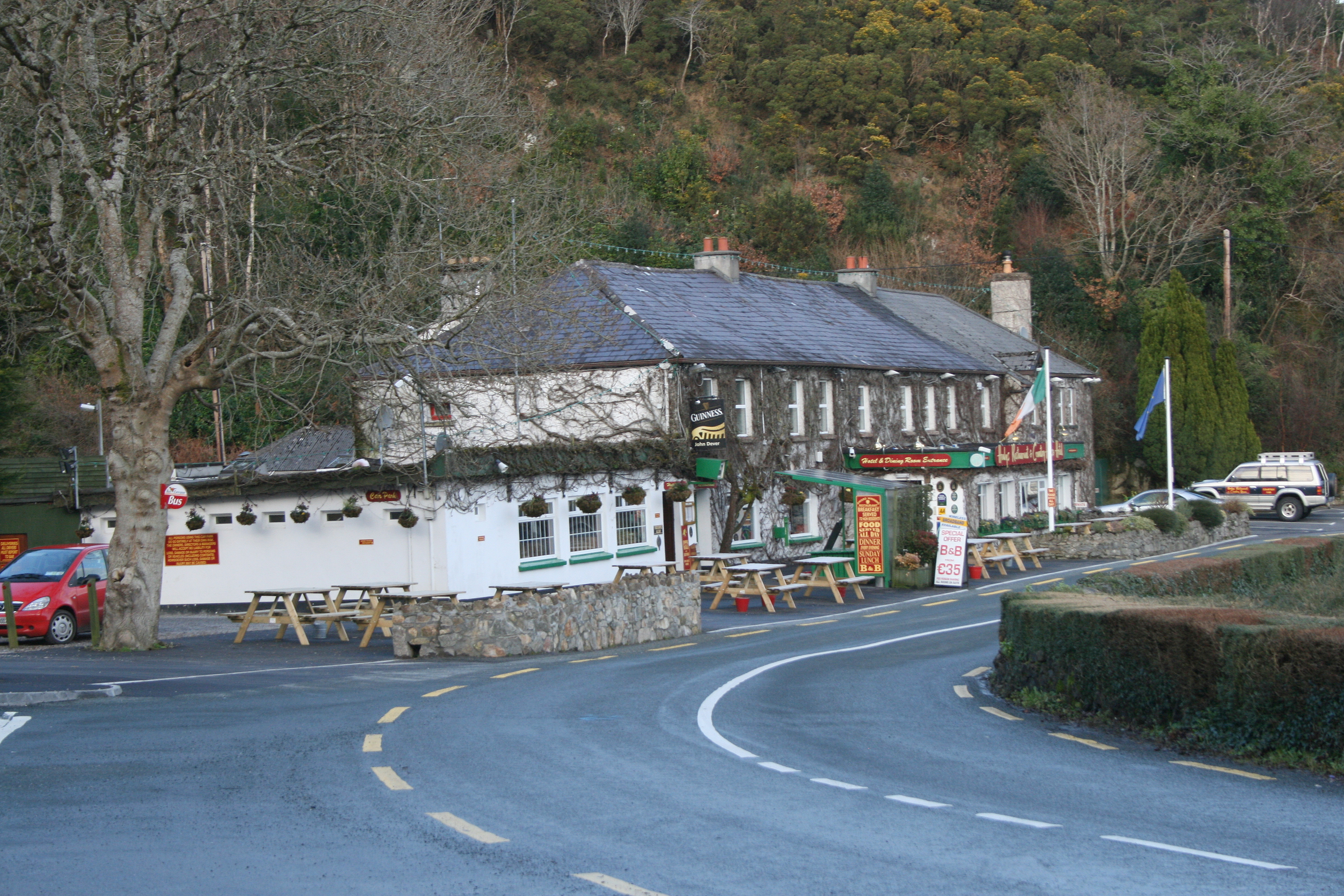
- Healy's Hotel in Pontoon on the banks of Lough Cullin

- Location in Ireland
- Coordinates: 53°58′25″N 9°12′42″W
- Country: Ireland
- Province: Connacht
- County: County Mayo
- Elevation: 72 m (236 ft)
- Time zone: UTC+0 (WET)
  - Summer (DST): UTC-1 (IST (WEST))
- Irish Grid Reference: G205033

Pontoon (Irish: Pontún) is a lakeside village on the R310 regional road in County Mayo in Ireland, situated between Lough Conn and Lough Cullin, and near the town of Foxford and the village of Lahardane.

The dance hall in Pontoon attracted large numbers of people to its weekend dances from a large catchment area.

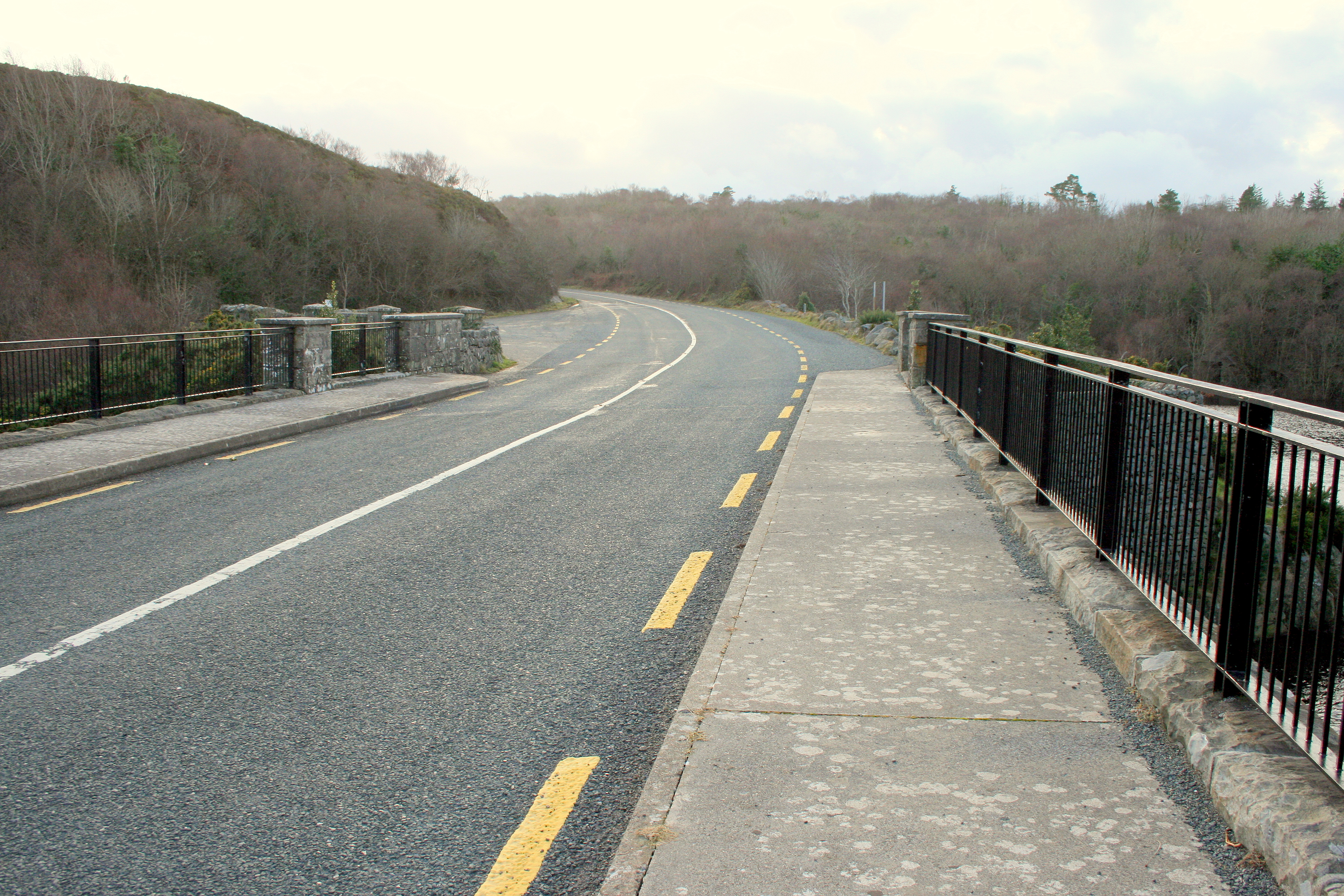
Pontoon Bridge on the R310

== See also ==
- List of towns and villages in Ireland
