= Corroy =

Corroy may refer to:

- Corroy, County Mayo, Ireland
- Corroy, Marne, France
- Alexis of Nassau-Corroy, bastard son of Henry III of Nassau-Breda
- Castle of Corroy-le-Château
