= Bellavary =

Village in County Mayo, Ireland

Bellavary (Ballyvary) Béal Átha Bhearaigh
- Village
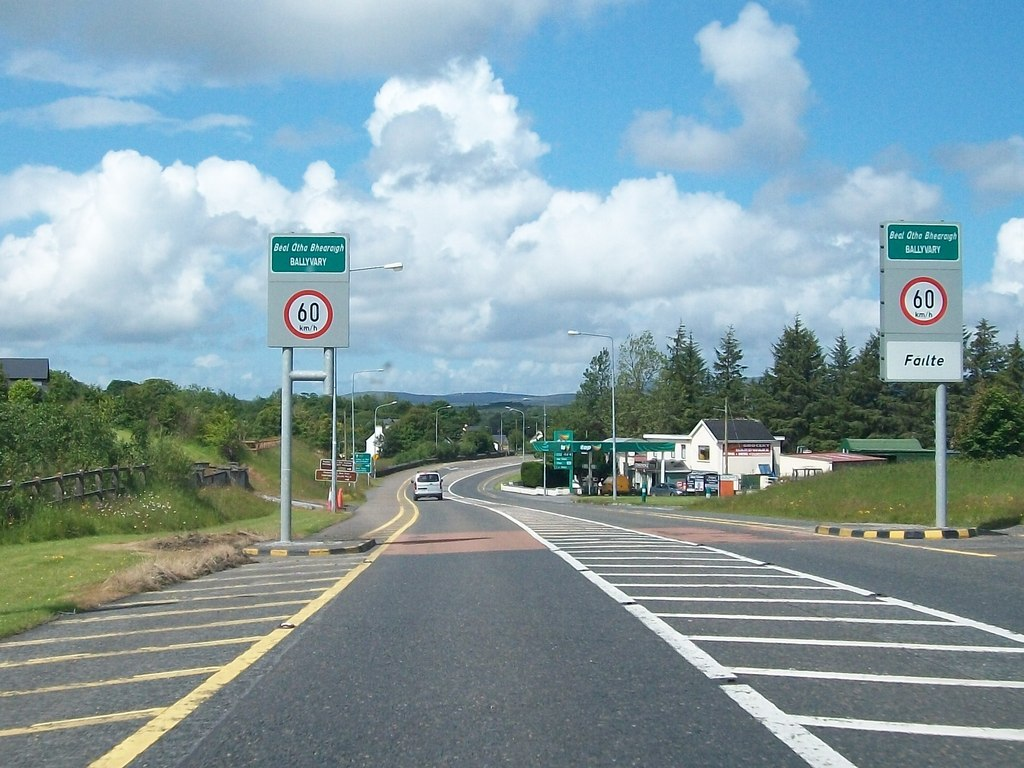
- Entering Ballyvary on the N5

- Location in Ireland
- Coordinates: 53°53′37″N 9°08′57″W
- Country: Ireland
- Province: Connacht
- County: County Mayo
- Elevation: 62 m (203 ft)

Population (2016)
  - Total: 159
- Irish Grid Reference: M244943

Bellavary (Irish: Béal Átha Bhearaigh), more widely known as Ballyvary, is a village in County Mayo, Ireland. It is situated on the N5 road between Swinford and Castlebar (11 kilometres (7 mi) north-east of the latter), close to Foxford and the River Moy. At the 2016 census, Ballyvary had a population of 159. It stands near where the Turlough River, the railway and the N5 converge. It is a townland in the Parish of Keelogues.

== Transport ==
Ballyvary railway station opened on 19 June 1894, but finally closed on 17 June 1963.

== Ballyvary Blue Bombers FC ==
Bellavary's soccer team, the Ballyvary Blue Bombers, have been playing in the Mayo League since 1986. They are an amateur club and today field teams at underage and junior levels. The club had its origins in McKeowns field in Knocksaxon where its early games were played. Today the club play in the Community Pitch in Laghtavarry,Keelogues.The mens team play in the Killeen Sports Ground League One,the third tier of football in the Mayo League.

== Ballyvary Hurling Club ==
Ballyvary Hurling Club was formed in 2005. As well as the Ballyvary Blue Bombers, they play their games at the Community Pitch in Keelogues.

== See also ==
- List of towns and villages in Ireland
