= N68 =

N68 may refer to:

== Roads ==
- Andaya Highway, in the Philippines
- N68 road (Ireland)
- Nebraska Highway 68, in the United States

== Other uses ==
- Escadrille N.68, a unit of the French Air Force
- Franklin County Regional Airport, in Pennsylvania, United States
- HMS Truant (N68), a submarine of the Royal Navy
- London Buses route N68
