= Laura Bernal =

Laura Bernal may refer to:

- Laura Bernal (diplomat) (1956–2020), Argentine diplomat
- Laura Bernal (tennis) (born 1978), Paraguayan tennis player
