= Lough Conn =

Lake in County Mayo, Ireland

- Loch Con (Irish)
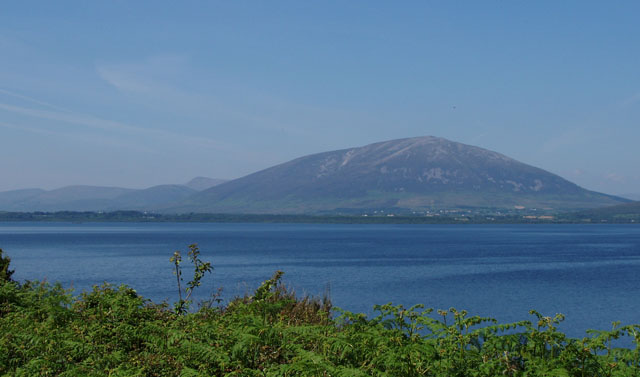
- Lough Conn with Nephin in the background

- Location of Lough Conn in Ireland
- Location: County Mayo
- Coordinates: 54°02′36″N 9°14′42″W
- Primary outflows: River Moy
- Catchment area: 416.48 km^{2} (160.80 sq mi)
- Basin countries: Ireland
- Surface area: 48.48 km^{2} (18.72 sq mi)
- Surface elevation: 9 m (30 ft)
- Settlements: Crossmolina; Foxford; Lahardane; Pontoon

Lough Conn (Irish: Loch Con, meaning 'lake of the hound') is a lake in County Mayo, Ireland. With an area of about 48 square kilometres (19 sq mi), it is Ireland's seventh largest lake. With its immediate neighbour to the south, Lough Cullin, it is connected to the Atlantic Ocean by the River Moy. Lough Conn is noted for its trout and salmon fishing. The ruins of a priory exist at Errew Abbey.

== Name ==
In Gaelic mythology, various accounts are given of the origin of the name.

In one account, Lough Conn was created when Fionn mac Cumhaill was hunting with his hounds; Conn and Cullin. They came across a wild boar. Fionn and the hounds attempted to chase it. However, as the boar ran, water poured from its feet. The hounds ran ahead of Fionn and eventually Conn was ahead of Cullin. Conn chased the boar for days until a lake appeared. The boar swam back to land but Conn was drowned. This happened again in the south to Cullin.

According to another account, the name means in Irish "the lake of the hounds". The story is that the fierce hounds of the chieftain Modh pursued a wild pig into the lake, where they drowned.

== Location ==
The lake is connected to Lough Cullin by a channel that passes under the R310 regional road at Pontoon. The River Deel flows into Lough Conn and exits Lough Cullin at its southern end near Foxford, joining the River Moy which discharges into the Atlantic at Killala Bay.

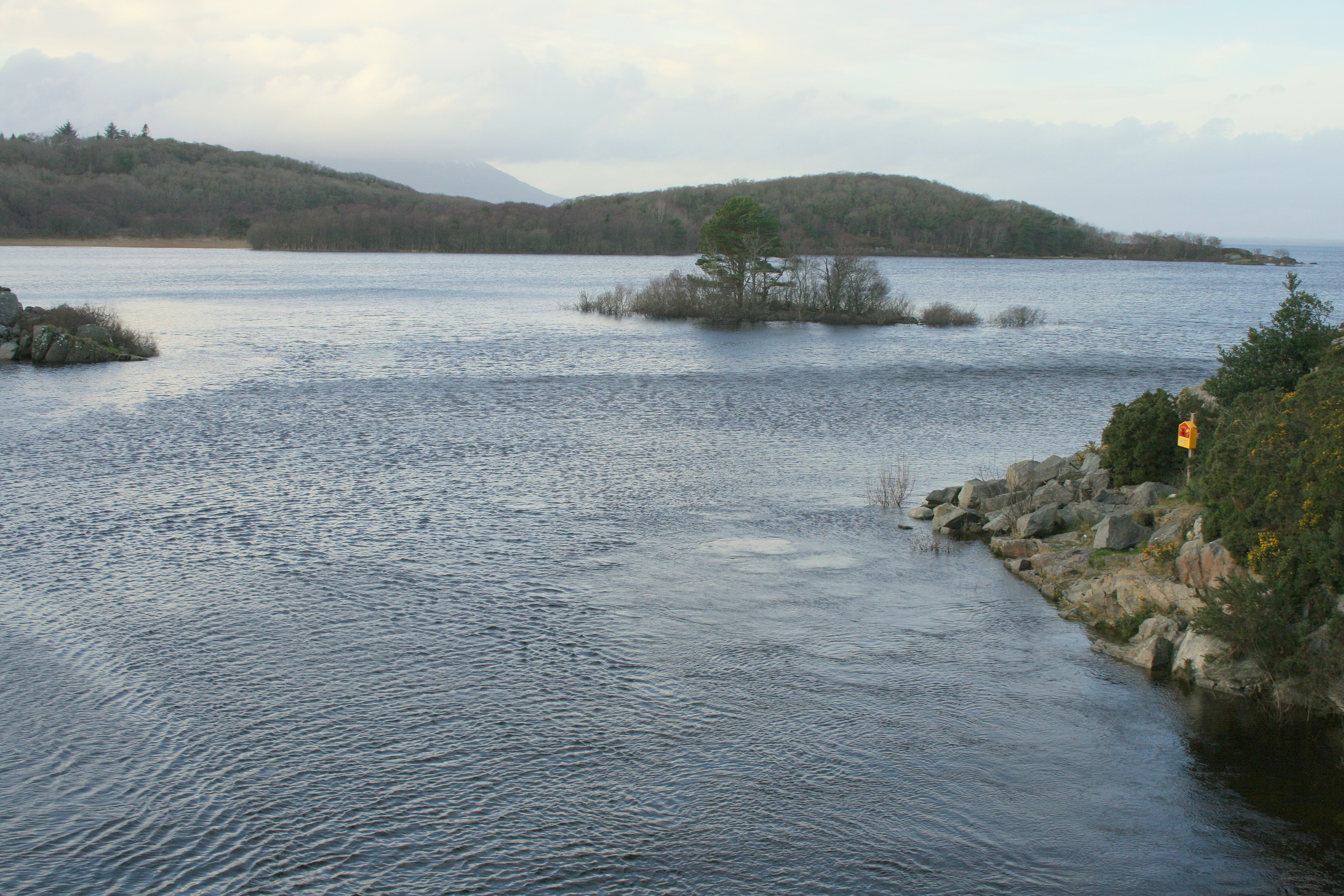
Lough Conn from the R310 bridge at Pontoon

== See also ==
- Ioseph of Loch Con
- List of loughs in Ireland
