= Agnes Bernard =

Agnes Morrogh Bernard
- Mother Mary Joseph Arsenius

Personal life
- Born: 24 February 1842 Cheltenham, England
- Died: 20 April 1932 (aged 90) Foxford, Ireland
- Known for: Foxford convent and mills

Religious life
- Religion: Roman Catholic
- Order: Religious Sisters of Charity

Agnes Morrogh Bernard aka Sister Mary Joseph Arsenius (24 February 1842 – 20 April 1932) was a Roman Catholic nun who founded two convents, and a woollen mill in Foxford, Ireland.

== Life ==
Bernard was born in Cheltenham on 24 February 1842 to John and Frances Mary Morrogh. In 1849, her parents inherited an estate in County Kerry and as a result the family changed their names to Bernard. They were then living in Cork but she and her parents moved to Shehersee House on the Bernard's new estate. In 1854, she undertook formal education at Laurel Hill convent in Limerick. She was there for three years and after a year with her parents she went to Paris to complete her education at the Convent of Dames Anglaises where she chose a religious life. She became a novice at the Religious Sisters of Charity convent in Dublin when she was 21. In 1863, she took the name Sister Mary Joseph Arsenius and professed in 1866. She was initially involved in teaching but then moved on to managerial and administration.

In 1877, a new convent opened in Ballaghaderreen in County Mayo and Bernard was chosen as Reverend Mother. The convent expanded in 1879 to create a national school and in 1866 an industrial school.

== Foxford ==
Moving on from Ballaghaderreen, Bernard went to Foxford on 9 December 1890. She opened another convent in 1891 and took over a national school in the poor town. Bernard obtained £7,000 in funding and opened the Providence Woollen Mill in Foxford in 1892 using power from the River Moy. Vawn Corrigan reports that she was known to be progressive and non-sectarian in her approach while enabled her to get support from skilled Presbyterian sources.

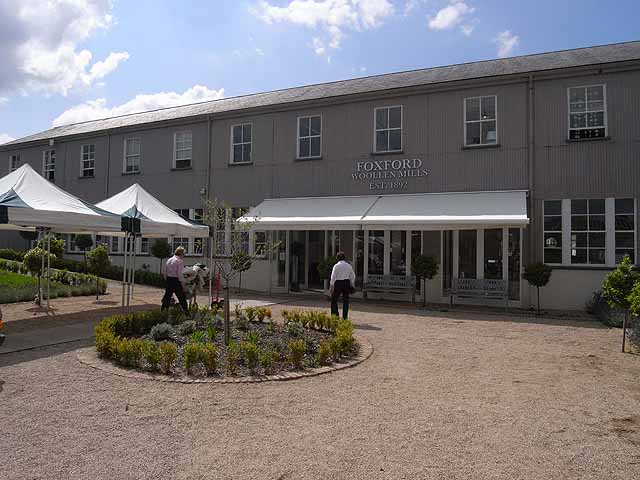
Foxford Woollen Mills in 2014

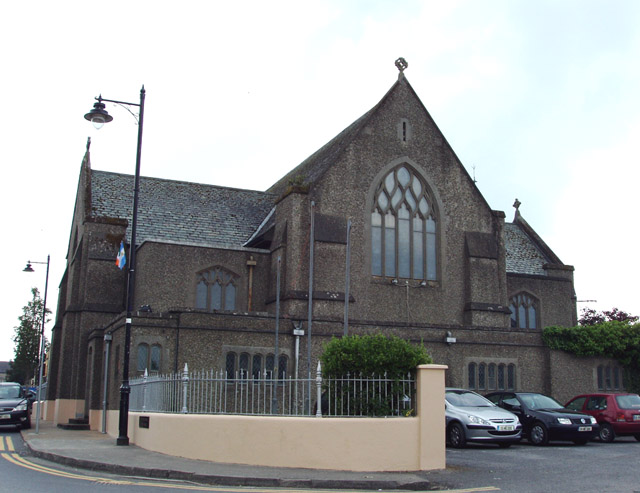
She founded the Convent Church in 1925

Bernard's management and results attracted further funding and the Mill undertook training of their own workers and in time training in other skills pertinent to the local activities. Bernard's organisation instilled new methods of breeding poultry, farming and gardening. In 1897 she created the Brass and Reed Band which was still running in 2014. Bernard tried to avoid politics but she did get involved when Charles Stewart Parnell fell from power and there was disagreements between her workers and the parish priest. She also got involved when some of her workers were victimised by the Black and Tans in 1921. Bernard was able to get the soldiers disciplined. Bernard supported the revival of Gaelic culture and language as she had arranged earlier the building of cottages for workers. She herself organised cart roads to give access to 118 houses. In 1898, Mother Mary Arsenius undertook the task of building roads in the area; through her scheme cart roads were built to the doors of 118 houses. In addition, she encouraged the local authorities to build labourers' cottages. She was also interested in the social and cultural life of the area, and supported the efforts of the Gaelic League to revive Irish language and culture. She died at her convent on 20 April 1932 and was buried there three days later.

== Legacy ==
The Foxford Woollen Mills are still in business and date their founding to Sister Mary Joseph Arsenius.
