= R318 road (Ireland) =

Road in Ireland

R318 road
- Bóthar R318

Route information
- Length: 4.3 km (2.7 mi)

Location
- Country: Ireland
- Primary destinations: County Mayo; Foxford (N26, N58); Crosses Dublin to Ballina railway; Corlummin; Cuingbeg (R310)

Highway system
- Roads in Ireland; Motorways; Primary; Secondary; Regional

The R318 road is a regional road in County Mayo in Ireland. It connects the N26 at Foxford to the R310 at Cuingbeg, 4.3 kilometres (2.7 mi) away (map of the route).

The government legislation that defines the R318, the Roads Act 1993 (Classification of Regional Roads) Order 2012 (Statutory Instrument 54 of 2012), provides the following official description:

Foxford — Pontoon, County Mayo

Between its junction with N26 at Bridge Street Foxford and its junction with R310 at Cuingbeg via Corlummin all in the county of Mayo.

== See also ==
- List of roads of County Mayo
- National primary road
- National secondary road
- Regional road
- Roads in Ireland
