= Lahardane =

Village in County Mayo, Ireland

Lahardane Irish: Leathardán
- Village
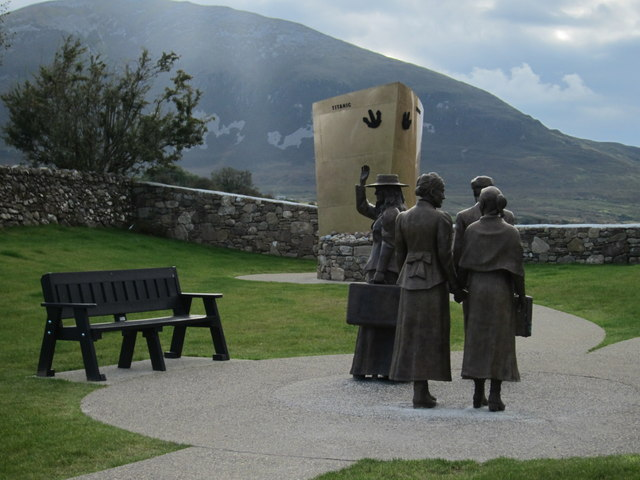
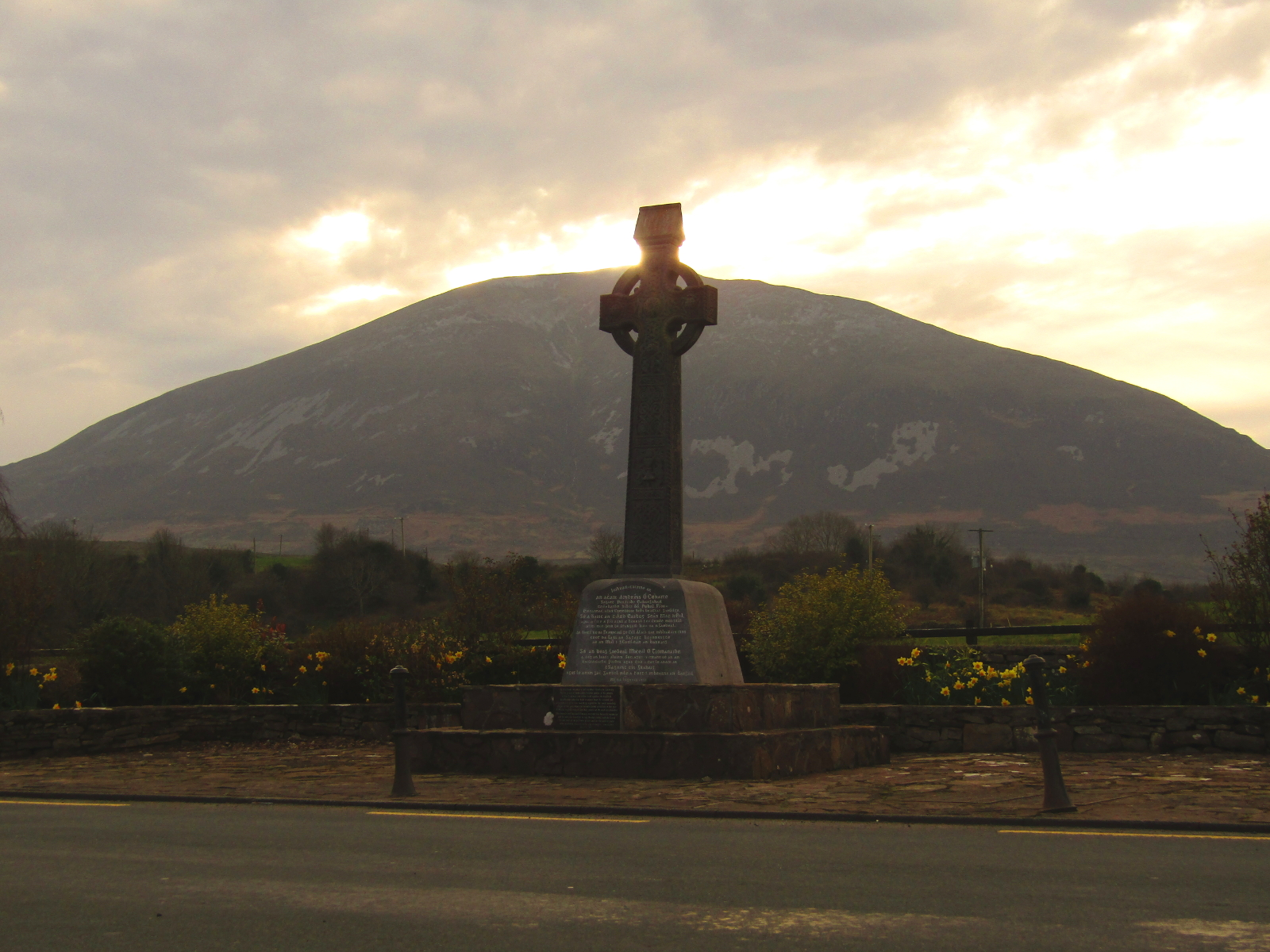
- Top: A section of the Titanic Memorial Park. Bottom: A Celtic Cross commemorating Father Andrew Conroy who was hanged for taking part in the 1798 United Irishmen Rebellion. In the background, the mountain known as Nephin

- Location in Ireland
- Coordinates: 54°02′00″N 9°19′20″W
- Country: Ireland
- Province: Connacht
- County: County Mayo
- Elevation: 47 m (154 ft)

Population (2016)
  - Total: 178
- Time zone: UTC+0 (WET)
  - Summer (DST): UTC-1 (IST (WEST))
- Irish Grid Reference: G133101

Lahardane, also sometimes spelled Lahardaun (Irish: Leathardán, meaning "Half on Hill"), is a village in the parish of Addergoole, County Mayo, Ireland, adjacent to Lough Conn and to Nephin, and close to the towns of Crossmolina, Castlebar and Ballina. The 2016 census recorded a population of 178.

== History ==
Evidence of ancient settlement in the area include a ruined megalithic cist near Knockfarnagh, and a ringfort at Lisgorp.

Historically, the people of Lahardane and the surrounding area helped the French army under General Humbert during the 1798 uprising when the local priest, Fr Andrew Conroy, led French and Irish forces to Castlebar though the Windy Gap, a passage through the Mountains. The British forces had been expecting the French to go to Foxford first, and were caught off-guard. This led to the Races of Castlebar. After the uprising was put down, Fr Conroy was hanged on the Mall in Castlebar, and is most likely buried in the old abbey in Addergoole cemetery. A Celtic cross now stands in Lahardane as a memorial these events. The cross was erected in 1937 by Michéal Ó Tiomanaidhe, the Gaelic scholar, writer and folklore collector who was born in Addergoole parish on 20 September 1853.

In October 2017, the Lahardane GAA team won the Mayo Junior Football Championship for the very first time, and went on to win the Connacht Junior Football Championship in November 2017.

== Culture ==
=== Titanic connection ===
Addergoole parish suffered the largest proportionate loss for any locality probably in the world when the RMS Titanic sank in 1912. The 'Addergoole Fourteen' boarded the ship at Queenstown (Cobh). Three survived the disaster. There is a plaque in St Patrick's Church, Lahardane to the memory of the fourteen, as well as a memorial garden filled with sculptures to honour their memory.

=== Fair day ===
The history of the Lahardane fair goes back to around 1900. It was a traditional harvest festival, as was practised in the West of Ireland at the time, and it was always held on 15 August, a feast day and religious holiday. At that time, it was noted for its tradition in which local farmers hired younger labourers, and was sometimes known as the 'hiring fair'. This tradition died out in the 1920s, and it became a traditional day for the sale of cattle and sheep. This situation prevailed into the 1970s. Later, the Lahardane Parents Council decided to revive the event, and kept tradition with 15 August (resisting the temptation to move it to the nearest weekend). It now runs as a fundraising event for the local national (primary) school.

== Sport ==
The local Gaelic football team is the Lahardane McHales GAA club. Founded in 1966, Lahardane McHales is made up of players drawn from across the parish of Addergoole. Under the management of John Maughan, the club won their first Mayo Junior title in 2017 defeating Kilmaine. They subsequently went on to win the Connacht Junior Football Championship, beating Ballymote of Sligo 1–15 to 3-05.

== People ==
- John MacHale - (1789 – 1881) Catholic Archbishop of Tuam, and Irish nationalist, from whom the local Gaelic football club derives its name. He was born and raised in the area.
- Mamie Cadden - (1891 – 1959) Nurse and abortionist. Born in Scranton, Pennsylvania but her family were from the area and returned early in her life. She attended Lahardane National School and was raised to adulthood in the area.

== See also ==
- List of towns and villages in Ireland
