= R310 road =

R310 road may refer to:

- R310 road (Ireland)
- R310 road (South Africa)
