= R318 road =

R318 road may refer to:

- R318 road (South Africa)
- R318 road (Ireland), a regional road of Ireland
