= N58 road (Ireland) =

Road in Ireland

N58 road
- Bóthar N58

Route information
- Length: 11.259 km (6.996 mi)

Location
- Country: Ireland
- Primary destinations: Foxford (N26), Straide, Bellavary (N5): County Mayo; Ballina; Castlebar

Highway system
- Roads in Ireland; Motorways; Primary; Secondary; Regional

The N58 road is a national secondary road in Ireland. It links the N26 national primary road at Foxford in Co Mayo to the N5 national primary road at Bellavary, 11km to the south. As such it forms part of the main route linking the three largest towns in Co Mayo - Castlebar and Westport on the N5 and Ballina on the N26.

== Route ==
- Foxford (N26) – (N5 between Swinford and Castlebar)

== See also ==
- Roads in Ireland
- Motorways in Ireland
- National primary road
- Regional road
