= National secondary road =

Road classification system in Ireland

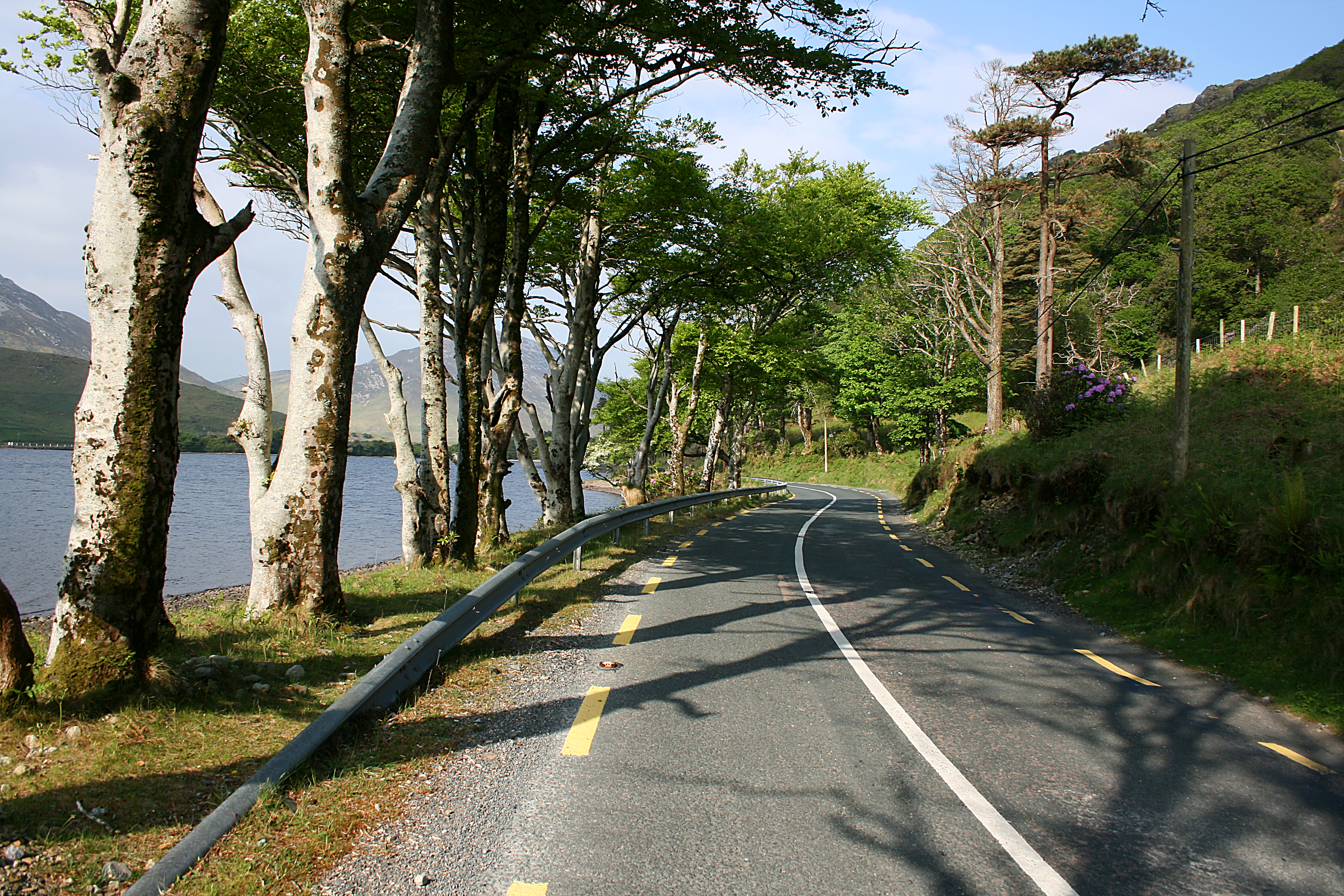
The N59 on the shore of Kylemore Lough in County Galway

A national secondary road (Irish: bóthar náisiúnta den dara grád) is a category of road in Ireland. These roads form an important part of the national route network but are secondary to the main arterial routes which are classified as national primary roads. National secondary roads are designated with route numbers higher than those used for primary roads, but with the same "N" prefix. Routes N51 and higher are all national secondary roads.

National secondary roads have a default speed limit of 100km/h, but this is planned to reduce to 80km/h in 2025 under the Road Traffic Act 2024 following recommendations from a review of speed limits carried out by the Department of Transport in 2023.

There are 2657 km of national secondary roads in Ireland, making up slightly over 50% of the entire national route (national primary and national secondary) network. National secondary routes are generally more poorly maintained than primary routes (although their quality can vary widely), but often carry more traffic than regional roads. Almost the entire network of national secondary roads is single carriageway, although there are some short sections of dual carriageway on the Tallaght bypass section of the N81, on the N52 at Dundalk, on the N85 at Ennis, on the N62 at Athlone, on both the N69 and N70 at Tralee and on the N71 between Cork and Bandon. Typically, national secondary roads are of a similar standard or higher than regional roads although some are of lower quality than the better sections of regional roads. Many of them have been resurfaced with higher quality pavements in recent years with relatively smooth surfaces and good road markings and signposting. However, road widths and alignments are often inadequate, with many narrow and winding sections.

In the past, most national secondary roads ran through the centres of the towns on their routes; however, recently, that is less often the case. For example:

- The N52 bypasses Nenagh (together with the M7), Tullamore, Mullingar, Kells and the centre of Dundalk (as a relief road)
- The N55 (together with the N3) bypasses Cavan.
- The N56 forms part of the Donegal bypass and the Mountcharles bypass.
- The N69 and N70 form part of the Tralee bypass.
- The N71 bypasses Halfway and Skibbereen.
- The N74 (together with the M8) bypasses Cashel.
- The N76 bypasses Callan.
- The N77 forms the northern part of the Kilkenny ring road.
- The N80 bypasses Carlow.
- The N85 bypasses Ennis (together with the M18).

The former N8 bypass of Mitchelstown was re-classified as the N73 when the Fermoy (Moorepark) to Kilbehenny section of the M8 was completed.

Most national secondary roads were originally Trunk Roads under the old system of road classification in Ireland, although some sections of national secondary routes were formerly Link Roads. Many less important Trunk Roads became regional roads when the road classification system changed from 1977 onward, including some roads, such as the N72 between Killarney and Killorglin, the N86 and the N87, which were originally re-classified as regional roads but later re-classified again as national secondary routes. In 1994, three national secondary roads were reclassified as national primary roads: the N57 between Swinford and Ballina became the N26, the N64 between Oranmore and Claregalway became part of the N18 and the N79 between New Ross and Enniscorthy became the N30. In addition, a section of the N60 between Castlebar and Westport became part of the N5.

Some national secondary roads, though not arterial routes between major cities, connect scenic areas to major population centres. For example, the N59 through County Galway and County Mayo, the N70 road through County Kerry (see Ring of Kerry) and the N71 through West Cork. For this reason, many national secondary roads are well-travelled by tourists.

== List of national secondary roads ==
(XXXX) = Junction with road XXXX, e.g. (N21) = Junction with N21 road

National secondary roads in Ireland
Road name	Description	Length (km)	Length (mi)
N51	(M1) west of Drogheda – Slane (N2) – Navan (M3) – Athboy – Delvin (N52 to Mullingar)	52.994	32.929
N52	Ardee (N2) – Kells (N3) – Delvin (N51) – Mullingar – (Joins M6) near Tyrrellspass – (Leaves M6) near Kilbeggan – Durrow – Tullamore (N80) – Birr (N62) – Borrisokane (N65) – (M7 west of Nenagh)	177.694	110.414
N53	Dundalk to Castleblayney (a short section of the road becomes the A37 where it runs through County Armagh)	18.122	11.260
N54	Monaghan (N2) – Clones – Cavan (N3) (a short section of the road becomes the A3 where it runs through County Fermanagh)	34.626	21.516
N55	(N3 just outside Cavan) – Granard – Edgeworthstown (N4) – (N6 Athlone ringroad)	78.815	48.973
N56	(N15 just east of Donegal) – (R263 near Killybegs) – Glenties – Dungloe – Gweedore – Dunfanaghy – Letterkenny (N14)	157.304	97.744
N58	Foxford (N26) – (N5 between Swinford and Castlebar)	11.259	6.996
N59	(N4 to Sligo) – Ballina (N26) – Bangor Erris – Rosturk – Westport (N5) – Clifden – Oughterard – Moycullen bypass – Galway (N6)	298.795	185.663
N60	Castlebar – Claremorris (N17) – Ballyhaunis – Castlerea – Ballymoe – Roscommon	92.217	57.301
N61	Athlone (N6) – Knockcroghery – Roscommon – Tulsk (N5) – Boyle (N4)	74.193	46.101
N62	M6 near Athlone to M8 at Horse and Jockey) M6 – Ferbane – Cloghan – Birr – Roscrea – Templemore – Thurles – Horse and Jockey (M8)	96.625	60.040
N63	(N63 Galway city to Longford town) Galway – Claregalway – Lackagh – Turloughmore – Abbeyknockmoy – Moylough – Mountbellew – Newbridge – Ballygar – Mount Talbot – Athleague – Roscommon – Lanesborough-Ballyleague – Longford (N5)	96.393	59.896
N65	M6 north of Loughrea to N52 at Borrisokane; crossing the River Shannon at Portumna	52.517	32.633
N67	Galway – Kinvara – Ballyvaughan – Lisdoonvarna – Ennistymon (N85) – Kilkee – Kilrush (N68) – (ferry pier near Killimer) (ferry pier near Tarbert) – Tarbert (N69)	129.172	80.264
N68	Kilrush to Ennis	40.569	25.208
N69	Dock Road (Limerick) – Mungret – Clarina – Kildimo – (Askeaton) – Foynes – Tarbert (N67) – Listowel – Tralee (N21, N22, N70, N86)	97.476	60.569
N70	(Comprises most of the Ring of Kerry) – (N70 Killarney Road at Kenmare) – Sneem – Castlecove – Caherdaniel – Waterville – Cahersiveen – Killorglin – (N72) – Milltown – Castlemaine – (N86) – (N21, N69) Tralee	141.691	88.043
N71	(N22) Cork (Wilton Road, Bishopstown Road, Bandon Road) – Halfway bypass – Innishannon – Bandon – Ballinascarty – Clonakilty – Rosscarbery – Leap – Skibbereen – (R592 to Ballydehob) – Bantry – Ballylickey – Glengarriff – Kenmare – (N70) – Muckross – Killarney (N22, N72)	187.270	116.364
N72	Killorglin – Killarney (N22) – Rathmore – Mallow (N20) – Fermoy (M8) – Lismore – Dungarvan (N25)	165.923	103.100
N73	Mitchelstown (M8) – (N72 east of Mallow)	34.296	21.311
N74	(M8) Cashel – Golden – Kilfeakle – Tipperary (N24)	19.915	12.375
N75	Thurles to the M8 near Two-Mile Borris	7.552	4.693
N76	(N10) Kilkenny Ring Road – Ballymack – Callan bypass – Ninemilehouse – (N24 east of Clonmel)	43.686	27.145
N77	(N10) Kilkenny Ring Road – (N78) – Ballyragget – (M7) at Portlaoise	48.742	30.287
N78	(N77) – Castlecomer – (N80) – Athy – (M9) near Ballitore	50.671	31.485
N80	(N52) near Tullamore – Mountmellick – crosses the (M7) at Portlaoise (connects to M7 via R445) – Stradbally – (N78) Carlow – (M9) near Tinryland – (N81) – Kildavin – Bunclody – (N11) near Enniscorthy	114.683	71.261
N81	(M50) at Templeogue – Tallaght Bypass – Baltinglass – Tullow – (N80 just east of Ballon)	76.784	47.711
N83	Tuam – Dunmore – Cloonfad – Ballyhaunis – Tooreen – N17 south of Charlestown	45.222	28.100
N84	Galway – Cloonboo – Headford – Shrule – Kilmaine – Ballinrobe – Castlebar	73.545	45.699
N85	Ennis (M18) – Ennistymon (N67)	31.858	19.796
N86	Tralee – Annascaul – Lispole – Dingle	50.235	31.215
N87	Belturbet (N3) – Ballyconnell – Swanlinbar – (border with Northern Ireland where it becomes the A32)	28.136	17.483
Total length of network:		2,657	1,651

=== Defunct routes ===
- N57: Swinford – Ballina; upgraded to a primary route as the N26 in 1994.
- N64: Oranmore – Claregalway; upgraded to primary route status as the N18, but after the M18/M17 route was completed to Tuam in 2017, it was downgraded to the R381.
- N66: Gort – Loughrea; downgraded to the R380 in 2017 after the M18 was extended to the M6.
- N79: Enniscorthy – New Ross; upgraded to a primary route as the N30 in 1994.
- N82: N7 to the N81 in southwest Dublin; redesignated as the L2011 in 2012.

== Gallery ==
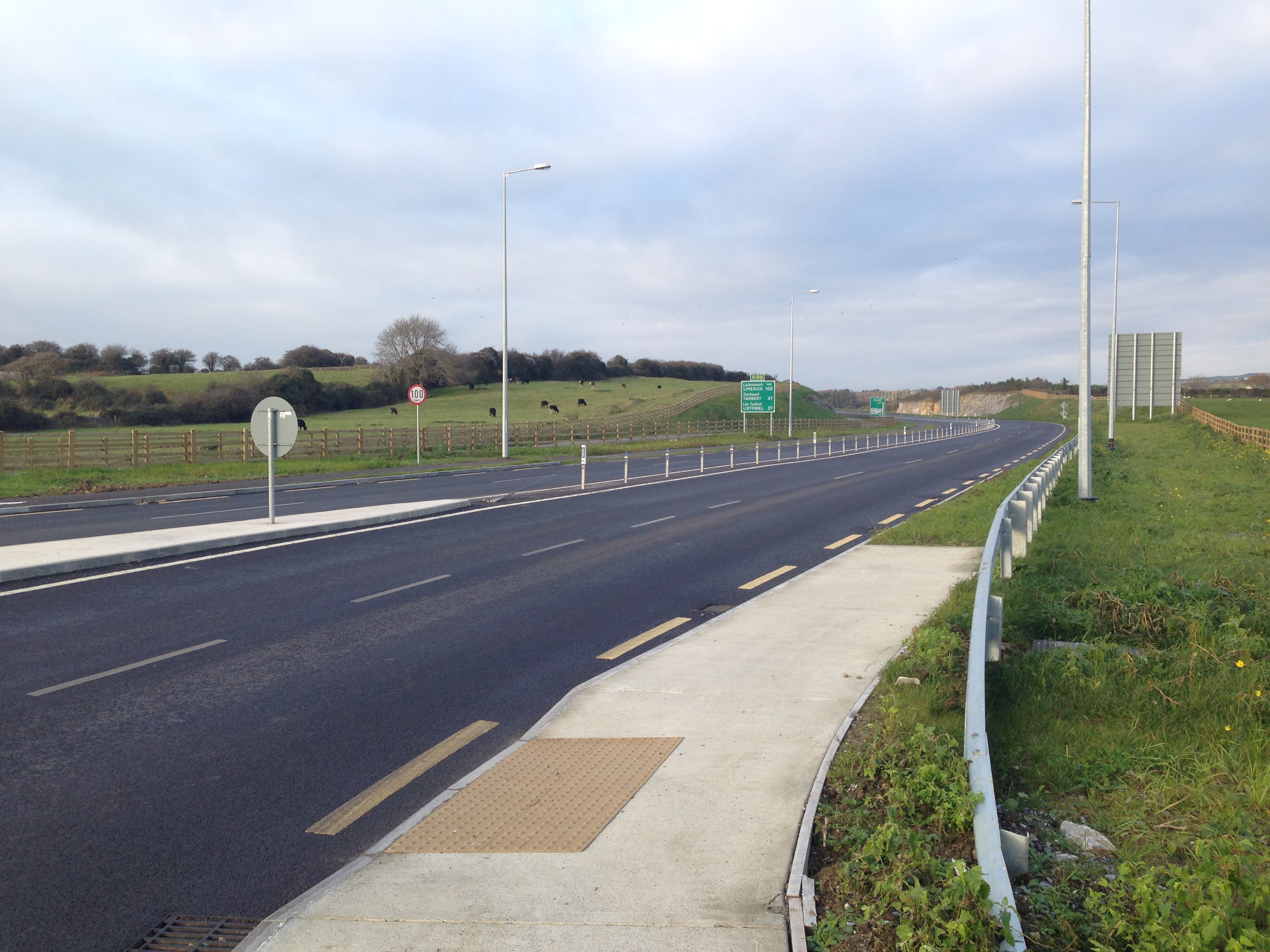
N69, Tralee Bypass, County Kerry

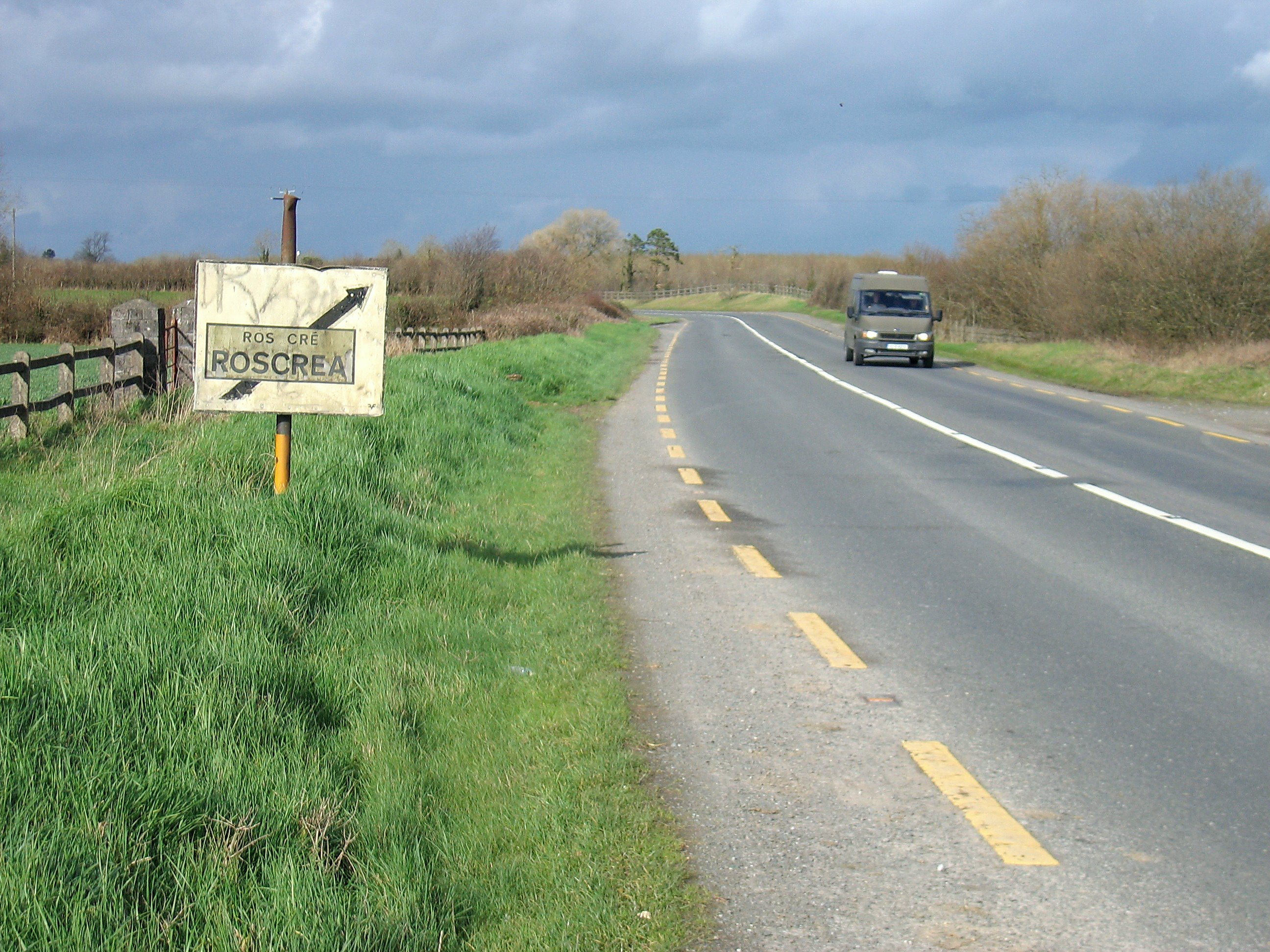
N62, County Tipperary

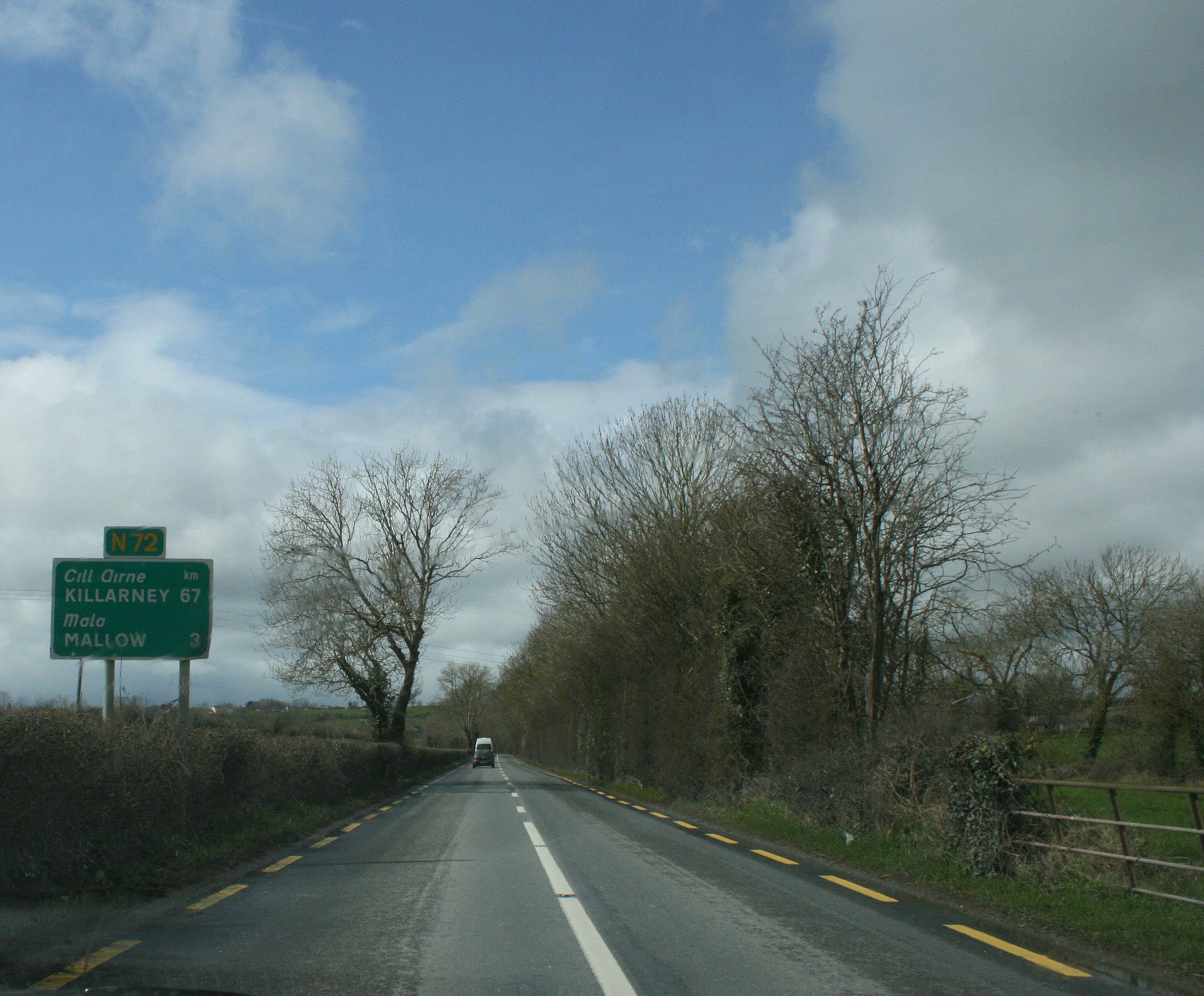
N72, near Mallow, County Cork

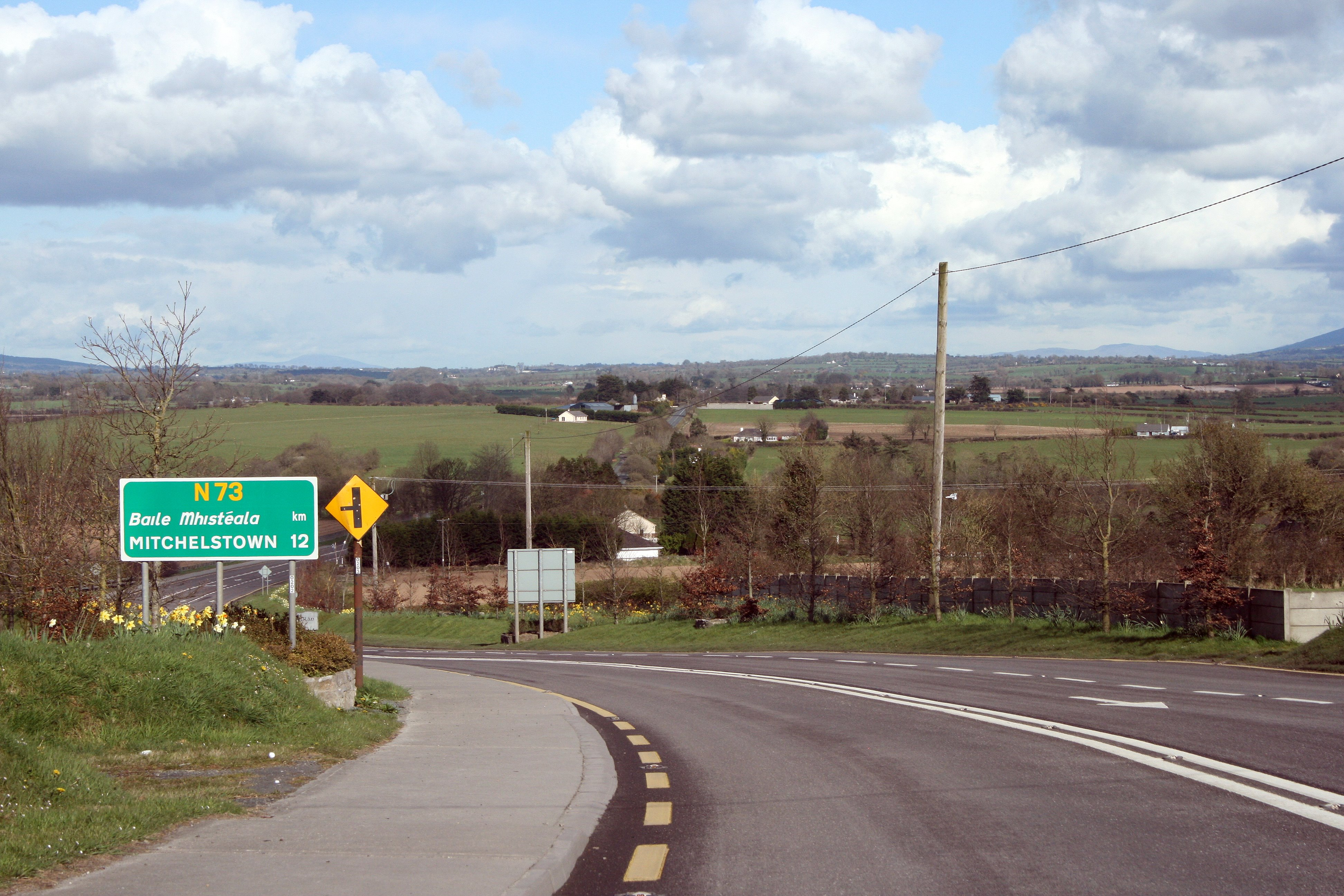
N73, Kildorrery, County Cork

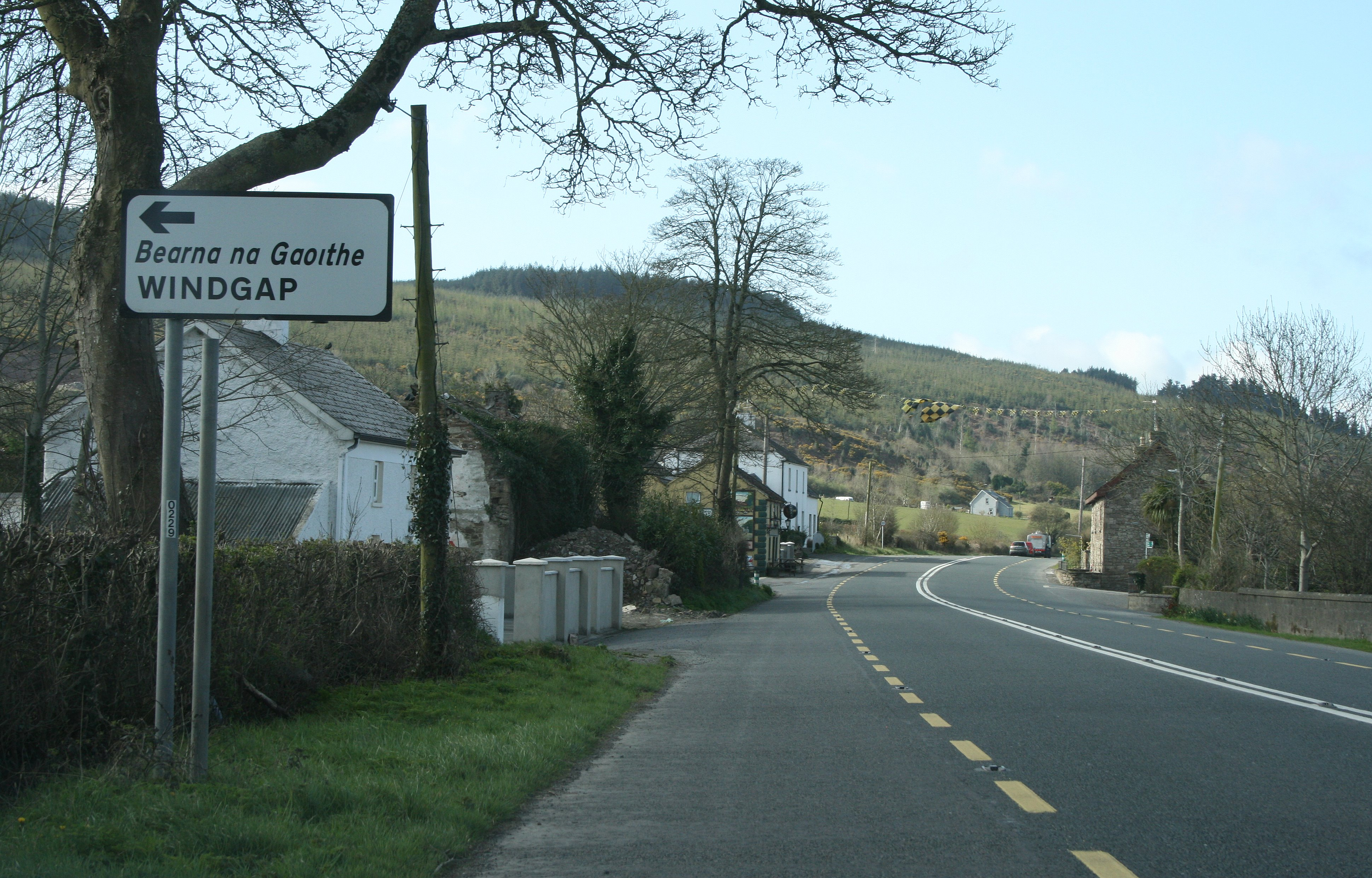
N76, Killamery, County Kilkenny

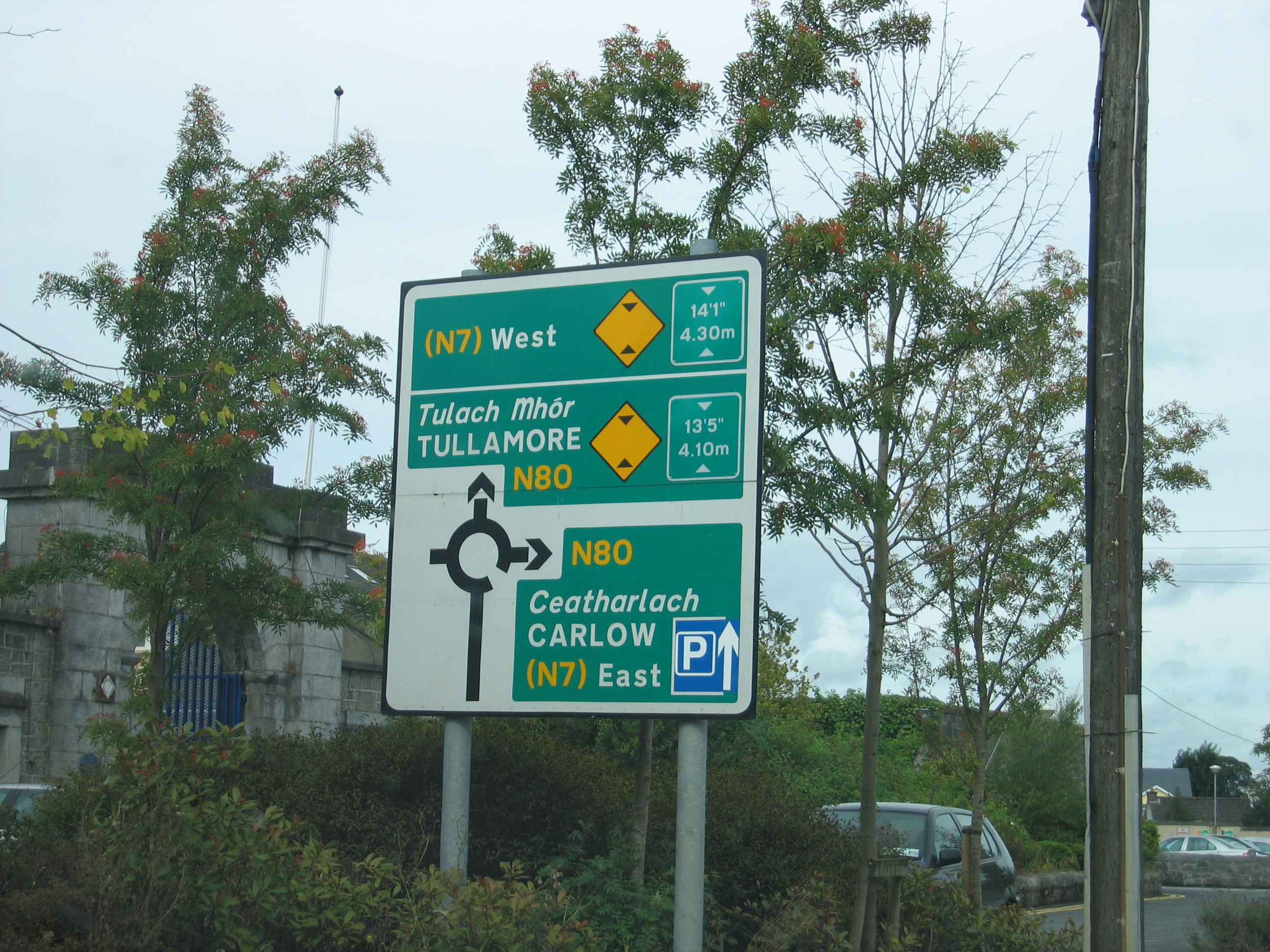
Signpost at N80, Portlaoise

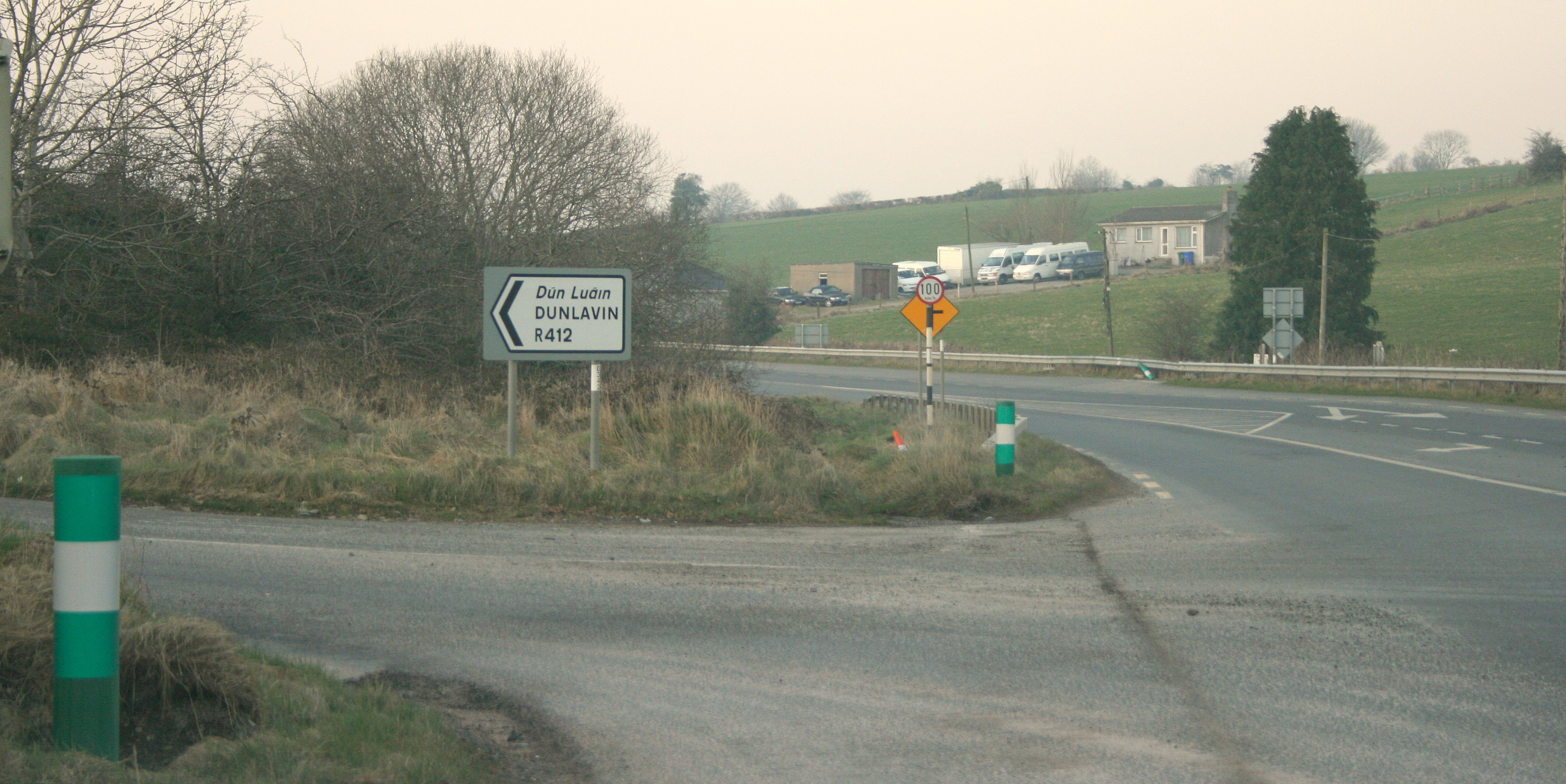
N81 at its junction with the R412 in County Wicklow

== See also ==
- Roads in Ireland
- Motorways in the Republic of Ireland
- National primary road
