= John Feeney (tenor) =

Irish tenor

John Feeney (9 August 1903 – December 1967) was an Irish tenor, performing mainly in lieder and folk song arrangements.

== Biography ==
Feeney was a native of Swinford, County Mayo. After nine years working in England as a labourer, in 1928 he emigrated to the United States, where for thirty years he was one of the leading Irish-American musicians, rated alongside Michael Coleman, James Morrison and The Flanagan Brothers. He became a labelmate of Count Basie, Louis Armstrong, and Bing Crosby on Decca Record Company, and was a regular performer on The Shaefer Show on radio.

Feeney's voice was described as easy, warm and relaxed, his repertoire including Irish favourites such as "Galway Bay" and "Moonlight in Mayo", as well as recitals of Mozart, Handel and Schubert lieder. He regularly played sold-out performances in Carnegie Hall.

John Feeney returned to Ireland in 1964, where he died three years later. He was buried on Christmas Eve, 1967, in a family grave in Ballina, County Mayo.
