= Laura Bernal (diplomat) =

Argentine diplomat (1956–2020)

Argentine Ambassador to Ireland
- In office 2016 – 26 April 2020
- Succeeded by: Moira Wilkinson

Personal details
- Born: 1956 Argentina
- Died: 26 April 2020 (aged 63–64) Rathmines, Dublin, Ireland
- Resting place: Foxford, County Mayo, Ireland
- Occupation: Diplomat

Laura Bernal (1956 – 26 (Note: The Irish Times gave her date of death as 27 April. However, other sources — including the subject's own death notice — gave her date of death as 26 April.) April 2020) was an Argentine diplomat. She served as Argentina's ambassador to Ireland from 2016 until her sudden death in 2020. She was present in the country for her compatriot Pope Francis's visit to Ireland as part of World Meeting of Families 2018.

Bernal was from Buenos Aires. She died at her Rathmines home on 26 April 2020 and was found post-mortem to have contracted COVID-19. At the request of her sister and due to the COVID-19 pandemic in the Republic of Ireland, Bernal's body was not repatriated. Her funeral took place on 15 May at St Michael's parish church in Foxford and she was buried afterwards at nearby Craggagh Cemetery. Foxford is where Admiral William Brown (who founded the Argentine Navy) was born, hence this choice.
