= Corroy, County Mayo =

Corroy Corr Ráithe
- Village
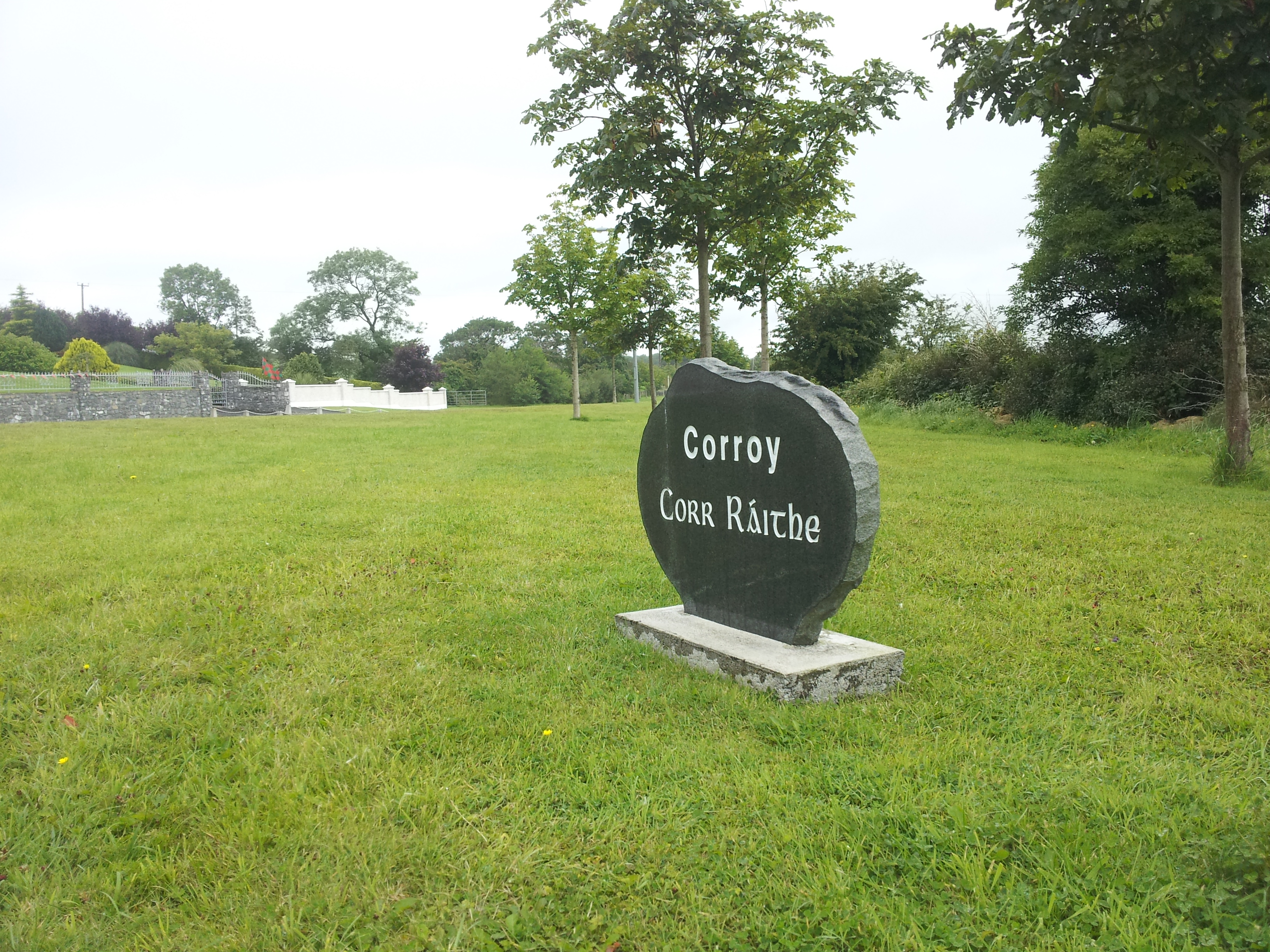
- Corroy placename stone

- Location in Ireland
- Coordinates: 54°03′58″N 9°10′55″W
- Country: Ireland
- Province: Connacht
- County: County Mayo
- Elevation: 7 m (23 ft)
- Time zone: UTC+0 (WET)
  - Summer (DST): UTC-1 (IST (WEST))
- Irish Grid Reference: G229135

Corroy (Irish: Corr Ráithe, meaning 'round-hill fort') is a village in County Mayo in Ireland. It lies on the R310 regional road between the town of Ballina and the village of Knockmore in the Parish of Backs.

== See also ==
- List of towns and villages in Ireland
