= N68 road (Ireland) =

Road in Ireland

Coordinates: 52°42′10″N 9°17′12″W

N68 road
- Bóthar N68

Route information
- Length: 40.569 km (25.208 mi)

Location
- Country: Ireland
- Primary destinations: County Clare; Ennis; Lisseycasey; Kilrush

Highway system
- Roads in Ireland; Motorways; Primary; Secondary; Regional

The N68 road is a national secondary road in Ireland. It runs from Ennis to Kilrush. It is entirely in County Clare.

== See also ==
- Roads in Ireland
- Motorways in Ireland
- National primary road
- Regional road
