= N5 road (Ireland) =

Road in Ireland

N5 road
- Bóthar N5
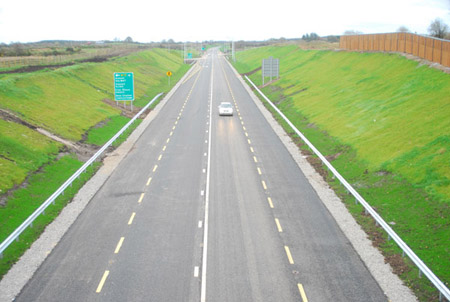
- Charlestown bypass on the N5 in County Mayo

Route information
- Length: 132 km (82 mi)

Location
- Country: Ireland
- Primary destinations: (bypassed towns in italics): County Longford; Longford (N4) (N63); Cloondara; County Roscommon; Termonbarry; Strokestown †; Tulsk † (N61); Bellanagare †; Frenchpark; Ballaghaderreen; County Mayo; Carracastle; Charlestown (N17); Swinford (N26); Bohola †; Bellavary † (N58); Turlough; Castlebar (N60),(N84); Westport (N59); † Bypasses planned.

Highway system
- Roads in Ireland; Motorways; Primary; Secondary; Regional

The N5 road is a national primary road in Ireland, connecting Longford town with Westport. It is the main access route from Dublin (via the M4/N4) to most of County Mayo, including the county's largest towns, Castlebar, Ballina (via the N26), and Westport.

Almost all of the route has been improved in the 21st century, with the construction of bypasses and extensive resurfacing works on stretches not yet bypassed. From Longford, the N5 passes through Strokestown and close to Ballaghaderreen, before crossing the N17 at an interchange near Ireland West Airport and continuing westward to bypass Swinford and Castlebar before terminating in Westport. The N26 to Ballina leaves the N5 just outside Swinford. The road is 132 kilometres (82 mi) long.

== Standard of route ==
The majority of the N5 is a two-lane single carriageway, however a 20km section from Westport to the Castlebar East roundabout is a four-lane dual carriageway without hard shoulders. The single carriageway section has wide driving lanes and hard shoulders for 60 km (37 mi) between Castlebar East and Leggatinty, near Bellanagare, and between Strokestown and Longford for 20 km (12 mi). The remainder of the route – between Bellanagare and Strokestown – consists of a narrow road with no hard shoulders, and with a poor horizontal and vertical alignment allowing few overtaking opportunities. Construction work to upgrade this section started in 2023 (see below).

== Campaign to upgrade route ==
The standard of the N5 road is a significant political issue in Mayo. Local politicians have argued that because the N5 is the main access route to the county, it should be upgraded to a consistent standard - a single carriageway road with hard shoulders, bypassing all towns along the route.

Political arguments were given more weight in recent years when several major multinational firms based in Mayo joined forces to lobby the government to upgrade the N5. The Mayo Industries Group is made up of household names including Coca-Cola (through its Mayo subsidiary Ballina Beverages), Allergan Pharmaceuticals, Baxter and Hollister. The group has met with senior government ministers on several occasions in an attempt to secure funding for further improvements to the road.

== Completed schemes ==
=== Westport – Turlough ===
This 25.5 km (15.8 mi) comprises a 20km dual carriageway from Westport to the existing N5 near Turlough, bypassing Castlebar, as well as a single carriageway relief road around Westport and the realignment of 2.5km of the N59 road north of the town. An Bórd Pleanala approved the route in May 2014. Contracts were signed in October 2019 for the construction of the project. The Castlebar bypass opened on 26 April 2023, with the remainder of the route to Westport opening on 15 June that year. The original N5 road has been redesignated as a regional route, the R309.

=== Ballaghaderreen bypass ===
This scheme comprises 13.6 km (8.5 mi) of standard single carriageway and provides a bypass to the north of Ballaghaderreen town. The project includes realignment/bridging of local roads and a major grade separated junction between the N5 and R293 to provide access to the town. An Bord Pleanála approved the scheme in 2008. Transport Minister Leo Varadkar turned the first sod on the project on 2 November 2012, and the road was opened on 2 September 2014 by Taoiseach Enda Kenny.

=== Longford bypass ===
This is a 2.6 km (1.6 mi) standard single carriageway link between the N4 and the existing N5. It provides a bypass to the northwest of Longford town so that traffic between Dublin and Mayo no longer has to pass through Longford town centre. The scheme includes rail and river bridge crossings and access is restricted to the roundabouts at either end of the scheme. Construction commenced in April 2011 and the road opened to traffic on 3 August 2012.

=== Charlestown bypass ===
An 18 km (11 mi) long single carriageway bypass of Charlestown, from east of Carracastle to the end of the Swinford bypass at Cloonlara, began construction in March 2006 and opened on 2 November 2007. It cost €81 million to build.

It is named the John Healy Road in honour of the late Irish Times journalist who wrote about the economic decline of Charlestown in the 1960s.

=== Scramoge – Cloonmore ===
An 8 km (5 mi) stretch of standard single carriageway between Strokestown and Longford commenced construction in September 2001 and was officially opened on 10 May 2004 at a cost of €21 million. The project includes two river bridges, one rail bridge, 500 metres of culverts and 600,000 cubic metres of earthworks - including excavation of 350,000 cubic metres of peat.

=== Swinford bypass ===
A 5 km (3.1 mi) single carriageway bypass of Swinford was completed in August 1994 at a total cost of IR£9.1M. It incorporates a major junction with the N26 road to Ballina. The junctions on this scheme are all at-grade and this has led to safety concerns, with high collision rates at the R320, R375 and N26 junctions. Average speed cameras were installed at both ends of the bypass in 2024. There is a proposal to grade separate the busiest junctions by providing overbridges for crossing traffic.

=== Castlebar – Turlough ===
This 7.8 km (4.8 mi) single carriageway includes a bypass of Turlough village and was opened to traffic on 12 November 1990 by Environment Minister Padraig Flynn. The total cost was IR£5.1M. The western end of this scheme was itself bypassed and redesignated as the R309 after the 2023 opening of the Turlough to Westport dual-carriageway.

== Schemes in planning or construction ==
=== Scramoge – Ballaghaderreen ===
The project involves the upgrade of the N5 in County Roscommon between Rathkeery at the eastern end of the Ballaghaderreen bypass and Scramoge, east of Strokestown. It will bypass Frenchpark, Bellanagare, Tulsk and Strokestown. The planned route, a 33 km (21 mi) stretch of single carriageway, was approved by An Bord Pleanala in January 2019. Contracts for the construction of the project were signed in October 2021, with Roadbridge awarded the contract. However, Roadbridge collapsed in March 2022. The project was re-tendered and construction was due to start in late 2023. Contracts were signed with Wills Bros, the new contractor, on 8 December 2023. The first section of the new road, a bypass of Frenchpark, opened on 26 March 2026.

=== Turlough – Bohola ===
The Turlough to Bohola road scheme will facilitate the upgrade of the N5 from east of Castlebar to east of Bohola. The project will combine an online upgrade of the existing N5 west of Bellavary with offline bypasses of both Bellavary and Bohola. A preferred route corridor has been selected.

== Route through Longford and Roscommon ==
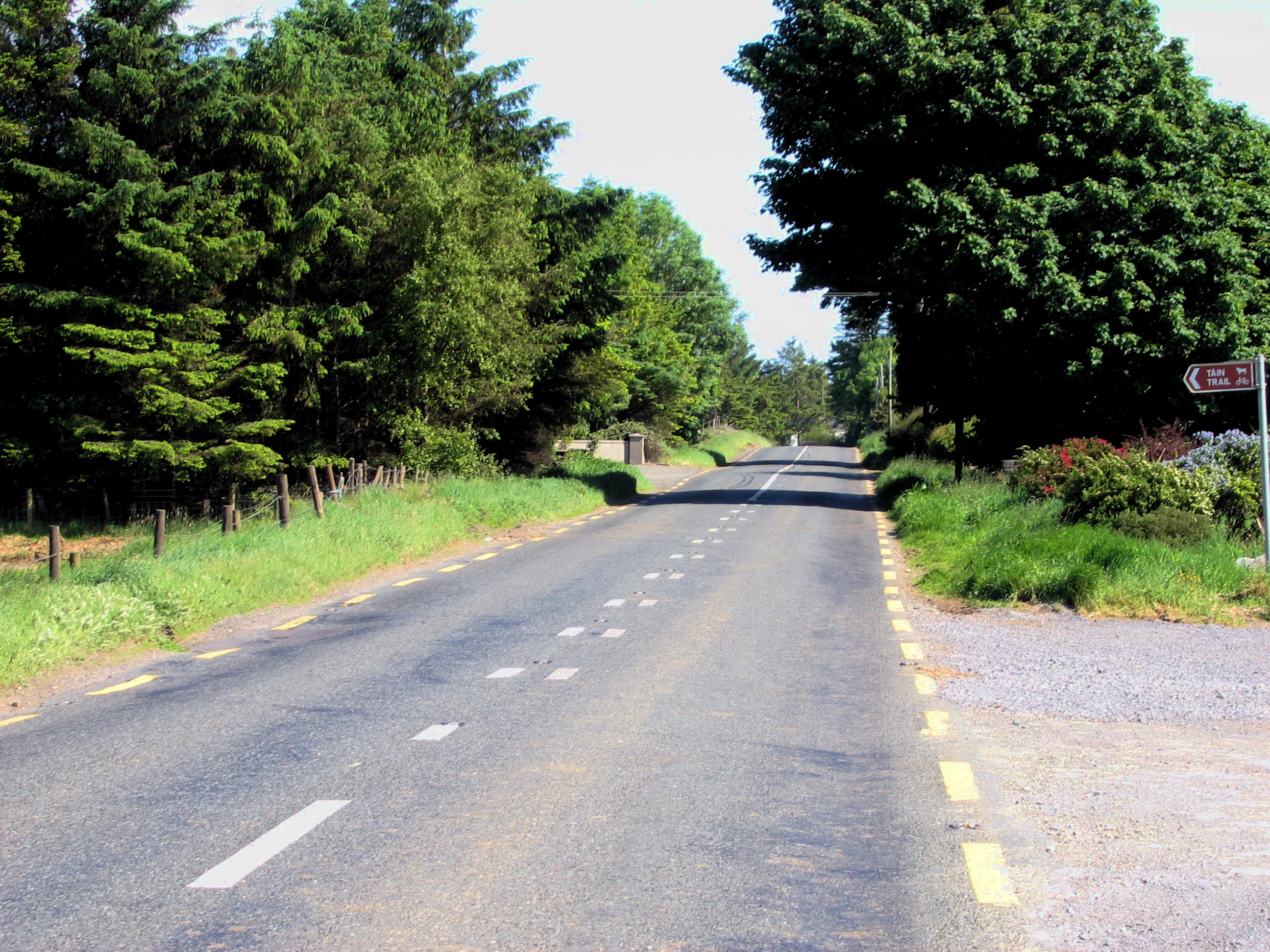
The N5 near Tulsk, County Roscommon in 2006, before upgrade works

The N5 leaves the N4 on the northwest side of Longford. The first 3 km (1.9 mi) of the route follows a new bypass road that was completed in August 2012. Approximately 8 km (5.0 mi) west of the town, the N5 crosses the River Shannon into County Roscommon at Tarmonbarry Bridge. The road passes by Scramoge along a realignment (opened in May 2004) on the way to Strokestown. West of Strokestown, at Tulsk, the N61 crosses the N5. The route continues northwest and passes north of Ballaghaderreen (alignment opened in 2014) before crossing into County Mayo.

== Route through Mayo ==
The N5 continues west bypassing Carracastle and Charlestown (bypass opened 2007). The N17 crosses the route near Charlestown. The N26 joins the N5 at Cloonlara just east of Swinford (bypassed to the south by the N5 Swinford Bypass). The N5 runs west/southwest through Bohola to Bellavary, where it meets the N58. The N5 continues west towards Castlebar, where it bypasses the town on the southeastern side as a dual carriageway, with grade-separated junctions for the N60 (for Roscommon town via Claremorris and Ballyhaunis) and N84 (for Galway via Ballinrobe and Headford) roads. The dual carriageway ends at a roundabout on the outskirts of Westport, while the N5 continues as a single carriageway, bypassing Westport to the north, before terminating at a roundabout junction with the N59. The N5 is County Mayo's busiest road with traffic counts of almost 10,000 vehicles per day between Westport and Bellavary. Conversely, some parts of the route through County Roscommon have less than 5,000 vehicles daily

== See also ==
- Roads in Ireland
- Motorways in Ireland
- National secondary road
- Regional road
