= Carracastle =

Roman Catholic parish in Ireland

Coordinates: 53°57′N 8°42′W

Carracastle (Irish: Ceathrú an Chaisil, meaning 'quarter of the fort') is a small, rural Roman Catholic parish in Counties Mayo, Roscommon and bordering County Sligo in Ireland. It contains part of the civil parish is Kilbeagh, which also contains Charlestown Catholic parish. It is roughly halfway between the Mayo town of Charlestown and the Roscommon town of Ballaghaderreen. The parish is made up of the main parish of Carracastle and the half parish of Rooskey. There is a Catholic church in each parish and a school in Carracastle (a school in Rooskey closed down in June 2009).

== History ==
There are over twenty ring forts in Carracastle. The original church in Carracastle, on the site of the present church, was a small thatched building which also served as a school house. The church in Carracastle today was built in 1877 and it was officially opened and blessed on 21 October 1877. The altar of Caen stone and marble was consecrated by Bishop McCormack on 9 June 1884. Church records for Carracastle parish begin in about 1850.
