= Nephin =

Mountain in County Mayo, Ireland

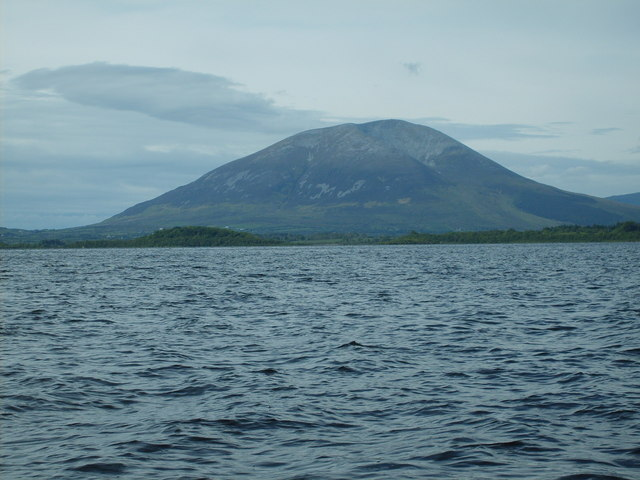
- Nephin from Lough Conn, several miles away

Highest point
- Elevation: 806 m (2,644 ft)
- Prominence: 778 m (2,552 ft)
- Listing: Vandeleur-Lynam
- Coordinates: 54.012°N 9.368°W

Naming
- Native name: Néifinn

Geography
- Location within island of Ireland
- Location: County Mayo, Ireland
- OSI/OSNI grid: G103079

Nephin (NAY-FINN) (Irish: Néifinn), at 806 metres (2,644 ft), is the highest standalone mountain in Ireland and the second-highest peak in Connacht (after Mweelrea). It is to the west of Lough Conn in County Mayo.

== Location ==
It lies in the centre of Glen Nephin (Gleann Néifinne), a district bounded by Lough Conn to the east, the Windy Gap/Barnageehy to the south, and Birreencorragh mountain to the west.

== History ==
Nephin is mentioned in Cath Maige Tuired ("The Battle of Moytura") as one of the "twelve chief mountains" of Ireland. In the text it is called Nemthenn. This name may be related to nemeton, a term for a sacred space in Celtic polytheism.

The mountain's importance may be inferred by the decision at the Synod of Ráth Breasail in 1111 to make Nephin the northern boundary of the diocese of Cong. Gleann Neimhthinne is stated by John O'Donovan as being one of the seven constituent parts of Tirawley.

Glen Nephin remained an Irish-speaking area into the second half of the 19th century.

Nephin was included in the 2020 movie Wild Mountain Thyme.

== See also ==
- Lists of mountains in Ireland
- List of Irish counties by highest point
- List of P600 mountains in the British Isles
- List of Marilyns in the British Isles
- List of Hewitt mountains in England, Wales and Ireland
