= Swinford =

Town in County Mayo, Ireland

Swinford Béal Átha na Muice (Irish)
- Town
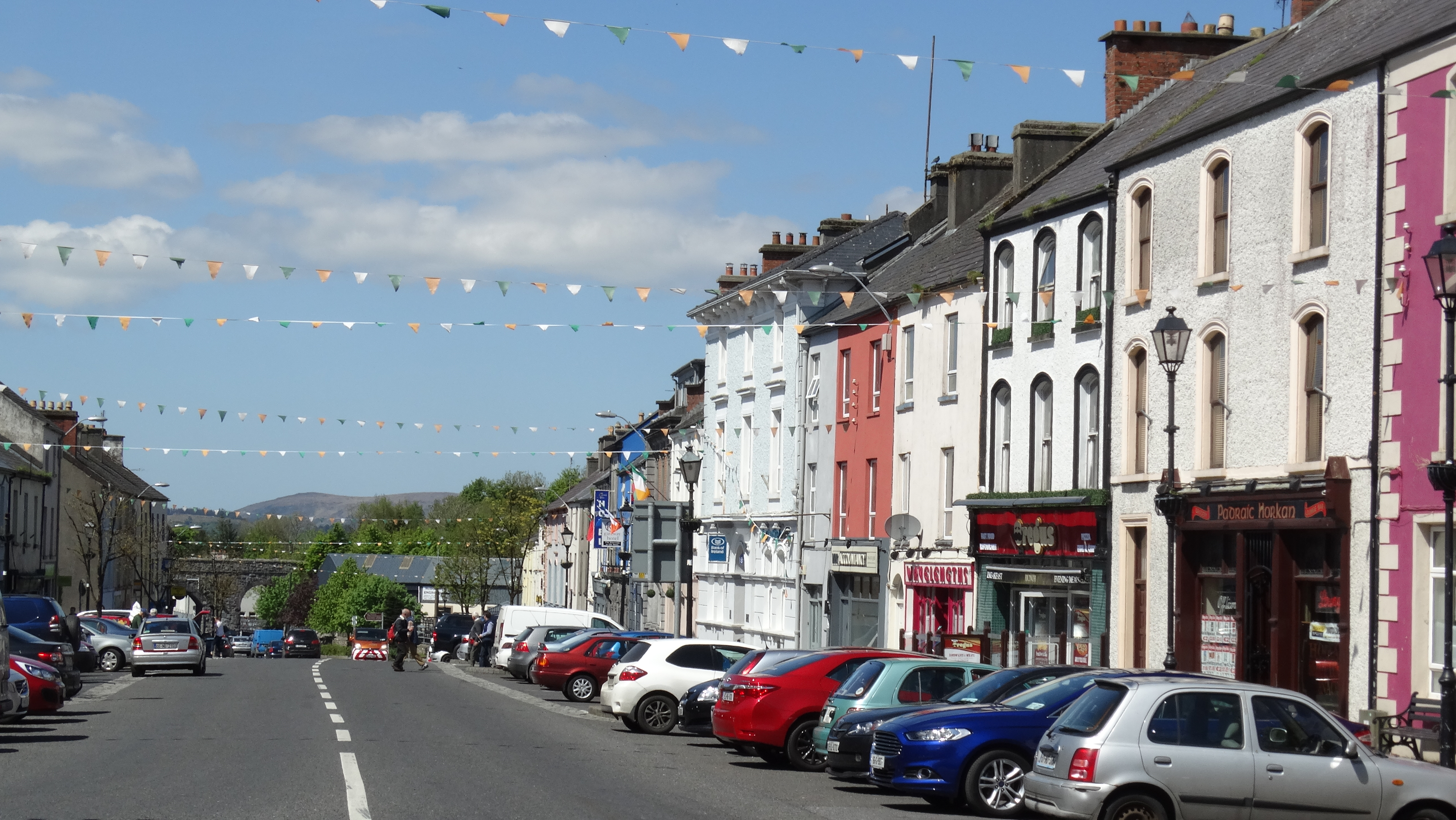
- Swinford's main street in 2016

- Location in Ireland
- Coordinates: 53°56′30″N 8°57′00″W
- Country: Ireland
- Province: Connacht
- County: County Mayo
- Elevation: 65 m (213 ft)

Population (2016)
  - Total: 1,394
- Irish Grid Reference: M376997

Swinford (Irish: Béal Átha na Muice, meaning 'ford-mouth of the pig') is a town in County Mayo, Ireland. It is surrounded by a number of smaller villages, including Midfield and Meelick. It is just off the N5 road, 18 km (11 mi) from Ireland West Airport. Situated on a tributary of the River Moy, Swinford is known for its fishing waters, including the Callow lakes and the lakes of Conn and Cullin. Swinford was bypassed in 1993 by the N5 route and was the first town in Mayo to be bypassed.

== Etymology ==
The origins of the name "Swinford" are disputed. Two primary theories exist; the first suggests that the original name of the town was "Swineford", derived from a pig market held regularly in the town. The official Irish language name for the town is "Béal Átha na Muice", which is "mouth of the ford of the pigs" in English. The second theory as to the origin of the Swinford name is that it has always been named Swinford, and that the name Swinford is derived from Swinford, Leicestershire. The Brabazon family, who founded the town, originally came to Ireland from Leicestershire in the 1700s.

== History ==
=== Origins and early history ===
Swinford was created as a planned town by the Anglo-Irish Brabazon family in the late 1700s. The Brabazons had originally resided in County Galway, but lost their estates there after fighting on the losing side in the Williamite War in Ireland. Although their Galway estates were confiscated, they were granted new land in County Mayo as a consolation. In 1769, the Brabazons began granting leases; 40 people were given the right to build houses in a pre-planned pattern and layout in the area that would become Swinford. The then landlord, William Brabazon, encouraged good quality structures by donating lumber and slate towards construction, and the result was that many of the initial structures in Swinford were three stories tall.

The Protestant church, which still stands today, was built in 1810, while a courthouse was constructed in 1840.

Following the Poor Relief (Ireland) Act of 1838, a workhouse was built in 1842, and it immediately became a focal point of the town as the Irish Famine began in 1845. In 1847, the death toll around Swinford was so severe that 564 corpses had to be buried in a mass grave behind the workhouse.

In 1855, the Sisters of Mercy established a presence in the town, building a convent near the parish church. They took over operation at the workhouse during the 1880s. In 1906, they established a primary school and a secondary school for girls in the town. In 1916, the Sisters of Mercy took over the Brabazon estate house and converted it into a domestic economy school.

During the 1890s, a bridge was constructed in Swinford between Main Street and the Ballina Road to allow the entry of a railway through the town as well as the establishment of Swinford railway station. It was also during the 1890s that the current Our Lady Help of Christians Catholic church was built.

=== Swinford Revolt ===
John Dillon was a long-serving Member of Parliament for East Mayo at Westminster. His major policy issue was the resolution of the Land Question. Dillon took an uncompromising position in favour of the smallholders (small farmers) who sought to gain ownership of the land which they held as tenants from the largely Anglo-Irish landlords. From the middle of the 19th century, ongoing attempts were made at Westminster by the Liberal Party under William Ewart Gladstone to resolve the issue by passing the Irish Land Acts. Irish opinion, while welcoming of the initiative to resolve the injustice, was divided between the moderates, led by William O'Brien, who favoured a conciliatory approach (known as the doctrine of conciliation) and the hardliners. The hardliners supported an aggressive agrarian struggle and sought to advance simultaneously the struggle for Home Rule.

On 25 August 1903, Dillon, addressing a meeting of his constituents at the Swinford Workhouse, spoke vehemently against the doctrine of conciliation. This divided the Party and led to the departure of William O'Brien. It became known as the "Swinford Revolt". Despite the turmoil, the Chief Secretary for Ireland, George Wyndham's Land Purchase (Ireland) Act 1903 passed at Westminster, resolving the Irish Land Question.

=== War of Independence ===
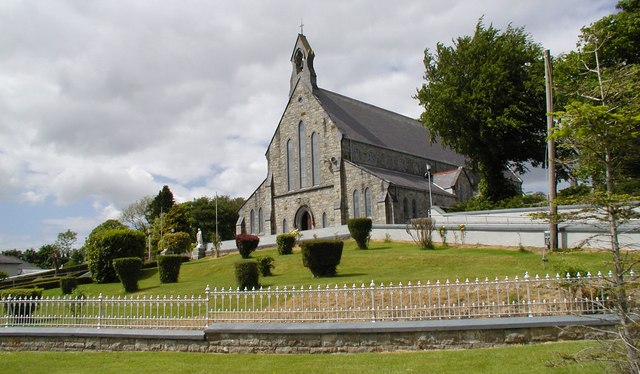
Catholic church in Swinford (built c. 1890)

Swinford, like other areas in the West of Ireland, was the site of a number of actions during the Irish War of Independence (1919–1921). According to one account, nationalists in East Mayo had a long running split dating back to the Parnell scandal, with relations between nationalist factions in Swinford and Meelick particularly poor. The failure to organise in advance of the Easter Rebellion in 1916 paradoxically meant however that relatively few Swinford men were arrested and interned, meaning they were outside the network of republican leaders that developed in the internment camps and prisons. It was not until approx 1920 that the IRA was structured in Swinford, and from then, with the participation of a group of young volunteers, the activity increased, particularly in the sphere of Republican Courts.

According to the Galway Observer of Saturday, 24 July 1920, in an article entitled "Shots in Swinford":

A military patrol of the Border regiment from Claremorris was fired at on Saturday night at Swinford and two soldiers were severely wounded. The soldiers halted at Swinford courthouse, from which four streets branch and immediately shots were fired at them by unknown parties. The lorry was riddled in several places with several bullets.

The military returned the fire, discharging as many as 500 rounds, with what result did not transpire. The wounded soldiers were conveyed to Claremorris, where their wounds were dressed prior to removal to the Curragh Hospital.

On 19 August 1920, IRA members broke into the goods shed at Swinford Railway station and destroyed 10 tons of food and fuel belonging to British security forces. Later that month, on 27 August 1920 IRA volunteers from Swinford and Bohola attacked and captured Ballyvary RIC Barracks, and on 27 November 1920 two Swinford men, James Henry and Thomas Fraher were convicted at a military court in Galway of possessing weapons and intelligence on the RIC. Both were sentenced to periods of imprisonment.

Local folklore has it that other British patrols were ambushed in rural areas outside the town, and that local Volunteers from the (Old) Irish Republican Army climbed onto the roof of the Royal Irish Constabulary barracks (now the site of the Gateway Hotel) and burnt it to the ground by breaking slates and pouring petrol into the building.

During this period British soldiers were also billeted in the town.

== Transport ==
Swinford railway station opened on 1 October 1895, closed for passenger traffic on 17 June 1963, and finally closed altogether on 3 November 1975.

== Culture ==
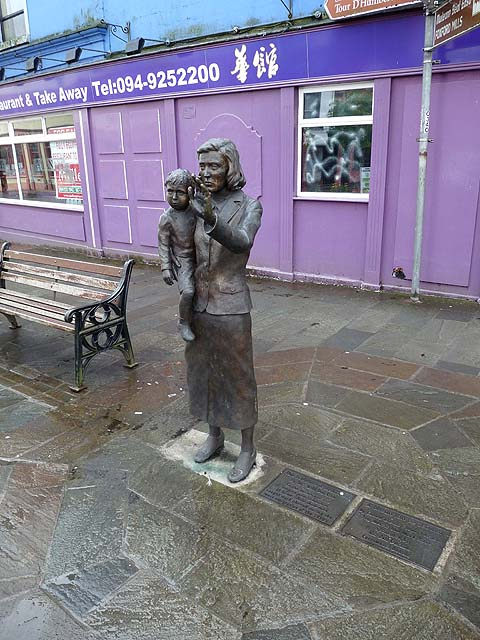
Statue in Swinford focusing on the impact of emigration from the area in the mid-20th century

In 1961, Swinford hosted Fleadh Cheoil na hÉireann.

Swinford has hosted one of County Mayo's largest summer festivals since the mid-1980s. Siamsa Sráide Swinford ('fun in the streets of Swinford'), is a street festival of pageantry, céilí dancing and heritage displays which depict the traditions of East Mayo. The five-day festival takes place in the first week of August and features live bands playing open-air concerts as well as a heritage day, history walks and an busking competition.

Between 2008 and 2018, Swinford was used in the filming of the TV show Hardy Bucks as the fictional town of Castletown.

== Sport ==
A Gaelic Athletic Association (GAA) club representing the area, the Swinford Sextons, contested the first ever Mayo final in 1889, losing to Ballina Stephenites GAA. The current GAA club, Swinford GAA, won a Mayo Minor Football title in 1951 and a Mayo Senior Hurling title in 1956.

Association football (soccer) is also played in the area, and it is claimed that the grandmother of the Argentinian footballer Alfredo Di Stéfano was from Tumgesh near Swinford. The local soccer team, Swinford FC, was established in 1970s.

== Education ==
Up to the mid-1980s, the town had 3 second-level schools: St. Patrick's College, St. Mary's Convent, and Swinford Vocational School. The three schools amalgamated in August 1992 to become Scoil Muire agus Pádraig. There is also a national school called Scoil Muire agus Treasa or Swinford National School.

== People ==
- Thomas Martin Aloysius Burke, bishop of Albany (New York)
- Pádraig Carney (1928–2019), Mayo inter-county Gaelic footballer
- Mary Davis, disability rights activist
- Bernard Durkan, TD for Kildare North constituency
- John Feeney (1903–1967), Irish tenor, buried at Swinford
- Joe Lydon, boxer and footballer
- Enda Marren, former member of the Council of State and of the Law Reform Commission
- Ulick McEvaddy, owner of Omega Air
- Caitríona Ruane, Stormont Minister for Education and South Down MLA
- Chris Tordoff, known as Francis 'The Viper' Higgins. Actor, Comedian and YouTube personality
- Michaela Walsh, shotputter and hammer thrower

== See also ==
- List of towns and villages in Ireland
