= River Moy =

River in Counties Sligo and Mayo, Ireland

Coordinates: 54°11′N 9°09′W

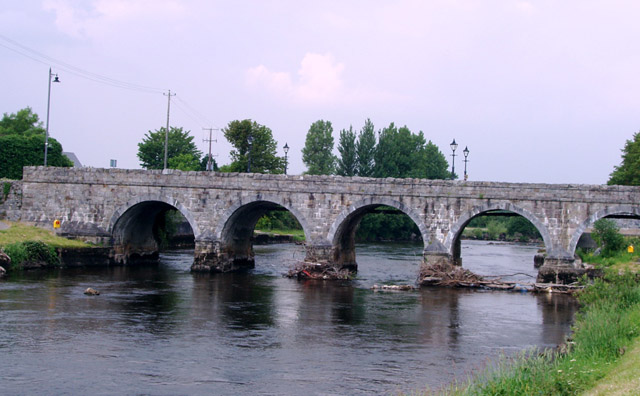
- River Moy at Foxford, County Mayo
- Etymology: Old Irish muad, "noble"
- Native name: An Mhuaidh (Irish)

Location
- Country: Ireland

Physical characteristics
- Source
  - location: Ox Mountains, County Sligo
- Mouth
  - location: Atlantic Ocean via Killala Bay
- Length: 110 km (68 mi)
- Basin size: 2,086 km^{2} (805 sq mi)
- Discharge
  - average: 63 m^{3}/s (2,200 cu ft/s)

Basin features
- Tributaries
  - left: Owengarve River, Gweestion River
  - right: River Inagh

The River Moy (Irish: An Mhuaidh) is a river in the west of Ireland. It is renowned for its salmon fishing.

== Name ==
Ptolemy's Geography (2nd century AD) described a river called Λιβνιου (Libniu, perhaps from *lei- "flow"), which probably referred to the River Moy.

The Moy is first named in Adomnán's Life of Columba (c. 700) as Modam fluvium. Later spellings include Muaide, Muadam, Múed, Múaid; the name An Mhuaidh is used in modern Irish. The name is possibly derived from the Old Irish word muad, meaning "noble."

== Geography ==
The Moy rises at the foot of the Ox Mountains in County Sligo. It flows for 110 kilometres (68 mi). For the greater part of its length, it flows southwestward, entering County Mayo and passing near Swinford before passing through Foxford then turning north near the village of Kilmore and heading for the town of Ballina, where it enters the Atlantic Ocean at Killala Bay. The Moy Estuary is eight kilometres (5 miles) long beginning at Ballina and running into Killala Bay. The catchment area of the River Moy is 2,086 km^{2}. The long term average flow rate of the River Moy into Killala Bay is 61.5 cubic metres per second (m^{3}/s)

The Moy valley, with its ancient churches and abbeys, is a prominent tourist destination.

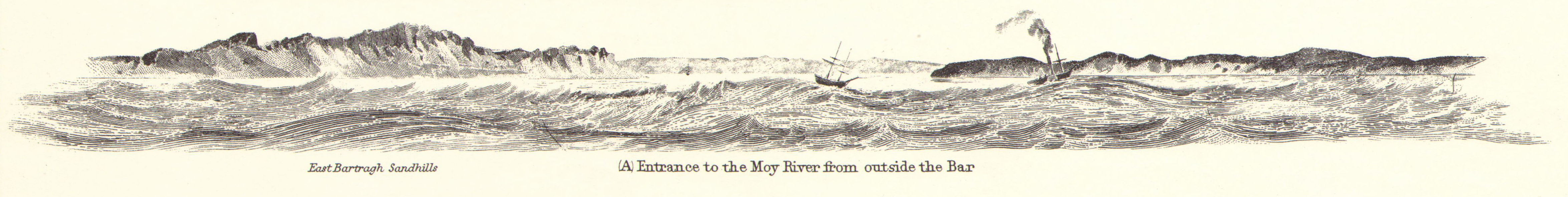

The entrance to the River Moy from an 1860 chart, showing turbulent water over the bar.

== Economics ==
The river was once among the best salmon fisheries in Europe; however, in recent times, drift net fishing off the coast caused a huge decline in salmon numbers. According to central fisheries board statistics, 101,231 returning salmon were taken by drift nets off the west coast of Ireland in 2005. In the same year, 29% (6,675) of all rod-caught salmon in Ireland were taken in the Ballina district as a result of a weir which keeps salmon trapped in the ridge pool near the mouth of the river during the summer. Drift netting for salmon was banned in November 2006 and the ban came into force on 1 January 2007.
