= Bridget Trench =

Bridget Trench (Irish: Bríd Ní Thrinsigh, c. 1804 – 1886) was an Irish religious visionary at Knock, County Mayo. She was the oldest person who witnessed the Marian apparition.

== Life ==
Trench was born in 1804.

She was one of a group who claimed to see apparitions of the Blessed Virgin Mary, Saint Joseph, Saint John the Evangelist, angels, and Jesus Christ (the Lamb of God) at Knock on the evening of 21 August 1879. The event is commemorated at Knock Shrine, a Roman Catholic pilgrimage site and national shrine in the village.

Trench was the eldest of the visionaries, aged 75. When the group gave testimony about what they had seen to the ecclesiastical Commission established by the Archbishop of Tuam, Most Rev. Dr. John MacHale, Trench was the only person to give testimony in Irish, as she could not speak English. She said that she "went in immediately to kiss, as I thought, the feet of the Blessed Virgin; but I felt nothing in the embrace but the wall, and I wondered why I could not feel with my hands the figures which I had so plainly and so distinctly seen".

A sceptical priest alleged that Trench depended on the charity of neighbours.

She died in 1886.
