= R300 (disambiguation) =

The R300 is a graphics chip.

R300 may also refer to:

- R300 (South Africa), a highway near Cape Town
- R300 road (Ireland)
- R-300, a version of the Scud missile
