= R330 road =

R330 road may refer to:

- R330 road (Ireland)
- R330 road (South Africa)
