= Lady of Knock =

Irish Catholic hymn

"Lady of Knock" (Irish: Banthiarna Cnoic) is a Marian hymn to Our Lady of Knock, written by Irish singer Dana Rosemary Scallon. The hymn is popular with some Irish Catholics, especially at funeral services. The song tells of the story of Knock in County Mayo, Ireland, where there was an apparition of the Virgin Mary, Saint Joseph, and Saint John the Evangelist at the south gable of Knock Parish Church in 1879.

== Versions ==
- 1981 - Dana released it as a single
- 1995 - Frank Patterson
- 2003 - Daniel O'Donnell released it on Songs of Faith
- 2010 - Susan Boyle performed it onstage with Daniel O'Donnell at his concert in Castlebar, Ireland
- 2018 - Dana Rosemary Scallon sang it on St Patrick’s Day in St Patrick’s Cathedral, NYC
- 2022 - An Italian student records the first full rendition of the song in Italian,
