= R300 road =

R300 road may refer to:

- R300 road (Ireland)
- R300 road (South Africa)
