= James Horan =

James Horan may refer to:

- James Horan (actor) (born 1954), American character actor
- James Horan (cricketer) (1880–1945), Australian cricketer
- James Horan (Gaelic footballer) (born 1972), two-time and current Mayo manager
- James Horan (monsignor) (1911–1986), parish priest of Knock, Ireland
