= Templemore apparitions =

Alleged visions of the Virgin Mary in Ireland

In August and September 1920 the town of Templemore in County Tipperary, Ireland was the site of alleged Marian apparitions. Thousands of people came to the town daily to see the apparitions. The affair occurred during the Irish War of Independence and resulted in a short-lived local truce between the IRA and Crown forces. When the truce ended, pilgrims stopped coming to the town and the sightings ended. The affair is sometimes referred to as the Templemore miracles.

== Apparitions ==
In January 1919 the Irish War of Independence began. It would last until July 1921. On the night of 16 August 1920, British soldiers of the Northamptonshire Regiment attacked Templemore in reprisal for the killing of an RIC officer by IRA volunteers earlier that day. They fired volleys and burned homes and businesses. No civilians or IRA men were killed but two soldiers died by accident in the fires.

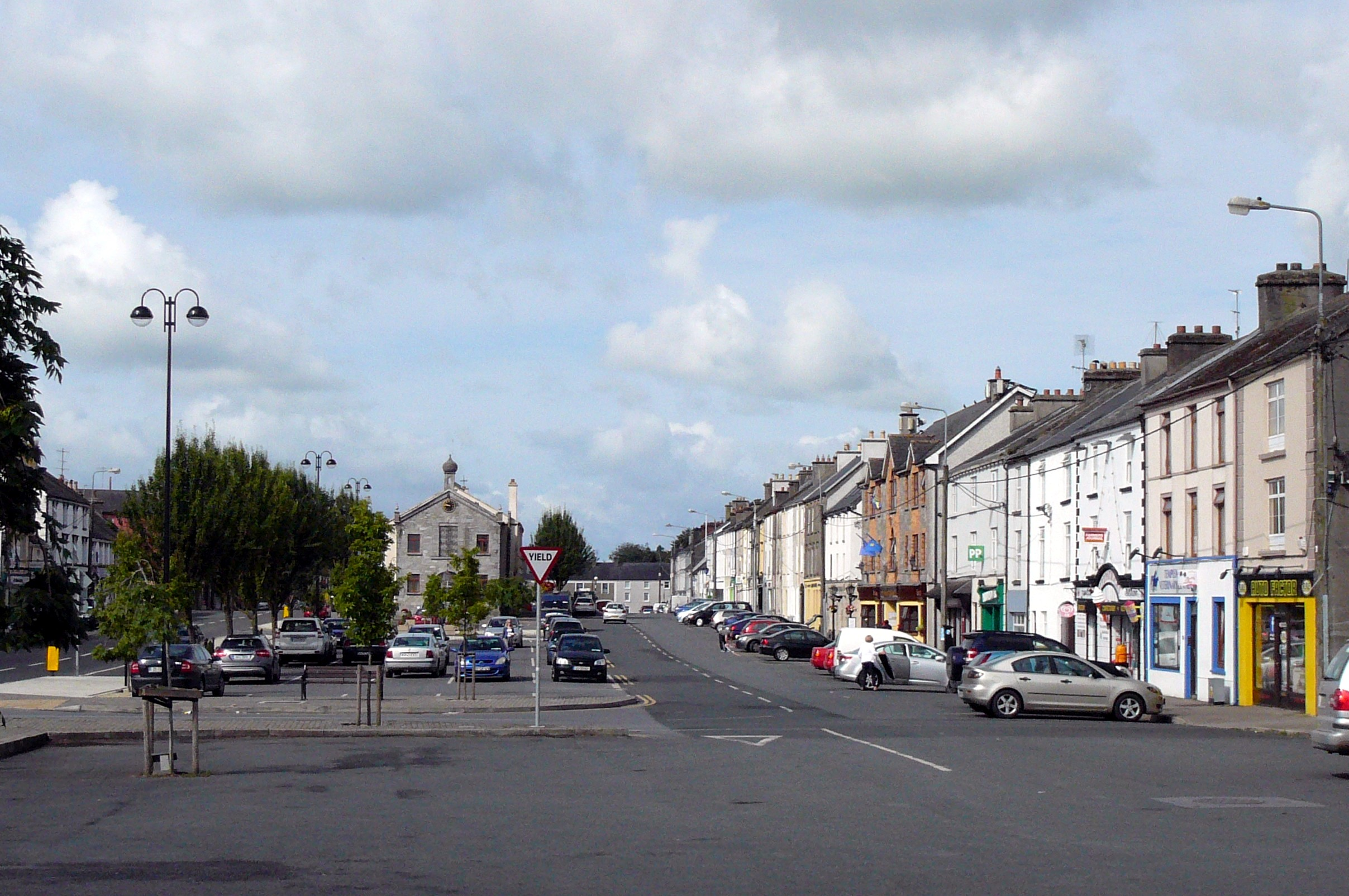
Main Street including Town Hall in 2015

Shortly after the attack, a sixteen-year old farm labourer named James Walsh claimed that he was visited by the Virgin Mary in his cottage in the nearby townland of Curraheen. She told him that she was troubled by what was happening in Ireland. At her request he dug a hole in the ground in his bedroom and this soon filled with spring water. Afterwards he claimed that all three statues of the Virgin Mary in his home began to bleed. He took these statues to Templemore, where the bleeding was witnessed. One man who had been crippled for most of his life claimed he was dancing in the streets after visiting Walsh's cottage. He was the first of many who claimed to have been cured of their ailments in the presence of Walsh or the statues.

Locals believed that divine intervention had prevented any of them being killed or wounded during the attack by the British. Walsh gathered people around the statues to say the rosary in Irish. According to Ann Wilson, the statues were seen ‘as asserting the Catholic Irish identity of the population in the face of the non-Catholic British opponent, a superior spiritual power which would win out against the much more substantial, but merely worldly, advantages of the enemy.’

The affair was soon reported in local and national newspapers, which caused more pilgrims to go to Tipperary, both to see the statues in Templemore and Walsh's cottage in Curraheen. On 31 August 1920 an RIC inspector wrote to the Dublin Castle administration, estimating that over 15,000 pilgrims per day were coming down. Papers dubbed Templemore as ‘Pilgrimville’ or ‘Pilgrimtown’. Many came seeking cures for various illnesses and reported that they had received them. One RIC officer resigned from his job to join a religious order. One soldier is reported to converted to Catholicism. The influx resulted in a large economic windfall for the town.

The official position of the church was one of ‘extreme reserve’. The parish priest Reverend Kiely refused to see the statues. However, no effort was made to stop people making pilgrimages. Rev. Kiely commented ‘If it is a prank, it will fizzle out, if not, why should I stop it?’ Local IRA commander James Leahy noted a division between older and younger clergy in the local church, with older clergy generally being skeptical of Walsh while younger clergy were more enthusiastic about his claims.

Prior to the apparitions beginning, Wilson had given a Virgin Mary statue to a local RIC constable named Thomas Winsey, according to the Tipperary Star. Winsey placed the statue in the barracks. This too was said to be bleeding. One day a large crowd of pilgrims besieged the barracks and had to be physically restrained when they attempted to enter it. The statue was removed from the barracks. Police and military stopped appearing on the street shortly after.

== End ==
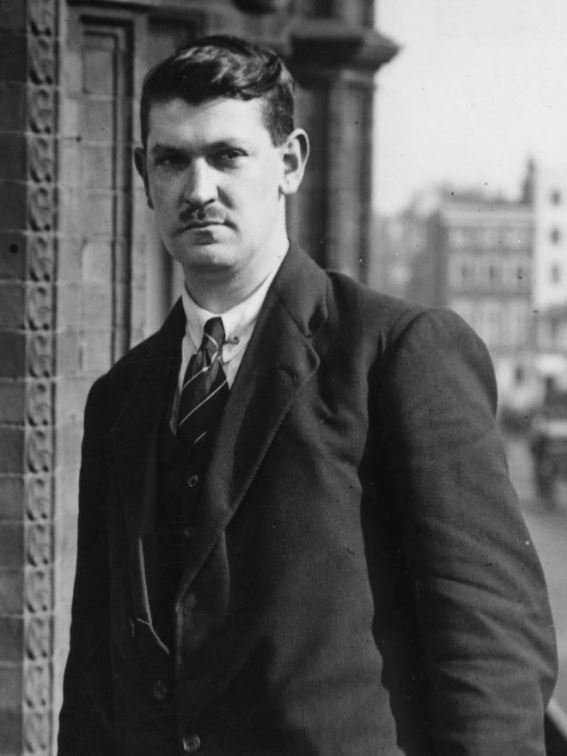
Michael Collins in 1921

The IRA effectively took over the area at this point. They kept order, organised traffic and helped pilgrims. However, they did not appear in the streets in uniform and there was an informal truce in effect between them and Crown forces. The local IRA commander James Leahy imposed a levy on traffic over the objections of the local Sinn Féin TD. Donations were also raised from the pilgrims. The levy and donations had the effect of gaining a considerable amount for the IRA's war effort.

However, Leahy was concerned at the effect that tips given to IRA volunteers were having on discipline. Himself and other local commanders interrogated Walsh and stopped believing him after this. He contacted IRA Director of Intelligence Michael Collins. Collins had Dan Breen interrogate Walsh. Breen reported that Walsh ‘was a fake’. Collins sarcastically replied, ‘One can’t take any notice of what you say, Breen, because you have no religion’.

Having failed to get the church to intervene and denounce Walsh, Leahy and other IRA members decided to restart the war anyway. On 29 September, IRA volunteers attacked a group of RIC men between Templemore and Curraheen. Two constables were killed. As anticipated, this brought police and army reinforcements to the area. Soldiers looted and desecrated sites outside Templemore associated with the pilgrimage. Rumours began that the town itself would soon be attacked. Pilgrims fled the area. The statues apparently stopped bleeding.

Interest in the statues and Walsh's cottage largely ended at this point, ending Templemore as a site for pilgrimages. However, Michael Collins did receive a statue at his request. Upon receiving the statue, he smashed it. He discovered that inside was an alarm clock connected to fountain pen inserts containing sheep's blood. When the clock struck a certain time, it would send a spurt of blood out of the statue, giving the impression it was bleeding. It is not clear that this statue performed in Templemore or was one of the ones owned by James Walsh. Collins had received complaints from a local priest that IRA volunteers had engineered statues that would bleed at intervals.

James Walsh had been labelled as a possible spy by Dan Breen. At the request of Templemore clergy he was taken to Salesian College in County Limerick and placed in the care of Father Aloysius Sutherland. He emigrated to Australia in 1923, settling in Sydney. Towards the end of his life he attempted to enter numerous religious orders but was unsuccessful due to a prior divorce. He died in Sydney in 1977, having never returned to Ireland.

Historian John Reynolds stated at a talk that the affair could have been a prank that got out of hand or was a money-making swindle. He speculated that Walsh may have been used by others, who really instigated it. He discounted the local IRA as having been the instigators.

The affair is not well-known despite gaining worldwide attention at the time. However, in November 2012 the Irish-language television broadcaster TG4 screened a documentary about it. In 2019 the book The Templemore Miracles, written by John Reynolds, was published.

== See also ==
- Knock Shrine - Alleged apparitions in Knock, County Mayo in 1879
- Moving statues - Alleged apparitions in different parts of Ireland in 1985
