= Knock Basilica =

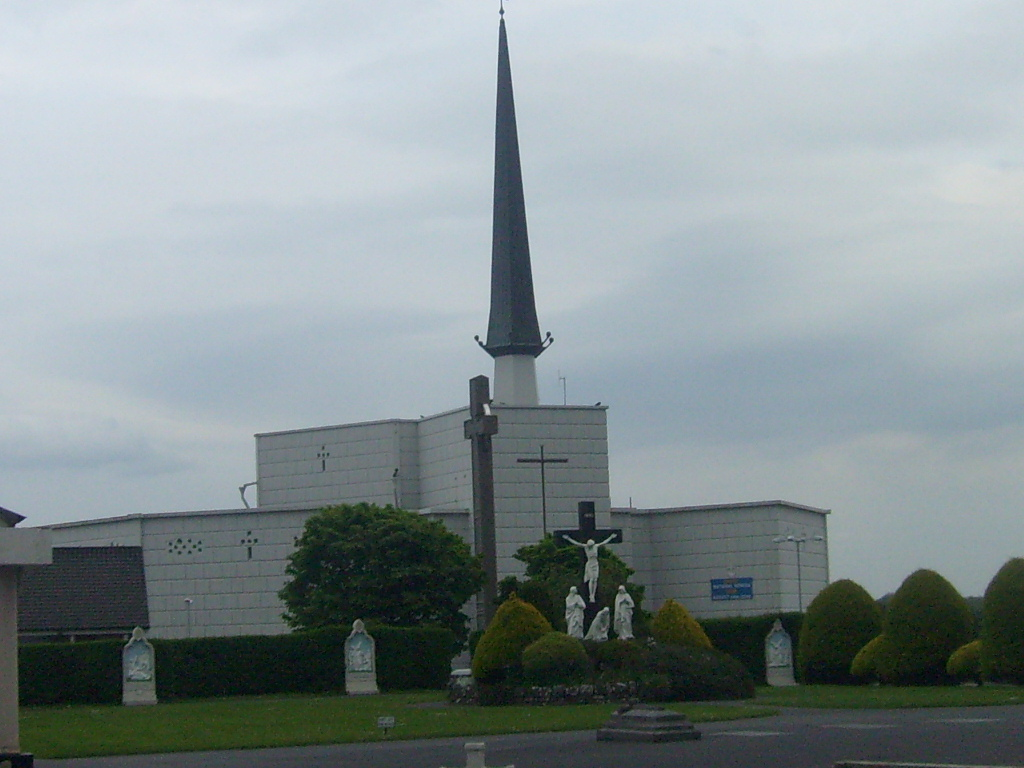
- Knock Basilica

- The Knock Basilica as shown within the map of Ireland
- 53.792121°N 8.917152°W
- Location: Knock, County Mayo
- Country: Ireland
- Denomination: Catholic Church
- Website: link

History
- Status: Minor basilica, International shrine
- Dedication: Virgin Mary

Architecture
- Functional status: Active
- Architect: Daithi Hanly KHS
- Architectural type: Modern

Specifications
- Capacity: 10,000
- Materials: Concrete

Administration
- Archdiocese: Tuam

The Basilica of Our Lady, Queen of Ireland is a Roman Catholic basilica church of the Latin Church located in the small town of Knock, in County Mayo in Ireland. It was designed in modern architecture style with concrete materials by architect Daithi Hanly, and by architects Louis J Brennan and Brian Brennan, and completed in 1976. Its construction was overseen by Monsignor James Horan, who was the parish priest of Knock from 1967 until his death in 1986.

Pope John Paul II raised the shrine to the status of Minor Basilica via his decree Abunde Constat Quam on 17 July 1979.

The basilica, which can accommodate approximately 10,000 people, serves the Roman Catholic Archdiocese of Tuam, and it is part of the Knock Shrine grounds that incorporates four other churches, including the Apparition Church, the place where, according to Catholic beliefs, on Thursday evening of 21 August 1879, the Blessed Virgin Mary, Saint Joseph, and Saint John the Evangelist are proposed to have appeared, the old parish church, the Blessed Sacrament Chapel, and the Chapel of Reconciliation. In this – Ireland's National Marian shrine – there are also a religious books' centre, a caravan and camping park, the Knock House Hotel, and the Knock Museum.
