= Pope John Paul II in popular culture =

As one of the best known and well-travelled people of the 20th century, there are many cultural references to Pope John Paul II (18 May 1920 – 2 April 2005), who was the 264th Pope of the Roman Catholic Church from 16 October 1978 until his death in April 2005. He was the second-longest reigning pontiff, having served for 27 years, short of Pius IX's 31 years. In addition to his own extensive writings, many films, television programs, books, and journal articles have been written about John Paul II.

== Films ==
Films made about John Paul II include:

- Pope John Paul II (1984 film), directed by Herbert Wise, starring Albert Finney, Nigel Hawthorne, Alfred Burke, John McEnery, Patrick Stewart. The film debuted on CBS Television on Easter Sunday, 22 April 1984.
- Pope John Paul's Third Pilgrimage to His Homeland, a documentary on John Paul's June 1987 visit to Poland.
- From a Far Country (1981), directed by Krzysztof Zanussi.
- The Millennial Pope: John Paul II (1999) (TV), a documentary directed by Helen Whitney.
- The Papal Chase (2004), a documentary by Kenny Hotz.

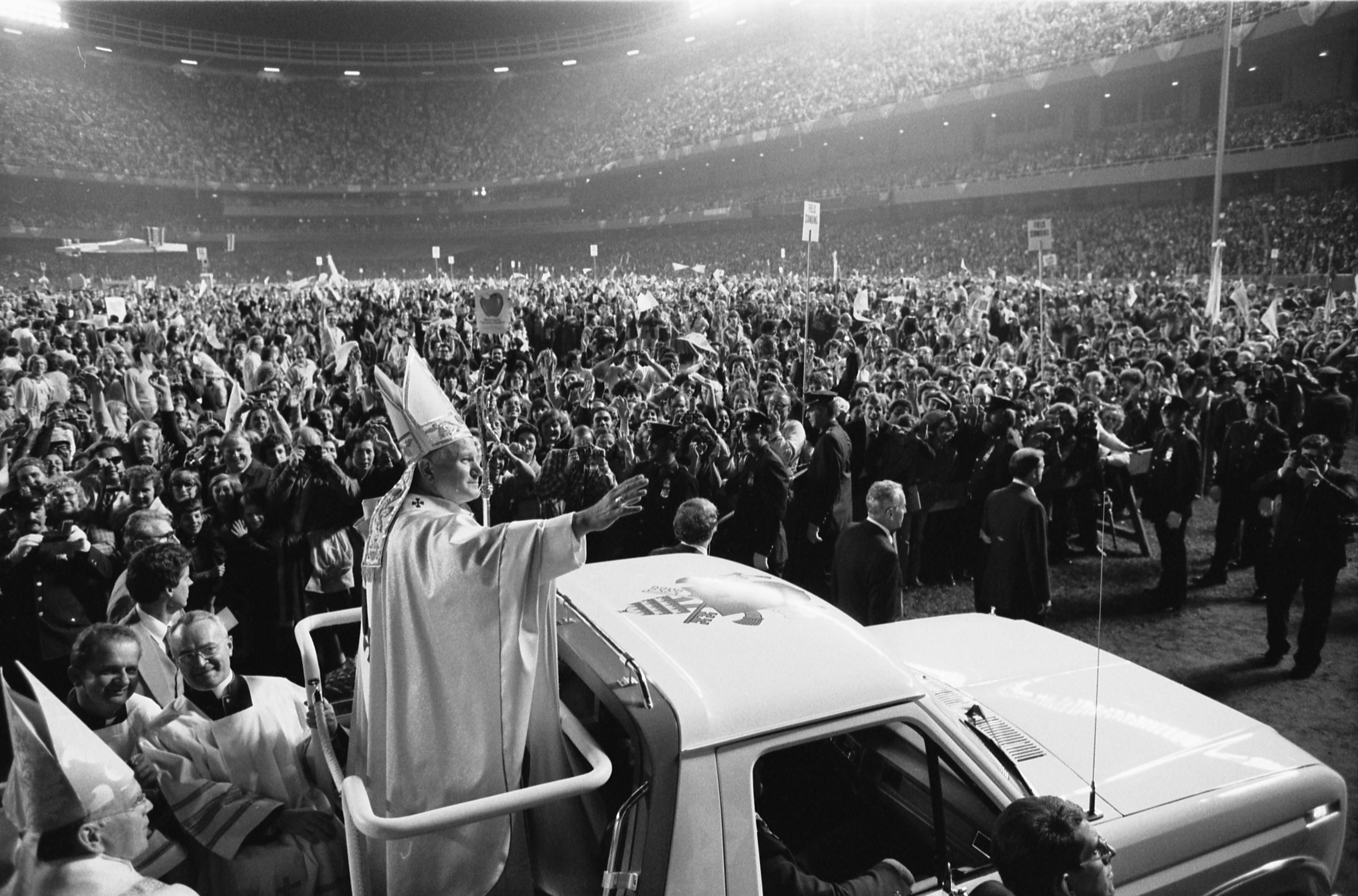
John Paul II at an open-air mass at Yankee Stadium, New York City 1979.

- Karol: A Man Who Became Pope, Polish title: Karol. Czlowiek, który zostal papiezem, 2005, a documentary, directed by Giacomo Battiato, based upon the book Stories of Karol: The Unknown Life of John Paul II by Gian Franco Svidercoschi.
- Have No Fear: The Life of Pope John Paul II (2005), a movie based on the life of Pope John Paul, shot on location in Rome and Lithuania, was broadcast on Thursday, 1 December 2005 (8:00–10:00 pm. ET/PT).
- Pope John Paul II (2005), a four-hour mini-series event based on the remarkable life of Pope John Paul II, shot on location in Kraków, Poland and in Italy, was broadcast Sunday, 4 December (9:00–11:00 pm, ET/PT) and Wednesday, 7 December (8:00–10:00 pm, ET/PT) on the CBS Television Network. Cary Elwes portrays Karol Wojtyla in his adult years prior to being elected Pope on 16 October 1978, and Academy Award winner and multiple Golden Globe Award winner Jon Voight portrays him during his extraordinary 26 1/2-year reign that ended with his death on 2 April 2005. It was approved and blessed by Pope Benedict XVI.
- A Time Remembered – The Visit of Pope John Paul II to Ireland (2005), a film produced by Radio Telefís Éireann, the national broadcaster of Ireland, showing footage from the three-day visit in 1979.
- Karol: The Pope, The Man world debut was on Easter Sunday and Monday of 2006, and is the continuation of Karol: A Man Who Became Pope. It stars the same actors as the first mini-series.
- Credo: John Paul II a 2006 film containing highlights of John Paul II's pontificate, his spiritual heritage, his most significant meetings with heads of states, but also his contact with people from all over the world, from the day of his election to his funeral, with music by Andrea Bocelli.
- The Life of Pope John Paul II, a 4 chapter series by NBC News
- John Paul II – The Friend of All Humanity 60-minute cartoon available on multilingual DVD by Cavin Cooper Productions
- John Paul II, the Pope who made History – 5 DVD by Vatican Television Center (distr. by HDH Communications)
- John Paul II, this is my story – 1 DVD by Vatican Television Center (distr. by HDH Communications)
- John Paul II the Keys of the Kingdom – 1 DVD by Vatican Television Center (distr. by HDH Communications)
- The Pope's Toilet, a 2007 Uruguayan film located in Melo.
- In 1984, Pope John Paul made a cameo appearance on the Malayalam film Minimol Vathicanil. While child actor Shalini's character is visiting Rome, John Paul is seen taking her from the crowd and kissing her. The clip was included in the film.

=== Animation ===
- John Paul II is the only Pope who appears as a main character in an animated feature.

== Books by and about John Paul II ==
- For a list of books written by and about John Paul II, please see Bibliography of Pope John Paul II

=== Literary references ===
- The action-thriller novel, Red Rabbit (2002) by Tom Clancy, detailed a fictional KGB attempt to assassinate a newly elected Polish Pope, who, though only mentioned by the name "Karol", obviously refers to John Paul II.
- Pope John Paul II's visit to Cuba in 1998, the first made by a Pope to this Caribbean island, was featured in Daína Chaviano's novel The Island of Eternal Love (Riverhead, 2008).

=== Comics references ===
- A comic book biography of Pope John Paul II, The Life of Pope John Paul II, was published by Marvel Comics in October 1982. It was written by Steven Grant and illustrated by John Tartaglione. NBM Publishing released a comics biography of the pope in October 2006.
- Belgian cartoonist Zak and writer Bert Verhoye featured Pope John Paul II in a satirical comic album named De Vliegende Paap (1985).
- Belgian comics artist Luk Moerman drew the satirical comic book album De Papevreters – Popebusters (1985), which satirized John Paul II's visit to Belgium that same year.
- French comics artist Guy Lehideux created a biographical comic book about Pope John Paul II.
- French comics artist Jean Lucas featured John Paul II in a cameo in his album Le Secret de la Lune au Temple du Soleil.

== Music ==
- The pope is one of many famous people seen in Killing Joke's 1984 music video to their song "Eightie".
- John Paul II has been featured on at least seven popular albums in his native Poland. Most notably singer-songwriter Stanisław Sojka's 2003 album, "Jan Pawel II – Tryptyk Rzymski", a ten-track collection of the Pope's poems set to music, reached No. 1.

== Television ==
- Like many celebrities of the 1980s and 1990s Pope John Paul II was featured in the satirical puppet TV series Spitting Image. In parody of his frequent world tours he was depicted as a rock 'n' roll star with an American accent.
- In 1987, Pope John Paul made a cameo appearance on the television soap Brookside. While Bobby and Sheila Grant were visiting Rome, John Paul made an appearance at a window for the crowd, clearly being seen in the finished production.
- Pope John Paul II appears in the 2002 South Park episode "Red Hot Catholic Love".

== Video games ==
- Pope John Paul II is one of five world leaders to be featured in the 1989 video game Spitting Image.
- While not mentioned by name, in Jagged Alliance 2 the unnamed pope is said to have caused trouble for the game's villain, the dictator of a Latin American country; an allusion to John Paul II's reputation for conflicts with real-world Latin American dictatorships.

== Miscellaneous references ==
- John Paul II's apostolic motto was Totus Tuus ("totally yours"); and according to his Rosarium Virginis Mariae he borrowed the motto from the Marian consecrating prayer as found in "True Devotion to Mary" by Saint Louis Marie Grignion de Montfort. The complete text of the prayer in Latin is: "Tuus totus ego sum, et omnia mea tua sunt" ("I am all Yours, and all that I have belongs to You"). Furthermore, he singled out Saint Louis de Montfort as a key example of Marian spirituality in his Redemptoris Mater encyclical, and in an address to the Montfortian Fathers said that reading one of de Montfort's books had been a "decisive turning point" in his life.
- A new form of the Stations of the Cross, called the Scriptural Way of the Cross which calls for more meditation, was introduced by Pope John Paul II on Good Friday 1991. He celebrated that thereafter at the Colosseum.
- The Pope was named Time magazine's Person of the Year in 1994.
- According to a New York Post article of 19 February 2002, John Paul II personally performed three exorcisms during his tenure as pope. The first exorcism was performed on a woman in 1982. His second was in September 2000 when he performed the rite on a 19-year-old woman who had become enraged in St Peter's Square. A year later, in September 2001, he performed an exorcism on a 20-year-old woman.
- The John Paul II International Airport (IATA: KRK), in Balice, Poland, near Kraków where he served as Archbishop before being elected Pope, was named in his honor.
- His favorite football team had always been Cracovia, whose games he attended while living in Kraków.
- In 2006 a white hybrid tea rose was named "Pope John Paul II" in his honour, with a percentage of sales going to charity. Ten of the rose bushes were planted in the Vatican gardens.
- John Paul II sent the first papal e-mail in 2001.
- Solar eclipses took place both on the day he was born and the day of his funeral 9:22 pm.
- In 2004, Ferrari made a special F1 car for the pope to celebrate his 26th anniversary as the pontiff.
- In 1988, when the Pope delivered a speech to the European Parliament, the leader of the Democratic Unionist Party, Ian Paisley, shouted "I denounce you as the antichrist!" and held up a poster reading "POPE JOHN PAUL II ANTICHRIST". The Pope continued with his address after Paisley was ejected from the auditorium, primarily by then 77-year-old Otto von Habsburg, former crown prince of Austria-Hungary and a well-known and devout Catholic, with Habsburg snatching Paisley's banner, punching him in the face and, along with other MEPs, pushing him out of the chamber.
- A popular story in chess circles states that a certain Karol Wojtyla had published a chess problem in 1946. Although the young Wojtyla was indeed an accomplished chess player, the story of this publication appears to be a hoax whose roots were uncovered by Tomasz Lissowski.
