= Moving statues =

1985 reported movement of statues in Ireland

Moving statues in Ireland
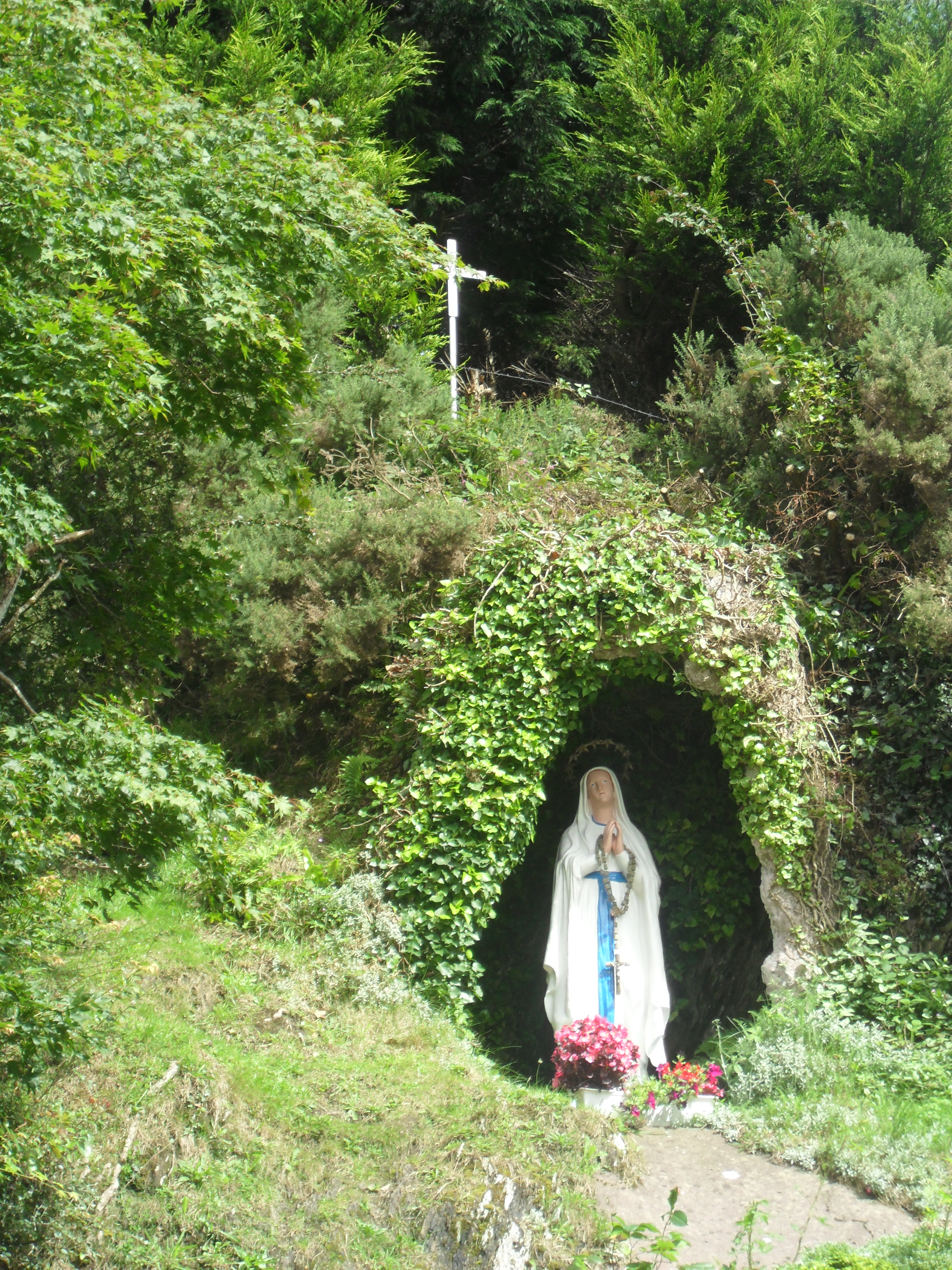
- The Ballinspittle grotto, where one of the first sightings occurred in the summer of 1985
- Native name: Bogadh na nDealbh
- Date: July 22, 1985
- Location: Ballinspittle, County Cork
- Type: Phenomenon

The moving statues (Irish: Bogadh na nDealbh) phenomenon occurred during the summer of 1985 in Ireland, where, in several different parts of the country, statues of the Virgin Mary were reported to move spontaneously.

In Ballinspittle, County Cork, in July 1985, an observer claimed to have seen a roadside statue of the Virgin Mary move spontaneously. Similar occurrences were reported shortly afterward in Mount Melleray, County Waterford, and at around 30 other locations around the country. They were not all Marian apparitions. Some involved other divine figures and/or saints who appeared in stains on church walls etc. Thousands gathered at many of the sites out of curiosity or to gaze in wonder and to pray. Up to 100,000 were said to have visited the Ballinspittle site alone. The Catholic Church remained reticent or highly skeptical and a bishop declared the whole phenomenon 'an illusion'. The Ballinspittle statue was damaged by a gang of hammer-wielding Pentecostal protesters against idolatry (or Mariolatry), led by Robert Draper, who was found guilty of smashing other statues and went on to serve six months in prison, but the Ballinspittle statue was repaired. In 2002 the BBC planned a documentary on the phenomenon.

A team of psychologists based in University College, Cork (UCC), recorded 31 apparition sites and explained the visions as being optical illusions caused by staring at objects in the evening twilight. Others have argued that the moving statues and other extraordinary international phenomenon like the "flying-saucer" religions and many other new religious and occult movements are best explained as responses to an existential angst that was exacerbated by the Cold War and other sources of social stress but with ultimate origins in cultural or religious norms, family dynamics, and personal psychology.

Anthropologist Peter Mulholland argues that the continuing role of Marian apparitions in Irish popular culture is a reflection of psychological insecurity stemming largely from adverse childhood experiences and a concatenation of historical, cultural, political, religious and sociological factors.

Moving statues have also been reported in Poland, another devout Catholic country.

== See also ==
- Roman Catholicism in Ireland
- Knock Shrine
- Templemore apparitions
- Maria Duce
- Weeping Angel, an alien species in Doctor Who that resembles a moving statue.
