= Partry =

Village in County Mayo, Ireland

Partry Partraí
- Village
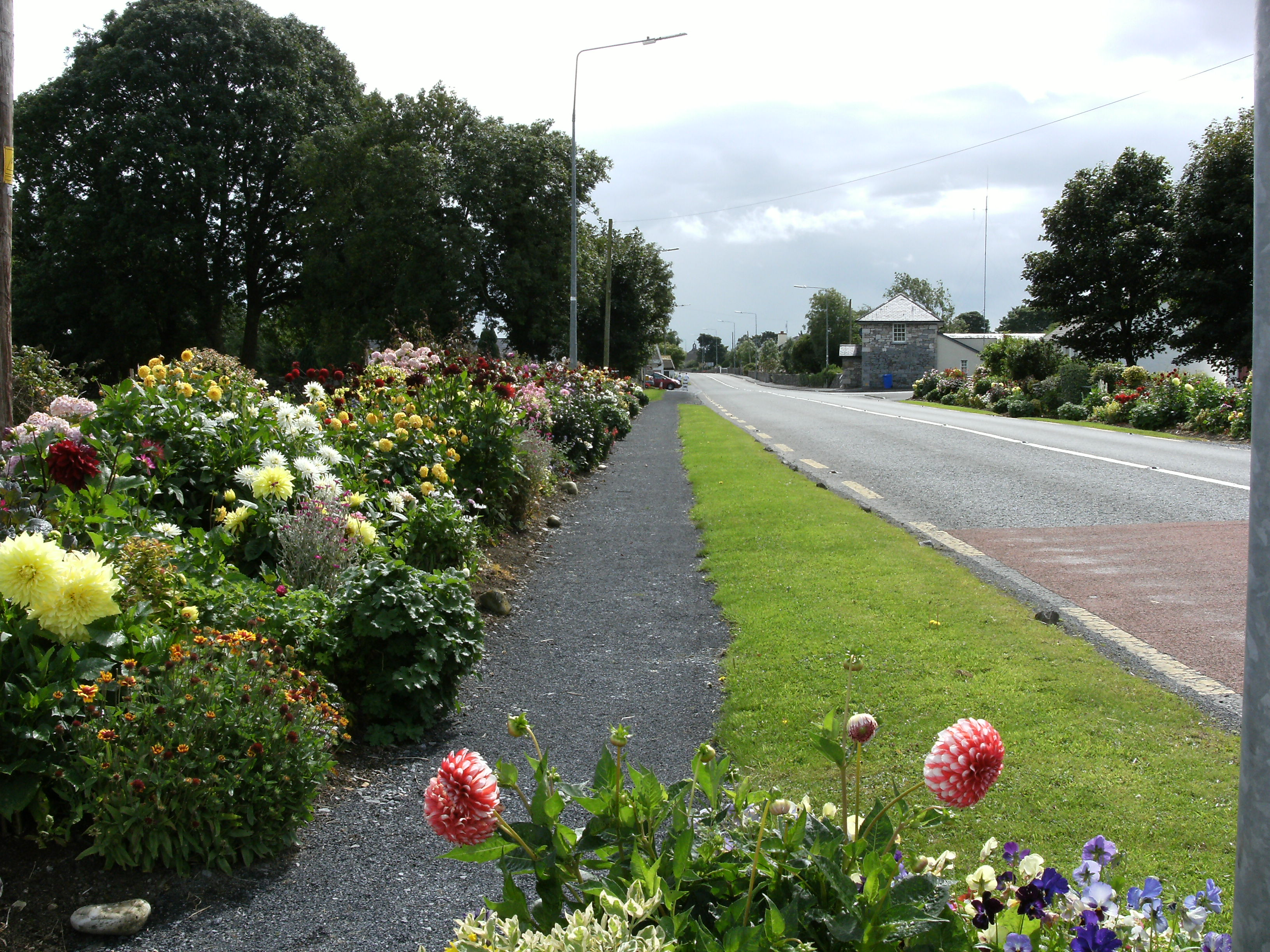

- Location in Ireland
- Coordinates: 53°42′00″N 9°17′00″W
- Country: Ireland
- Province: Connacht
- County: County Mayo
- Elevation: 58 m (190 ft)

Population (2011)
  - Rural: 563
- (Includes entire local electoral division)
- Time zone: UTC+0 (WET)
  - Summer (DST): UTC-1 (IST (WEST))
- Irish Grid Reference: M152730

Partry (Irish: Partraí) is a village and a civil parish formerly called Ballyovey in County Mayo, Ireland. It is located at the junction of the N84 and R330 roads between the towns of Ballinrobe and Castlebar, and between Lough Carra and Lough Mask. The lakes Cloon Lough and Lough Nacorralea are located near Partry.

While formerly known as Ballyovey, the contemporary name, Partry, derives from the word "Partraige", which is the name of the tribe that lived in the area in ancient times.

In 2004, Partry Athletic Football Club was formed by members of the local community. It won Division 2 of the Mayo league the season after its formation.

Partry play with CLG Thuar Mhic Éadaigh for GAA purposes.

A priest hunter named John Mullowney (colloquially known as Seán na Sagart) was reputedly killed in Partry in 1726.

== Notable sites ==
- Partry House, country house and family seat of the Lynch-Blosse baronets

== Notable people ==
- James Horan (1911–1986), born in Partry, parish priest of Knock, known for his successful campaign to establish Ireland West Airport
- Lacky Ó Máille (fl. 18th century), Irish friar and poet.

== See also ==
- List of towns and villages in Ireland
