= Ulick Bourke =

Irish writer, scholar and Catholic priest (1829–1887)

The Very Reverend Ulick J. Bourke Uileog de Búrca
- Born: Ulick Joseph Bourke; 29 December 1829; Castlebar, County Mayo, Ireland
- Died: 22 November 1887 (aged 57); Castlebar, County Mayo, Ireland
- Education: St Jarlath's College; Maynooth College
- Occupations: Scholar, writer, Roman Catholic priest
- Parent(s): Ulick and Cecilia (née Sheridan) Bourke

Ulick Joseph Bourke (English: /ˈjuːlɪk/ YOO-lik; also known by his name in Irish, Uileog de Búrca; 29 December 1829 – 22 November 1887) was an Irish scholar and writer who founded the Gaelic Union, which later developed into the Gaelic League (or Conradh na Gaeilge). Among his works were The College Irish Grammar and Pre-Christian Ireland.

== Biography ==
Ulick Joseph Bourke was born 29 December 1829 in Castlebar, County Mayo, Ireland, the son of Ulick and Cecilia Sheridan Bourke Bourke was educated at Errew Monastery where he studied Irish under Irish scholar and historian, James Hardiman. At age 16 he entered St. Jarlath's College in Tuam, County Galway, in May 1846. He then attended Maynooth College in Maynooth, County Kildare, where he wrote the College Irish Grammar.

=== Ecclesiastical life ===
He was ordained a Catholic priest on 25 March 1858, in Tuam by his mother's first cousin, the Archbishop John MacHale. After leaving Maynooth, he was appointed Professor of Irish, logic, and humanities at St Jarlath's College; where he taught from 1859 to 1878. He was also president of St Jarlath's College, from 1865 to 1878.

Bourke was named as a Canon of the Cathedral of Tuam in 1872. During his stay at St Jarlath's, he acted for some time as private secretary to Archbishop MacHale.

In 1878, Bourke served as parish priest of Kilcolman, Claremorris, Diocese of Tuam. In July 1879 he convened a mass meeting relating to the Land War, a series of civil protests to improve the position of tenant farmers, where Bourke counseled moderation. In 1879, he served on the committee of the Land League.

He was one of the Commissioners appointed to inquire into the alleged Knock apparitions of the Blessed Virgin in 1879.

=== Educational and publishing interests ===
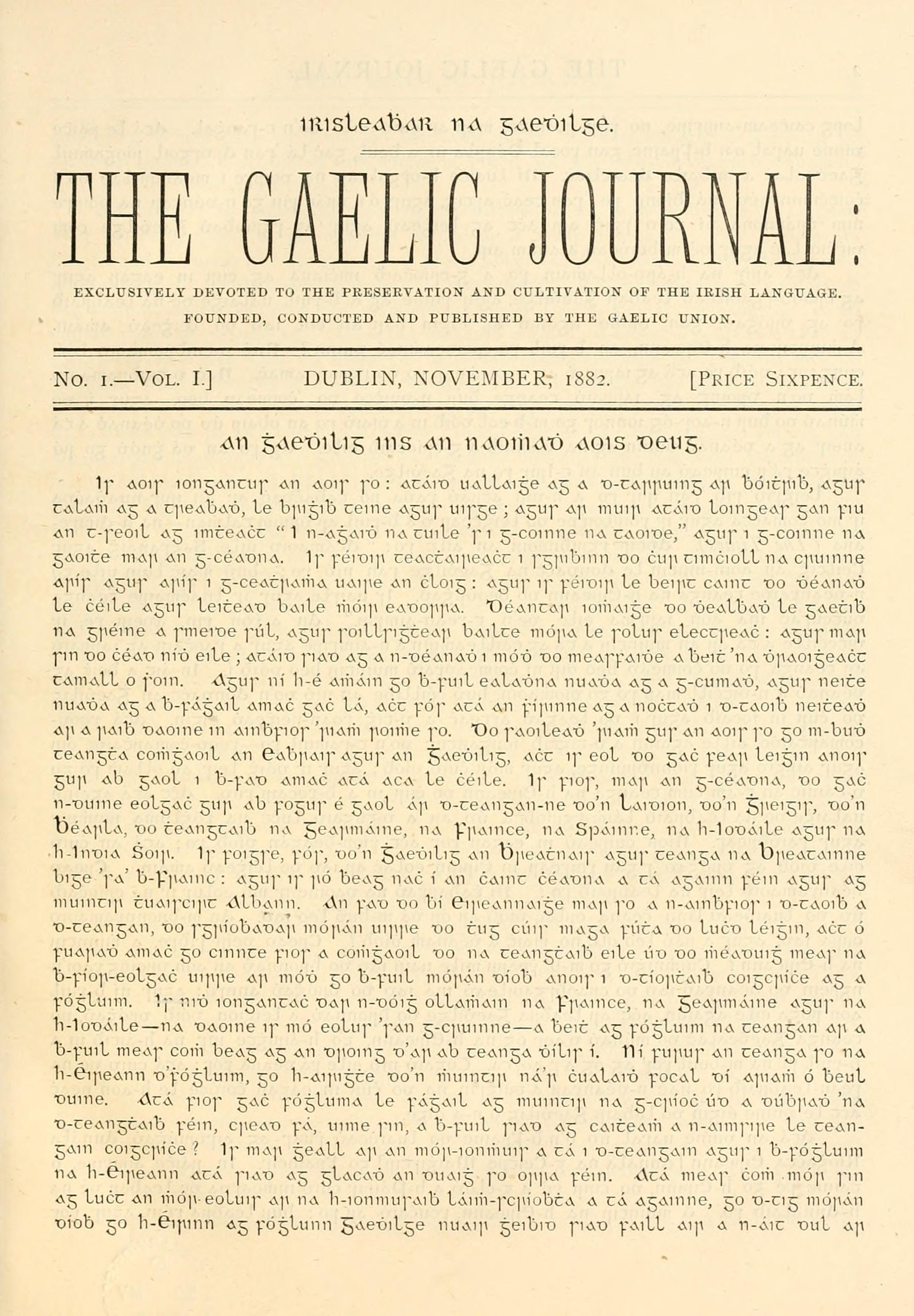
Frontcover Gaelic Journal, 1881

Bourke's educational and publishing interests played an important role in the subsequent Gaelic revival that was taking place in Ireland. He was a member of the Ossianic Society and published Irish columns in several journals including the Tuam News and "successfully publicized" the Irish language issue in the US and Europe.

During 1866, Bourke was elected a member of the Royal Irish Academy. He was a founding member of the Society for the Preservation of the Irish Language (Cumann Buan-Choimeadia Na Gaeilge) in 1876, serving as its first chairman. He later seceded from the society with its original founders, and in March 1880, established the Gaelic Union, along with David Comyn (1854–1907) of the Gaelic Journal.

The Union, a society established for the cultivation and preservation of the Irish Language, later developed into the Gaelic League. The Gaelic Union established the Gaelic Journal which remained in print until and played an important part in the revival.

=== Later years ===
He died in Castlebar on 22 November 1887, aged 57, and was buried on 25 November 1887, at Bearnacarrol (Claremorris) in County Mayo.

=== Memorials ===
A plaque in honour of Uileog de Búrca was erected by Conradh na Gaeilge at the place of his birth on Linnenhall Street in Castlebar, County Mayo. A Gaelscoil, Gaelscoil Uileog de Búrca in Claremorris was also named in his honour in 1981. The late scholar's name is also given to the Claremorris branch of Conradh na Gaeilge.

== Works ==
- The College Irish Grammar (Dublin, 1856)
- Easy Lessons or Self-instruction in Irish (Dublin, 1860) – Appeared first in The Nation.
- The Bull Ineffabilis Deus (Dublin, 1868) – The definition of the Immaculate Conception in four languages; Latin, Irish, French and English.
- Aryan Origin of the Gaelic Race and Language (London, 1875) – A study of Irish Ethnology and the ancient Language of Ireland.
- Memoir of the Bishop and his Times (Dublin, 1877) – A memoir of James O'Gallagher (Roman Catholic Bishop of Kildare).
- The Life and Labours of St. St. Augustin, Bishop of Hippo Regius, with an account of the Canons Regular and of the Augustinian Friars in Ireland (Dublin, 1879)
- The Doctrine of the Immaculate Conception of the Blessed Virgin Mary (Dublin, 1880)
- The Dignity, Sanctity and Intercessory Power of the Blessed Virgin Mary, Mother of God (Dublin, 1881)
- The Life and Times of the Most Rev. Dr. MacHale, Archbishop of Tuam (Dublin, 1882)
- Beatha Sheaghain Mhic Heil, Airdeaspoig Thuama (Dublin, 1882) – Life of John MacHale, Archbishop of Tuam.
- A Plea for the Evicted Tenants of Mayo (Dublin, 1883) – Addressed to William Ewart Gladstone.
- Prechristian Ireland (Dublin, 1887) – A treatise on Early Irish History, Ethnology, the origin of the Round Towers, etc.
- A Complete Irish Dictionary (Dublin) – The beginning of it was published in The Nation and the final piece was not completed until his last illness.

== See also ==
- House of Burgh, an Anglo-Norman and Hiberno-Norman dynasty founded in 1193
