= 1979 visit by Pope John Paul II to Ireland =

1979 papal visit

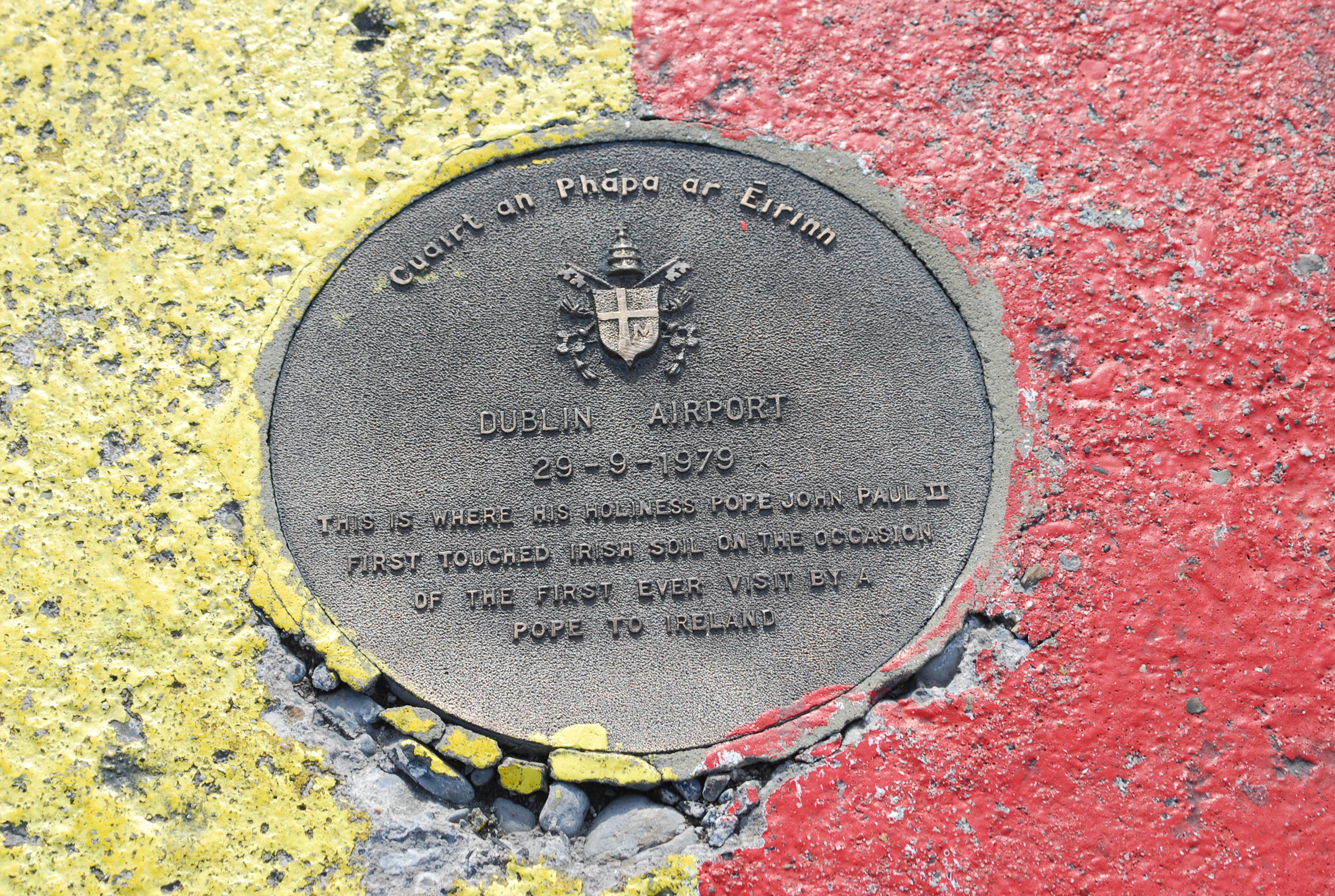
Point where Pope John Paul II touched Irish soil in 1979 in Dublin Airport.

Pope John Paul II visited Ireland from Saturday, 29 September to Monday, 1 October 1979, the first trip to Ireland by a pope. Over 2.5 million people attended events in Dublin, Drogheda, Clonmacnoise, Galway, Knock, Limerick, and Maynooth. It was John Paul's third foreign visit as Pope, who had been elected in October 1978. The visit marked the centenary of the reputed apparitions at the Shrine of Knock in August 1879.

== Visit ==
=== 29 September (Saturday) ===
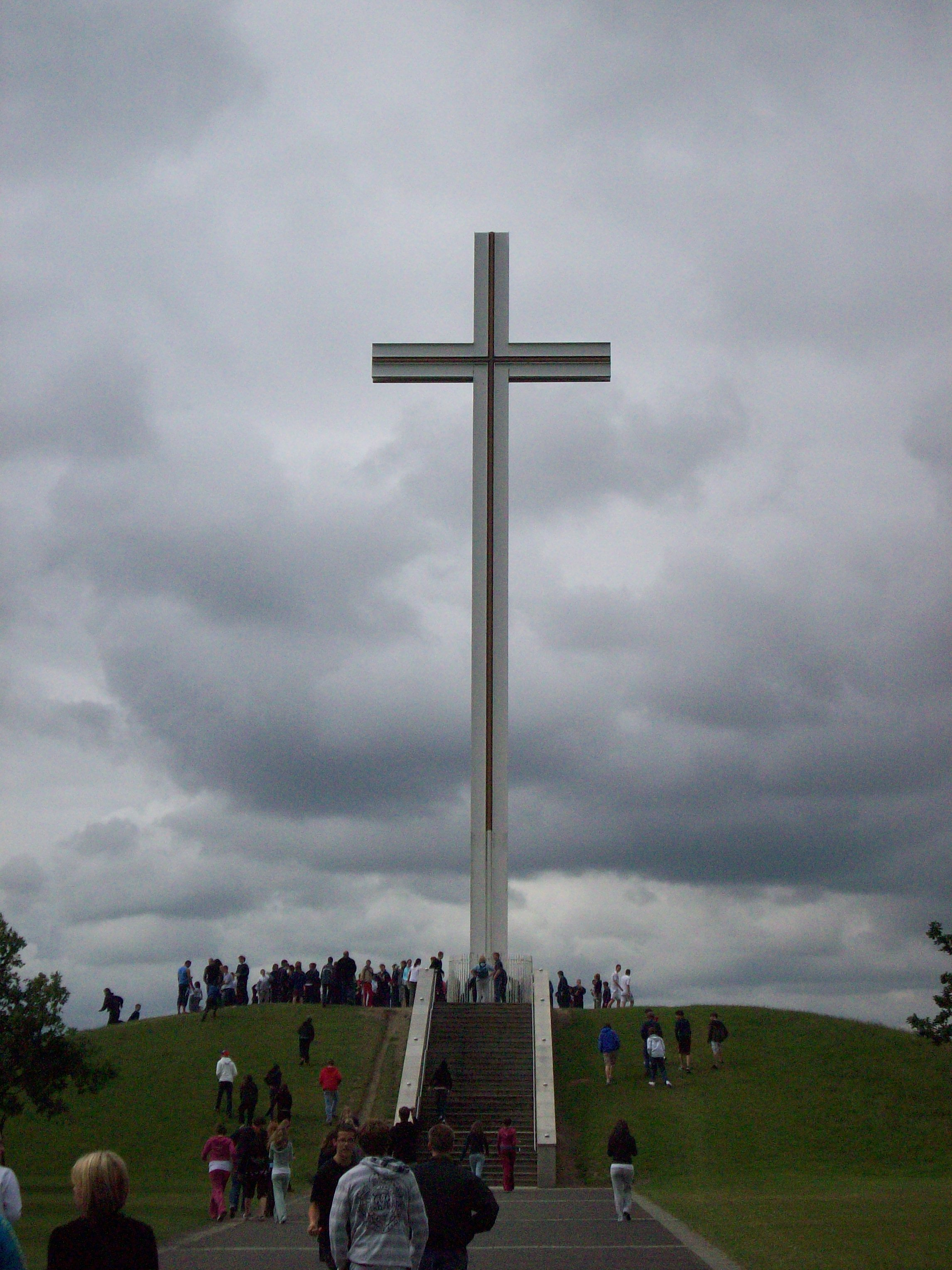
Papal Cross erected for the mass in Phoenix Park

An Aer Lingus Boeing 747, named St Patrick, brought Pope John Paul II from Rome to Dublin Airport. The Pope kissed the ground as he disembarked. After being greeted by the President of Ireland, Patrick Hillery, the Pope flew by helicopter to Phoenix Park, where he celebrated Mass for 1,250,000 people, one-third of the population of the Republic of Ireland.

Afterward, he travelled to Killineer, near Drogheda, where he led a Liturgy of the Word for 300,000 people, many from Northern Ireland. There, the Pope appealed to the men of violence: "On my knees, I beg you to turn away from the path of violence and return to the ways of peace".

The Pope had hoped to visit Armagh, but the security situation in Northern Ireland rendered it impossible. Drogheda was selected as an alternative venue as it is situated in the Catholic Archdiocese of Armagh.

Returning to Dublin that evening, the Pope was greeted by 750,000 people as he travelled in an open-top popemobile through the city centre and visited Áras an Uachtaráin, the residence of the Irish President. His final engagement was a meeting with journalists at the Dominican Convent in Cabra. The journalists from the international media broke into a spontaneous rendition of 'For he's a jolly good fellow' when the Pope arrived. Pope John Paul spent the night at the nearby Apostolic Nunciature on the Navan Road in Cabra.

=== 30 September (Sunday) ===
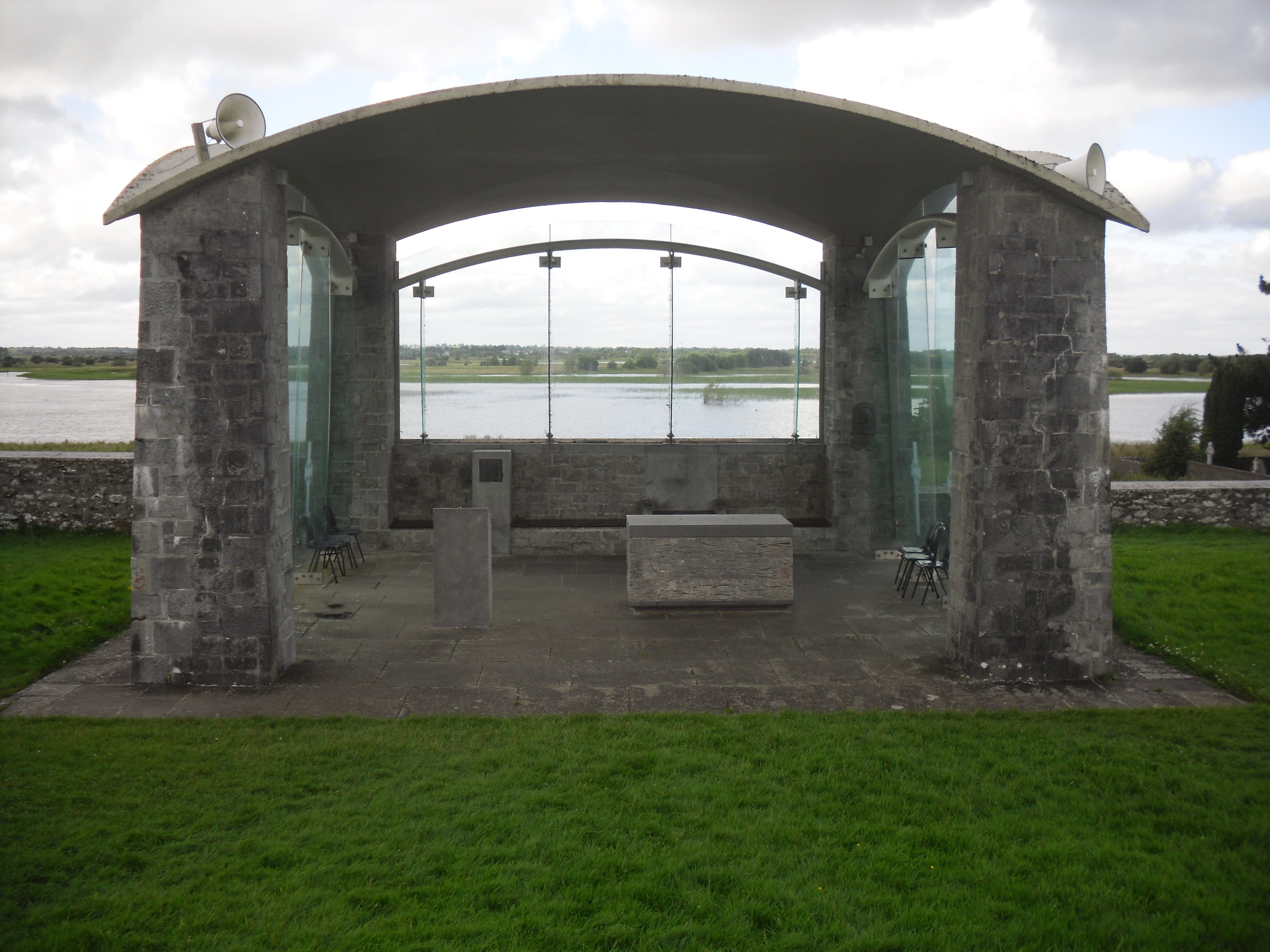
Altar used for Mass by Pope John Paul II while visiting Clonmacnoise

Pope John Paul began the second day of his tour with a short visit to the ancient monastery at Clonmacnoise in County Offaly. With 20,000 in attendance, he spoke of how the ruins were "still charged with a great mission". Later that morning he celebrated a Youth Mass for 300,000 at Ballybrit Racecourse in Galway. It was here that the Pope uttered perhaps the most memorable line of his visit: "Young people of Ireland, I love you". That afternoon, he travelled by helicopter to Knock Shrine in County Mayo which he described as "the goal of my journey to Ireland". The outdoor Mass at the shrine was attended by 450,000. The Pope met with the sick and elevated the church to the title of Basilica. He lit a candle at the Gable Wall for the families of Ireland. Monsignor James Horan, instrumental in the shrine's development, welcomed the Pope to Knock.

=== 1 October (Monday) ===
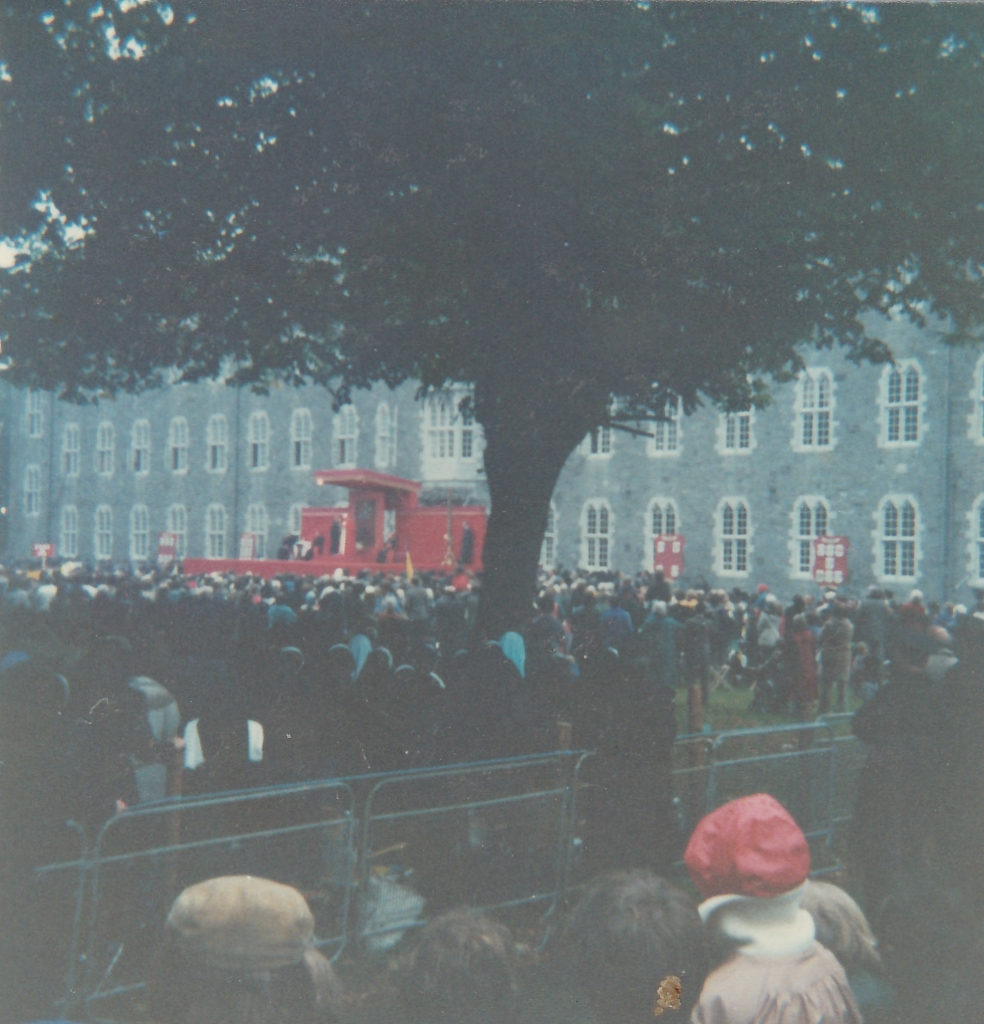
The Pope at St Patrick's College, Maynooth

The final day of the visit began with a brief early morning visit to St Patrick's College, Maynooth, the National Seminary, in County Kildare. Some 80,000 people joined 1,000 seminarians on the grounds of the college for the brief visit. A dense fog delayed the Pope's arrival from Dublin by helicopter. The final Mass of the Pope's visit to Ireland was celebrated at Greenpark Racecourse in Limerick before 400,000 people, many more than had been expected. The Mass was offered for the people of Munster. Pope John Paul left Ireland from nearby Shannon Airport travelling to Boston where he began a six-day tour of the United States.

== Aftermath ==
=== Speeches and homilies ===
Pope John Paul delivered 22 homilies and addresses during the course of this visit, including a televised message for the sick, broadcast on RTÉ on the evening of his arrival in Ireland. Audio files of his more significant speeches are preserved on the website of the Irish Catholic Bishops Conference.

At no point during his visit did the Pope address the crimes of the Irish Catholic Church perpetrated on children and unmarried mothers, and systematically concealed by its hierarchy including Bishop Brendan Comiskey, appointed by Pope John Paul II in 1984 only later to accept his resignation in 2002.

Irish independent record label Dolphin Records released a commemorative album of the visit entitled "Visit by Pope John Paul II to Ireland" which by 1983 was noted as their third best-selling album.

=== Auction ===
Many of the temporary fixtures and ornaments at the public masses were auctioned two months after the visit to help defray its cost. A Time Remembered - The Visit of Pope John Paul II to Ireland was produced by RTÉ in 2005.

=== Naming of children ===
Many children were named John and Paul in the aftermath of the papal visit. There were many Johns and Pauls beforehand but there was a huge increase in the number of children called after the Pope's taken names. Some children were also given both names as their Christian name and were known as John Paul in honour of the Pope's visit.

== See also ==
- The Pope's Children, a 2005 book by Irish journalist and economist David McWilliams which described the effects of the Celtic Tiger economic boom which affected those born at the time of the 1979 Pope visit
- World Meeting of Families 2018
- Pope Francis's visit to Ireland
