= Lacky Ó Máille =

Lacky Ó Máille (fl. 18th century) was an Irish friar and poet.

Ó Máille, called "the troubled friar" by Brien O'Rourke, was a native of Partry, County Mayo. He was expelled from a seminary "for rakish behaviour" by his cousin, an Athair Maolmhuire Ó Máille. This event inspired the first of two songs of his, both titled Leaici an Chuil Bhain.

He married a Widow Badger who ran an inn near Partry, but she was troubled by the unseemly attention he paid to other women. Few of his poems and songs have survived.
