= R300 road (Ireland) =

Road in Ireland

R300 road
- Bóthar R300
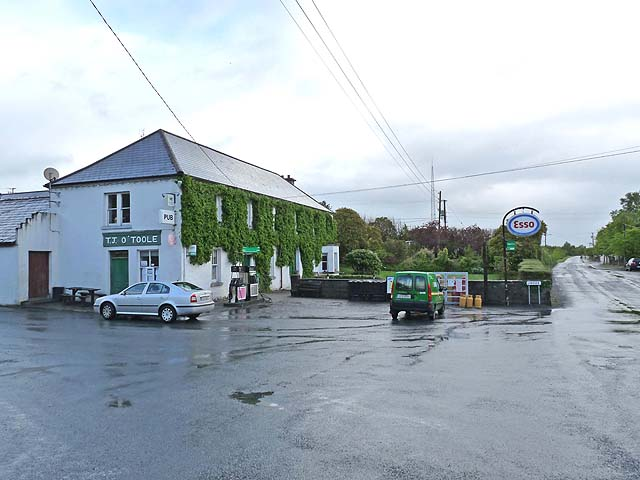
- Toormakeady, on the R300

Route information
- Length: 36.2 km (22.5 mi)

Location
- Country: Ireland
- Primary destinations: County Mayo; Cloonee (R330, N84); Crosses the Cloon River; Srah; Toormakeady; Crosses the Glensaul River; Crosses the Owenbrin River; Srahnalong; Crosses the Srahnalong River; Finny; Crosses the Owenamuck River; Crosses the Bunsooey River; Crosses Lough Mask; County Galway; Kilbeg; Clonbur (R345 road)

Highway system
- Roads in Ireland; Motorways; Primary; Secondary; Regional

The R300 road is a regional road in southwest County Mayo and north County Galway in Ireland. It connects the R330 road at Cloonee and the nearby N84 road at Partry to the R345 road at Clonbur (An Fhairche), 36.2 kilometres (22.5 mi) to the south (map). It passes through the area known as Joyce Country between the Partry Mountains and Lough Mask.

The government legislation that defines the R300, the Roads Act 1993 (Classification of Regional Roads) Order 2012 (Statutory Instrument 54 of 2012), provides the following official description:

R300: Partry, County Mayo — An Fhairche, County Galway

Between its junction with R330 at Ballynanerroon Beg in the county of Mayo and its junction with R345 at An Fhairche in the county of Galway via An tSraith, Tuar Mhic Éadaigh, Páirc an Doire, Sriath na Long and Fionnaithe in the county of Mayo; and An Choill Bheag in the county of Galway.

== See also ==
- List of roads of County Mayo
- National primary road
- National secondary road
- Regional road
- Roads in Ireland
