= R330 road (Ireland) =

Road in Ireland

R330 road
- Bóthar R330
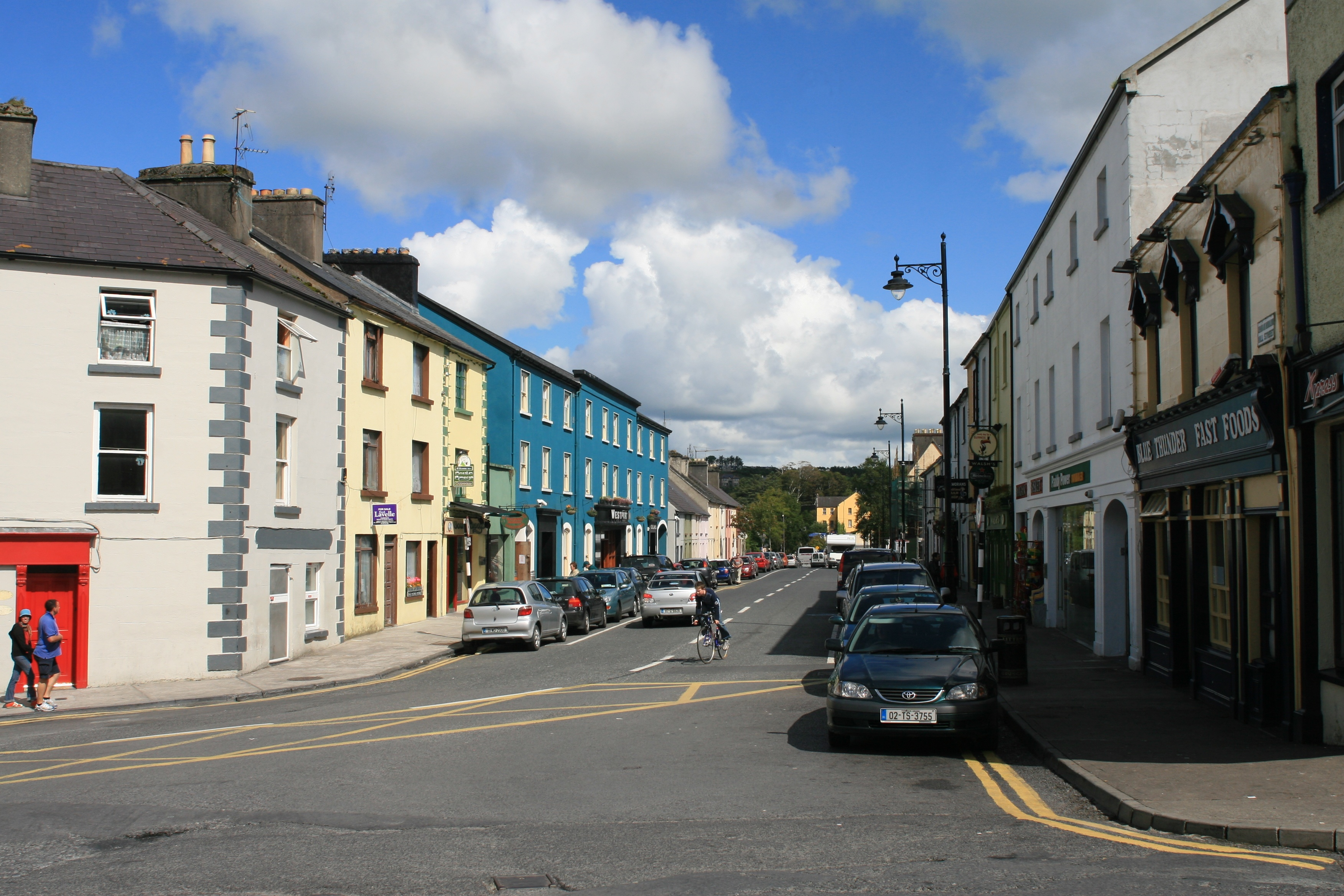
- Mill Street, Westport, on the R330

Route information
- Length: 21.9 km (13.6 mi)

Location
- Country: Ireland
- Primary destinations: County Mayo; Westport (N5, N59); Crosses the Carrowbeg River; Knockroosky; Aille; Crosses the Camoge River; Killavally; Cloonee; Crosses the Cloon River; R300 road; Ballynanerroon; Partry (N84)

Highway system
- Roads in Ireland; Motorways; Primary; Secondary; Regional

The R330 road is a regional road in west central County Mayo in Ireland. It connects the N5 and N59 roads at Westport to the N84 road at the village of Partry, 21.9 kilometres (13.6 mi) away (map). It meets the R300 road between Cloonee and Partry.

The government legislation that defines the R330, the Roads Act 1993 (Classification of Regional Roads) Order 2012 (Statutory Instrument 54 of 2012), provides the following official description:

R330: Westport — Partry, County Mayo

Between its junction with the N5 at Bridge Street in the town of Westport and its junction with N84 at Partry in the county of Mayo via Mill Street, Altamount Street and Ballinrobe Road in the town of Westport: Knockroosky, Aille, Killavally, Cloonee and Ballynanerroon in the county of Mayo.

== See also ==
- List of roads of County Mayo
- National primary road
- National secondary road
- Regional road
- Roads in Ireland
