= James Horan (monsignor) =

Irish priest (1911–1986)

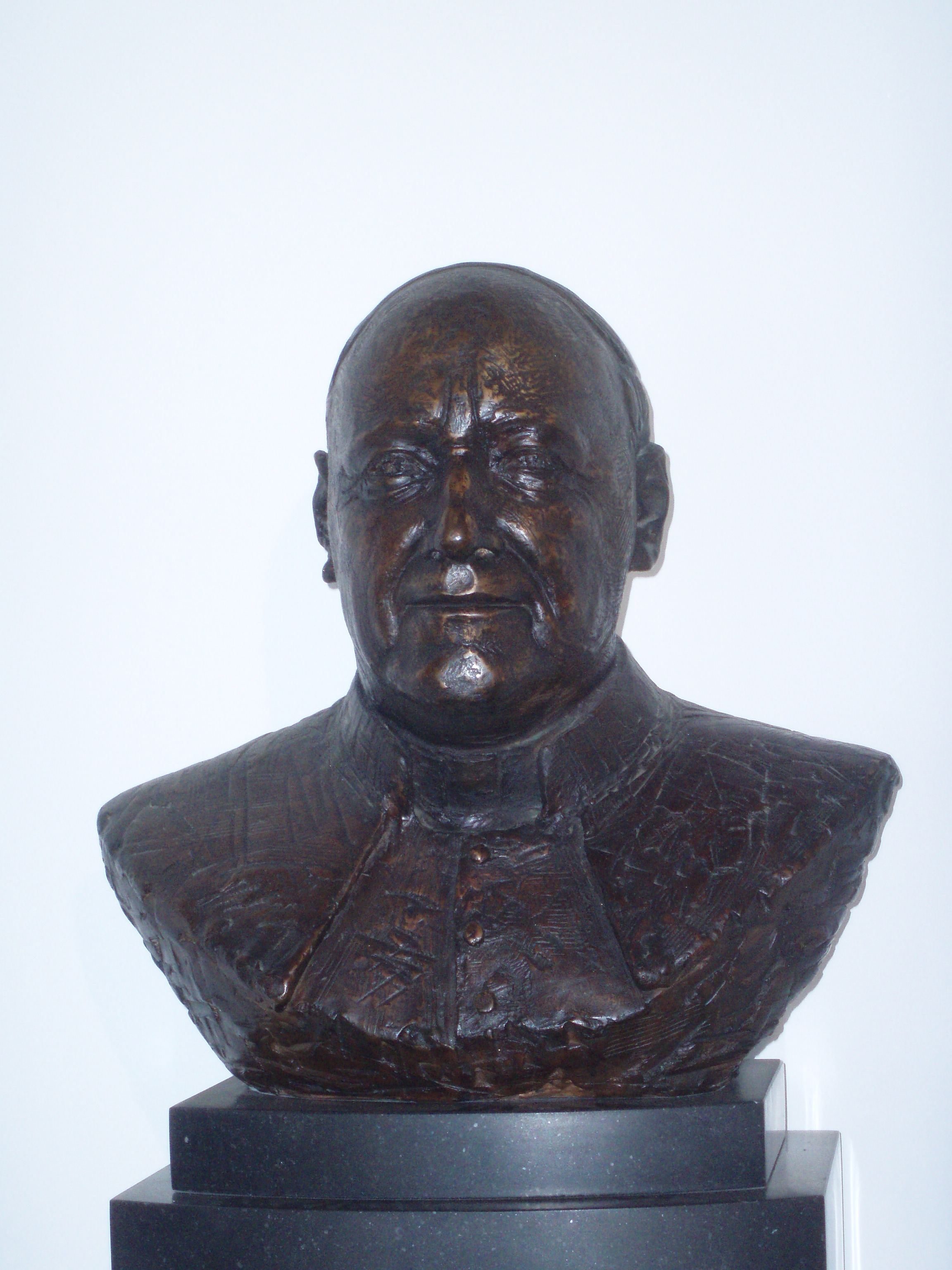
- A bust of Monsignor Horan in Ireland West Airport
- Born: 5 May 1911; Partry, County Mayo, Ireland
- Died: 1 August 1986 (aged 75); Lourdes, France
- Occupation: Priest
- Known for: The developer and founder of Ireland West Airport

James Horan (5 May 1911 – 1 August 1986) was an Irish priest. A parish priest of Knock, County Mayo, he is most widely known for his successful campaign to bring an airport to Knock, his work on Knock Basilica, and is also credited for inviting Pope John Paul II to visit Knock Shrine in 1979.

== Ecclesiastical career ==
Horan was born in Partry, County Mayo, and educated at St. Jarlath's College, Tuam. He trained for the priesthood in St Patrick's College, Maynooth. He was ordained in 1936, and his first post was in Glasgow, where he remained for three years. Having served as chaplain on an ocean liner and briefly in Ballyglunin, County Galway, he became curate in Tooreen, a small townland close to Ballyhaunis, County Mayo. While there, he organised the construction of a dance hall, which became a popular local amenity. He secured finance for the project by collecting £8,000 on a tour of American cities. After also serving in Cloonfad, County Roscommon, he was transferred to Knock in 1963, where he became parish priest in 1967. Horan was troubled by the struggles of daily life and mass emigration in the west of Ireland and he worked to improve the living standards of the local community.

== Knock shrine ==
While stationed at Knock, Horan oversaw the building of a new church for Knock Shrine, which was dedicated in 1976. The shrine was the stated goal of Pope John Paul II's visit in 1979. The pope travelled to Knock as part of a state visit to Ireland, marking the centenary of the famous Knock apparitions. Horan worked with Judy Coyne to organise the papal visit. He was responsible for the refurbishment of the church grounds, along with the construction of a huge church, with a capacity of 15,000. This newly constructed church was given the status of basilica by the pope. The day after the papal visit, Horan began his campaign to build an international airport in Barnacuige, a small village near Charlestown, County Mayo.

== Knock airport ==
Critics regarded the idea of an airport on a "foggy, boggy site" in Mayo as unrealistic, but funding was approved by the then Taoiseach, Charles Haughey, who performed the official opening in May 1986, five years after work commenced. Although Horan had secured IR£10,000,000 in funding from Haughey, following the Fianna Fáil party's defeat in the general election of 1982, his funding was cut, with the airport unfinished. Horan raised the IR£4,000,000 shortfall by holding a "Jumbo Draw". This large lottery succeeded in raising the required revenue, but only after a painstaking tour of several countries, including Australia and the United States. This took its toll on the ageing Horan and led to his death shortly after the completion of the airport. The airport was originally known as Horan International Airport, but is now officially referred to as Ireland West Airport.

== Death and legacy ==
Horan died while on a pilgrimage to Lourdes, just a few months after the official opening of the airport. His remains were flown into Knock, the first funeral to fly into the airport he had campaigned for. He was buried in the grounds of the Knock Basilica. His life and work were chronicled in a musical written by Terry Reilly and local broadcaster Tommy Marren, entitled A Wing and a Prayer. It premièred in The Royal Theatre in Castlebar, County Mayo, on 25 November 2010.

== Sources ==
- "History of Monsignor James Horan". Official Knock Shrine website. Archived from the original on 26 February 2006.
- "Transport Infrastructure in Mayo - Aviation". Ask About Ireland. Archived from the original on 3 February 2006.
- "Death notice in New York Times". New York Times. 2 August 1986.
- "Marian Shrine of Knock, Ireland". Sacred Destinations Travel Guide.
