= Knock, County Mayo =

Village in County Mayo, Ireland

Knock Cnoc Mhuire (Irish)
- Village
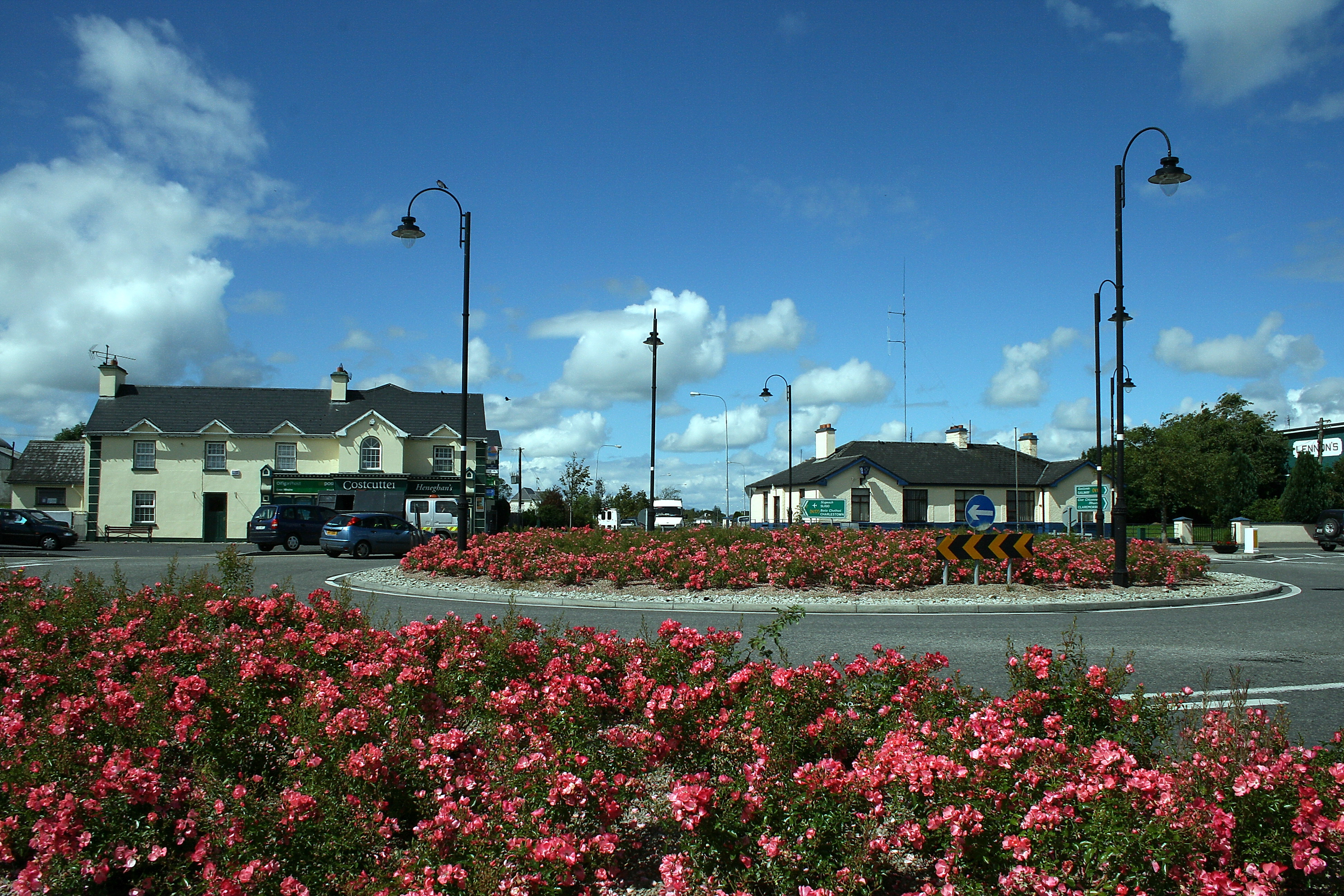
- The roundabout at Knock

- Location in Ireland
- Coordinates: 53°47′00″N 8°55′00″W
- Country: Ireland
- Province: Connacht
- County: County Mayo
- Elevation: 78 m (256 ft)

Population (2016)
  - Total: 972
- Time zone: UTC+0 (WET)
  - Summer (DST): UTC-1 (IST (WEST))
- Eircode: F12
- Irish Grid Reference: M396818

Knock (Irish: An Cnoc, meaning 'The Hill' – but now more generally known in Irish as Cnoc Mhuire, 'Hill of (the Virgin) Mary') is a village in County Mayo, Ireland.

Knock is also a civil parish in the ancient barony of Costello.

It is notable as the location of Knock Shrine - a Marian shrine and place of pilgrimage. According to Catholic beliefs, Mary, mother of Jesus, Saint Joseph and Saint John the Evangelist appeared to witnesses in the village on 21 August 1879. In the 20th century, Knock became one of Europe's most visited shrines to the Virgin Mary, along with Lourdes and Fatima. It was a focus of peace pilgrimages in Ireland during the Second World War, when the faithful prayed for peace. One and a half million pilgrims visit the shrine annually.

In 1979, on the centenary of the apparition, Pope John Paul II visited the shrine. On 26 August 2018, Pope Francis visited the basilica while in Ireland for the 9th World Meeting of Families.

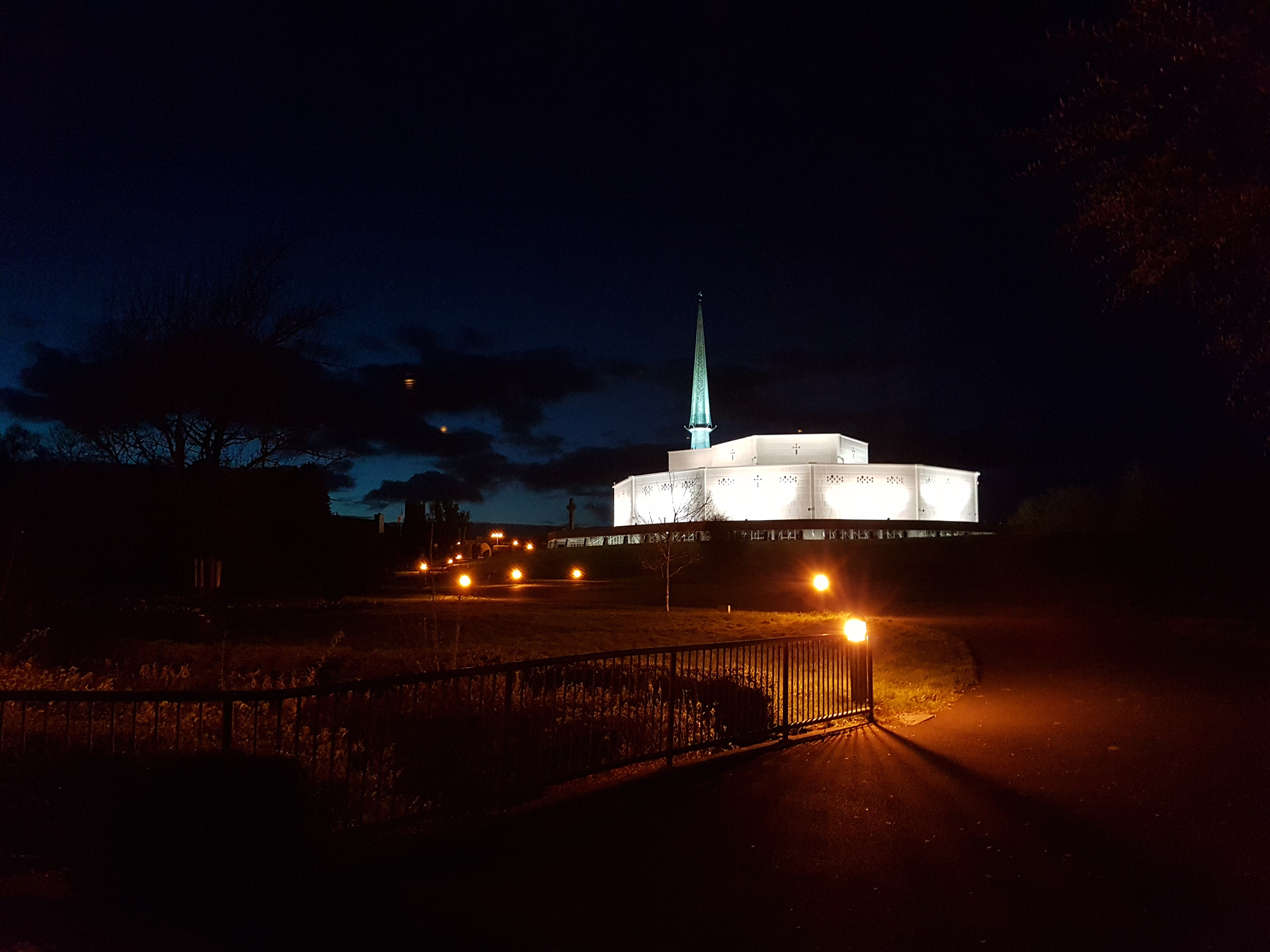
Knock Basilica

== Name ==
Knock comes from the Irish word "cnoc" meaning hill, historical evidence shows the village had been named that as far back as 1625. The Irish language name was changed to "Cnoc Mhuire" meaning the hill of the Virgin Mary after the visions. The parish and village of Knock is sometimes referred to historically and in Lewis' 1837 topographical dictionary as Knockdrumcalry (Cnoc Droma Chálraighe) meaning "hill of the ridge of the Cálraighe".

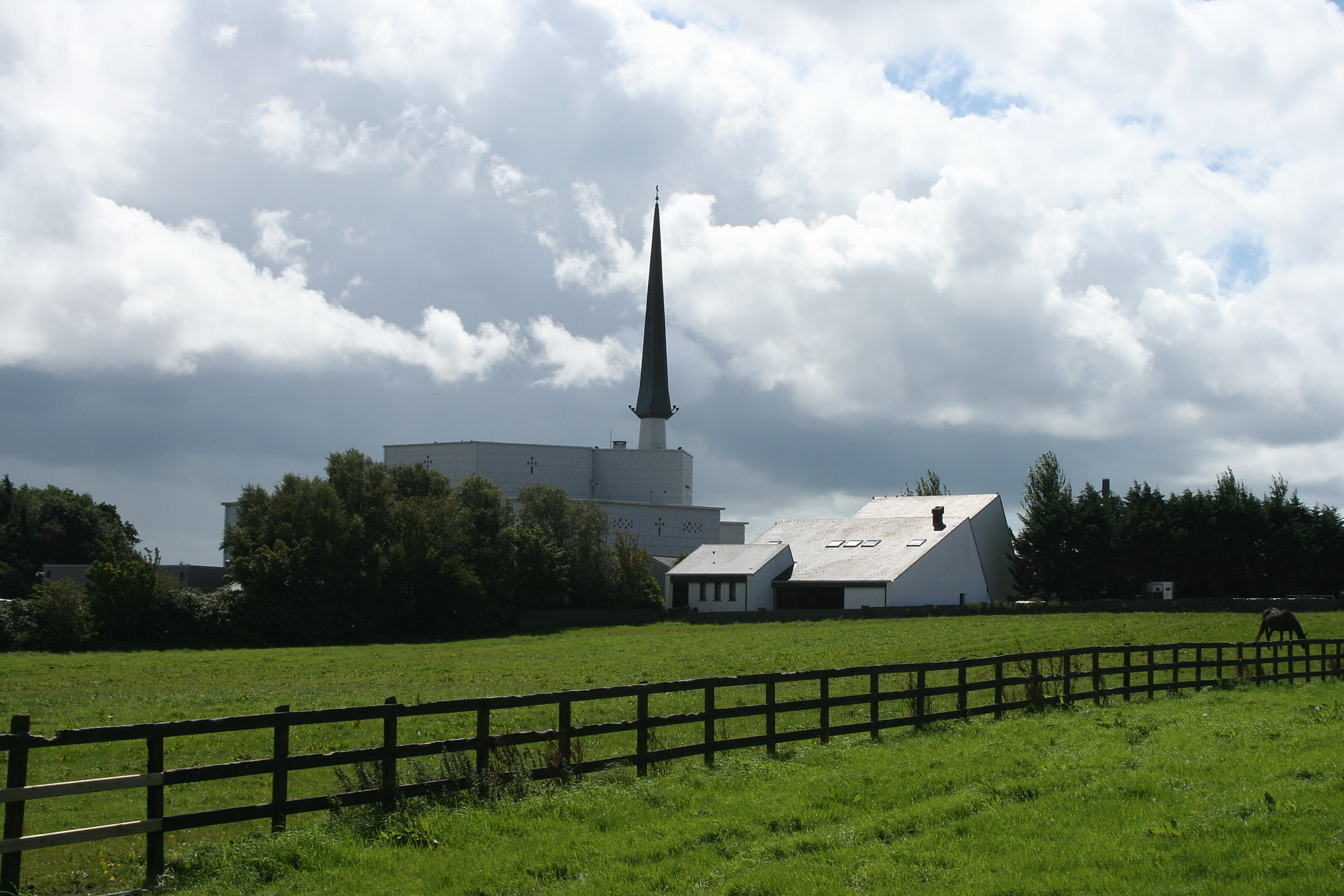
Knock Basilica

== Geography ==
The civil parish of Knock covers 45 townlands. Thirty five of the townlands are in the barony of Costello. The remaining 10 townlands along the central western boundary of the parish are in the neighbouring barony of Clanmorris. Knock is located five miles from the town of Claremorris (one of the major market towns of the early 19th century) and is between Claremorris and Ballyhaunis.

== Monsignor James Horan ==
Monsignor James Horan (1911–1986) became parish priest of Knock in 1963. During his tenure, he oversaw the construction of a new basilica church with a capacity for 10,000 worshipers. "Our Lady, Queen of Ireland" was consecrated in 1967. Monsignor Horan was also involved in the construction of the nearby Ireland West Airport. He was a leading advocate in issuing an invitation to Pope John Paul II to visit Knock in 1979 to commemorate the centenary of the Marian apparition.

== Education ==
The local primary school is Knock National School, built in 1966.

== Sport ==
The local soccer club is Kiltimagh Knock United F.C. established in 2002. Their ground, CMS Park, is situated in Cloonlee on the Knock/Kiltimagh Road, 3 km from the village. There is no other sports club located in the parish area and players from the village often play for Aghamore.

== Transport ==
Ireland West Airport, which is located 19 km (12 miles) to the north of the village on the N17 road near Charlestown, was opened by Monsignor James Horan on 30 May 1986 and has been an important tourism boost for the village and shrine.

== Climate ==
Climate data for Ireland West Airport: 201 m (659 ft) 1996–2020 normals
Month	Jan	Feb	Mar	Apr	May	Jun	Jul	Aug	Sep	Oct	Nov	Dec	Year
Record high °C (°F)	12.7 (54.9)	14.8 (58.6)	18.8 (65.8)	21.2 (70.2)	25.1 (77.2)	28.9 (84.0)	27.5 (81.5)	27.9 (82.2)	21.8 (71.2)	19.2 (66.6)	14.9 (58.8)	13.2 (55.8)	28.9 (84.0)
Mean daily maximum °C (°F)	6.7 (44.1)	7.3 (45.1)	8.9 (48.0)	11.3 (52.3)	14.3 (57.7)	16.2 (61.2)	17.3 (63.1)	17.1 (62.8)	15.4 (59.7)	12.2 (54.0)	8.9 (48.0)	7.0 (44.6)	11.9 (53.4)
Daily mean °C (°F)	4.3 (39.7)	4.6 (40.3)	5.8 (42.4)	7.7 (45.9)	10.4 (50.7)	12.6 (54.7)	13.9 (57.0)	13.8 (56.8)	12.2 (54.0)	9.3 (48.7)	6.4 (43.5)	4.7 (40.5)	8.8 (47.9)
Mean daily minimum °C (°F)	2.0 (35.6)	1.9 (35.4)	2.6 (36.7)	4.0 (39.2)	6.5 (43.7)	8.9 (48.0)	10.5 (50.9)	10.6 (51.1)	9.1 (48.4)	6.5 (43.7)	3.9 (39.0)	2.3 (36.1)	5.7 (42.3)
Record low °C (°F)	−5.8 (21.6)	−5.4 (22.3)	−6.8 (19.8)	−2.8 (27.0)	−0.7 (30.7)	2.6 (36.7)	5.9 (42.6)	5.8 (42.4)	3.4 (38.1)	−0.7 (30.7)	−4.5 (23.9)	−7.4 (18.7)	−7.4 (18.7)
Average precipitation mm (inches)	134.5 (5.30)	113.1 (4.45)	97.0 (3.82)	81.8 (3.22)	92.5 (3.64)	96.0 (3.78)	109.1 (4.30)	117.2 (4.61)	109.5 (4.31)	129.1 (5.08)	143.6 (5.65)	151.5 (5.96)	1,374.9 (54.12)
Mean monthly sunshine hours	48.1	62.3	101.6	144.6	173.9	144.8	120.9	120.1	100.6	85.2	55.3	39.1	1,196.5
Source: Met Éireann

== See also ==
- Knock Basilica, The Basilica of Our Lady, Queen of Ireland
- List of towns and villages in Ireland
- Marian apparition
