= List of rivers of Ireland =

This is an alphabetical list of the main rivers on the island of Ireland. It includes rivers that flow through the Republic of Ireland and Northern Ireland. Rivers that flow through Northern Ireland are marked with an asterisk (*). There are over 70,000 km of waterways in the Republic of Ireland contained in 3,192 river water bodies including rivers, streams, and tributaries. The major rivers have their length (in miles and kilometres) given. Also shown are two tables. Table 1 shows the longest rivers in Ireland with their lengths (in miles and kilometres), the counties they flow through, and their catchment areas (in km^{2}). Table 2 shows the largest rivers in Ireland (by mean flow) in cubic meters per second.

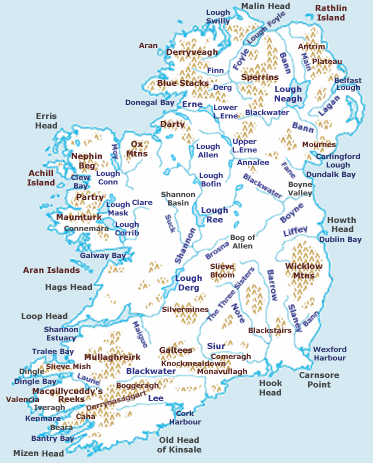
Some of the larger or better known rivers of Ireland are shown on this map (large version).

== Longest Irish Rivers (with Basin areas) ==
Lengths obtained from the Ordnance Survey of Ireland: Rivers and their Catchment Basins 1958 (Table of Reference), and for the rivers Bann and Erne – Notes on River Basins by Robert A. Williams

	River	Counties	Length	Basin Area
1	River Shannon (including estuary and flow through lakes)^{a}	Cavan, Leitrim, Roscommon, Longford, Westmeath, Galway, Offaly, Tipperary, Clare, Limerick, Kerry	360 km (224 mi)	16,800 km^{2}
2	River Barrow^{b}	Laois, Kildare, Kilkenny, Carlow, Wexford, Waterford	192 km (119 mi)	3,067 km^{2}
3	River Suir^{b}	Tipperary, Waterford, Kilkenny, Wexford	184 km (114.5 mi)	3,610 km^{2}
4	River Blackwater (Munster)	Kerry, Cork, Waterford	168 km (104.5 mi)	3,324 km^{2}
5	River Bann (including flow through L. Neagh)^{c}	Down, Armagh, Antrim, Londonderry	159 km (99 mi)	5,808 km^{2}
6	River Nore^{b}	Tipperary, Laois, Kilkenny	140 km (87 mi)	2,530 km^{2}
7	River Suck (Shannon)	Roscommon, Galway	133 km (83 mi)	1,600 km^{2}
8	River Liffey	Wicklow, Kildare, Dublin	132 km (82 mi)	1,256 km^{2}
9	River Erne	Cavan, Fermanagh, Donegal	129 km (80 mi)	4,372 km^{2}
10	River Foyle (including Rivers Mourne, Strule & Camowen)	Tyrone, Londonderry, Donegal	129 km (80 mi)	2,925 km^{2}
11	River Slaney	Wicklow, Carlow, Wexford	117 km (73 mi)	1,762 km^{2}
12	River Boyne	Kildare, Offaly, Meath, Louth	113 km (70 mi)	2,695 km^{2}
13	River Moy	Sligo, Mayo	101 km (62.5 mi)	2,086 km^{2}
14	River Clare (Corrib)^{d}	Mayo, Roscommon, Galway	93 km (58 mi)	1,108 km^{2}
15	River Blackwater (Ulster) (Bann) ^{c}	Tyrone, Monaghan, Armagh	92 km (57 mi)	1,507 km^{2}
16t	River Inny (Shannon)	Cavan, Longford, Westmeath	89 km (55.5 mi)	1,254 km^{2}
16t	River Lee	Cork	89 km (55.5 mi)	1,253 km^{2}
18	River Lagan	Down, Antrim	86 km (53.5 mi)	565 km^{2}
19	River Brosna (Shannon)	Westmeath, Offaly	79 km (49 mi)	1,248 km^{2}
20	River Laune (includes Lough Leane and River Flesk)	Kerry	76 km (47.25 mi)	829 km^{2}
21	River Feale (Shannon)	Cork, Limerick, Kerry	74 km (46 mi)	1,170 km^{2}
22	River Bandon	Cork	72 km (45 mi)	608 km^{2}
23	River Blackwater (Boyne)	Cavan, Meath	68 km (42.5 mi)	733 km^{2}
24	River Annalee (Erne)	Monaghan, Cavan	66.8 km (41.75 mi)	522 km^{2}
25	River Bride (M. Blackwater)	Cork, Waterford	64 km (40 mi)	419 km^{2}
26	Boyle River (including Lung River) (Shannon)	Mayo, Sligo, Roscommon	64 km (40 mi)	725 km^{2}
27	River Deel (Shannon)	Cork, Limerick	63.2 km (39.5 mi)	481 km^{2}
28	River Robe (Corrib)^{d}	Mayo	62.8 km (39.25 mi)	320 km^{2}
29	River Finn (County Donegal) (Foyle)	Donegal, Tyrone	62.8 km (39.25 mi)	505 km^{2}
30	River Maigue (Shannon)	Cork, Limerick	62 km (38.75 mi)	1,000 km^{2}
31	Fane River	Monaghan, Armagh, Louth	61.2 km (38.25 mi)	350 km^{2}
32	Ballisodare River	Sligo	60.8 km (38 mi)	650 km^{2}
33	River Dee (Louth)	Cavan, Meath, Louth	60.4 km (37.75 mi)	392 km^{2}
34	River Fergus (Shannon)	Clare	58.4 km (36.5 mi)	1,043 km^{2}
35	Little Brosna River (Shannon)	Offaly, Tipperary	57.6 km (36 mi)	662 km^{2}
36	Mulkear River (including Bilboa River) (Shannon)	Tipperary, Limerick	55.9 km (34.75 mi)	650 km^{2}
37	River Glyde (Co. Louth)	Cavan, Meath, Louth	55.9 km (34.75 mi)	348 km^{2}

TABLE 1

a

- The length of the River Shannon from the Shannon Pot to Limerick City is 258 kilometres (160 mi) with a basin area of 11,700 km^{2}.
- The River Shannon's overall length (to Loop Head), using the Owenmore River (County Cavan) as source, is 372 kilometres (231 mi), 11 km (7 mi) longer than the Shannon Pot source.
- The River Shannon's overall length (to Loop Head), using the Boyle River's furthest source, is 392.1 kilometres (243.6 mi), making the Boyle-Shannon river the longest natural stream flow (source to sea) in Ireland, 31.6 km (19.5 mi) longer than the Shannon Pot source.
- The River Shannon is a traditional freshwater river for just about 45% of its total length. Excluding the 102.2-kilometre (63.5 mi) tidal estuary from its total length of 360 kilometres (224 mi), if one also excludes the lakes (L. Derg 39 kilometres (24 mi), L. Ree 29 kilometres (18 mi), L. Allen 11 kilometres (7 mi) plus L. Boderg, L. Bofin, L. Forbes, L. Corry) from the Shannon's freshwater flow of 258.3 kilometres (160.5 mi), the Shannon as a freshwater river is only about 160 kilometres (100 mi) long.

b

- The total basin area of the Three Sisters (Barrow, Nore and Suir) is 9,207 km^{2}.

c

- The traditional length given for the River Bann is 80 miles (129 km) which is the combined total length of Upper and Lower Bann rivers and doesn't include Lough Neagh.
- The total length of the Ulster Blackwater from its source to the sea via L. Neagh and the Lower Bann is 186.3 km (115.75 mi), surpassed, in Ireland, only by the Shannon and Barrow rivers. This is the longest stream flow (source to sea) in Ulster.

d

- The total basin area of the 6 km River Corrib is 3,138 km^{2}
- The total length of the River Robe's journey from its source near Ballyhaunis to Galway Bay (via Lough Mask, Cong canal and river, Lough Corrib and River Corrib) is 72 miles (116 km). This is the longest stream flow (source to sea) within the Corrib Basin.

== Largest Irish Rivers (by flow) ==
	River (River Basin)	Mean Discharge (m^{3}/s)
1	River Shannon^{a}	209 (300)
2	River Corrib	105.5
3	River Bann^{b}	92 (102.5)
4	River Foyle	90
5	River Blackwater (Munster)	87.5
6	River Erne	85
7	River Suir^{c}	76
8	River Moy	63
9	River Barrow^{c}	46.5
10	River Laune	43
11	River Nore^{c}	42
12	River Lee	40
13	River Slaney	39
14	River Boyne	38.5
15	River Cong (Corrib)	37.6
16	River Feale (Shannon)	34.6
17	River Fergus (Shannon)	25.7
18	River Clare (Corrib)	22.9
19	River Suck (Shannon)	22.2
20	River Avoca	22
21	River Bandon	21.5
22	River Mourne (Foyle)	21.1
23	River Blackwater (Ulster) (Bann)	19.7
24	River Ballisodare	18.25
25	River Inny (Shannon)	18.4
26	River Liffey	17
27	River Derg (Foyle)	16.2
28	River Maigue (Shannon)	15.6
29	River Main (Bann)	15.4
30	River Blackwater (Boyne) (Boyne)	15.08
31	Aille River (Connacht) (Corrib)	15.0
32	Owenmore River (County Mayo)	14.7
33	Boyle River (Shannon)	13.57
34	River Deel (Shannon)	12.56
35	Mulkear River (Shannon)	12.55

TABLE 2

^{a} The River Shannon's 209 m^{3}/s is to Limerick City (Catchment area: 11,700 km^{2}). If the discharges from all of the rivers and streams into the Shannon Estuary (including the rivers Feale 34.6m^{3}/s, Maigue 15.6m^{3}/s, Fergus 25.7m^{3}/s, and Deel 7.4m^{3}/s) are added to the discharge at Limerick giving a total catchment of 16,865 km^{2}, the total discharge of the River Shannon at its mouth at Loop Head reaches 300 m^{3}/s

^{b} The River Bann's 92 m^{3}/s is to Movanagher Gauging station (Basin area 5209.8 km^{2}). The 102.5 m^{3}/s is based on the total basin area of 5808 km^{2} .

^{c} The Three Sisters (Barrow, Nore & Suir) total flow into Waterford Harbour is 154 m^{3}/s and the combined flow of the Barrow and Nore rivers is 86 m^{3}/s before joining the river Suir near Waterford City.

== A ==
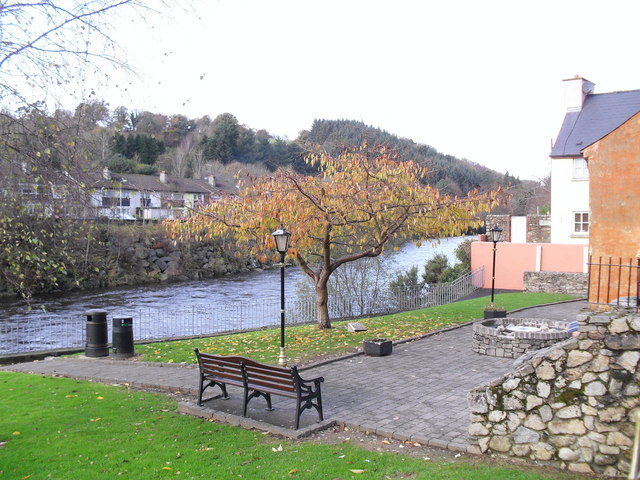
River Avoca

- Abbert River 25.25 miles (40.64 km)
- Aghinrawn* (Fermanagh) See Owenbrean River
- Agivey* 20.5 miles (33.0 km) (Londonderry)
- Aghadowey River
- Aherlow River 27 miles (43 km) (Tipperary)
- River Aille 18.5 miles (29.8 km)
- Allaghaun River 13.75 miles (22.13 km) (Limerick)
- River Allow 22.75 miles (36.61 km) (Cork)
- Allow, County Cork (Blackwater) 22.75 miles (36.61 km)
- Altalacky* (Londonderry)
- Annacloy* (Down)
- Annascaul (Kerry)
- River Annalee 41.75 miles (67.19 km)
- River Anner 23.5 miles (37.8 km) (Tipperary)
- River Ara 18.25 miles (29.37 km) (Tipperary)
- Argideen River 17.75 miles (28.57 km) (Cork)
- Arigna River 14 miles (23 km)
- Arney* (Fermanagh)
- Athboy River 22.5 miles (36.2 km) (Meath)
- Aughavaud River, County Carlow
- Aughrim River 5.75 miles (9.25 km) (Wicklow)
- River Avoca (Ovoca) 9.5 miles (15.3 km) (Wicklow)
- River Avonbeg 16.5 miles (26.6 km) (Wicklow)
- River Avonmore 22.75 miles (36.61 km) (Wicklow)
- Awbeg (Munster Blackwater) 31.75 miles (51.10 km)

== B ==
- Baelanabrack River 11 miles (18 km)
- Baleally Stream, County Dublin
- River Ballinamallard* 16 miles (26 km)
- Ballinascorney Stream, County Dublin
- Ballinderry River* 29 miles (47 km)
- Ballinglen River, County Mayo
- Ballintotty River, County Tipperary
- Ballintra River 14 miles (23 km)
- Ballisodare River 5.5 miles (8.9 km)
- Ballyboghil River, County Dublin, aka Ballyboughal
- Ballycassidy*
- Ballyfinboy River 20.75 miles (33.39 km)
- Ballymaice Stream, County Dublin
- Ballymeeny River, County Sligo
- Ballynahatty*
- Ballynahinch River* 18.5 miles (29.8 km)
- Ballyogan Stream, County Dublin
- Balsaggart Stream, County Dublin
- Bandon 45 miles (72 km)
- River Bann (Wexford) 26 miles (42 km)
- Bann* 90 miles (140 km) – longest river in Northern Ireland. Upper Bann flows into Lough Neagh and then continues north as the Lower Bann.

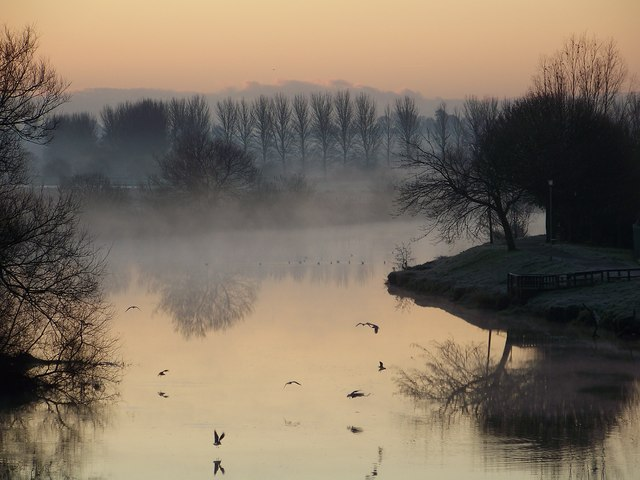
River Bann

- Bannagh*
- Barrow 119.5 miles (192.3 km)
- Bartramstown River, County Dublin
- Belderg River, County Mayo
- Bellanaminnaun River, County Mayo
- Bellawaddy River, County Sligo
- Bilboa River 19.5 miles (31.4 km)
- River Black 17.75 miles (28.57 km) County Mayo
- Blackbanks Stream, County Dublin
- Blackditch Stream, County Dublin
- Blackwater, Kerry
- River Blackwater, Kildare and Meath 20 miles (32 km)
- River Blackwater, Cavan and Meath 42.5 miles (68.4 km)
- Blackwater, Munster 104.5 miles (168.2 km)
- River Blackwater (Ulster)* 56.7 miles (91.2 km)
- Bloody Stream, Howth, County Dublin
- Boggeen Stream, County Dublin
- Boherboy Stream, County Dublin
- Boyle River (Total) 40 miles (64 km)
- River Boyne 70 miles (110 km)
- Bracken River, County Dublin
- Bracken, Balbriggan
- River Bradoge, County Dublin
- Breedoge River 11.75 miles (18.91 km)
- River Bride 40 miles (64 km) (Blackwater)
- River Bride 21 miles (34 km) (Lee)
- Bride's Glen Stream, County Dublin
- Bride's Stream, County Dublin
- Broad Meadow River, County Dublin

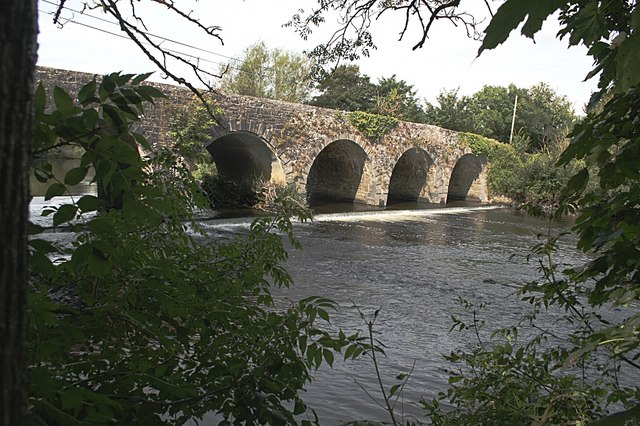
Munster Blackwater

- Brockey Stream, County Dublin
- Broghane Stream, County Kerry
- Brook Stream, County Dublin
- Brosna 49.25 miles (79.26 km)
- Brownsbarn Stream, County Dublin
- Bungosteen River 15.5 miles (24.9 km)
- Bunowen River (Galway) 16 miles (26 km)
- Bunowen River (Mayo) 13.25 miles (21.32 km)
- Bunratty River 25 miles (40 km)
- Burn Dale, County Donegal
- Burntollet*
- Burren River 24 miles (39 km)
- River Bush* 33.5 miles (53.9 km)

== C ==
- Cabragh River, County Sligo
- River Callan* 26.5 miles (42.6 km)
- River Camac, County Dublin
- River Camcor 16.25 miles (26.15 km)
- Camlin River 27 miles (43 km)
- Camlough*
- River Camogue
- Camowen River* 28 miles (45 km)
- Caragh River 14 miles (23 km)
- Carey*
- Colin River*
- Carn River, County Mayo
- Carrickbrack Stream, County Dublin
- Carrickmines River, County Dublin
- River Clare (via Lough Corrib) 57.75 miles (92.94 km)
- Carrowbeg 10 miles (16 km)
- Carryduff*
- Carysfort-Maretimo Stream, County Dublin
- Cashla River 13.25 miles (21.32 km)
- Castle Stream, County Dublin
- Castletown River 28 miles (45 km)
- Cemetery Drain, County Dublin
- River Cladagh* (including Arney) 22 miles (35 km)
- Clady River*
- Clanrye*
- Claremont Stream, County Dublin
- River Clarin 19.75 miles (31.78 km)
- River Clodiagh 20.5 miles (33.0 km)
- Clodiagh River 24.25 miles (39.03 km)
- Cloghfin River 14 miles (23 km)
- Cloonaghmore River 19.75 miles (31.78 km)
  - Colebrooke River* 35 miles (56 km)
- River Colligan 15 miles (24 km)
- Commons Water, County Dublin
- Coolcour Brook, County Dublin
- Corduff River, County Dublin

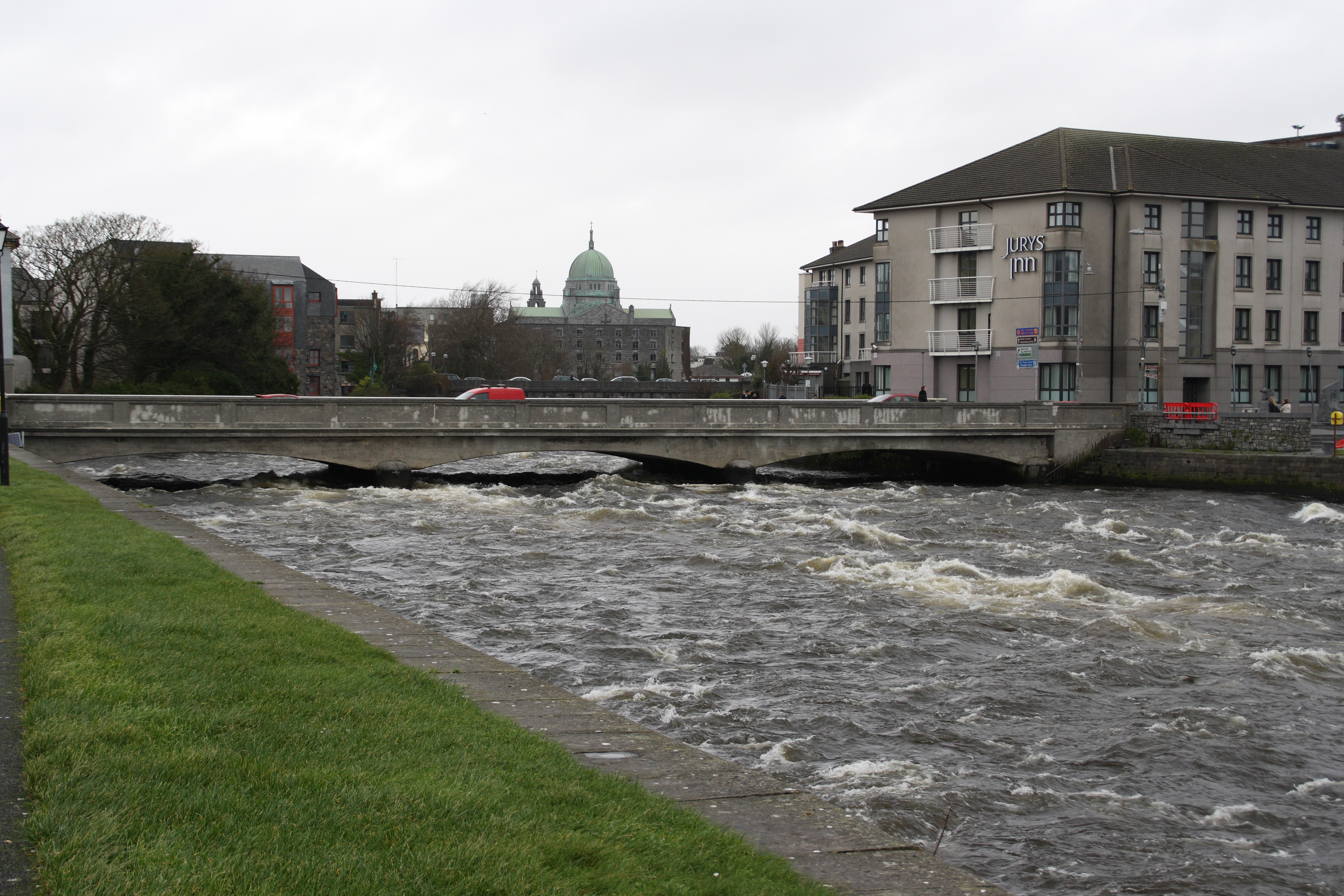
River Corrib

- River Corrib 5.75 miles (9.25 km)
- Cot Brook, County Dublin
- County Brook, County Dublin
- River Crana 12 miles (19 km)
- Cregg River (via Lough Corrib)
- Creosote Stream, County Dublin
- Crinken Stream, County Dublin
- Crompaun River, County Clare
- Crumlin*
- Cuckoo Stream, County Dublin
- Cully Water 14.5 miles (23.3 km)
- Cumber*
- Cummeragh River 9.5 miles (15.3 km)
- Cusher River* 25 miles (40 km)

== D ==
- Dale River 22.5 miles (36.2 km)
- Dall*
- River Dalua 15.5 miles (24.9 km)
- River Dargle 12.5 miles (20.1 km)
- River Dee, County Louth 37.75 miles (60.75 km)
- River Deel 39.5 miles (63.6 km)
- Deel River 28 miles (45 km)
- River Deele 25.5 miles (41.0 km) (see the Burn Dale)
- Dennett*
- River Derg* 28 miles (45 km)
- Derreen River 25 miles (40 km)
- River Derry 21 miles (34 km)
- Delvin River, County Dublin
- Devlin River, County Sligo
- Dervock*
- River Diran 24.75 miles (39.83 km)
- River Dodder 17 miles (27 km)
- River Doonbeg 25.75 miles (41.44 km)
- Dooyertha River 23.75 miles (38.22 km)
- Drimnagh Castle Stream, County Dublin
- River Drish 19.75 miles (31.78 km)
- Dromaddamore River, County Kerry
- Dromore River* 23.25 miles (37.42 km)
- Drumquin River* 9.5 miles (15.3 km)
- Drumragh River* 20.5 miles (33.0 km)
- Duff* 13.25 miles (21.32 km)
- Dun* (Glendun) 12 miles (19 km)

== E ==
- Easky River, County Sligo 18.5 miles (29.8 km)
- Elm Park Stream, County Dublin
- Enler, County Down
- River Erkina 22.5 miles (36.2 km)
- River Erne* 80 miles (130 km)
- River Erriff 20.5 miles (33.0 km)
- River Eske 15.25 miles (24.54 km)

== F ==
- River Fane, County Louth 38.25 miles (61.56 km)
- Fairy Water 17.75 miles (28.57 km)
- Farset*
- River Faughan* 29.5 miles (47.5 km)
- River Feale 46 miles (74 km)
- River Fergus 36.5 miles (58.7 km)
- Feorish River 19.5 miles (31.4 km)
- River Ferta, County Kerry
- Fettercairn Stream, County Dublin
- Fiddaun River, County Mayo
- Figile River (Kildare) 20.75 miles (33.39 km)
- Finglas River, County Dublin
- Finglaswood Stream, County Dublin
- River Finisk 17.5 miles (28.2 km)
- River Finn (County Donegal) (Foyle) – rises and flows mainly through County Donegal, Republic of Ireland 39.25 miles (63.17 km)
- River Finn (Erne tributary) (Erne) 31.5 miles (50.7 km)
- Finned River, County Sligo
- River Flesk 28.25 miles (45.46 km)
- Flurry River, County Louth*
- Forrest Little Stream, County Dublin

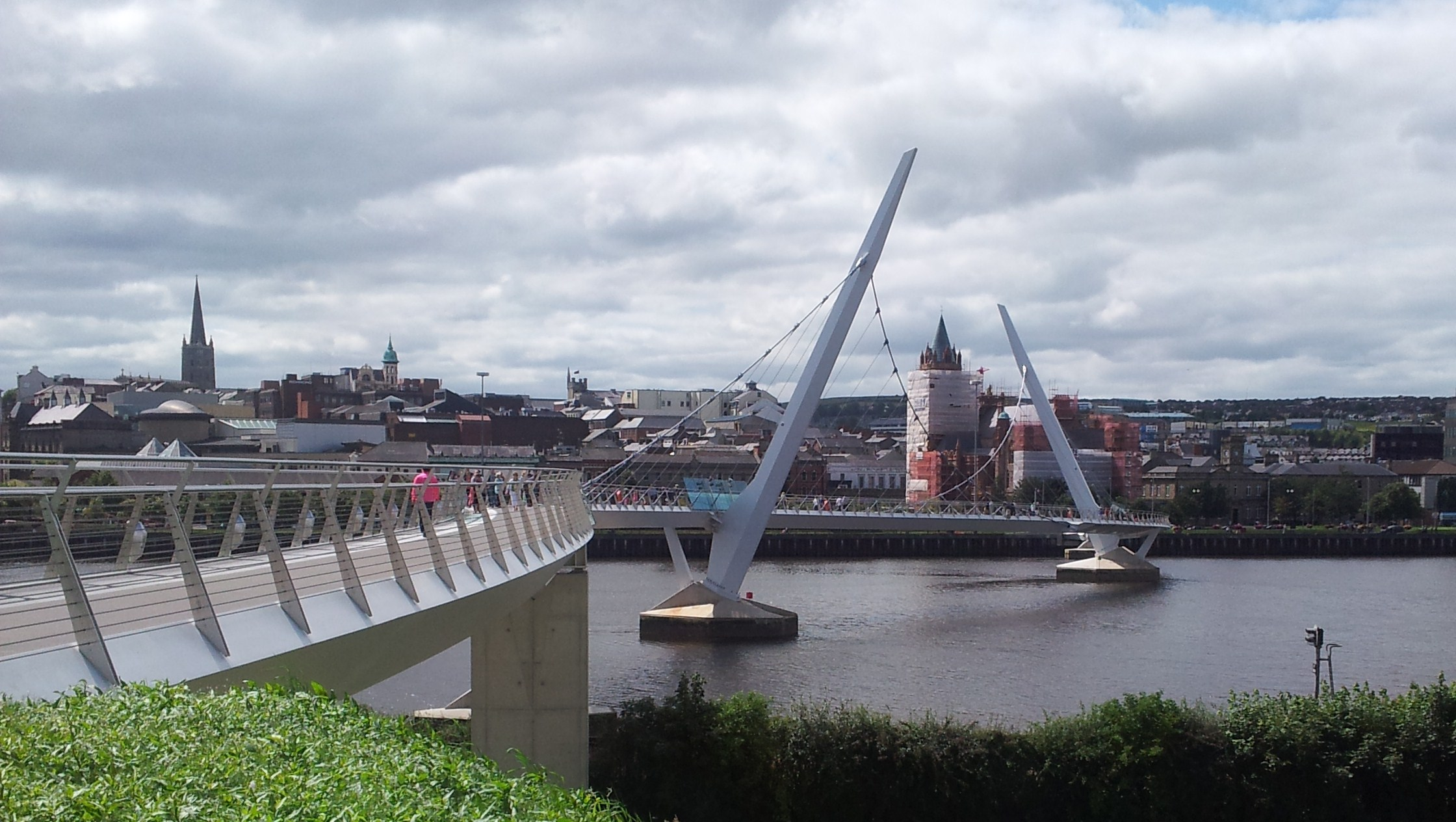
River Foyle

- River Foyle* 80 miles (130 km) (total) – that portion named "Foyle" forms the border between the Republic of Ireland and Northern Ireland
- Fox Stream, County Dublin
- Foxrock Stream, County Dublin
- River Funshion 34.75 miles (55.92 km)
- Fury*
- Furry Glen Stream, County Dublin

== G ==
- River Galey 27 miles (43 km)
- Gallanstown Stream, County Dublin
- Gallblack Stream, County Dublin
- River Garavogue (including L. Gill and R. Bonnet) 31.5 miles (50.7 km)
- Gaybrook Stream, County Dublin
- Glashaboy River 15 miles (24 km)
- Glashoreag River, County Kerry
- Glasthule Stream, County Dublin
- Glen*
- Glenamoy River County Mayo 13.75 miles (22.13 km)
- Glenamuck Stream, County Dublin
- Glenariff*
- Glenaulin Stream, County Dublin
- Glencullen River, County Dublin and County Wicklow
- Glendergan*
- Glenelly River* 22 miles (35 km)
- Glenglassera River, County Mayo
- Glenmornan*
- Glenulra River, County Mayo
- River Glore 17 miles (27 km)
- River Glyde 34.75 miles (55.92 km)
- Golf Stream, County Dublin
- River Goul 23.25 miles (37.42 km)
- Grange Stream, County Dublin
- Grange River (Corrib) 17 miles (27 km)
- River Greese 22 miles (35 km)
- Griffeen River, County Dublin
- Grillagh River
- River Gweebarra 19.75 miles (31.78 km)
- Gweestin River 13.75 miles (22.13 km)
- Gweestion River (Moy) 23 miles (37 km)

== H ==
- Hampstead Stream, County Dublin
- Hazelbrook Stream, County Dublin
- Heathfield River, County Mayo
- Hurley River, County Dublin

== I ==
- River Ilen County Cork 20.75 miles (33.39 km)
- River Inagh 22.75 miles (36.61 km)
- River Inny (Leinster) 55.5 miles (89.3 km)
- River Inny (County Kerry) 16.5 miles (26.6 km)

== J ==
- Jobstown Stream, County Dublin
- John's
- Joan Slade River, County Kildare

== K ==
- Keady*
- Kealy's Stream, County Dublin
- Kells*
- Kilbarrack Stream, County Dublin
- Kilbroney*
- Kilcolgan River 9.5 miles (15.3 km)
- Kill o' the Grange Stream, County Dublin
- Kings River 28.75 miles (46.27 km)
- Knockoneil River

== L ==
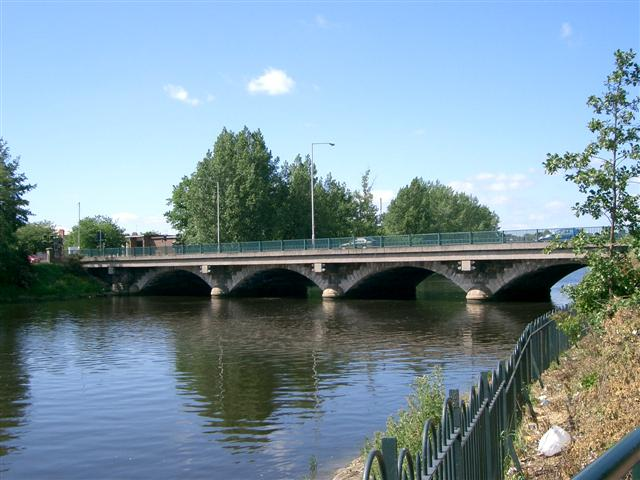
River Lagan

- River Lagan* 53.5 miles (86.1 km)
- River Laune 14 miles (23 km)
- Leaffony River, County Sligo 8 miles (13 km)
- River Lee 55.5 miles (89.3 km)
- River Lennon (Leannan) 28.5 miles (45.9 km)
- River Liffey, County Wicklow, County Kildare, and County Dublin 82 miles (132 km)
- Lissenhall Stream, County Dublin
- Little Brosna River 36 miles (58 km)
- Little Dargle River, County Dublin
- Lung River (Boyle) 17.75 miles (28.57 km)
- Lyreen River, County Kildare

== M ==
- Mabestown Stream, County Dublin
- Macosquin River River Rhee
- Magazine Stream, County Dublin
- River Mahon 15.75 miles (25.35 km)
- River Maigue 38.75 miles (62.36 km)
- River Main* 34 miles (55 km)
- River Maine 26.5 miles (42.6 km)
- Mareen's Brook, County Dublin
- Manulla River 19 miles (31 km)
- Mayne River, County Dublin
- Mill Stream, County Dublin
- Milverton Stream, County Dublin
- Monkstown Stream, County Dublin
- Mournebeg River* 17.25 miles (27.76 km)
- Mourne*
- River Moy 62.5 miles (100.6 km)
- Moygannon River
- Moynalty River 23.5 miles (37.8 km)
- Moyola River* 31 miles (50 km)
- Muckross Stream, County Dublin
- Mulkear River 15.25 miles (24.54 km)
- Munkin River, County Mayo

== N ==
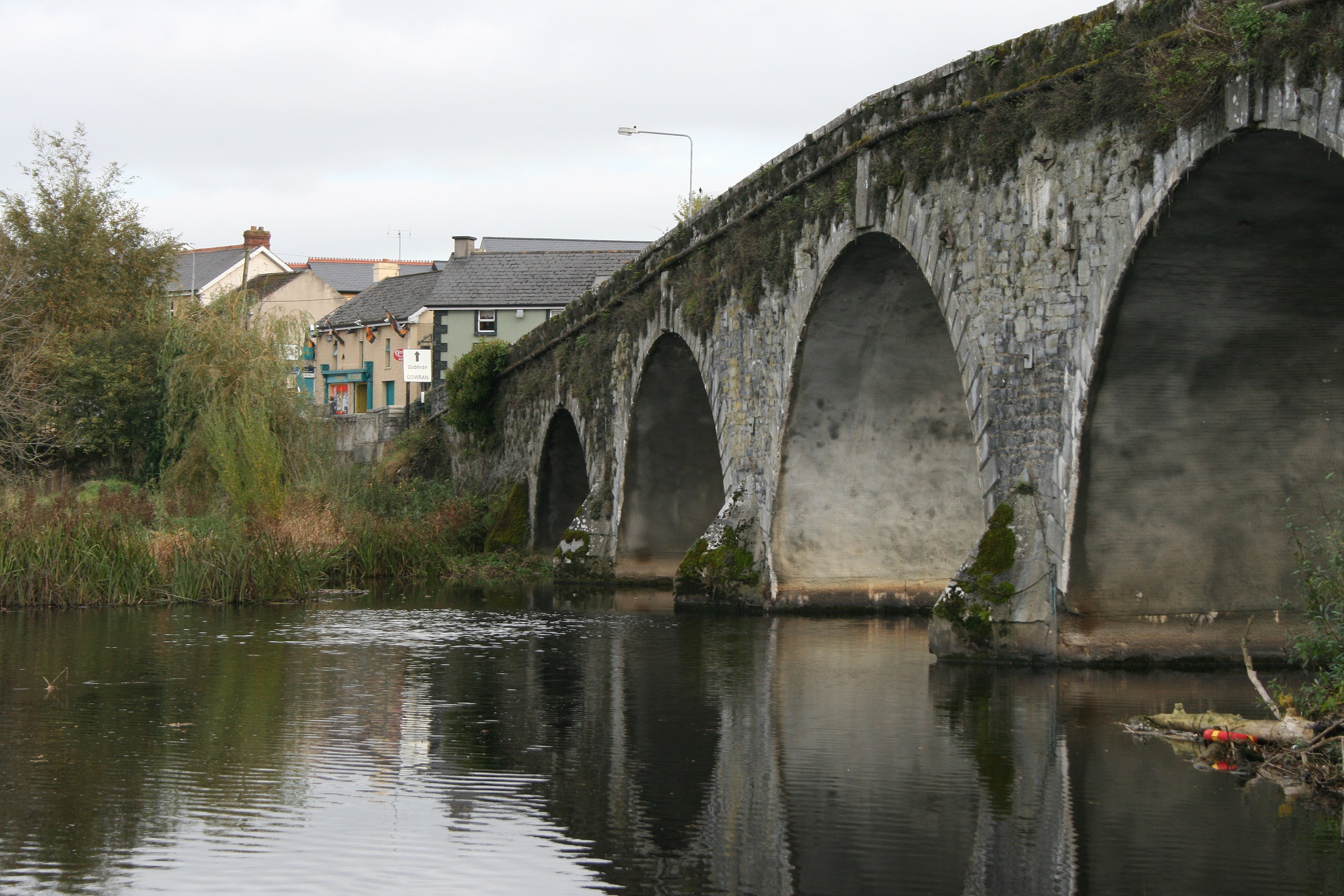
River Nore at Bennettsbridge

- Naniken River, County Dublin
- River Nanny 17 miles (28 km)
- Nenagh River 28.5 miles (45.9 km)
- Newport River 18.25 miles (29.37 km)
- Newry (Clanrye) River, 27 miles (43 km)
- River Nore 87.75 miles (141.22 km)
- Nutley Stream, County Dublin

== O ==
- Offington Stream, County Dublin
- Oily River 13 miles (21 km)
- Ollatrim River (Tipperary) 18.5 miles (29.8 km)
- Oona Water* 17.75 miles (28.57 km)
- River Owenabue 20.5 miles (33.0 km)
- Owenacurra River 13.25 miles (21.32 km)
- Owenaher River, County Louth
- Owenass River, County Laois
- Owenbeg River 14.75 miles (23.74 km)
- Owenbehy River, County Mayo
- Owenboliska River 13.25 miles (21.32 km)
- Owenbrean* 5 mi (8.5 km)
- Owendoher River, County Dublin
- Owenduff River 17.75 miles (28.57 km)
- Owenea River 16.25 miles (26.15 km)
- Owengarve River 16 miles (26 km)
- Owenglin River 11.5 miles (18.5 km)
- Owenmore River (County Cavan) (Glangevlin) 9 miles (14 km)
- Owenmore River (County Mayo) (via Carrowmore Lough) 29.25 miles (47.07 km)
- Owenmore River (County Sligo) (via Templehouse Lough) 32.5 miles (52.3 km)
- Owenkillew River 30 miles (48 km)
- Owenreagh River 14 miles (23 km)
- River Owenroe (Moynalty) 23.5 miles (37.8 km)
- River Owentaraglen 17.25 miles (27.76 km)

== P ==
- Philipstown River (Barrow) 15.75 miles (25.35 km)
- Pil River, County Kilkenny
- East Pinkeen Stream, County Dublin
- West Pinkeen Stream, County Dublin
- Piperstown Stream, County Dublin
- River Poddle, County Dublin
- Pollymounty River, County Carlow, also spelled Pollmounty or Poulmonty.
- Portrane Stream, County Dublin
- Priory Stream, County Dublin

== Q ==
- Quiggery*
- River Quoile 27.5 miles (44.3 km)

== R ==
- Racecourse Stream, County Dublin
- River Reelan* 10.5 miles (16.9 km)
- Richardstown River, County Dublin
- River Robe (via Loughs Mask and Corrib) 39.25 miles (63.17 km)
- Robinhood Stream, County Dublin
- River Roe* 34.25 miles (55.12 km)
- Roogagh*
- Rosserk River, County Mayo
- Roughty River 16.75 miles (26.96 km) (flowing into Kenmare Bay) at Kenmare
- Routing Burn 13 miles (21 km)
- Rush Town Stream, County Dublin
- River Rye 15.5 miles (24.9 km)

== S ==
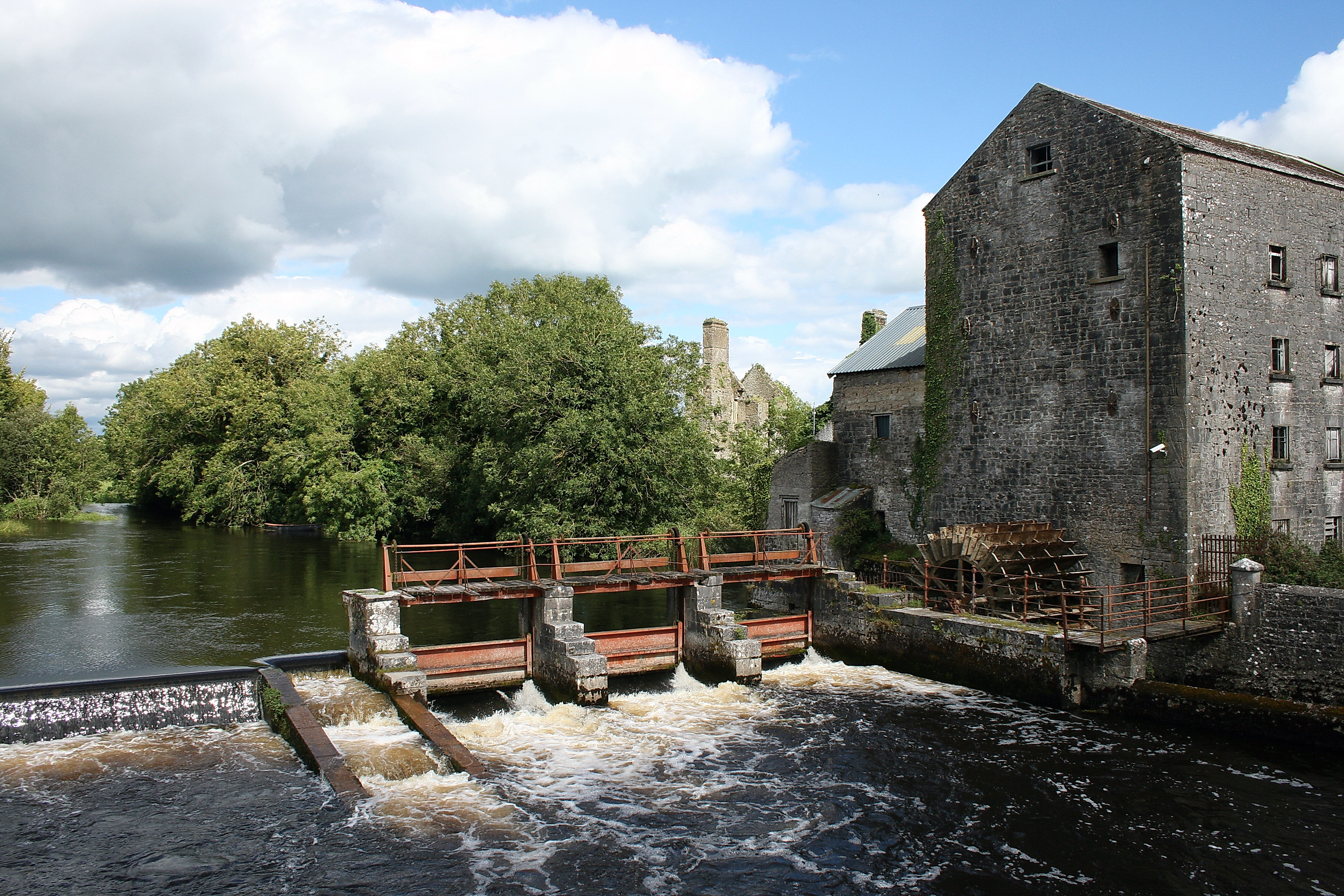
River Suck

- St. Laurence's Stream, County Dublin
- St. Margaret's Stream, County Dublin
- Santa Sabina Stream, County Dublin
- Santry River, County Dublin
- Scribblestown Stream, County Dublin
- Shallon Stream, County Dublin
- Shanganagh River, County Dublin
- River Shannon 224 miles (360 km) – longest river on the island. Develops into Lough Allen, Lough Bofin, Lough Ree and Lough Derg along its course.
- Shanow River 15.25 miles (24.54 km)
- Shimna*
- River Shiven 21.25 miles (34.20 km)
- Shournagh River 17 miles (27 km)
- Sillees River* 33 miles (53 km)
- Silver River 24 miles (39 km)
- Six Mile Water* 21 miles (34 km)
- Slade Brook, County Dublin
- River Slaney, County Wicklow, County Carlow and County Wexford 73 miles (117 km)
- Slang River, County Dublin
- River Slate 17 miles (27 km)
- Sluice River, County Dublin
- Smerlagh (Smaorlagh) River 15.5 miles (24.9 km)
- Sruh Croppa*
- Stein River, County Dublin
- Stonestown River 20 miles (32 km)
- Stoneyford
- River Strule* 14.25 miles (22.93 km)
- River Suck 82.5 miles (132.8 km)
- River Suir 114.75 miles (184.67 km)
- River Sullane 22.5 miles (36.2 km)
- Swan River, County Dublin
- River Swanlinbar 18 miles (29 km) (also known as Cladagh)*
- River Swilly 25.5 miles (41.0 km)

== T ==
- Tallaght Stream, County Dublin
- River Tall* 22.5 miles (36.2 km)
- River Tang 15.5 miles (24.9 km)
- River Tar 18.75 miles (30.18 km)

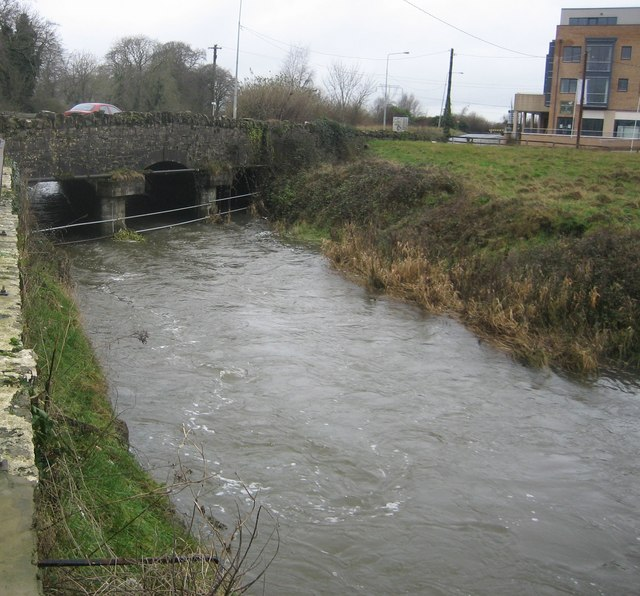
River Tolka

- Torrent*
- Tempo*
- Termon*
- Three Arches*
- Threemilewater*
- River Tolka 20.75 miles (33.39 km)
- River Torrent* 25 miles (40 km)
- River Triogue 16.75 miles (26.96 km)
- Trimleston Stream, County Dublin
- Tromanallison, County Dublin
- Tullamore River 12.5 miles (20.1 km)
- Turnapin Stream, County Dublin
- Turvey River, County Dublin

== U ==
- Unshin River 14.25 miles (22.93 km)
- Upper Ballinderry*

== V ==
- River Vartry, County Wicklow 20.5 miles (33.0 km)
- Viceregal Stream, County Dublin

== W ==
- Wad River, County Dublin
- Walkinstown Stream, County Dublin
- Ward River, County Dublin
- Ward River, Fingal
- White River, County Limerick
- White River, County Louth
- Whitechurch Stream, County Dublin
- Whitewater Brook, County Dublin
- Wimbletown Stream, County Dublin
- River Womanagh 19 miles (31 km)
- River Woodford 18.5 miles (29.8 km)

== Y ==
- Yellow River 17.25 miles (27.76 km)

== See also ==
- Rivers of Ireland
- List of rivers of County Dublin
- List of rivers of County Mayo
- List of canals in Ireland
- List of loughs of Ireland
- Waterways Ireland
- Rivers Agency

== External sources ==
- Irish whitewater River Guides
