= Rivers of Ireland =

Overview of rivers in Ireland

Shown here are all the major rivers and tributaries of Ireland with their lengths (in kilometres and miles). Starting with the Ulster rivers, and going in a clockwise direction, the rivers (and tributaries) are listed in regard to their entry into the different seas: the Irish Sea, the Celtic Sea and the Atlantic Ocean. Also shown are two tables. Table 1 shows the longest rivers in Ireland with their lengths (in kilometres and miles), the counties they flow through, and their catchment areas (in square kilometres). Table 2 shows the largest rivers in Ireland (by mean flow) in cubic metres per second.

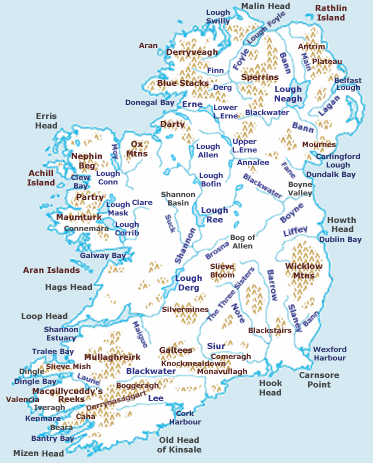
Some of the larger or better-known rivers of Ireland are shown on this map (large version).

The longest river in Ireland is the River Shannon, at 360.5 kilometres (224.0 mi). The river develops into three lakes along its course, Lough Allen, Lough Ree and Lough Derg. Of these, Lough Derg is the largest. The Shannon enters the Atlantic Ocean at the Shannon Estuary. Other major rivers include the River Liffey, River Lee, River Swilly, River Foyle, River Lagan, River Erne, River Blackwater, River Nore, River Suir, River Barrow (The Three Sisters), River Bann, River Slaney, River Boyne, River Moy and River Corrib.

== Longest Irish Rivers (with Basin areas) ==
Lengths obtained from the Ordnance Survey of Ireland: Rivers and their Catchment Basins 1958 (Table of Reference), and for the rivers Bann and Erne – Notes on River Basins by Robert A. Williams

	River	Counties	Length	Basin Area
1	River Shannon (including estuary and flow through lakes)^{a}	Cavan, Leitrim, Roscommon, Longford, Westmeath, Galway, Offaly, Tipperary, Clare, Limerick, Kerry	360 km (224 mi)	16,800 km^{2}
2	River Barrow^{b}	Laois, Kildare, Kilkenny, Carlow, Wexford, Waterford	192 km (119 mi)	3,067 km^{2}
3	River Suir^{b}	Tipperary, Waterford, Kilkenny, Wexford	184 km (114.5 mi)	3,610 km^{2}
4	River Blackwater (Munster)	Kerry, Cork, Waterford	168 km (104.5 mi)	3,324 km^{2}
5	River Bann (including flow through L. Neagh)^{c}	Down, Armagh, Antrim, Londonderry	159 km (99 mi)	5,808 km^{2}
6	River Nore^{b}	Tipperary, Laois, Kilkenny	140 km (87 mi)	2,530 km^{2}
7	River Suck (Shannon)	Roscommon, Galway	133 km (83 mi)	1,600 km^{2}
8	River Liffey	Wicklow, Kildare, Dublin	132 km (82 mi)	1,256 km^{2}
9	River Erne	Cavan, Fermanagh, Donegal	129 km (80 mi)	4,372 km^{2}
10	River Foyle (including Rivers Mourne, Strule & Camowen)	Tyrone, Londonderry, Donegal	129 km (80 mi)	2,925 km^{2}
11	River Slaney	Wicklow, Carlow, Wexford	117 km (73 mi)	1,762 km^{2}
12	River Boyne	Kildare, Offaly, Meath, Louth	113 km (70 mi)	2,695 km^{2}
13	River Moy	Sligo, Mayo	101 km (62.5 mi)	2,086 km^{2}
14	River Clare (Corrib)^{d}	Mayo, Roscommon, Galway	93 km (58 mi)	1,108 km^{2}
15	River Blackwater (Ulster) (Bann) ^{c}	Tyrone, Monaghan, Armagh	92 km (57 mi)	1,507 km^{2}
16t	River Inny (Shannon)	Cavan, Longford, Westmeath	89 km (55.5 mi)	1,254 km^{2}
16t	River Lee	Cork	89 km (55.5 mi)	1,253 km^{2}
18	River Lagan	Down, Antrim	86 km (53.5 mi)	565 km^{2}
19	River Brosna (Shannon)	Westmeath, Offaly	79 km (49 mi)	1,248 km^{2}
20	River Laune (includes Lough Leane and River Flesk)	Kerry	76 km (47.25 mi)	829 km^{2}
21	River Feale (Shannon)	Cork, Limerick, Kerry	74 km (46 mi)	1,170 km^{2}
22	River Bandon	Cork	72 km (45 mi)	608 km^{2}
23	River Blackwater (Boyne)	Cavan, Meath	68 km (42.5 mi)	733 km^{2}
24	River Annalee (Erne)	Monaghan, Cavan	66.8 km (41.75 mi)	522 km^{2}
25	River Bride (M. Blackwater)	Cork, Waterford	64 km (40 mi)	419 km^{2}
26	Boyle River (including Lung River) (Shannon)	Mayo, Sligo, Roscommon	64 km (40 mi)	725 km^{2}
27	River Deel (Shannon)	Cork, Limerick	63.2 km (39.5 mi)	481 km^{2}
28	River Robe (Corrib)^{d}	Mayo	62.8 km (39.25 mi)	320 km^{2}
29	River Finn (County Donegal) (Foyle)	Donegal, Tyrone	62.8 km (39.25 mi)	505 km^{2}
30	River Maigue (Shannon)	Cork, Limerick	62 km (38.75 mi)	1,000 km^{2}
31	Fane River	Monaghan, Armagh, Louth	61.2 km (38.25 mi)	350 km^{2}
32	Ballisodare River	Sligo	60.8 km (38 mi)	650 km^{2}
33	River Dee (Louth)	Cavan, Meath, Louth	60.4 km (37.75 mi)	392 km^{2}
34	River Fergus (Shannon)	Clare	58.4 km (36.5 mi)	1,043 km^{2}
35	Little Brosna River (Shannon)	Offaly, Tipperary	57.6 km (36 mi)	662 km^{2}
36	Mulkear River (including Bilboa River) (Shannon)	Tipperary, Limerick	55.9 km (34.75 mi)	650 km^{2}
37	River Glyde (Co. Louth)	Cavan, Meath, Louth	55.9 km (34.75 mi)	348 km^{2}

TABLE 1

a

- The length of the River Shannon from the Shannon Pot to Limerick City is 258 kilometres (160 mi) with a basin area of 11,700 km^{2}.
- The River Shannon's overall length (to Loop Head), using the Owenmore River (County Cavan) as source, is 372 kilometres (231 mi), 11 km (7 mi) longer than the Shannon Pot source.
- The River Shannon's overall length (to Loop Head), using the Boyle River's furthest source, is 392.1 kilometres (243.6 mi), making the Boyle-Shannon river the longest natural stream flow (source to sea) in Ireland, 31.6 km (19.5 mi) longer than the Shannon Pot source.
- The River Shannon is a traditional freshwater river for just about 45% of its total length. Excluding the 102.2-kilometre (63.5 mi) tidal estuary from its total length of 360 kilometres (224 mi), if one also excludes the lakes (L. Derg 39 kilometres (24 mi), L. Ree 29 kilometres (18 mi), L. Allen 11 kilometres (7 mi) plus L. Boderg, L. Bofin, L. Forbes, L. Corry) from the Shannon's freshwater flow of 258.3 kilometres (160.5 mi), the Shannon as a freshwater river is only about 160 kilometres (100 mi) long.

b

- The total basin area of the Three Sisters (Barrow, Nore and Suir) is 9,207 km^{2}.

c

- The traditional length given for the River Bann is 80 miles (129 km) which is the combined total length of Upper and Lower Bann rivers and doesn't include Lough Neagh.
- The total length of the Ulster Blackwater from its source to the sea via L. Neagh and the Lower Bann is 186.3 km (115.75 mi), surpassed, in Ireland, only by the Shannon and Barrow rivers. This is the longest stream flow (source to sea) in Ulster.

d

- The total basin area of the 6 km River Corrib is 3,138 km^{2}
- The total length of the River Robe's journey from its source near Ballyhaunis to Galway Bay (via Lough Mask, Cong canal and river, Lough Corrib and River Corrib) is 72 miles (116 km). This is the longest stream flow (source to sea) within the Corrib Basin.

== Largest Irish Rivers (by flow) ==
	River (River Basin)	Mean Discharge (m^{3}/s)
1	River Shannon^{a}	209 (300)
2	River Corrib	105.5
3	River Bann^{b}	92 (102.5)
4	River Foyle	90
5	River Blackwater (Munster)	87.5
6	River Erne	85
7	River Suir^{c}	76
8	River Moy	63
9	River Barrow^{c}	46.5
10	River Laune	43
11	River Nore^{c}	42
12	River Lee	40
13	River Slaney	39
14	River Boyne	38.5
15	River Cong (Corrib)	37.6
16	River Feale (Shannon)	34.6
17	River Fergus (Shannon)	25.7
18	River Clare (Corrib)	22.9
19	River Suck (Shannon)	22.2
20	River Avoca	22
21	River Bandon	21.5
22	River Mourne (Foyle)	21.1
23	River Blackwater (Ulster) (Bann)	19.7
24	River Ballisodare	18.25
25	River Inny (Shannon)	18.4
26	River Liffey	17
27	River Derg (Foyle)	16.2
28	River Maigue (Shannon)	15.6
29	River Main (Bann)	15.4
30	River Blackwater (Boyne) (Boyne)	15.08
31	Aille River (Connacht) (Corrib)	15.0
32	Owenmore River (County Mayo)	14.7
33	Boyle River (Shannon)	13.57
34	River Deel (Shannon)	12.56
35	Mulkear River (Shannon)	12.55

TABLE 2

^{a} The River Shannon's 209 m^{3}/s is to Limerick City (Catchment area: 11,700 km^{2}). If the discharges from all of the rivers and streams into the Shannon Estuary (including the rivers Feale 34.6m^{3}/s, Maigue 15.6m^{3}/s, Fergus 25.7m^{3}/s, and Deel 7.4m^{3}/s) are added to the discharge at Limerick giving a total catchment of 16,865 km^{2}, the total discharge of the River Shannon at its mouth at Loop Head reaches 300 m^{3}/s

^{b} The River Bann's 92 m^{3}/s is to Movanagher Gauging station (Basin area 5209.8 km^{2}). The 102.5 m^{3}/s is based on the total basin area of 5808 km^{2} .

^{c} The Three Sisters (Barrow, Nore & Suir) total flow into Waterford Harbour is 154 m^{3}/s and the combined flow of the Barrow and Nore rivers is 86 m^{3}/s before joining the river Suir near Waterford City.

== Rivers in Ulster ==
With length in miles (and km)

- River Crana 12 miles (19 km)
- River Lennon (Leannan) 28.5 miles (45.9 km)
- River Foyle 80 miles (130 km) (total) – that portion named "Foyle" forms the border between the Republic of Ireland and Northern Ireland
  - Burn Dale (also known as the River Deele) – rises in and flows through the east of County Donegal – 25.5 miles (41.0 km)
  - River Finn (Foyle tributary) – rises and flows mainly through County Donegal, Republic of Ireland 39.25 miles (63.17 km)
    - River Reelan 10.5 miles (16.9 km)
  - River Mourne
    - River Derg 28 miles (45 km)
    - Mournebeg River 17.25 miles (27.76 km)
    - Owenkillew River 30 miles (48 km)
    - Glenelly River 22 miles (35 km)
    - Owenreagh River 14 miles (23 km)
    - River Strule 14.25 miles (22.93 km)
      - Camowen River 28 miles (45 km)
      - Drumragh River 20.5 miles (33.0 km)
    - Fairy Water 17.75 miles (28.57 km)
    - Drumquin River 9.5 miles (15.3 km)
    - Routing Burn 13 miles (21 km)
    - Owenreagh River 16.5 miles (26.6 km)
    - Cloghfin River 14 miles (23 km)
  - Glenmornan River
- River Faughan 29.5 miles (47.5 km)
- River Roe 34.25 miles (55.12 km)
- River Bann 90 miles (140 km)
  - River Blackwater 56.7 miles (91.2 km)
    - River Callan 26.5 miles (42.6 km)
    - Oona Water 17.75 miles (28.57 km)
    - River Torrent 25 miles (40 km)
    - River Tall 22.5 miles (36.2 km)
    - River Blackwater (Northern) 35.5 miles (57.1 km)
  - River Main 34 miles (55 km)
  - Six Mile Water 21 miles (34 km)
  - Ballinderry River 29 miles (47 km)
  - Moyola River 31 miles (50 km)
  - Clady River
  - Knockoneil River
  - Grillagh River
  - Agivey River
  - Cusher River 25 miles (40 km)
  - Clady River
    - Altmore River
    - Cromore Burn
    - Devlin River
      - Cronaniv Burn
- River Dun
- River Bush 33.5 miles (53.9 km)
- River Erne 80 miles (130 km) (See Atlantic rivers)
- River Lagan 53.5 miles (86.1 km)
  - River Farset
  - Blackstaff River
- River Quoile 27.5 miles (44.3 km)
- Clanrye (Newry) River 27 miles (43 km)

== Rivers in the Republic of Ireland, flowing into the Irish Sea ==
With length in miles (and km)

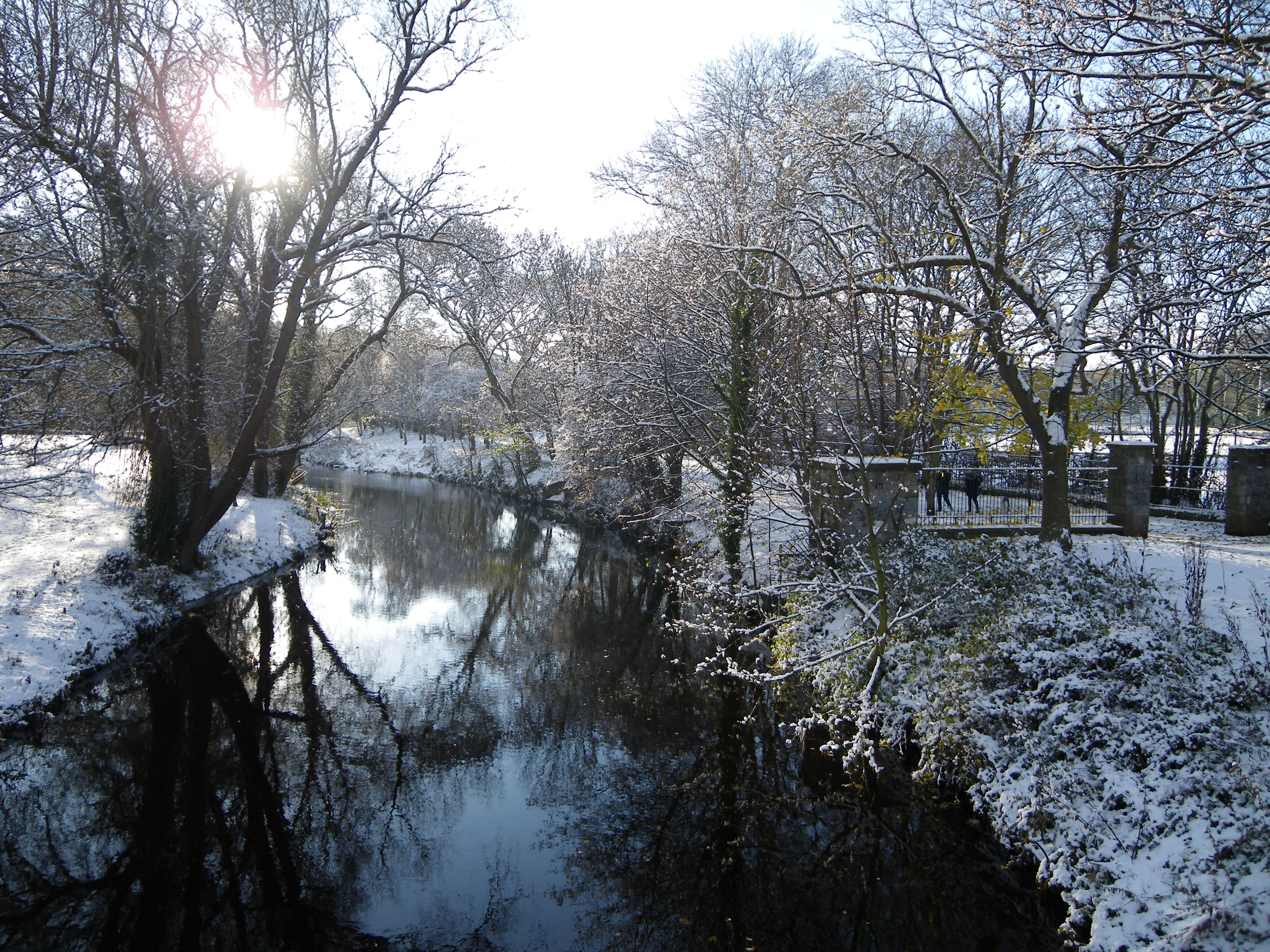
River Dodder

- Castletown River 28 miles (45 km)
  - Cully Water 14.5 miles (23.3 km)
  - Kilcurry River 11.5 miles (18.5 km)
- River Fane 38.25 miles (61.56 km)
- River Glyde 34.75 miles (55.92 km)
- River Dee, County Louth 37.75 miles (60.75 km)
- River Boyne 70 miles (110 km)
  - River Owenroe (Moynalty) 23.5 miles (37.8 km)
  - River Blackwater, Kildare and Meath 20 miles (32 km)
  - River Blackwater, Cavan and Meath 42.5 miles (68.4 km)
  - Moynalty River 23.5 miles (37.8 km)
  - Athboy River 22.5 miles (36.2 km)
  - River Turry 3.2 miles (5 km)
  - Stonestown River 20 miles (32 km)
  - Dale River 22.5 miles (36.2 km)
  - Kinnegad River 19.5 miles (31.4 km)
  - Yellow River 16 miles (26 km)
- River Nanny 17 miles (28 km)
- River Tolka 20.75 miles (33.39 km)
- River Liffey 82 miles (132 km)
  - Kings River 16.5 miles (26.6 km)
  - Morell River 7 miles (11 km)
  - River Rye 15.5 miles (24.9 km)
    - Lyreen River
  - River Camac
  - River Poddle
  - River Dodder 17 miles (27 km)
    - Owendoher River
- River Dargle 12.5 miles (20.1 km)
- River Vartry 20.5 miles (33.0 km)
- River Avoca (Ovoca) 9.5 miles (15.3 km)
  - River Avonmore 22.75 miles (36.61 km)
  - River Avonbeg 16.5 miles (26.6 km)
  - Aughrim River 5.75 miles (9.25 km)
- River Slaney 73 miles (117 km)
  - Derreen River 25 miles (40 km)
  - River Derry 21 miles (34 km)
  - River Bann (Wexford) 26 miles (42 km)

== Rivers in the Republic of Ireland, flowing into the Celtic Sea ==
With length in miles (and km)

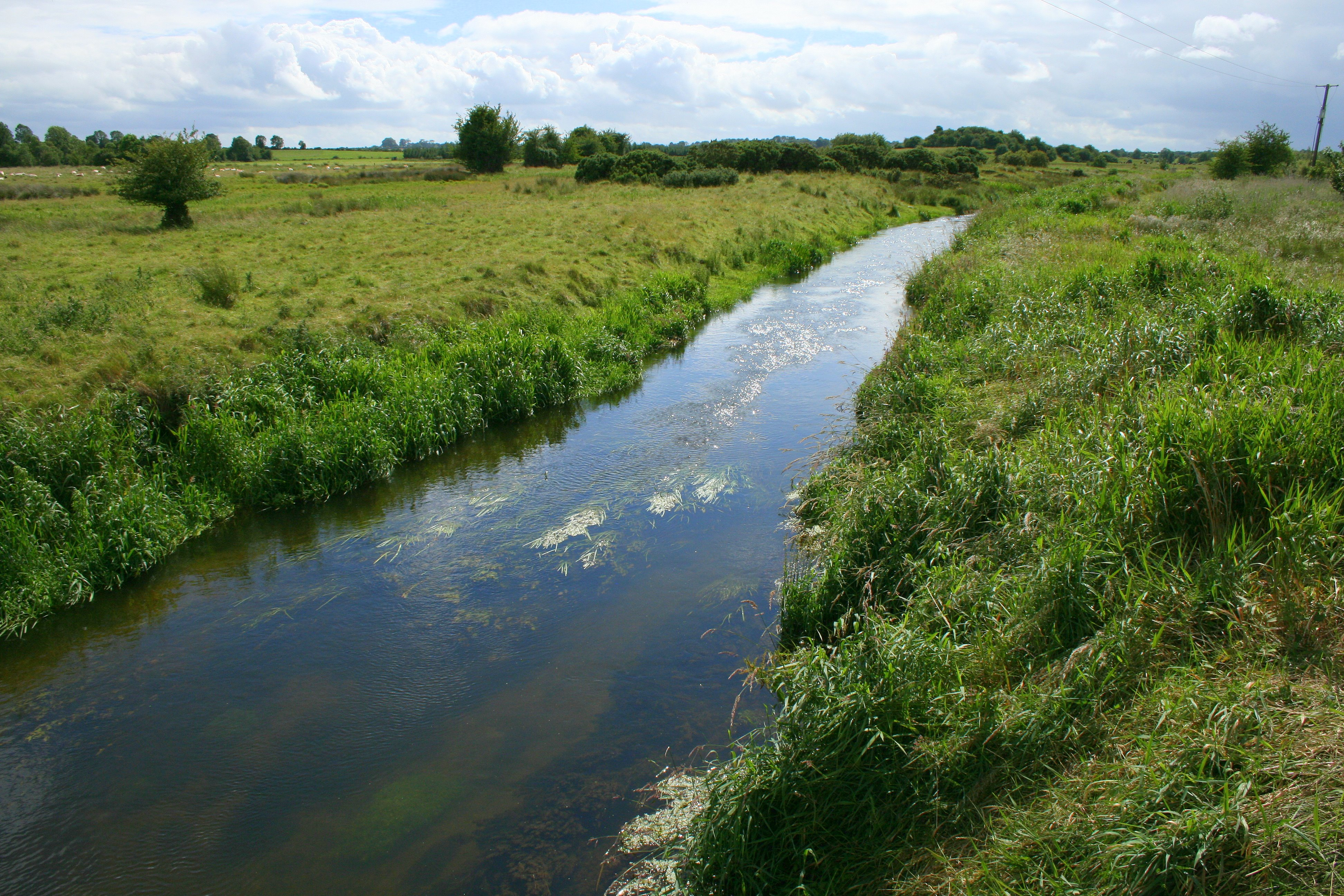
River Goul

River Lee

- River Barrow 119.5 miles (192.3 km)
    - Philipstown River 15.75 miles (25.35 km)
    - Figile River 20.75 miles (33.39 km)
    - River Slate 17 miles (27 km)
    - River Triogue 16.75 miles (26.96 km)
    - Finnery River
      - Tully Stream 8 miles (13 km)
    - River Greese 22 miles (35 km)
    - Burren River 24 miles (39 km)
  - River Nore 87.75 miles (141.22 km)
    - River Erkina 22.5 miles (36.2 km)
      - River Goul 23.25 miles (37.42 km)
    - River Dinan 24.75 miles (39.83 km)
    - Kings River 28.75 miles (46.27 km)
  - River Suir 114.75 miles (184.67 km)
    - River Drish 19.75 miles (31.78 km)
    - River Clodiagh 20.5 miles (33.0 km)
    - Aherlow River 27 miles (43 km)
    - River Ara 18.25 miles (29.37 km)
    - River Anner 23.5 miles (37.8 km)
    - John's River
    - River Tar 18.75 miles (30.18 km)
      - River Duag
- River Colligan 15 miles (24 km)
- River Mahon 15.75 miles (25.35 km)
- River Blackwater, Cork 104.5 miles (168.2 km)
  - River Owentaraglen 17.25 miles (27.76 km)
  - River Allow 22.75 miles (36.61 km)
  - River Funshion 34.75 miles (55.92 km)
  - River Finisk 17.5 miles (28.2 km)
  - River Awbeg 31.75 miles (51.10 km)
  - River Dalua 15.5 miles (24.9 km)
  - River Bride 40 miles (64 km)
- River Womanagh 19 miles (31 km)
- Owenacurra River 13.25 miles (21.32 km)
- Glashaboy River 15 miles (24 km)
- River Lee 55.5 miles (89.3 km)
  - River Sullane 22.5 miles (36.2 km)
  - Shournagh River 17 miles (27 km)
  - River Bride 21 miles (34 km)
- River Bandon 45 miles (72 km)
- River Ilen 20.75 miles (33.39 km)
- Argideen River 17.75 miles (28.57 km)
- River Owenabue 20.5 miles (33.0 km)

== Rivers in the Republic of Ireland, flowing into the Atlantic Ocean ==
With length in miles (and km)

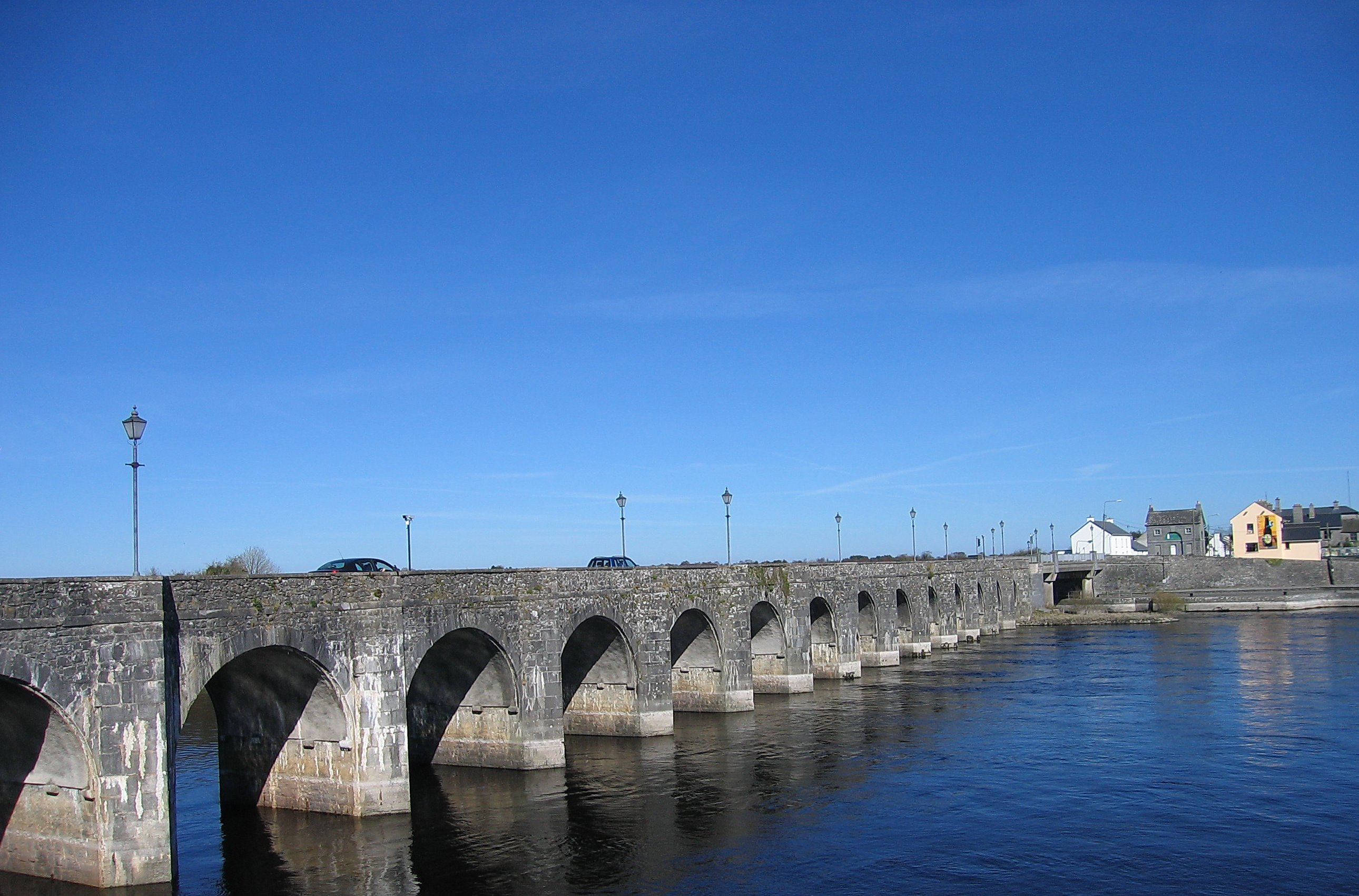
River Shannon

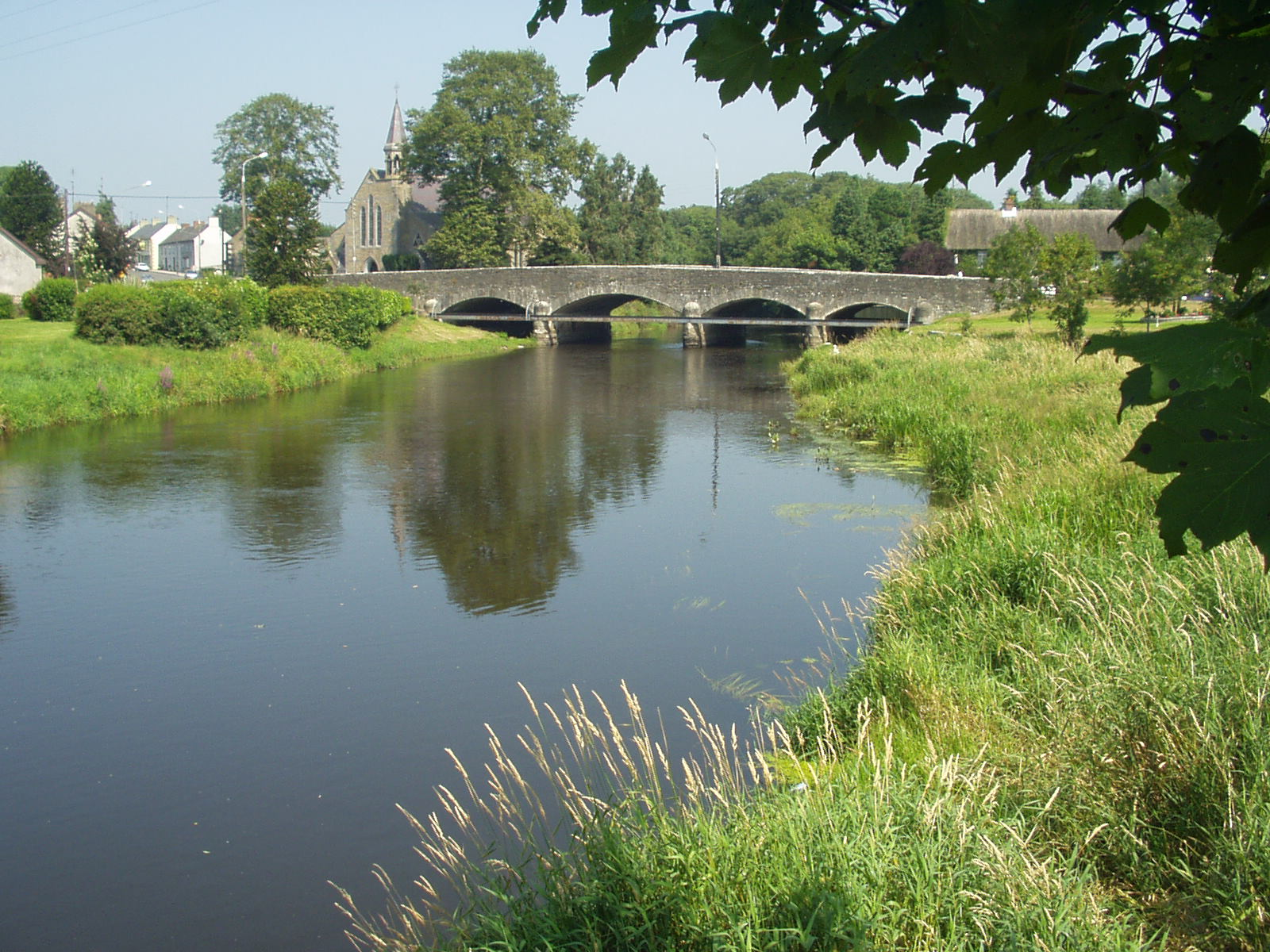
River Annalee

- Roughty River 16.75 miles (26.96 km) (flowing into Kenmare Bay) at Kenmare
- River Laune 14 miles (23 km)
  - River Flesk 28.25 miles (45.46 km)
  - Gweestin River 13.75 miles (22.13 km)
- Caragh River 14 miles (23 km)
- River Inny (Kerry) 16.5 miles (26.6 km)
- Cummeragh River 9.5 miles (15.3 km)
- River Ferta
- River Carrowbeg
- River Maine 26.5 miles (42.6 km)
  - Brown Flesk 19.75 miles (31.78 km)
- River Feale 46 miles (74 km)
  - River Galey 27 miles (43 km)
  - Allaghaun River 13.75 miles (22.13 km)
  - Smerlagh (Smaorlagh) River 15.5 miles (24.9 km)
  - Shanow River 15.25 miles (24.54 km)
- River Shannon 224 miles (360 km)
  - Owenmore River (County Cavan) 9 miles (14 km)
  - Arigna River 14 miles (23 km)
  - Feorish River 19.5 miles (31.4 km)
  - River Brosna 49.25 miles (79.26 km)
    - Clodiagh River 24.25 miles (39.03 km)
    - Tullamore River 12.5 miles (20.1 km)
    - Silver River 24 miles (39 km)
  - Bunowen River 16 miles (26 km)
  - Little Brosna River 36 miles (58 km)
    - River Camcor 16.25 miles (26.15 km)
  - Ballyfinboy River 20.75 miles (33.39 km)
  - Nenagh River 28.5 miles (45.9 km)
    - Ollatrim River 18.5 miles (29.8 km)
  - River Inny 55.5 miles (89.3 km)
    - River Tang 15.5 miles (24.9 km)
  - River Suck 82.5 miles (132.8 km)
    - River Shiven 21.25 miles (34.20 km)
  - Boyle River (Total) 40 miles (64 km)
  - Boyle River 13.75 miles (22.13 km)
    - Lung River 17.75 miles (28.57 km)
    - Breedoge River 11.75 miles (18.91 km)
  - Camlin River 27 miles (43 km)
  - Mulkear River 15.25 miles (24.54 km)
    - Bilboa River 19.5 miles (31.4 km)
  - River Deel 39.5 miles (63.6 km)
  - River Maigue 38.75 miles (62.36 km)
- River Fergus 36.5 miles (58.7 km)
- River Corrib 5.75 miles (9.25 km)
  - Cregg River (via Lough Corrib)
  - River Clare (via Lough Corrib) 57.75 miles (92.94 km)
    - Grange River 17 miles (27 km)
    - Abbert River 25.25 miles (40.64 km)
  - River Black 17.75 miles (28.57 km)
  - Aille River (Connacht) 18.5 miles (29.8 km)
  - Baelanabrack River 11 miles (18 km)
  - River Robe (via Loughs Mask and Corrib) 39.25 miles (63.17 km)
- River Clarin 19.75 miles (31.78 km)
  - Clady River
    - Cromore Burn
      - Cronaniv Burn
- Kilcolgan River 9.5 miles (15.3 km)
  - Dooyertha River 23.75 miles (38.22 km)
- Kinvarra River
- River Doonbeg 25.75 miles (41.44 km)
- River Inagh 22.75 miles (36.61 km)
- Carrowbeg River 10 miles (16 km)
- Bunowen River 13.25 miles (21.32 km)
- River Erriff 20.5 miles (33.0 km)
- Owenglin River 11.5 miles (18.5 km)
- Ballynahinch River 18.5 miles (29.8 km)
- Cashla River 13.25 miles (21.32 km)
- Owenboliska River 13.25 miles (21.32 km)
- Glenamoy River 13.75 miles (22.13 km)
- Cloonaghmore River 19.75 miles (31.78 km)
- Owenmore River (County Mayo) (incl. Carrowmore Lake) 29.25 miles (47.07 km)
- Owenduff River 17.75 miles (28.57 km)
- Newport River 18.25 miles (29.37 km)
- River Moy 62.5 miles (100.6 km)
  - Deel River 28 miles (45 km)
  - Manulla River 19 miles (31 km)
  - Gweestion River 23 miles (37 km)
  - Owengarve River 16 miles (26 km)
  - River Glore 17 miles (27 km)
- Easky River, County Sligo 18.5 miles (29.8 km)
- Ballisodare River 5.5 miles (8.9 km)
  - Owenmore River (County Sligo) 32.5 miles (52.3 km)
  - Owenbeg River 14.75 miles (23.74 km)
  - Unshin River 14.25 miles (22.93 km)
- River Garavogue (including L. Gill and Bonet River) 31.5 miles (50.7 km)
- River Erne 80 miles (130 km) – mainly formed by Upper and Lower Lough Erne in County Fermanagh, Northern Ireland
  - River Annalee 41.75 miles (67.19 km)
  - River Cladagh (including Arney) 22 miles (35 km)
  - Sillees River 33 miles (53 km)
  - River Ballinamallard 16 miles (26 km)
  - River Swanlinbar 18 miles (29 km)
  - River Woodford 18.5 miles (29.8 km)
  - Dromore River 23.25 miles (37.42 km)
  - Yellow River 17.25 miles (27.76 km)
  - Colebrooke River 35 miles (56 km)
  - Finn River (County Fermanagh and County Monaghan) 31.5 miles (50.7 km)
- Owenea River 16.25 miles (26.15 km)
- Oily River 13 miles (21 km)
- Bungosteen River 15.5 miles (24.9 km)
- Ballintra River 14 miles (23 km)
- River Eske 15.25 miles (24.54 km)
  - Drumenny Burn
- River Gweebarra 19.75 miles (31.78 km)
- River Swilly 25.5 miles (41.0 km)

== See also ==
- List of rivers of Ireland
- List of canals in Ireland
- List of loughs of Ireland
- List of rivers of County Dublin
- Geography of Ireland
- Transport in Ireland
