= Abbert River =

Watercourse in County Galway, Ireland, tributary of the Clare

Coordinates: 53.403750°N 8.656972°W

- Native name: Abhainn na hAbarta (Irish)

Location
- Country: Ireland

Physical characteristics
- Source
  - location: Gortnahultra, County Galway
- Mouth
  - location: Galway Bay via River Clare, Lough Corrib, River Corrib
- Length: 40.64 kilometres (25.25 mi)

The Abbert River (Irish: Abhainn na hAbarta) is a river in County Galway, Ireland, a tributary of the River Clare.

== Course ==
The Abbert River rises in the Killaclogher Bog Natural Heritage Area. It flows westwards under the N63 (passing Abbeyknockmoy) and R347, then drains into the River Clare at Anbally.

== Wildlife ==
The Abbert River is a trout fishery.

== See also ==
- Rivers of Ireland
