= Corrib =

Corrib has multiple meanings. Among the possible ones are:

- Lough Corrib, a lake in the west of Ireland, north of Galway.
- River Corrib, a river connecting Lough Corrib to Galway Bay through the city of Galway.
- Corrib gas field, a natural gas reservoir in the Atlantic, about 80 km off County Mayo on the west coast of Ireland
