= Drish =

Drish may refer to:

- River Drish, in Ireland
- John Drish (1920–1977), American basketball and baseball player

== See also ==
- Dr. John R. Drish House, a historic mansion in Tuscaloosa, Alabama
