= Johnny Duffy =

Irish Gaelic footballer

Personal information
- Nickname: Jockey
- Born: Killawalla, County Mayo

Sport
- Sport: Gaelic football
- Position: Forward
Club
- Years: Club
- Ballintubber
Club titles
	Football	Hurling
Mayo titles	3	
Connacht titles	0	
Inter-county titles
- Connacht titles: 0
- All-Irelands: 0
- NFL: 0
- All Stars: 0

Johnny Duffy (born in Killawalla, County Mayo, Ireland) plays club football for Ballintubber. He came on as a substitute against Crossmolina in the Mayo County Senior Semi Finals 2012 in McHale park and won the game for Ballintubber with a superbly taken goal, and all-around great individual performance.
