= Knockferry =

Townland in County Galway, Ireland

Knockferry Caladh an Chnuic
- Townland
- Location in Ireland
- Coordinates: 53°24′50″N 9°09′11″W
- Country: Ireland
- Province: Connacht
- County: County Galway
- Elevation: 86 m (282 ft)
- Irish Grid Reference: M198329

Knockferry (Irish: Caladh an Chnoic) is a townland in County Galway, on the shores (at the narrowest part) of Lough Corrib. The number of occupied dwellings is 20 (including Burnthouse) and for census purposes it is incorporated within the 'census town' of Rosscahill, Wormhole with a total population of 295 in 2011.

== Historical record ==
In the Royal Commission on Congestion in Ireland (1908), the townland is mentioned as part of a submission proposing the construction of a bridge across the Corrib, to replace the existing ferry service. Such a proposal had first been mooted by Archbishop John MacHale of Tuam, during a visit of 1868. and raised subsequently in 1897 as a suggestion for relief work for farmers suffering from a failure of the potato crop.
