= Aille River =

Aille River may refer to two Irish rivers:

- Aille River (County Clare)
- Aille River (County Mayo)
