= Flush River =

Belfast river

The Flush River is a small stream in Belfast, Northern Ireland, that originates in the hills to the north-west of the city out towards Antrim. It flows into the city and can be seen at the 'Flush Bend' area of the Springfield Road, near Watermouth Crescent, before running in a mainly eastern direction past Elswick Street and behind the former Mackies factory. At its point closest to the Springfield Road, the River Farset is a little below (north) of the Flush, which is on the left-hand side of that thoroughfare leaving the city.

Flush river, Springfield Road, Belfast

The bodies of two people murdered during the Northern Ireland Troubles were found near the river in the Springfield Road area.
