= Aille River (County Mayo) =

River in County Mayo, Ireland

- The river in 2026

- Aille River
- Etymology: Irish for "cliff river"
- Native name: Abhainn na hAille (Irish)

Physical characteristics
- Source
  - location: Glenmask, Partry Mountains, County Mayo
- Mouth
  - location: Galway Bay via Lough Mask, Lough Corrib and River Corrib
  - coordinates: 53.776657°N 9.372744°W
- Length: 29.8 kilometres (18.5 mi)
- Discharge
  - average: 15 m^{3}/s (530 cu ft/s)

The Aille River (Irish: Abhainn na hAille) is a river in County Mayo, Ireland, flowing from the Partry Mountains to Lough Mask, and flows underground for part of its course.

== Course ==
The Aille River rises in the Partry Mountains 16 km (10 mi) south of Westport, drains the northwest part of the Partry range and sinks underground at the Aille Caves. It continues as a subterranean river for 4 km (2.5 mi), resurging at Pollatoomary. It flows south to Cloon Lough, which feeds into Lough Mask.

== See also ==
- Aille River (County Clare)
- Rivers of Ireland
