= River Owenroe =

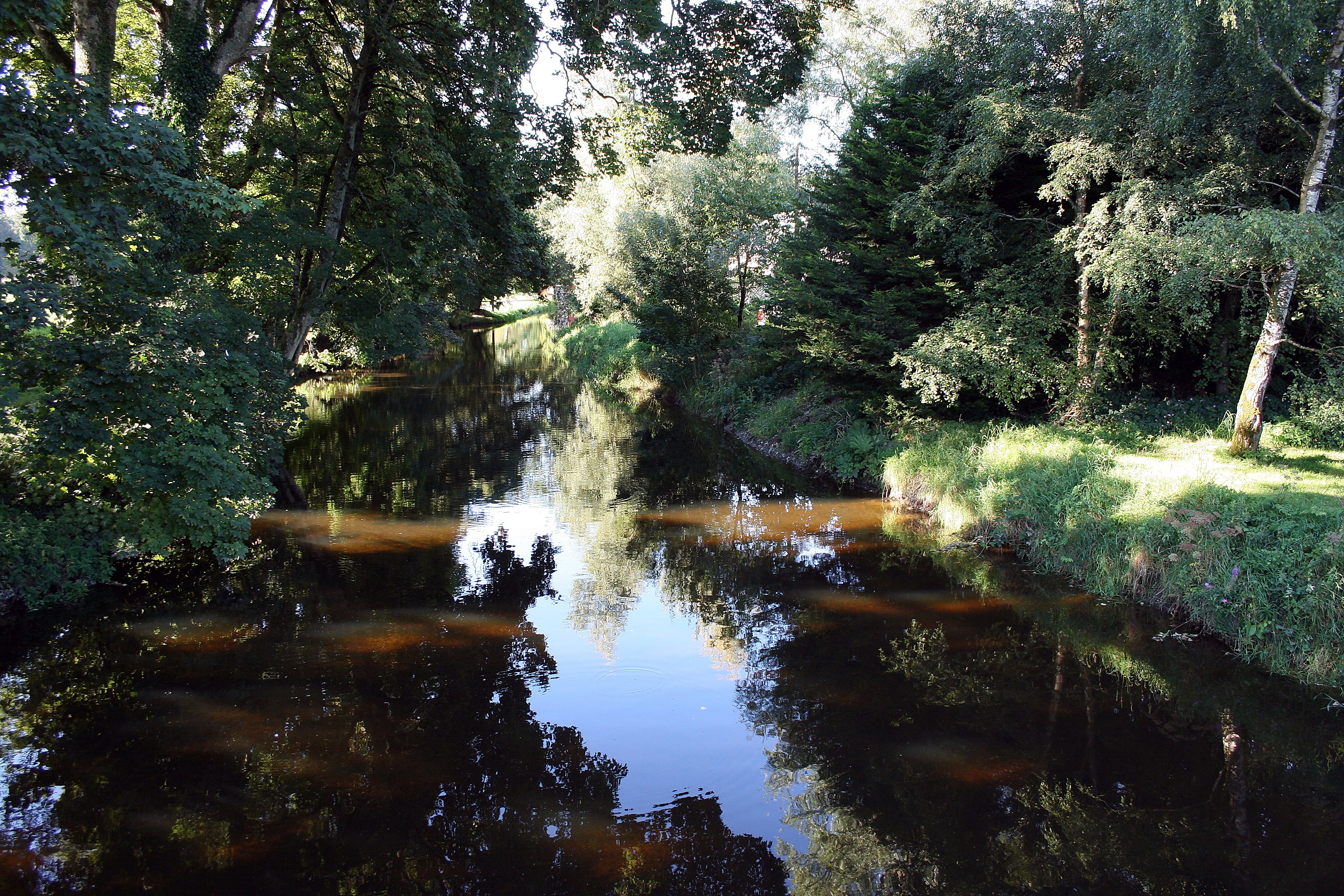
- Owenroe (Red River) at Moynalty, County Meath
- Native name: An Abhainn Rua (Irish)

Physical characteristics
- Source
  - location: Loughanleagh, County Cavan
- Mouth
  - location: Irish Sea at Drogheda as the Boyne

The Owenroe River or Moynalty River or Borora River (Irish: An Abhainn Rua, meaning 'red river') rises near Bailieborough, County Cavan, Ireland, on the slopes of the Loughanleagh mountain. It flows southeast and forms the boundary between Cavan and County Meath for five to 6 miles, flowing through the village of Moynalty. It joins the River Blackwater at Oristown, east of Kells. The Blackwater joins the Boyne at Navan before discharging into the Irish Sea at Drogheda.

== See also ==
Rivers of Ireland
