= Killawalla =

Killawalla Coill an Bhaile Killavally
- Village
- Location in Ireland
- Coordinates: 53°45′30″N 9°21′59″W
- Country: Ireland
- Province: Connacht
- County: County Mayo
- Elevation: 49 m (161 ft)

Population (2011)
  - Total: 460
- Irish Grid Reference: M098795

Killawalla or Killavally (Irish: Coill an Bhaile, meaning 'wood of the homestead') is a village located in County Mayo, Ireland, seven miles (11 km) from Westport on the R330 road to Ballinrobe. Saint Patrick is alleged to have passed this way en route to Croagh Patrick, and accordingly the local Catholic church is named after him. The village also contains a primary school and MacEvilly's pub established in 1968. The village post office closed in 2017. Killawalla is part of the parish of Carnacon and Ballintubber. Research carried out by NUI Maynooth showed Killawalla to have sustained the biggest population loss of any village in Ireland during the Great Famine. Between 1841 and 1851, the village lost two thirds of its population. The 1916 rising participant and sport administrator Seán O'Duffy who was heavily involved in the development of camogie in Ireland for 40 years, was born in the old barracks in Killawalla in 1886 according to a plaque erected on the wall of the school. This RIC barracks located in Kinury was one of those closed in the wake of the Tourmakeady ambush during the Irish War of Independence in May 1921.

Killawalla is also home to Pollatoomary cave, the deepest explored underwater cave in Britain and Ireland. The cave has been explored to a depth of 113 m in June 2018 by Michal Marek. This dive surpassed the previous record of 108 m also set here by Artur Kozłowski in 2008. The entrance to the cave is located in the townland of Ballyburke on private land.
