= River Duag =

River in County Tipperary, Ireland

Coordinates: 52°17′N 7°59′W

The River Duag is a river in County Tipperary, Ireland. It flows into the River Tar between Clogheen and Ballyporeen. The Tar in turn is a tributary of the River Suir.

== See also ==
- Rivers of Ireland
