= Pollatoomary =

Flooded cave in Ireland

Coordinates: 53.776695°N 9.372953°W

Pollatoomary is the deepest explored underwater cave in Ireland. It has been explored to an underwater depth of 120 metres (390 ft). The explored limit of Pollatoomary is also 33 metres (108 ft) deeper underwater than that of the terminal sump in Wookey Hole Caves in Somerset, England, which previously held the record for the deepest underwater cave in Great Britain and Ireland.

== Location ==
The cave is located in the Partry Mountains in the townland of Bellaburke near Killavally, Westport, County Mayo, where the Aille River reemerges, having gone underground at Aille caves some 4 kilometres (2.5 mi) away. The cave entrance is on privately owned farmland.

== Exploration ==
J. C. Coleman's 1965 compendium, The Caves of Ireland, states: "Pollatoomary Rising ... thought to be the rising of the Aille water. The water rises through fissures in the limestone."

The cave was first explored in 1978 by cave diver Martyn Farr, who dived it to a depth of 33 metres (108 ft). At the time, this made it the deepest known sump in Ireland, and by 1985 it still held second place.

30 years after Farr's first exploration, one of his students, Artur Kozłowski, began to concentrate his efforts on the cave. In May 2008 Kozłowski explored Pollatoomary to an underwater depth of 86 metres (282 ft), then on 5–6 July 2008, he reached 103 metres (338 ft) underwater. This made it the deepest sump in Ireland by far, and additionally it surpassed the British cave diving depth record.

Pollatoomary was entered again on 9 June 2018 by Michał Marek, who explored the cave to 113 metres (371 ft) underwater.

On the 6th of April 2025 Jim Warny managed to explore past the previous limit of exploration penetrating 100m further into the cave and reaching a maximum depth of 120m.
