= River Farset =

River in Belfast, Northern Ireland

Coordinates: 54.625°N 5.981°W

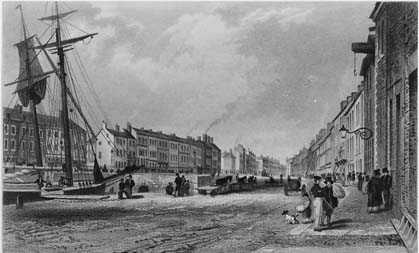
The river on High Street, c. 1830

The River Farset (An Fhearsaid or Abhainn na Feirste in Irish) is a river in Belfast, Northern Ireland. It is a late tributary of the River Lagan.

== Course ==
Rising on Squire's Hill on the north-western edge of Belfast, the River Farset is on the County Antrim side of the Lagan. Neear the Springfield Road, it comes relatively close to the Flush River on the opposite side of that thoroughfare. Its entry to the Lagan is near to that river's outflow into Belfast Lough. The Farset is now contained within a tunnel under Belfast's High Street supposedly big enough to take a bus.

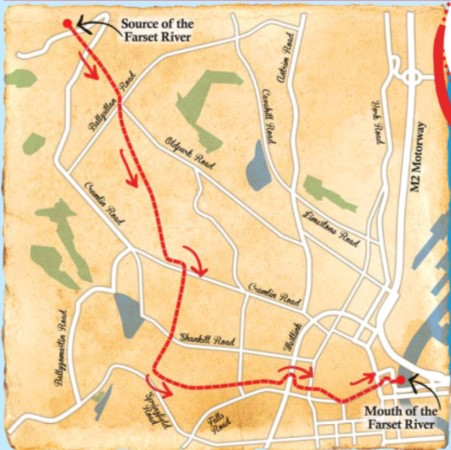
Course of the Farset river.

== History ==
Belfast was founded at a sandy ford across the Farset, and this is the origin of the city's name – Béal Feirste, the 'river mouth of the sandbar'. Farset itself is derived from the Irish word for 'sandbar'. The river flowed beside docks on High Street as Belfast grew in the 19th century.

In the 17th, 18th, and 19th centuries, the river was sometimes known as Belfast River, the River of Belfast, the Town River, or the High Street River. Over the course of the 18th century it was gradually covered over; the final section, close to Princes Street, was culverted in 1804.

== See also ==
- List of rivers of Ireland
