= Michał Marek =

Polish cave diver (1983–2019)

Michal Marek
- Born: 20 January 1983; Krosno, Poland
- Died: 12 May 2019 (aged 36); County Donegal, Ireland
- Known for: Record-breaking cave diver and explorer

Michał Marek (20 January 1983 – 12 May 2019) was a Polish cave diver who spent his last years in Ireland.He held the record for the deepest cave dive in Ireland at a depth of 113 m (371 ft).

== Life and speleological career ==
Marek was born in Krosno, Poland in 1983, and began open-water diving in 2002 in Kraków. Moving to Ireland in 2004, he settled in Galway and subsequently became a qualified technical diver.

In 2010 Marek met cave diver Artur Kozłowski, who introduced him to the idea of cave diving and exploration. Kozłowski, among other achievements, had set the British and Irish cave diving depth record of 103 metres (338 ft) in Pollatoomary, County Mayo, in 2008.

Over subsequent years, Marek developed his caving and cave diving skills, and accomplished much in exploration. In 2012, while on a coastal dive at Ailladie, near Fanore, County Clare, he discovered the entrance to Cliff Cave. With other cave divers, he spent the following months and years exploring the underwater cave to over 2.7 km (1.7 mi) in length, making it the longest marine cave in Ireland.

Marek visited Pollatoomary in 2018, and continued on from Artur Kozłowski's previous limit of exploration. He extended this to 113 metres (371 ft), to set a new Irish cave diving depth record.

In addition to his speleological work, Marek joined the Irish Cave Rescue Organisation in 2014 and became a core team member in 2015.

Marek died on 12 May 2019 at the age of 36, while on an open-water dive on the wreck of the SS Athenia, off Malin Head, County Donegal.
