= River Triogue =

River in Ireland

Coordinates: 53°08′11″N 7°17′32″W

The River Triogue (Irish: An Trióg) is a river that flows through the county of Laois in Ireland. It is a tributary of the River Barrow.

It has its source in the Cullenagh Hills, south of Portlaoise. It enters the town of Portlaoise from the south, passing under Main Street and flows north before joining the River Barrow at Clonterry north east of Mountmellick.

== See also ==
Rivers of Ireland
