= Athboy River =

River in County Meath, Ireland

Coordinates: 53°35′31″N 6°52′56″W

Physical characteristics
- Source
  - location: Athboy, County Meath

The Athboy River (also known as the Yellow Ford River) is a river in Athboy, County Meath, Ireland. The river is a tributary of the River Boyne, meeting it near the town of Trim, County Meath.
