= River Inny (County Kerry) =

River in County Kerry, Ireland

Coordinates: 51°51′N 10°11′W

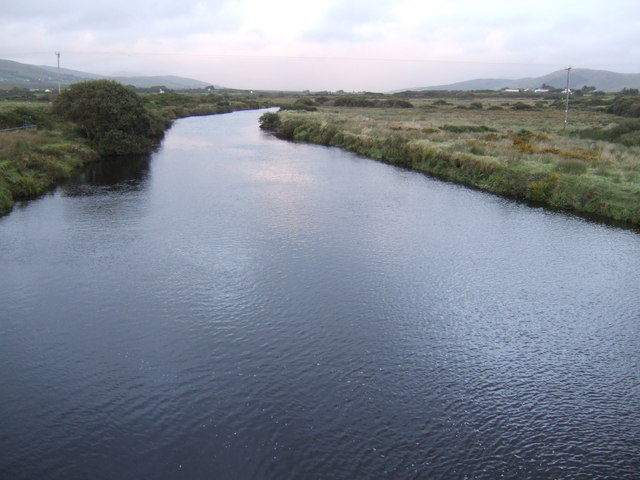
- The Inny River
- Etymology: Irish finn, "clear"
- Native name: Abhainn na hUíne (Irish)

Location
- Country: Ireland

Physical characteristics
- Source
  - location: Knocknagapple, County Kerry
- Mouth
  - location: Atlantic Ocean via Lough Currane
- Length: 26.6 km (16.5 mi)

The River Inny (Irish: Abhainn na hUíne) is a river in County Kerry, Ireland.
