= River Tar =

River in County Tipperary, Ireland

Coordinates: 52°17′N 7°50′W

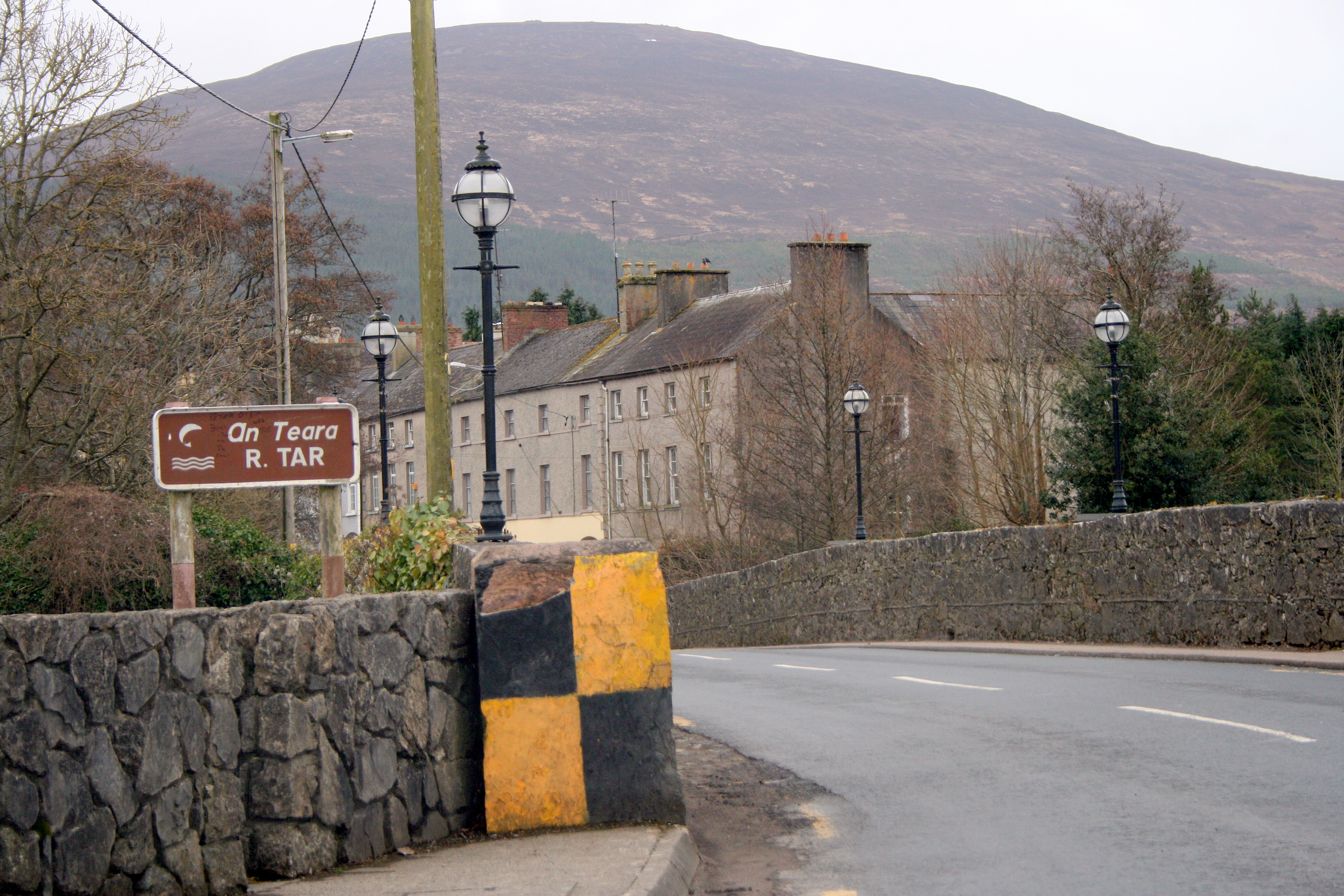
Bridge over the Tar at Clogheen, County Tipperary

The Tar (Irish: An Teara) is a river in County Tipperary, Ireland. It joins the Suir between the towns of Ardfinnan and Newcastle. The Tar's tributaries include the River Duag which joins it shortly after they both flow through Clogheen.

The Tar was an important source of power to drive grain processing mills up to the 19th century.
