= River Clare =

River in Counties Mayo and Galway, Ireland

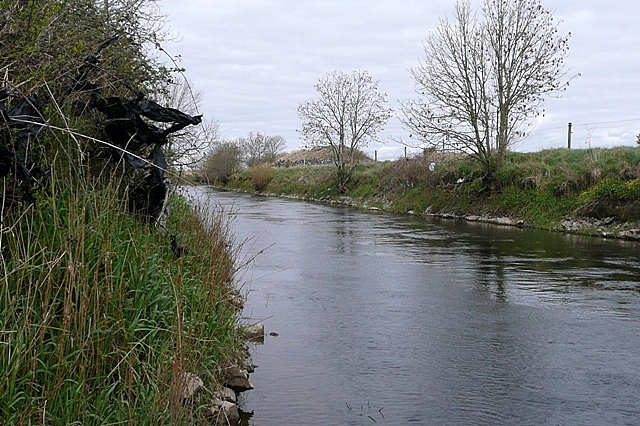
- The Clare on the east side of Lackagh
- Etymology: River of the plain
- Native name: Abhainn an Chláir (Irish)

Location
- Country: Ireland
- Cities: Claregalway, Corofin, County Galway, Milltown, Ballyhaunis

Physical characteristics
- Mouth
  - coordinates: 53.330°N 9.049°W
  - elevation: 5 metres (16 ft)
- Length: 93 km (58 mi)
- Basin size: 1,108 km^{2} (428 sq mi)
- Discharge
  - average: 22.9 m^{3}/s (810 cu ft/s)

Basin features
- River system: Corribs
- Tributaries
  - left: Grange River, Sinking River

The River Clare (Irish: Abhainn an Chláir) is a river in counties Mayo and Galway in Ireland.

The 93 kilometres (58 mi) long river rises north of Ballyhaunis in Mayo and descends past Dunmore, where it flows west, then turns south past Milltown continuing down through Kilbennan Church near Tuam. It continues south until past Turloughmore, then turns sharply west, flowing north of Claregalway and, thence, further westward into Lough Corrib. The River Corrib flow from the lake into Galway Bay. The Clare is the longest river in the Lough Corrib catchment.

A large section of it is a former turlough (Irish: turlach), which, at 6.5 square kilometres, used to be Ireland's largest.

The Clare has since the 1950s been subject to ongoing arterial drainage to lower the bed of the river and mitigate flooding. This has resulted in the river being straightened and canalized between ramparts of dredge material making access to the river difficult and compromising its value as a public amenity.

The river is an important spawning channel for salmon and trout and a noted fishery in its own right for both species.
