= Kells Blackwater =

River in eastern Ireland, tributary of the Boyne

Coordinates: 52°51′N 7°27′W

Kells Blackwater Leinster Blackwater
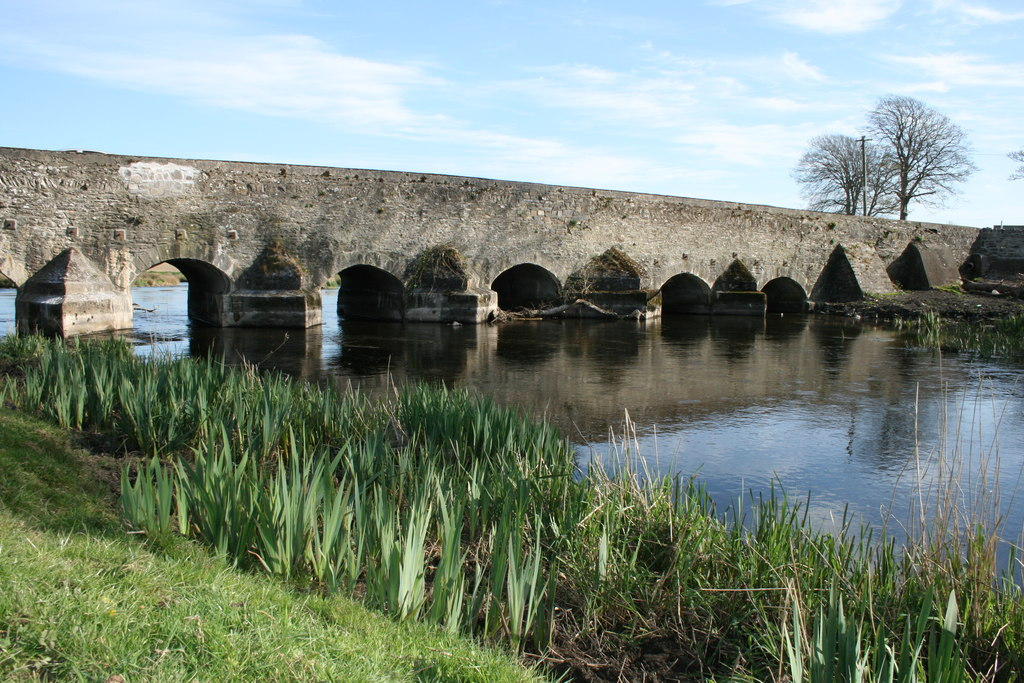
- Bridge carrying the R164 over the Blackwater at Moynalty
- Native name: An Abhainn Dubh (Irish)

Location
- Country: Ireland

Physical characteristics
- Source
  - location: South County Cavan
- Mouth: River Boyne
  - location: Navan, County Meath
- Length: 68 km (42 mi)
- Basin size: 733 km^{2} (283 sq mi)
- Discharge
  - average: 15.08 m^{3}/s (533 cu ft/s)

Basin features
- River system: Boyne

The Kells Blackwater (Irish: An Abhainn Dubh), also called the River Blackwater or Leinster Blackwater, is a river that flows through the counties of Cavan and Meath in Ireland. It is a tributary of the River Boyne which flows into the Irish Sea at Drogheda. (This is one of two River Blackwaters which flow into the Boyne in County Meath, the other originates in County Kildare).

It has its source in the south of County Cavan, near the town of Bailieborough.

In its passage through Lough Ramor at Virginia, County Cavan, it receives its strongest tributary, Nadreegeel Lough Stream (Openstreetmap: Nadrageel), which rises about 4 km south east of Lavey, between the sources of River Stradone and River Larah, the latter a tributary of River Annalee, a tributrary of River Erne, which reaches the ocean in County Donegal. Half way between the lake and Navan junction, it passes through Kells, County Meath.

In Navan, Kells Blackwater joins the River Boyne, more than 25 km before the Boyne reaches the Irish Sea.

== See also ==
- Rivers of Ireland
