= Stonestown River =

Physical characteristics
- Source
  - location: Counties Westmeath and Meath

The Stonestown River is a river in counties Westmeath and Meath in Ireland. The river originates near Clonmellon, on the Meath side of the border, before flowing into Westmeath. The river then re-enters Meath and flows into the River Boyne.
