= River Drish =

River in County Tipperary, Ireland

Location
- Country: Ireland

Physical characteristics
- Source
  - location: County Tipperary
- Mouth: River Suir
  - coordinates: 52°39′55″N 7°48′13″W

The River Drish is a river in Ireland. It is a tributary of River Suir, which it joins at Turtulla, just over 1½ km (about 1 mile) southeast of the town of Thurles.

== See also ==
- Rivers of Ireland
