= River Corrib =

River in Galway, Ireland

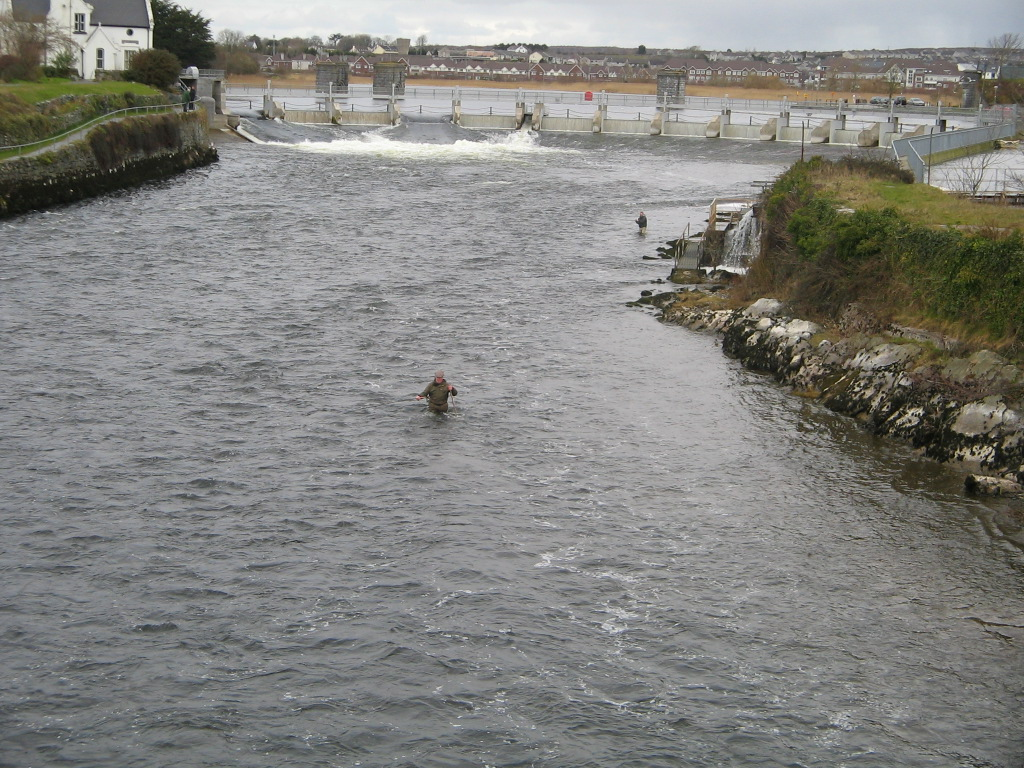
- Looking north from the Salmon Weir Bridge in Galway
- Etymology: Stony
- Native name: Abhainn na Gaillimhe (Irish)

Location
- Country: Ireland

Physical characteristics
- Source
  - location: Lough Corrib
- Mouth
  - location: Galway Bay and Atlantic Ocean at the Claddagh
  - coordinates: 53.26717°N 9.04599°W
- Length: 6 km (3.7 mi)
- Basin size: 3,101 km^{2} (1,197 sq mi)
- Discharge
  - average: 104.8 m^{3}/s (3,700 cu ft/s)

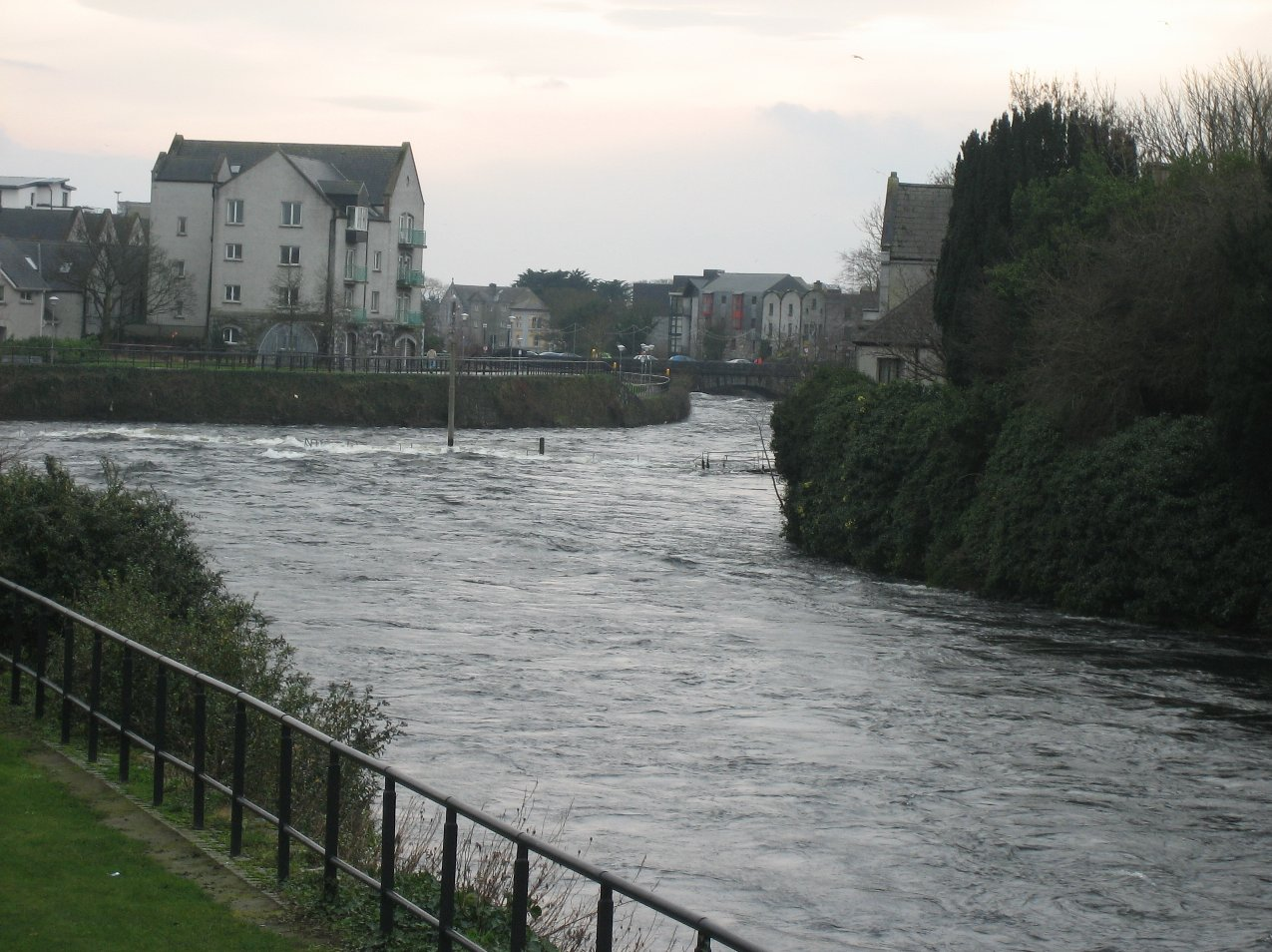
Looking south from the Salmon Weir Bridge

The River Corrib (Irish: Abhainn na Gaillimhe) in the west of Ireland flows from Lough Corrib through Galway to Galway Bay. The river is among the shortest in Europe, with only a length of six kilometres from the lough to the Atlantic. It is popular with local whitewater kayakers as well as several rowing clubs and pleasure craft. The depth of this river reaches up to 94 feet.

The Corrib drains a catchment area of 3,138 km^{2}.

Although the Corrib is one of Ireland's shortest rivers, it has a mean long-term flow rate of 104.8 m^{3}/s, making it Ireland's second-largest river (by flow), only surpassed by the River Shannon.

== Naming ==
The translation of the Irish name of the river is Galway river i.e. from Gaillimh. In Irish it is sometimes called An Ghaillimh ("the Galway") and also incorrectly called Abhainn na Coiribe. The legend concerning its naming states that it was called after Gaillimh inion Breasail, the daughter of a Fir Bolg chieftain who drowned in the river. The word Gaillimh is believed to mean "stony" as in "stony river". The commonly held myth that the city takes its name from the Irish word Gallaibh, "foreigners" i.e. "the town of the foreigners" (from Gall, a foreigner) is incorrect as the name Gaillimh was applied to the river first and then later onto the town. Indeed, the earliest settlement at Galway was called Dún Bhun na Gaillimhe, or "the fort at the end of the Galway (river)".

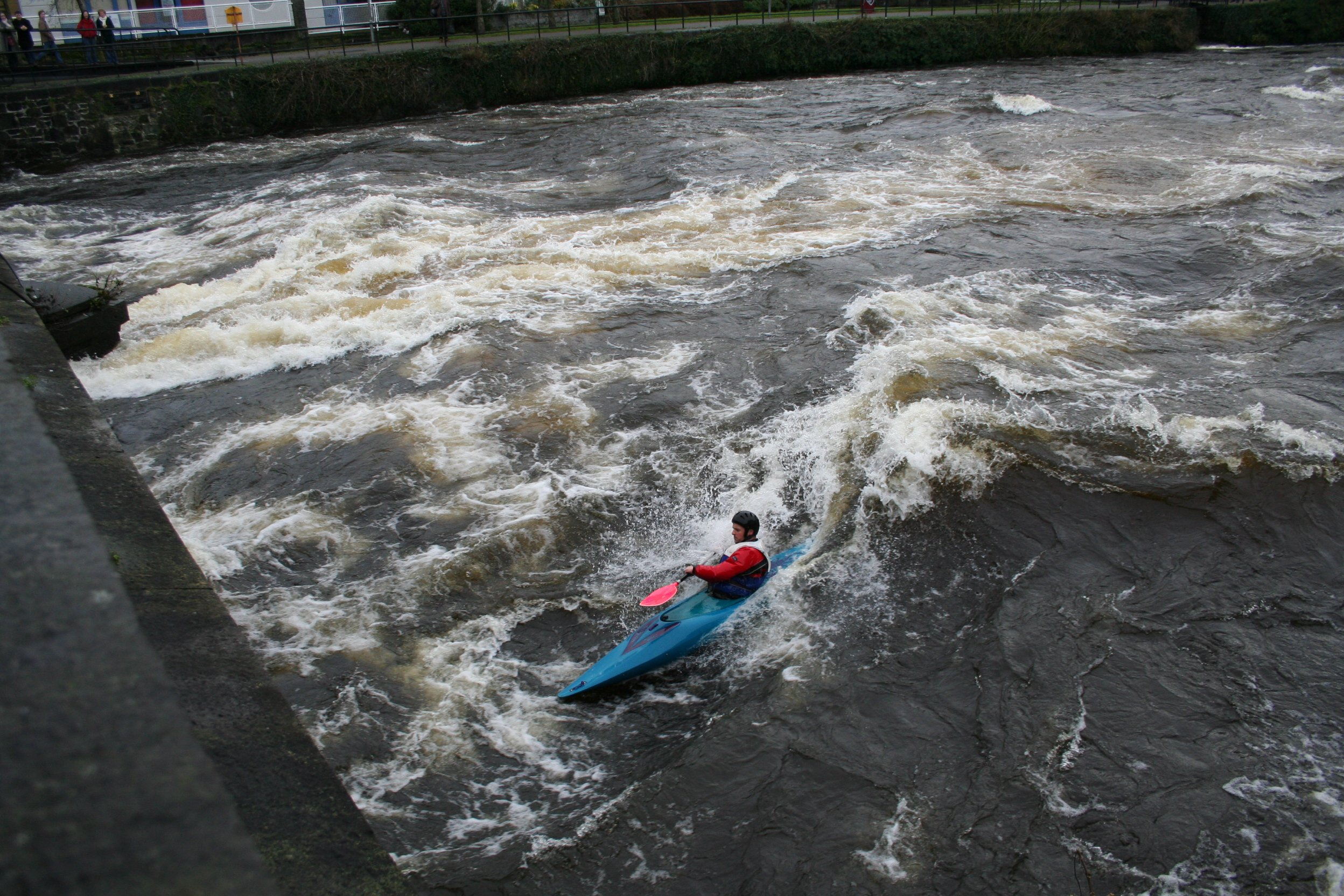
Kayaking the large standing wave at O'Briens Bridge

The river gave its name to the town, which grew to a city, and from c. 1570 onwards, the city gave its name to the county. It also aided massively in the industrial development of the town, allowing it to develop hydro-electricity before London, which provided the general public electricity via coal-fired generators since 1878. At the height of water power, there were over twenty water wheels in operation from races built on the river and its accompanying cut, the Eglinton Canal, which was built as part of the "Drainage and Navigation scheme of Lough Carra, Lough Corrib and Lough Mask" in the mid-19th century. The canal, which is about three-quarters of a mile long, had a sea-lock, a large basin, a second lock at Parkavore and five swivelling bridges. It is still in water but the swivelling bridges have been replaced by fixed bridges; the last vessel to use the navigation was the Amo II, a 90' motor-yacht that had been sold by the Guinness trustees to Frank Bailey, a Galway hotelier.

Lough Corrib is the anglicised form of Loch Coirib which itself is a corruption of Loch nOrbsean which, according to placename lore, is named after the Irish god of the sea. There is good fishing to be had on both the lake and river.

Ptolemy's Geography (2nd century AD) described a river called Αυσοβα (Ausoba) which probably referred to the River Corrib.

=== Upper and Lower Corrib ===
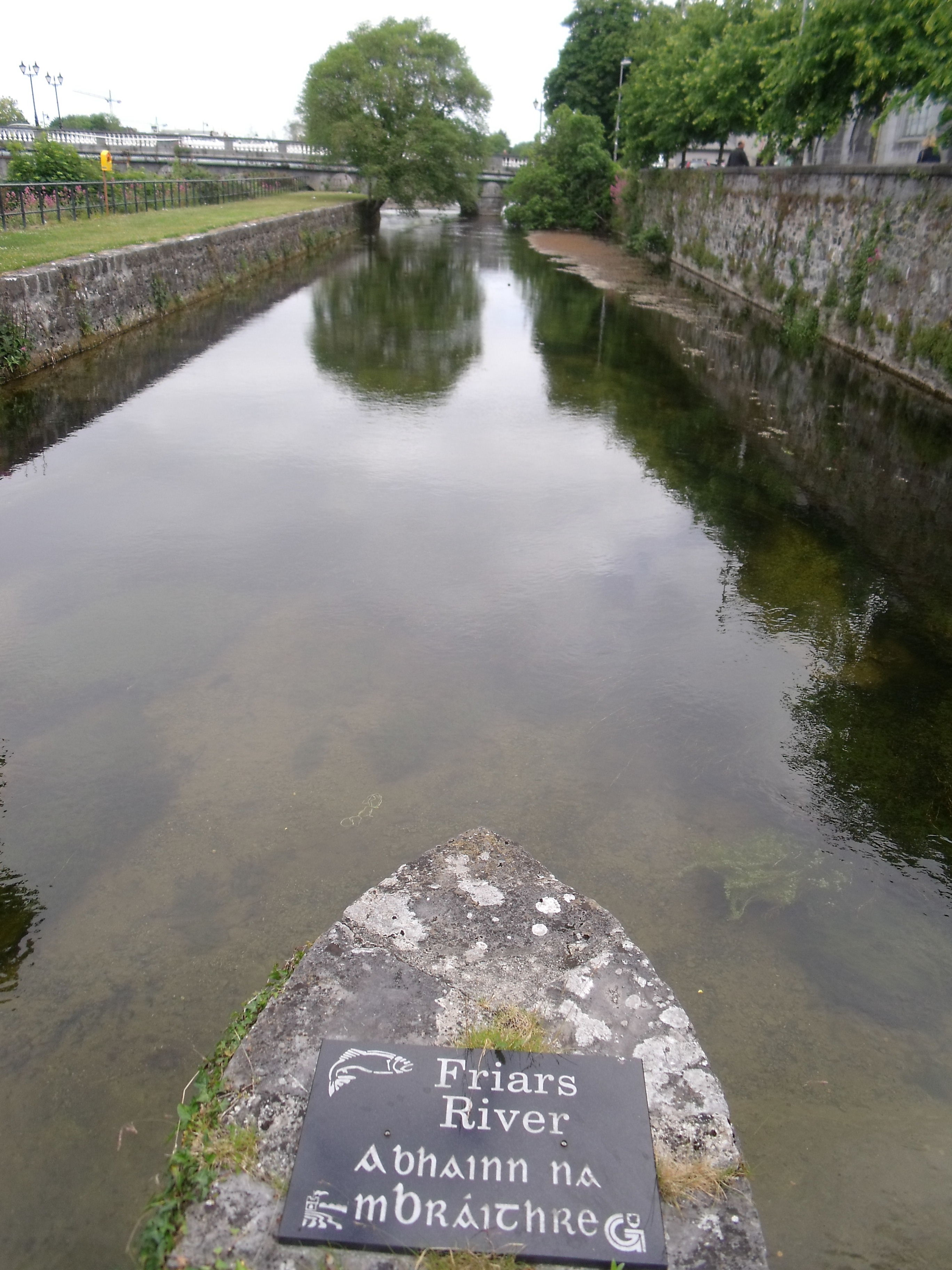
The Friars' Cut

The part of the river that flows from the southern end of the lake to the Salmon Weir is known as the Upper Corrib. The weir, a set of weir gates also built during the above navigation scheme, was originally built from stone and timber but now only two of these gates remain and are only opened in times of flood. The rest have been replaced by fourteen steel gates, as shown in the photograph above.

The main channel leaving Lough Corrib is called Friars' Cut or Friars' River (Irish: Abhainn na mBráithre) as it is the result of a very early piece of canal engineering. In 1178 the friars of Claregalway Abbey, being tired of the long detour they had to make to the west to enter the river, asked permission from the Blakes of Menloe to make an artificial cut, which in time became the main course of the river and was then widened.

The section of the river that runs from the Salmon Weir through Galway city and out into Galway Bay is known as the Lower Corrib. Three bridges cross the Lower – the Salmon Weir Bridge, William O'Brien Bridge and Wolfe Tone Bridge.

The only tributary of the Lower Corrib is Sruthán na gCaisleáin (Castle Stream) known by whitewater kayakers as the Shit Chute and the access point to the river, a small stream that flows through Newcastle, the grounds of NUI Galway, and empties into the Lower just downstream of King's weir, commonly known as the fish gates.

The official publication for NUI Galway Alumni, Staff & Friends, Cois Coiribe, is named in reference to the Corrib.

== Bridges ==
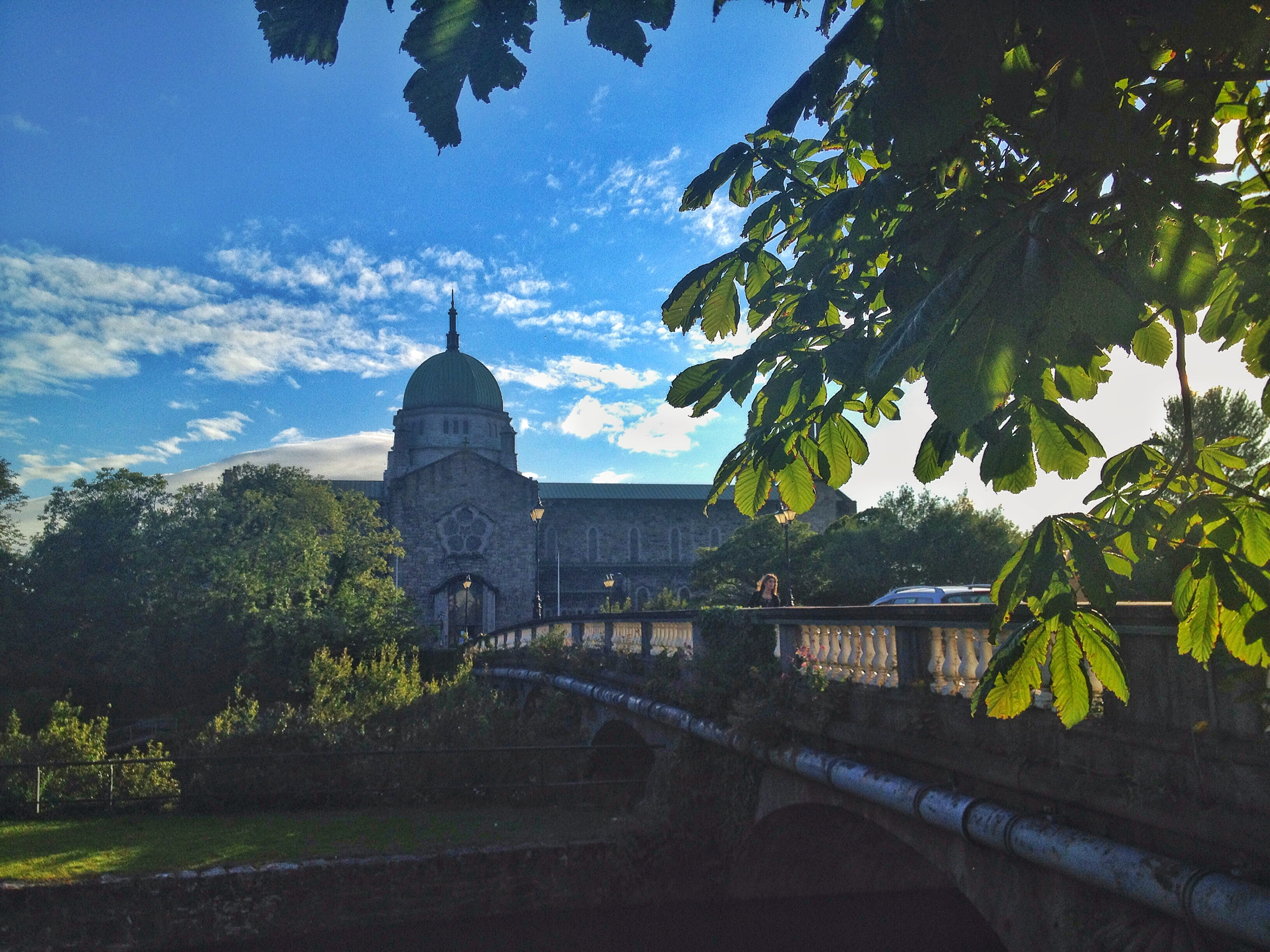
The Salmon Weir Bridge looking east towards Galway Cathedral

Five bridges span Corrib in Galway. These are the Wolfe Tone Bridge, the William O'Brien Bridge, the Salmon Weir Bridge, the Quincentenary Bridge and the pedestrian Droichead an Dóchas, recently completed in 2023. A new bridge, upsteam of the Quincentenary Bridge, is proposed to be built as part of the N6 Galway City Ring Road scheme.

== See also ==
- Rivers of Ireland
- List of rivers of Ireland
- List of loughs of Ireland
