= Lough Corrib =

Lake in the west of Ireland

- Loch Coirib (Irish)
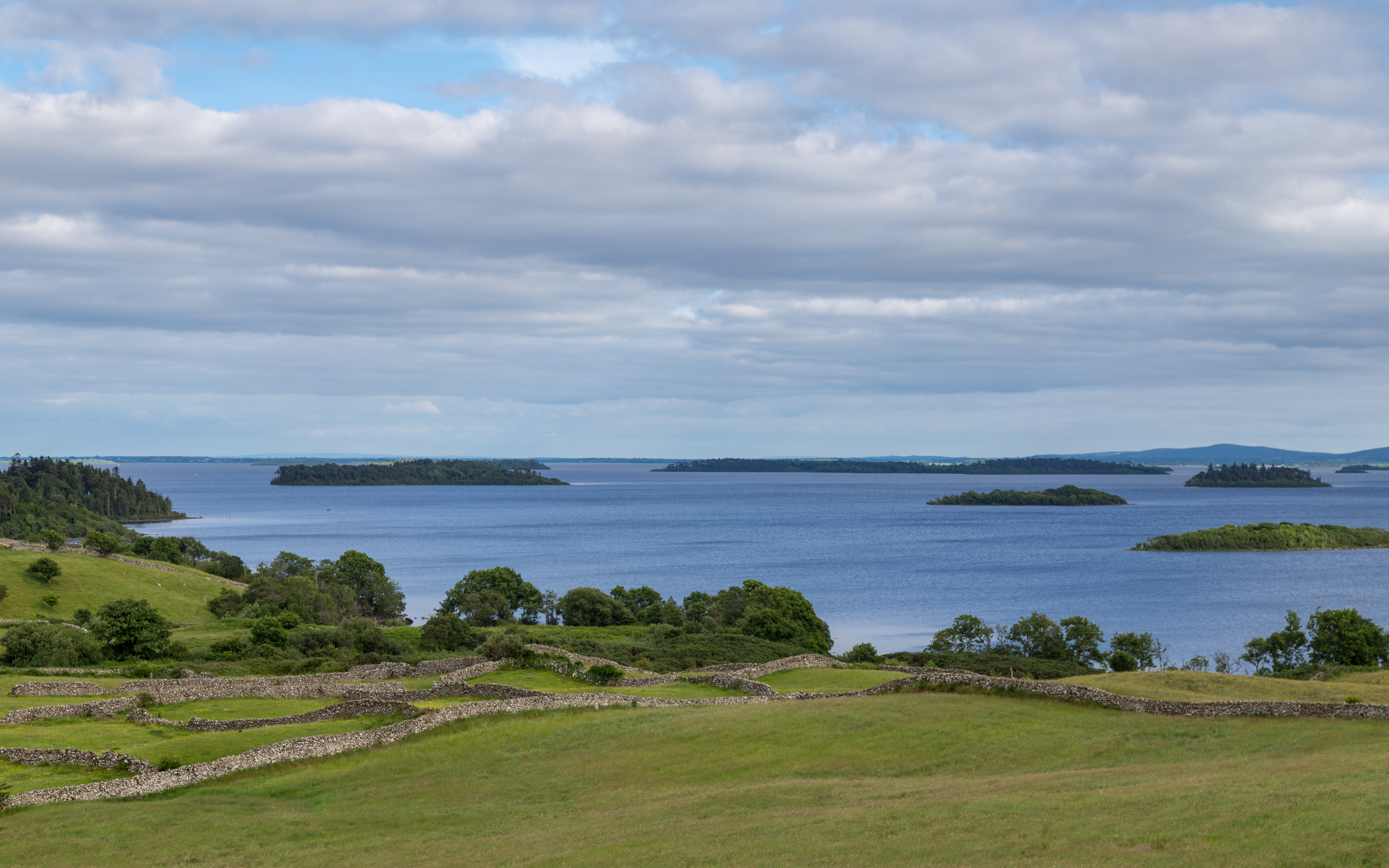
- View on Lough Corrib, south of Clonbur

- Location of Lough Corrib in Ireland
- Location: Connacht
- Coordinates: 53°26′N 9°14′W
- Primary inflows: Cregg River; River Clare; Black River
- Primary outflows: River Corrib
- Catchment area: 3,112 km^{2} (1,202 sq mi)
- Basin countries: Ireland
- Max. length: 43.5 km (27.0 mi)
- Max. width: 16.1 km (10.0 mi)
- Surface area: 176 km^{2} (68 sq mi)
- Average depth: 6.5 m (21 ft)
- Max. depth: 50.9 m (167 ft)

Ramsar Wetland
- Designated: 7 June 1996
- Reference no.: 846

Lough Corrib (/lɒx ˈkɒrɪb/ lokh KORR-ib; Irish: Loch Coirib) is a lake in the west of Ireland. The River Corrib or Galway River connects the lake to the sea at Galway. It is the largest lake within the Republic of Ireland and the second largest on the island of Ireland (after Lough Neagh). It covers 176 km^{2} and lies mostly in County Galway with a small area of its northeast corner in County Mayo.

The first canal on the island of Ireland was cut in the 12th century. Known as the Friar's Cut, it allowed boats to pass from Lough Corrib to the sea at Galway.

Lough Corrib was designated a Ramsar site in June 1996. It has also been designated a Special Area of Conservation.

== Name ==
Loch Coirib is a corruption of |Loch Oirbsean. According to placename lore, this refers to Oirbsen or Oirbsiu—another name for the Tuatha Dé Danann figure Manannán mac Lir—who is believed to have been a god of the sea. In Irish, the lough is also called An Choirib ("the Corrib").

== Marine archaeology and charts ==
Surveys have been undertaken since 2007 by a local surveyor/cartographer to create up-to-date charts of Lough Corrib. These have uncovered a number of objects of historical significance, which have been investigated by the Underwater Archaeology Unit of the National Monuments Service. These include Bronze Age and Iron Age vessels (dugout canoes), the "Annaghkeen Boat" being 40 ft in length and intricately carved, the "Carrowmoreknock Boat", a well preserved 10th century vessel carrying three Viking battle axes, and the wreck of a Victorian pleasure yacht. The lake is hence of international importance as a marine archaeological site. All historic wrecks in the lough are protected, and a licence to dive them is required from the National Monuments Service.

== Wildlife ==
The wildlife in Lough Corrib includes birds and hawks, otters, mink, stoat, frogs, and bats. Lough Corrib can be divided into two parts: a smaller shallower basin to the south and a larger deeper basin to the north. These two parts are connected by a narrow channel. In the southern and eastern parts of the lake, the lake bed is dominated by limestone bedrock covered by deposits of precipitated marl. The surrounding land is mostly pastoral farmland to the south and east and bog to the west and north.

In addition to the lake basis, some areas of scientific interest adjoining the lake, e.g. woodland, callows grassland and raised bog, have been incorporated into the Lough Corrib Special Area of Conservation.

== Threats to ecology ==
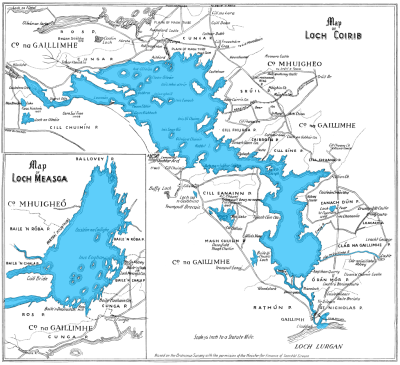
A map taken from the Admiralty Chart made in 1846

In early 2007, large numbers of the protozoan parasite Cryptosporidium were detected in water from the lake, leading to contamination of the public water supply in Galway city and an outbreak of cryptosporidiosis. Another unwelcome visitor is the invasive species Lagarosiphon major (also known as 'curly-leaved waterweed' or 'South African pondweed') which is destroying fish habitat and the zebra mussel.

=== Cryptosporidium outbreak ===
On 21 March 2007, Cryptosporidium was confirmed to be present in the drinking water of Galway City, Moycullen, Oughterard and Headford, which had been instructed six days earlier to boil their water before drinking. The water taken from Lough Corrib was likely contaminated by migration of animal and human faeces. Controversy emerged when it was revealed that funds previously earmarked to improve Galway's water system had not been spent. Dick Roche, the Minister of the Environment, later announced allocation of additional funds to tackle the issue. Measures included upgrading existing water treatment and filtration systems, as well as the projected importing of water from nearby Luimnagh, Tuam, County Galway. This plant at Luimnagh has facilities for Cryptosporidium eradication and filtration.

The Community Care Organisation, Cope, delivered bottled water to their elderly clients from 30 March 2007. A lobby group was formed in April 2007 to highlight the issue.

== Islands ==
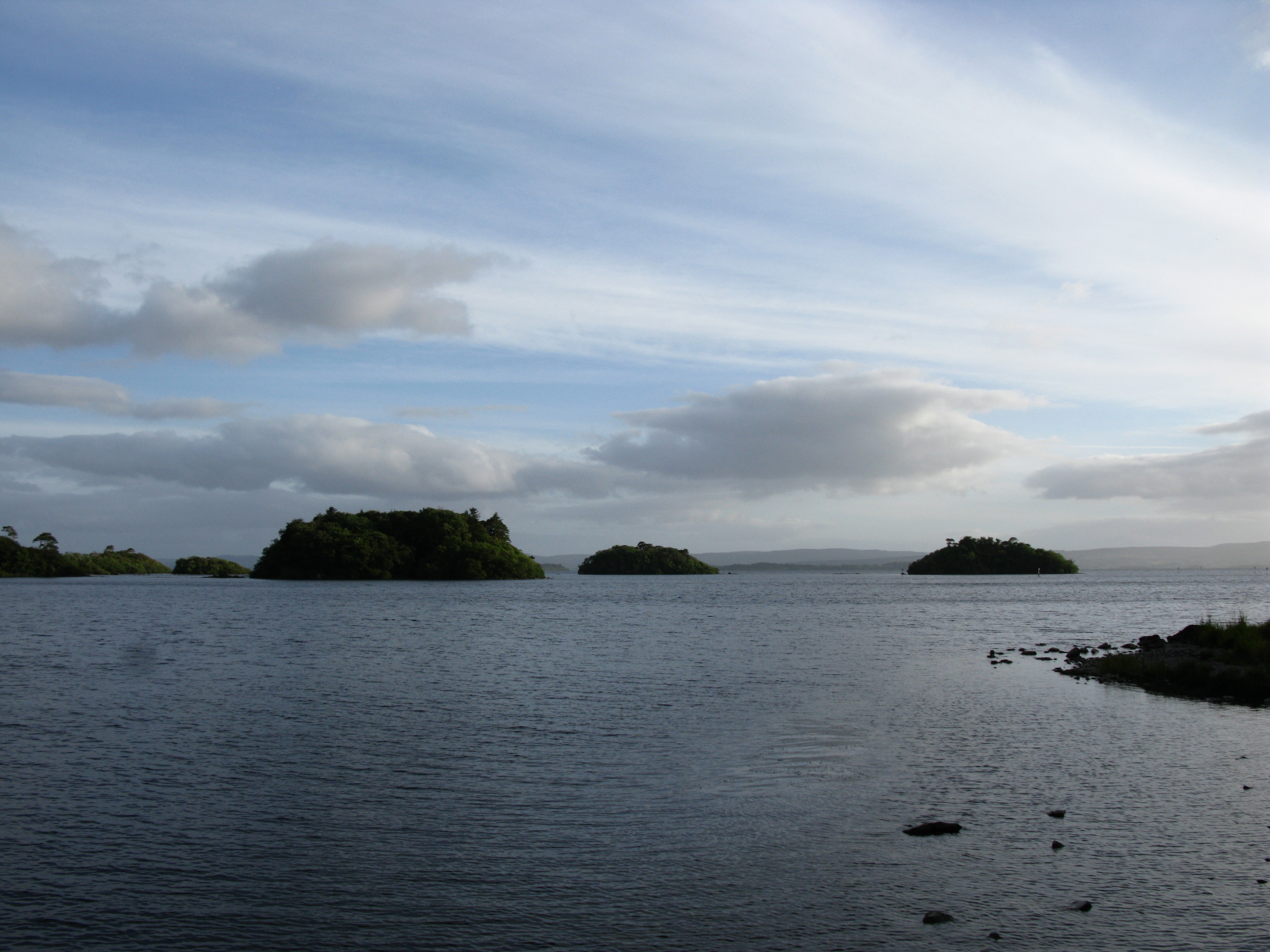
Minor islands in Lough Corrib

While Lough Corrib is reputed to have 365 islands, a recent figure from the creator of the charts of the lake is 1,327. These islands include Inchagoil Island, midway between Cong and Oughterard. It is one of the largest of the wooded islands along Lough Corrib. The island has views of the Maumturk range, Joyce Country and the mountains of Connemara. There are some beaches and woods with walks around the island. There is evidence of an early monastic settlement, and two churches - Saint Patrick's and the 12th century church known as the "saints" church. St. Brendan of Clonfert is also said to have spent some time on an island in this lake after returning from his travels in Britain. There are several paths around the island, an old cemetery and remains of four or five cottages which housed the few inhabitants.

Another lake island is Caislean-na-Circe, between Maam and Doon. This section of Lough Corrib is free from islands except for the rock on which the ancient Hen's Castle of the O'Connor's and the O'Flaherty's stands. The castle was home of the pirate Queen Gráinne O'Malley, who lived in the time of Queen Elizabeth I. In 1225, the Lord Justice caused Odo O'Flatherty to give up Kirk Castle to Odo O'Connor, King of Connaught; for assurance of his fidelity. Cruises on the lough depart from Cong, Ashford Castle, Galway City, and Oughterard.

== Influence on writers ==
Paul Féval's novel La Quittance de minuit (1846) is set in County Galway, near Lough Corrib.

William Wilde, father of Oscar Wilde, wrote a book about the lake, Lough Corrib, its Shores and Islands (1867). He built a summerhouse on the banks of the lake, called Moytura House. The 2009 drama Nothing Personal was filmed in part at Moytura.

The Irish Times states that "the unspoilt countryside around Lough Corrib provided the inspiration" for The Hounds of the Morrigan, a children's novel by Pat O'Shea.

== Annalistic references ==
See Annals of Inisfallen (AI)

- AI1027.9 Muiredach Ua Flaithbertaig besieged Cathal, son of Ruaidrí, on Inis Crema in Loch Oirbsen, and divided his land despite him.

== See also ==
- Lough Mask
- Lough Carra
- List of loughs of County Mayo
- List of loughs in Ireland
- Milwaukee Cryptosporidium outbreak
