= Henry Lynch =

Henry Lynch may refer to:

- Henry Lynch (baseball) (1866–1925), baseball player
- Sir Henry Lynch, 1st Baronet (died 1635), knight and land agent
- Sir Henry Lynch, 3rd Baronet (died 1691), Irish landowner, barrister and judge
- Henry Blosse Lynch (1807–1873), Anglo-English explorer
- Henry T. Lynch (1928-2019), American physician
- H. F. B. Lynch (Henry Finnis Blosse Lynch, 1862–1913), British traveller, businessman and Member of Parliament

== See also ==
- Henry Lynch-Staunton (1873–1941), British sport shooter, who competed in the 1908 Summer Olympics
