= Alice Harriet Blosse Lynch =

Anglo-German aristocrat

Alice Harriet von Kessler
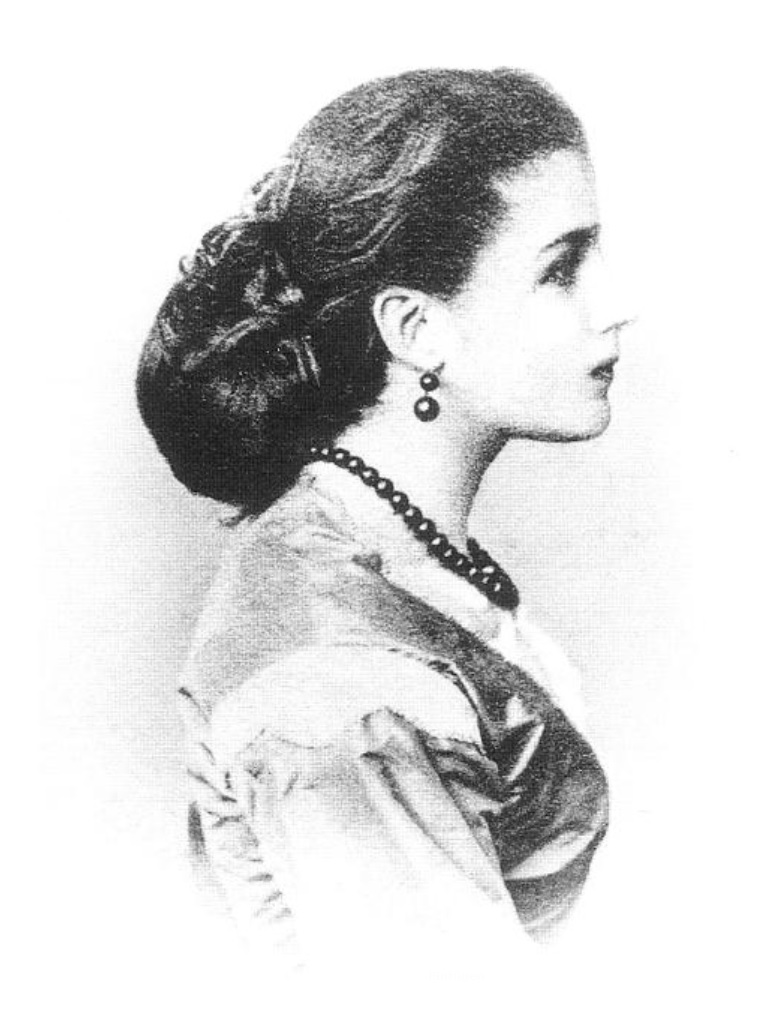
- Countess von Kessler in 1868.
- Born: Alice Harriet Blosse Lynch; 17 July 1844; Byculla, Bombay, British India
- Died: 19 September 1919 (aged 75); Sainte-Honorine-la-Chardonne, France
- Resting place: Père Lachaise Cemetery
- Spouse: Count Adolf Wilhelm von Kessler
- Children: 2 (including Harry von Kessler)
- Parent(s): Henry Blosse Lynch; Caroline Anne Taylor
- Relatives: Thomas Kerr Lynch (uncle)

Countess Alice Harriet von Kessler, née Blosse Lynch (1844-1919), was an Anglo-Irish aristocrat, singer, and society figure. She was known to be admired by German Emperor Wilhelm I and was rumored to have been his mistress.

== Biography ==
Alice Harriet Blosse Lynch was born on 17 July 1844, in Byculla. Her mother, Caroline Anne Taylor, was the daughter of Colonel Robert Taylor, who served as the king's Minister in Baghdad. Her father, Henry Blosse Lynch of Partry House, was an Anglo-Irish explorer and officer in the Royal Navy. She was a member of the Lynch family, a prominent landed gentry family that was part of the Tribes of Galway.

She was regarded as a great beauty and was known as an accomplished mezzo-soprano singer in society.

On 10 August 1867, she married the German banker Adolf Wilhelm Kessler in Paris. She gave birth to 2 children, Harry and Wilhelmina. German Emperor Wilhelm I was an admirer of hers. She named the emperor as her daughter's godfather. Rumors circulated that she was Wilhelm I's mistress. Some reports circulated that her children were actually the illegitimate children of the emperor.

Her husband was elevated into the hereditary nobility by Wilhelm I in 1879. Her husband was elevated a second time, as a count, in 1881 by Heinrich XXIV, Prince Reuss of Köstritz.

She died on 19 September 1919, and was buried in Père Lachaise Cemetery in Paris.
