= Carnacon =

Townland in County Mayo, Ireland

Carnacon Ceathrú na Con
- Townland
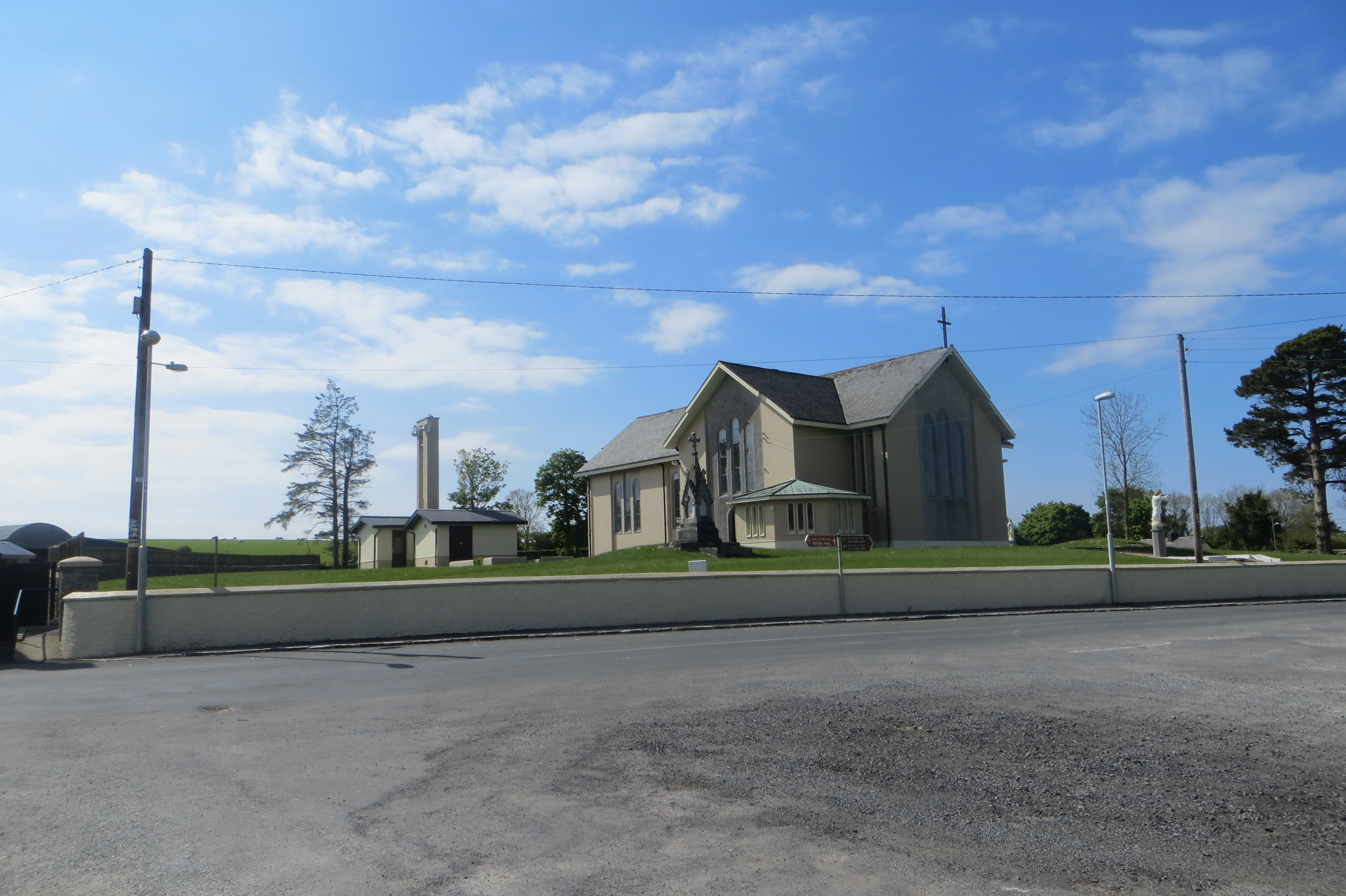
- St. Mary's Church

- Location in Ireland
- Coordinates: 53.7346°N 9.2229°W
- Country: Ireland
- Province: Connacht
- County: County Mayo
- Elevation: 25 m (82 ft)
- Irish Grid Reference: M193768

Carnacon or Carrownacon (Irish: Ceathrú na Con, meaning 'hound's quarter') is a village, townland and area in central County Mayo, Ireland. It is situated about 12 miles (19 km) from Castlebar, and is about 8 miles (13 km) from Claremorris and Ballinrobe.

== Village ==
Carnacon is situated near the shores of Lough Carra, a lake noted for mayfly angling. The surrounding landscape features a concentration of historical country houses, ringforts, and archaeological sites, including the Doon archaeological peninsula and numerous early medieval rath dwellings.

The village contains a Catholic parish church (St. Mary's), Burriscarra National School, a community centre, a grocery store, and local public houses. The area is represented nationally in sport by Carnacon LGFA, a highly successful ladies Gaelic football club.

== History and Heritage Sites ==
=== Prehistory and Early History ===
The name Carnacon is derived from the Irish Carn na gCon, translating to "Cairn of the Hounds." The surrounding landscape of the ancient civil parishes of Burriscarra and Touaghty shows evidence of early human settlement, characterized by numerous earthen ringforts (rath dwellings) and enclosure sites dating from the Bronze Age through the Early Medieval period. The area also features historical Mass Rocks utilized for clandestine Catholic worship during the enforcement of the Penal Laws in the 17th and 18th centuries.

Despite the restrictions of the Penal Laws, which saw most land ownership shift to the Protestant Ascendancy (or via conversions), the Carnacon area is notable for retaining a dense network of prominent, wealthy Catholic gentry families. While some of these lineages—such as the Moore family of Moore Hall—originally descended from English Protestant settler stock, they integrated into the region over generations through strategic intermarriages with Catholic families and tactical compliance with property laws, allowing them to retain their estates. The local estates of Moore Hall, Clogher House, Towerhill, Castle Carra, and Carnacon House were all held by these established landowners who actively influenced regional and national politics, law, and religious patronage across successive generations.

=== Moore Hall ===
Situated on Muckloon Hill overlooking Lough Carra, Moore Hall was a prominent country house constructed between 1792 and 1795 for George Moore, a wealthy merchant who had accumulated a fortune in Alicante, Spain. The estate served as the ancestral home of several notable historical and cultural figures, including John Moore, who was appointed President of the Republic of Connacht during the 1798 Rebellion, and George Augustus Moore, the prominent novelist and figure of the Irish Literary Revival.

In 1846, George Henry Moore won the Chester Cup in England with his horse, Coranna, which had been trained locally on the estate grounds. Moore utilized the £17,000 in winnings to finance extensive famine relief operations for his tenants during the Great Hunger, ensuring that no one on his estate was evicted for non-payment of rent.

During the Irish Civil War, the mansion, then owned by novelist George Augustus, was targeted due to the political stance of his brother, Senator Colonel Maurice Moore, who supported the Anglo-Irish Treaty and had been nominated a Senator in the new Irish Free State Parliament. On 1 February 1923, anti-Treaty elements of the Irish Republican Army intentionally burned the house down, destroying its vast historical library and art collection. The roofless limestone façade remains structurally intact, and the surrounding estate lands are currently operated as a public forest park under the stewardship of Coillte and Mayo County Council.

=== Towerhill ===
Towerhill was an 18th-century country house located in the townland of Towerhill Demesne near Carnacon. The house was built between 1760 and 1765 by Isidore Blake, the estate served as the ancestral seat of the Blake family, a prominent land-owning family who held over 11,000 acres in the region during the 19th century. The estate is associated with the origin of the green and red Mayo GAA county colours, which were first worn by local players during an early Gaelic football match hosted on the grounds by Valentine Blake. Clooneen Mill, a historic watermill, is also situated on the estate grounds.

Following the death of Valentine Joseph Blake in 1947, the estate was acquired by the Land Commission, which divided the agricultural land among local farmers. The house's contents were cleared via public auction in 1948, and the building itself was stripped of its roofing and structural stonework during a demolition auction in 1949. The roofless limestone shell remains intact but is largely obscured by subsequent forestry overgrowth.

=== Clogher House ===
Located in the townland of Clogher, Clogher House (originally known as Clogher Lynch) was a Georgian country house built between 1765 and 1770. It was the home of a junior branch of the Lynch family who held a 999-year lease on the 640-acre estate from Sir Henry Lynch-Blosse, 8th Bt. Following extensive roof damage during the "Night of the Big Wind" storm in January 1839, the property was remodelled by the Crean-Lynch family, who added a third storey. Ownership passed to the FitzGerald-Kenney family in 1870 following the marriage of Helena Crean-Lynch to James Christopher FitzGerald-Kenney. The Lynch family served as prominent benefactors to the local Burriscarra parish church in Carnacon, donating various items of church plate and altar furnishings. It was the lifelong residence of barrister and Minister for Justice James FitzGerald-Kenney. Following his death in 1956, the house and estate were sold in 1967, and the mansion was destroyed by a fire in 1970. The site currently stands in ruins.

=== Carnacon House ===
Located near the village, Carnacon House (Carrownacon House) is a Georgian country house built between 1740 and 1750. It was constructed as the seat of John McDonnell, a Justice of the Peace, and his wife Mary (née Lynch) of Castle Carra. Their son, James Joseph McDonnell, a lawyer and Colonel of the United Irishmen, utilized the property during his organization of the 1798 Connacht Rebellion. Following subsequent ownership changes, the estate was purchased by a local family in the 1940s. It remains the only historic Georgian country house in the immediate parish area that has avoided abandonment and remains fully inhabited as a private residence.

=== Burriscarra Abbey ===
Burriscarra Abbey is a ruined medieval friary situated on the shores of Lough Carra. It was originally founded in 1298 by Adam de Staunton for the Carmelite Order. The house fell into decay during the 14th century and was subsequently transferred to the Augustinian Friars in 1413 following a papal decree by Pope John XXIII. The abbey remained active until the Dissolution of the Monasteries under King Henry VIII, after which the property was leased to secular landlords. The surviving architectural ruins include a long church featuring a Gothic pointed chancel arch, an east window with defensive stone mullions, and the structural foundations of adjacent domestic buildings and cloisters. The abbey ruins are situated within the Burriscarra - Carnacon Graveyard, an active burial ground since the days of friary. The site is listed as a protected National Monument.

=== Castle Carra ===
Castle Carra is a ruined 13th-century fortified hall-house situated on the eastern shore of Lough Carra, approximately 2.5 kilometres west of Carnacon village. The castle was originally constructed by the Anglo-Norman settler Adam de Staunton. In the 15th century, the property underwent extensive remodelling by the MacEvilly family (a Gaelicized branch of the Stauntons), who added a defensive plinth, bawn wall, outbuildings, and a gateway. The fortification was surrendered to the Crown in the 1570s and granted to Captain William Bowen, who fortified the bawn with a circular flanker featuring inland-facing gun loops.

Following the Cromwellian land confiscations, during which the prominent Lynch family lost most of their ancestral holdings in County Galway and County Mayo. The Castle Carra estate was granted to Sir Henry Lynch, 3rd Baronet, in the 1660s by King Charles II under the Restoration Settlement. As an influential Catholic jurist, the 3rd Baronet later aligned directly with the Jacobite cause and King James II, who appointed him a Baron of the Exchequer during his brief reign in Ireland. Following the Jacobite defeat at the Battle of the Boyne in 1690, the 3rd Baronet was attainted of high treason and fled to France, but the family strategically leveraged legal claims and marriages to successfully retain the Castle Carra estate under the Williamite Settlement.

In the early 18th century, his grandson Sir Henry Lynch, 5th Baronet, abandoned the medieval fortification and constructed a new, separate country house residence adjacent to the castle ruins, featuring formal stone terraces leading to the lakeshore. Following the family's relocation to Athavallie House near Balla, the property was abandoned; an 1844 estate survey by land surveyor Samuel Nicholson described the country house and surrounding offices as "now almost ruins." The subsequent 18th-century country house was eventually demolished, while the original three-storey medieval tower house is preserved under state guardianship as a protected National Monument under Reference No. 222B.

== Geography and Environment ==
Carnacon is situated within the limestone lowland landscape of South Mayo, characterized by undulating pastureland, glacial drumlins, and carboniferous limestone bedrock. arming is the main activity in the area. The local environment aids a long grass-growing season. The area extends over approximately 7,166 acres. 741 acres of this is woodland, owned and managed by Coillte. The village is positioned approximately 2.5 kilometres east of Lough Carra, a 4,000-acre post-glacial lake. Lough Carra is a notable marl lake, characterized by hard, calcium-rich waters and a distinct pale green color caused by calcium carbonate precipitation.

The aquatic and terrestrial environment surrounding the village is largely designated as a Special Area of Conservation (SAC) and a Special Protection Area (SPA) under the European Union's Habitats Directive. The local habitat supports diverse alkaline fen vegetation, native hazel and ash woodlands, and provides critical nesting grounds for various waterfowl and the protected lesser horseshoe bat (Rhinolophus hippo-sideros). The remaining land use in the parish consists primarily of pastoral agriculture and managed commercial forestry, notably on the former historical demesne lands of Moore Hall and Towerhill.

== Notable people ==
- James FitzGerald-Kenney – Barrister, South Mayo TD, and former Irish Minister for Justice.
- James Joseph McDonnell, Lawyer, 1798 rebel leader - United Irishman and French army officer.
- George Augustus Moore, Irish novelist and part of the Irish Literary Revival.
- George Henry Moore, statesman, provider of famine relief.
- John Moore, statesman, 1798 rebel leader and former President of Connacht.
- Maurice George Moore, soldier, author, politician and a senator in the Seanad.
- Aoibhinn Ní Shúilleabháin, academic, musician and broadcaster.
- Cora Staunton, ladies Gaelic footballer and professional Australian rules footballer.

== Gallery ==
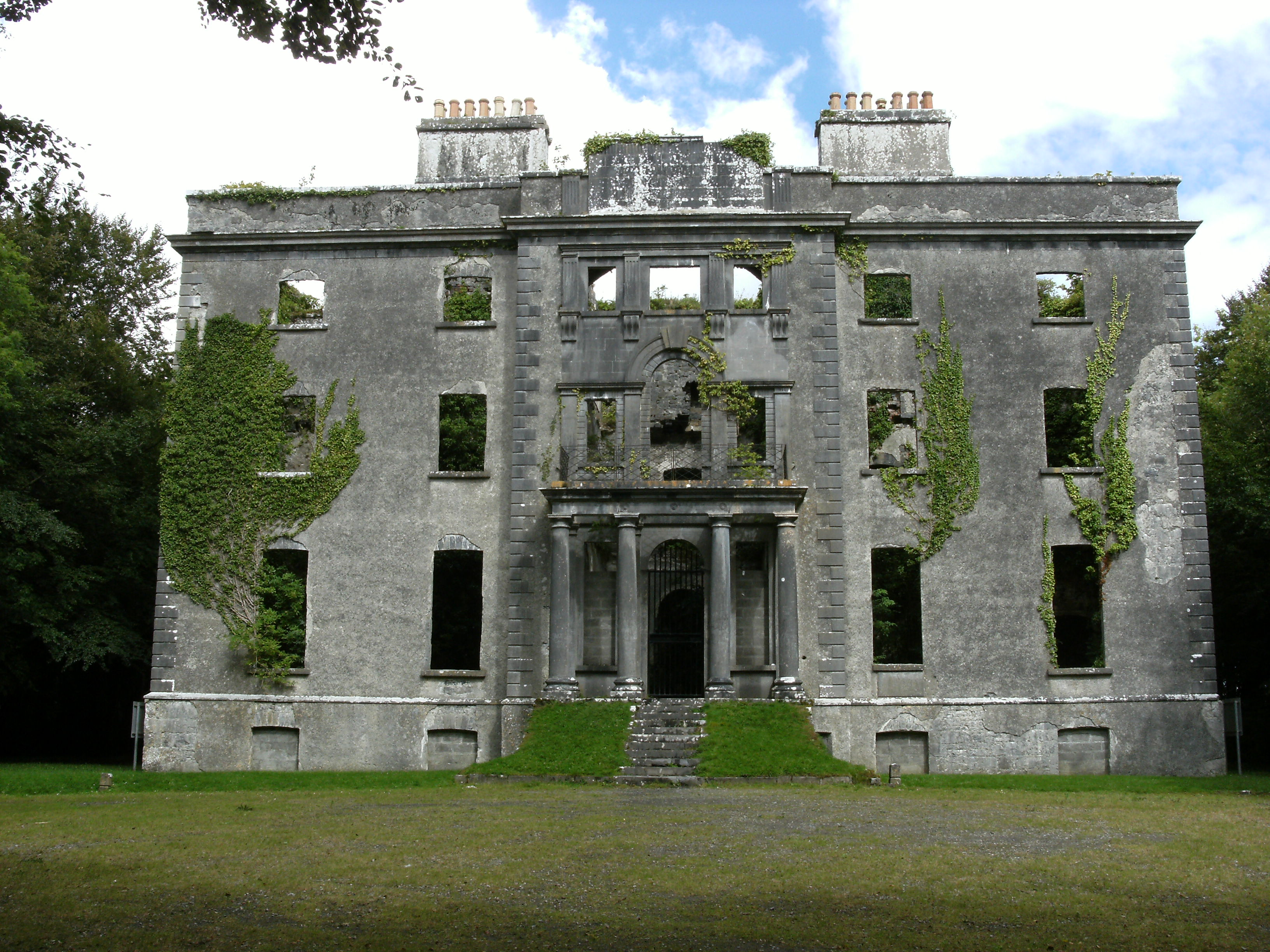
Moore Hall façade, County Mayo

Moore Hall, late 1890s

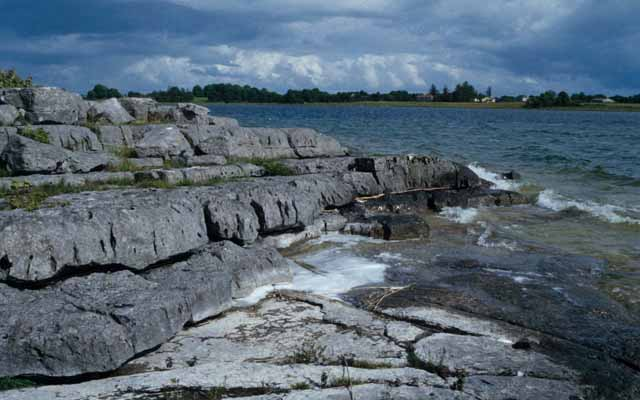
Lough Carra

Facade and inside of Towerhill

Clogher House, 2018

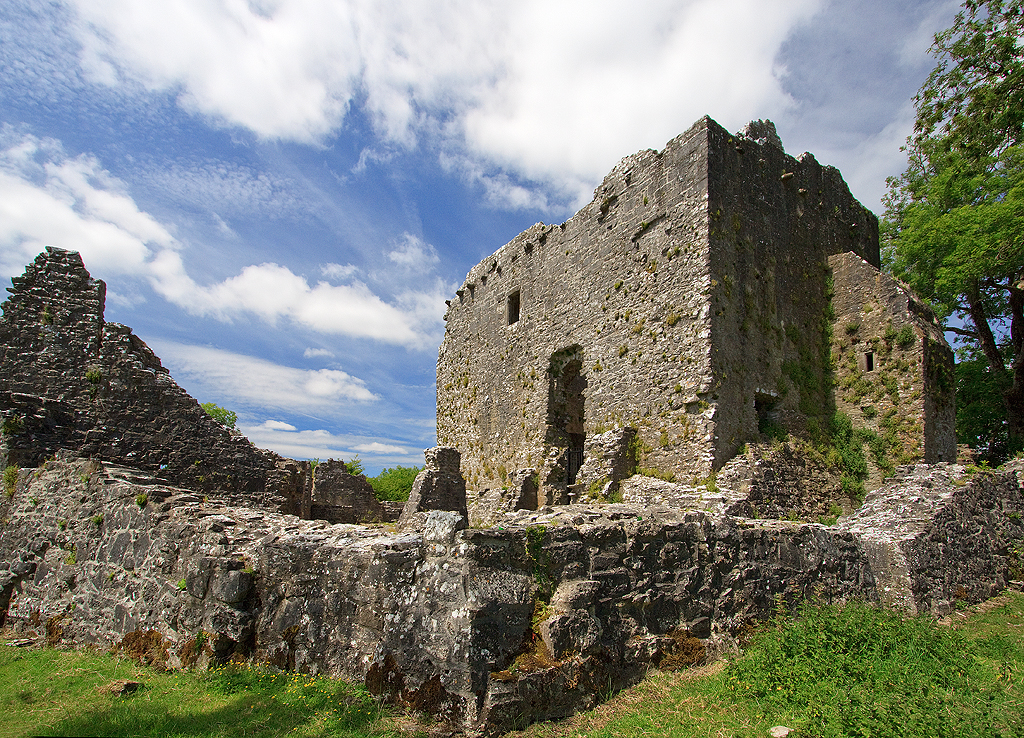
Castle Carra, 2010
