= Walter Riabhac Ó Dorchaidhe =

Walter Riabhac Ó Dorchaidhe, Irish merchant and founder of the Darcy tribe of Galway, fl. c. 1488.

== History ==
Walter Riabhac Ó Dorchaidhe was a member of a family from Partraige in what is now County Mayo. They are not featured in any extant Irish annal or chronicle, and the only record of them in Gaelic sources is a brief note stating that the Uí Dorchaidhe was lord of the Partriage, while their king was the Ó Goirmiallaigh.

Walter Riabhach settled in Galway sometime in the mid-15th century. Dubhaltach MacFhirbhisigh states that he was the first man of the Uí Dorchaidhe who came to Galway, according to the Galweigians themselves. Few of the family feature in an extant city records until the lifetime of James Riabhach Darcy. His descendants include:

- James Riabhach Darcy, Mayor of Galway, died 1602
- Patrick D'Arcy, Irish Confederate, died 1668.
- Patrick d'Arcy, mathematician and soldier, died 1779.

Other bearers of the name include:

- Louis Darcy (Lugháidhe Ó Dorchaidhe), member of Irish Republican Army, died 1921.
- Tony D'Arcy, Irish Republican Hunger-striker, died April 1940.
