= Harry von Kessler =

Anglo-German count, diplomat, writer, and patron of modern art (1868–1937)

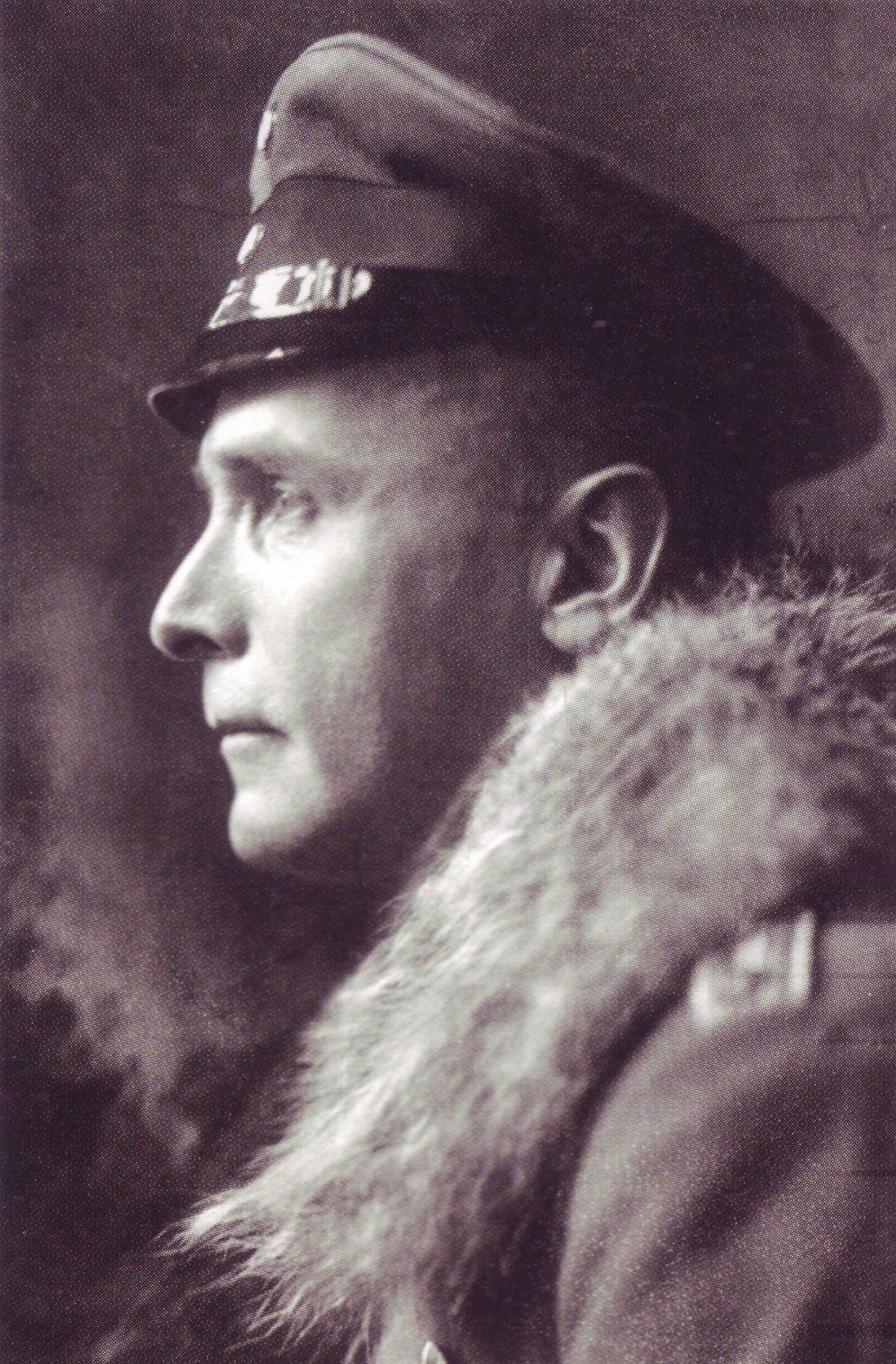
- Kessler in 1917
- Born: 23 May 1868; Paris, French Empire
- Died: 30 November 1937 (aged 69); Lyon, France
- Education: University of Bonn; University of Leipzig
- Occupations: diplomat, writer, arts patron
- Parent(s): Adolf Wilhelm von Kessler; Alice Harriet Blosse Lynch
- Relatives: Henry Blosse Lynch (grandfather)

Count Harry Clemens Ulrich von Kessler (Harry Clemens Ulrich Graf von Kessler in German; 23 May 1868 – 30 November 1937), also known as Harry Graf Kessler, was an Anglo-German diplomat, writer, and patron of modern art. English translations of his diaries Journey to the Abyss (2011) and Berlin in Lights (1971) reveal anecdotes and details of artistic, theatrical, and political life in Europe, mostly in Germany, from the late 19th century through the collapse of Germany at the end of World War I until his death in Lyon in 1937.

== Family ==
Harry Kessler's parents were the Hamburg banker Count Adolf Wilhelm von Kessler (24 November 1838 – 22 January 1895) and Alice Harriet Blosse-Lynch (born 17 July 1844 in Bombay; died 19 September 1919 in Normandy), the daughter of Anglo-Irish Henry Blosse Lynch, C.B., of Partry House, County Mayo. Kessler's parents married in Paris on 10 August 1867; Kessler was born, also in Paris, in 1868. Kessler's younger sister was born in 1877, and was named Wilhelmina after Kaiser Wilhelm I, who became the child's godfather. After marriage, her name would become Wilma de Brion.

There were many rumours about a supposed affair between Kaiser Wilhelm I and Countess Alice Kessler. The swift rise of the Kessler family led to a legend that either Harry or his sister were the illegitimate offspring of the Emperor and Countess Alice Kessler, but Harry was born two years before his mother met the Emperor, and the Emperor was eighty years old when his sister Wilhelmina was born.

Adolf Wilhelm Kessler was ennobled in 1879 and again in 1881, Harry inheriting the titles on his father's death.

== Life and work ==
Kessler grew up in France, England and Germany. He was educated first in Paris and then, from 1880, in St. George's School, Ascot, an English boarding school where one of his classmates was Winston Churchill. His education at St. George's made him into an Anglophile, and for a time he fancied himself to be an "English gentleman". Following his father's wishes he enrolled in 1882 at the Gelehrtenschule des Johanneums in Hamburg, where he completed his Abitur (high-school education). Afterwards he joined the 3rd Garde-Ulanen regiment in Potsdam and earned the rank of an army officer. He studied law and art history in Bonn and Leipzig respectively. As a university student, Kessler was among a group of students invited in 1891 to see the former chancellor Otto von Bismarck at his residence in Kissingen. After spending an afternoon drinking coffee with Bismarck, Kessler wrote that Bismarck still had an impressive voice, but "the longer and apparently the [more] freely the prince spoke, the more the feeling of numbed helplessness grew stronger...His conversation had something ghost-like, as if we hauled him from the company of dead contemporaries out of the grave". Kessler was acutely conscious that as the 20th century approached that he was living in an "übergangszeit" ("age of transition"), but a transition to what both fascinated and appalled him as he wondered if the new century would bring advancement to a better civilization or a retrogression into barbarism. Kessler was a great believer in the concept of Bildung, an untranslatable German word that refers to a process of artistic and moral self-cultivation designed to make people into better human beings. The concept of bildung holds that if a person listens to beautiful music; reads great books and poems; admires beautiful paintings, architecture, and sculpture; and so forth that eventually it will make a person into spiritually a better human being. Thus, Kessler's work in promoting the artistic avant-garde in regards to painting, sculpture, music, plays, operas and books was central to his political commitment to work for the betterment of humanity. In 1892, he visited New York, where he socialized with the richest families of New York, the so-called Four Hundred who were seen fit to be received by Caroline Schermerhorn Astor, the socialite who dominated the social life of New York. In a sign that his family was considered important, Astor invited Kessler to attend one of her parties. Astor raved about Kessler "he is a good dancer and a count!"

Kessler was familiar with many cultures, travelled widely, was active as a German diplomat, and came to be known as a man of the world and patron of the arts. He considered himself part of European society. His homosexuality, which inevitably made him an outsider, undoubtedly influenced his insight and critique of Wilhelmian culture. Kessler regarded himself as a "secret outsider", someone who was a member of the aristocratic elite of the German Empire, but at the same time did not share the heteronormative values of that elite. Like all other German homosexuals at the time, Kessler lived in fear of being convicted under Paragraph 175 of the German criminal code that banned homosexual acts in the Reich. A key element in Kessler's politics was a call for "a version of sexual liberation, of uninhibited sensuality" to create a society free of the "hypertrophy of shame" around human sexuality. Kessler was greatly heartbroken when one of his lovers, the handsome Bavarian aristocrat and officer cadet, Otto von Dungern, chose to marry in order to improve his prospects of promotion, which ended their relationship.

After moving to Berlin in 1893, he worked on the Art Nouveau journal PAN, which published literary work by, among others, Richard Dehmel, Theodor Fontane, Friedrich Nietzsche, Detlev von Liliencron, Julius Hart, Novalis, Paul Verlaine and Alfred Lichtwark. The short-lived journal also published graphic works by numerous artists including Henry van de Velde, Max Liebermann, Otto Eckmann and Ludwig von Hofmann. Kessler had become bored with European culture and in 1896 visited Mexico with the aim of broadening his cultural horizons and of finding something that would inspire him. Kessler was overwhelmed by the heat and crowds in Mexico City, but a visit to the Yucatán provided him with the inspiration he was seeking. The ruins of the lost Maya civilization fascinated him, especially the pyramids with their elaborate ornamentation and the sculptured cascades of humans, gods, snakes, jaguars and demons. Kessler was especially impressed with the ruins of an ancient civilization that was clearly not European in either origins or inspiration, which he credited with broadening his horizons. During his Mexican trip, Kessler was shocked by the violence of the regime of Mexico's dictator, President Porfirio Díaz, whose police force, the Rurales routinely engaged in extreme violence against people of Mexico. Kessler was also disturbed by the uniforms of the Porfiriato-era Mexico, which were clearly modelled after those of Imperial Germany right down to the Pickelhaube spiked helmets wore by high officials of Diaz's regime. Kessler drew a contrast between the colorful street life of Mexico full of vibrancy and generally friendly people vs. the "depravity" of the Porfiriato state. Kessler was troubled by the sight of the Rurales dragging down the streets the mutilated bodies of those who were "shot while trying to escape" (the standard euphemism for an extrajudicial execution).

On 24 March 1903, Kessler assumed control of the "Museum für Kunst und Kunstgewerbe" in Weimar. There he worked with new exhibition concepts and the establishment of a permanent arts and crafts exhibit. In 1904, during his work in Weimar, Kessler began to publish a group of bibliophilic books containing artistic compositions of typography and illustrations. In the beginning he cooperated with the German Insel Verlag.

In 1903, Kessler launched the Deutscher Künstlerbund and became its vice-president. The consortium supported less acknowledged artists including Edvard Munch, Johannes R. Becher, Detlev von Liliencron and the painters of Die Brücke. Kessler used his wealth to serve as the patron of the French sculptor Aristide Maillol, who became a close friend. Through Maillol, Kessler met one of his models, the French cyclist Gaston Colin who became Kessler's lover. The Dutch art historian Jaap Harskamp noted it took much effort on the part of Kessler to have the "firmly heterosexual" Maillol do a nude sculpture of Colin.

In 1906, an exhibition commotion gave reason to depose Kessler from his office. An exhibition of drawings at the Grand Ducal Museum by Rodin and dedicated, in error, to the Grand Duke of Sax Thuringia, was considered as a risk to the wives and daughters of Weimar. The Grand Duke was considered to be a "philistine" who was encouraged in his hostility to Kessler's artistic projects by the Emperor Wilhelm II who "loathed all innovative art". One of the Rodin drawings at Kessler's exhibition, a squatting female nude with her buttocks prominently exposed, was presented as an insult to the Grand Duke and all German royalty in general. This was followed by a smear campaign that Kessler considered to be an intrigue by Aimé Charles Vincent von Palezieux, retired Prussian General and court Marshall in Weimar, but which led to Kessler's resignation. Palezieux died less than a year later on 10 February 1907 just before receipt of a challenge to a duel from Kessler.

About the Eulenburg affair sex scandal that rocked Germany in 1906-1908 when the best friend of the Kaiser Wilhelm II, Prince Philip von Eulenburg was exposed as gay, Kessler wrote in his diary that the scandal demonstrated how dangerous it was to be gay as the careers of even most highly placed homosexuals such as the Kaiser's favorite courtier, best friend and closest adviser could be destroyed if their sexuality came to public notice. However, Kessler believed that the scandal, however unfortunate it was to Eulenburg, would ultimately lead to greater public tolerance for gay people. Kessler predicated in his diary: "Around 1920 we—which is not the case today—will hold the record in pederasty, like Sparta in Greece."

Around 1909, Kessler helped Hugo von Hofmannsthal to develop the outline of a comic opera, which would later come to be called Der Rosenkavalier. Richard Strauss composed the music (but also demanded various changes in the plot). Der Rosenkavalier premiered in Dresden in 1911 under the baton of Ernst von Schuch. Kessler hoped to be named as a co-author of the libretto, but Hofmannsthal merely mentioned him in the dedication.

In 1913 Kessler founded his own company, the Cranach Press, of which he became the director. Around 1913, Kessler commissioned Edward Gordon Craig, an English theatrical designer and theoretician, to make woodcut illustrations for a sumptuous edition of Shakespeare's Hamlet for the Cranach Press. A German translation by Gerhart Hauptmann, with illustrations by Craig, was finally published in Weimar in 1928. The English version, edited by J. Dover Wilson, came out in 1930. This book, printed on fine paper, using different type-faces, with marginal notes with source quotations, and featuring Craig's woodcuts, is regarded by many as one of the finest examples of the printer's art to have been published in the 20th century. It is still sought by collectors worldwide.

Kessler's ideas of reforming culture went beyond the visual arts. He developed a reformation concept for the theatre which was supported by Edward Gordon Craig, Max Reinhardt and Karl Vollmöller. Kessler asserted that a so-called "Mustertheater" should be established. The Belgian architect Henry van de Velde sought to design the corresponding building. On the initiative of Kessler, many prominent writers were invited to introduce a literary modernity to Weimar, but the hegemonic opinions were considered too conservative and nationalistic, and the plans for the Mustertheater failed.

During his Weimar period Kessler became close friends with Elisabeth Förster-Nietzsche (1846–1935), the sister of late Friedrich Nietzsche. At the suggestion of Kessler, she chose Weimar as domicile for the Nietzsche Archive.

== Later years ==
Kessler saw active service on the Eastern Front and the Western Front during World War I. In 1914, Kessler was caught up in the "spirit of 1914" and supported his country's war effort. He served as part of the German contingent sent to the Austrian province of Galicia (modern southeastern Poland and western Ukraine) to aid the Austrians following their disastrous defeat at the hands of Russians in September 1914. From fall of 1914 until early 1916, Kessler served in Galicia where he found love with an young staff officer Schoeter. In 1915, during the siege of Przemsyl, Kessler was dispatched to Berlin to ask the chancellor, Theobald von Bethmann Hollweg, to pressure the chief of the Great General Staff, General Erich von Falkenhayn, to send troops to help relieve Przemyśl before it fell to the Russians. Kessler wrote in his diary: "He has become since I last saw him last, heavier, slower and more tired, a weary colossus". Kessler was a supporter of the duumvirate of Field Marshal Paul von Hindenburg and General Erich Ludendorff, whom he was convinced were the duo capable of winning the war for Germany. He was an "Easterner" who supported the Hindenburg-Ludendorff strategy of defeating Russia before turning west, and was highly critical of Falkenhayn's preference for defeating France first before turning east. Likewise, Kessler regarded the Kaiser, Wilhelm II, as a weak leader who kept Falkenhayn on as a chief of staff despite his lack of success. Initially, he was annexationist who wanted the war to end with Germany annexing Belgium, Russian Poland, and various African colonies belonging to the Allies, which led him to support the maximum total war strategy endorsed by Hindenburg and Ludendorff as the only way to defeat the British empire.

In the spring of 1915, Kessler described the war in Galicia as "an almost enjoyable adventure" and described his Galician service as a "Cook's tour" through an exotic and unfamiliar part of Europe. Kessler was fascinated by Galicia, the most populous province in the Austrian empire as well being one of the most poorest and backward parts of Europe whose rural population essentially lived a medieval lifestyle. However, despite his support for the war, Kessler stayed in contact with his sister married to a French marquis and sent money to her via Switzerland to support Colin's family now that he was serving in the French Army. Kessler was able to send a considerable amount of financial support to Colin via neutral Switzerland. Oblivious to the war, Kessler asked his sisters to ensure that Edward Johnson, John Mason and Emery Walker, the three English printers whom he hired before the war to print his edition of Hamlet for the Cranach Press continued to be paid for their work as Kessler wanted to see Hamlet published as soon as possible, notwithstanding the war. In April 1915, Kessler and Schoeter spend their days swimming naked, riding naked on horses and running around nude across the meadows, apparently not concerned what others might think of them. Kessler noted that Galicia was a polyglot region with 11 different peoples living there, through the Poles, Ukrainians and Jews were the three largest groups. He described the Ukrainian peasants as beautiful while in a rare outburst of anti-Semitism called the Jews of Galicia "louses" who exploited the local Christian population. On 2 May 1915, a German offensive was opened against the Russians. Kessler wrote about seeing the corpses on the battlefield with their faces "already half rotten and covered with dirt and earth". Between 22 and 29 June 1915, his unit attempted to cross the Dniester river, leading Kessler in his diary to complain about the stubborn and fierce Russian resistance in spite of the superior firepower of the Germans. In October 1915, Kessler met the future leader of Poland, Józef Piłsudski, who was serving with the Polish Legion with the Austrian Army in Galicia. After having a long conversation with him in French, Kessler wrote in his diary that he had "thoughtful eyes". Kessler supported the concept of a sham independent Poland to be carved out of Russian Poland with Germany occupying certain strategic points along with having control of the railroads. Kessler wrote in his diary provided that the Poles were willing to accept these conditions, he supported "giving the Poles every freedom, even political".

Kessler served at the Battle of Verdun in 1916, and was discharged from the Prussian Army later that year under the grounds of "shell shock" that rendered him unfit for further military service. Unlike the campaign in Galicia, it pained Kessler to be fighting at Verdun against one of his "three homelands" (the other two being Britain and Germany), and the knowledge that his former lover Colin was serving at Verdun increased his angst. In his diary, Kessler wrote about the heavy losses the Germans had endured at Verdun in what he described as "pointless" attacks that shook his confidence in the German Army. The equally heavy losses taken by the French also haunted him as France was one of his "three homelands". Increasingly, Kessler came to perceive the war as a catastrophe. Kessler found himself cut off from seeing his beloved sister who was married to a French nobleman. Likewise, Kessler found himself cut off from his circles of friends in Britain and France, and he came to feel that the war had fractured his life by severing him from his friends abroad. On 20 May 1916, Kessler was honorably discharged from the Prussian Army as unsuitable for further military service following a doctor's report that Verdun had psychologically broken him. Kessler's association with the Angolphile Prince Max von Lichnowsky, the former German ambassador to the United Kingdom, did not help his military career. Lichnowsky had scandalized his countrymen in 1916 by publishing a private memo, intended to be circulated only amongst his friends which soon made its way to neutral Sweden and hence the world press, that blamed his government for the war and acquitted Britain of the charge of "war guilt".

During World War I, Kessler and Karl Gustav Vollmoeller worked together at the German Embassy in Bern for the cultural department of the Foreign Office. They developed activities aimed at peace plans with France and England. In February 1918, he returned to Warsaw, inspiring him to write in his diary: "We in the West are too predetermined and bourgeois. Here all possibilities-Jewish, German, Slavic, Asiatic-are open. If I had come to Warsaw instead of Bern in 1916, I would have fulfilled my mission better". Towards the end of the war, Kessler was assigned the task of freeing Piłsudski from the German prison he placed in following his refusal to swear loyalty to the Reich in 1916. The Polish government in exile based in Paris led by Roman Dmowski had recognized by Britain, France and the United States, and was expecting to arrive in Poland once the Allies won the war. The Germans had freed Piłsudski and allowed him to form a government in Warsaw in opportunistic gesture intended to inspire discord between the two rival Polish governments based in Warsaw and Paris out of the hope of avoiding territorial losses to Poland. In November 1918, Kessler was German Ambassador to Warsaw in the newly independent Poland (Second Polish Republic). Kessler was appointed ambassador to Poland largely because of his friendship with Piłsudski. On 19 November 1918, Kessler arrived in Warsaw. His main mission was to prevent Germany from losing any territory to Poland as the newly created Polish state laid claim to Danzig (modern Gdańsk), West Prussia, Posen (modern Poznań), Upper Silesia and parts of East Prussia, a mission that Kessler privately admitted was impossible. The German occupation of Warsaw had made the Reich unpopular with the Varsovians as Kessler discovered as soon discovered as he arrived in Warsaw. Kessler found himself the object of much unpopularity and had to request a military guard from Piłsudski for his safety. Wojciech Korfanty, the Polish leader in Upper Silesia, gave an anti-German speech outside of Kessler's apartment, which inspired a mob to try to storm the apartment.

In December 1918, he returned to his estate in Weimar, recording that although the house seemed unchanged from 1913 and his old servants and pets greeted him with affection, his collections of paintings, statues, books and mementos reflected a European intellectual and cultural community which was now "dead, missing, scattered .. or become enemies". In December 1918, he visited the former Imperial Palace in Berlin, which had been looted by the mutinous sailors of the High Seas Fleet who had just staged the November Revolution that had toppled the ancient House of Hohenzollern along with the rest of Germany's royal families. Kessler wrote in his diary after viewing the looted palace: "“But these private apartments, the furniture, the articles of everyday use...are so insipid and tasteless, so philistine, that it is difficult to feel much indignation against the pilferers. Only astonishment that the wretched, timid, unimaginative creatures who liked this trash, and frittered away their life in this precious palatial haven, amidst lackeys and sycophants, could ever make any impact on history.” Writing about the former Emperor, Wilhelm II, a man whom he always disliked, Kessler called him: "this nincompoop and swaggerer who plunged Germany into misfortune...Not a facet of him is capable of arousing pity or sympathy."

In 1919, he wrote a "plan for a League of Nations on the basis of an organization of organizations (World Organisation)", which contains the constitution of such an international confederation of states. The purpose of this covenant was above all to prevent new wars, securing human rights and the regulation of world trade. Main body of this covenant would be the "World Council", which also elected an executive committee. Under his plan a Weltjustizhof, a World Court of Arbitration and administrative authorities would be built. This ordered by paragraphs plan had the form of a state constitution. Another plan for a supranational organisation he developed in 1920 as "Guidelines for a true League of Nations" in the form of a resolution. In 1922, he served for a short time as the President of the German Peace Society, of which he was a member from 1919 to 1929. Kessler's very public support for the Weimar Republic made him into a pariah amongst the former elite circles he had once frequented as the aristocracy, the officer corps and the former members of the elite university fraternities that he once belonged to all ostracized him. However, Kessler met and was actively engaged in correspondence with a number of leading figures in Europe such as Albert Einstein, André Gide, Jean Cocteau, Virginia Woolf, Marcel Proust, George Bernard Shaw, Isadora Duncan, and Josephine Baker.

In the 1920s, Kessler as a journalist tried to influence the political debates of the Weimar Republic. He wrote essays on different social and foreign policy issues, such as socialism, or the League of Nations. He belonged to the left-liberal German Democratic Party (DDP) and wrote a biography of his 1922 murdered friend Walther Rathenau (then Foreign minister). In 1924, he was a DDP candidate for the Reichstag. When this attempt failed, he withdrew from politics. In the twenties, Kessler was frequently a guest at the Berlin SeSiSo Club. In 1932/33, material co-edited by him appeared in the magazine Das Freie Wort (The Free Word). In his diary, Kessler wrote about the Nazis: "“it is difficult to say which feeling is stronger, loathing or pity, for these brainless, malevolent creatures.".

After the Nazis' seizure of power in 1933, Kessler resigned and emigrated to Paris, then to Mallorca and finally to the southern French provinces. Kessler was openly gay, and he feared for his future in Nazi Germany. The Canadian historian Michael Kater wrote that Kessler's status as a very wealthy aristocrat might have protected him in the Third Reich despite his sexuality, but he was not willing to take the chance. From his exile, he became critical of recent German history. In 1935, he wrote by the early years of the 20th century the German middle class had become so "Bismarckian" in their political views that "a lethal atmosphere" had been created to such an extent that anyone who had any views that were even remotely critical of the state that Bismarck had created was a pariah. Kessler wrote that this extreme idolization of Bismarck as a super-human, larger-than-life leader whose legacy was not to be questioned even in the slightest had a stifling effect in Germany as it led to a mindless reverence for the Prussian-German state as it currently existed. Kessler was hurt by the news that his former lover, Dungern, had become a Nazi functionary in Berlin and was now denying that he had even known him. Kessler died in 1937 in Lyon.

It was presumed that Kessler's earlier diaries had been lost but they were found in 1983 in a safe in Mallorca. In 2004, the first definitive nine volume edition was published in Germany and the first English edition of the 1880–1918 years was published in 2011.

== Books ==
- Easton, Laird M. (2006). The Red Count : The Life and Times of Harry Kessler. Los Angeles: University of California Press. ISBN 978-0-520-24817-5.
- Gerwarth, Robert (2005). The Bismarck Myth Weimar Germany and the Legacy of the Iron Chancellor. Oxford: Clarendon Press. ISBN 9780199281848.
- Kater, Michael (2019). Culture in Nazi Germany. New Haven: Yale University Press. ISBN 9780300211412.

== Works by Graf Kessler ==
- Gesammelte Schriften in drei Bänden ISBN 359625678X
  - Vol 1: Gesichter und Zeiten
  - Vol 2: Notizen über Mexiko
  - Vol 3: Erinnerungen
- Das Tagebuch 1880–1937
  - Vol. 2: 1892–1897 ISBN 376819812X
  - Vol. 3: 1897–1905 ISBN 3768198138
  - Vol. 4: 1906–1914 ISBN 3768198146
  - Vol. 5: 1914–1916 ISBN 3768198154
  - Vol. 6: 1916–1918 ISBN 3768198162
  - Vol. 7: 1919–1923 ISBN 3768198170
  - Vol. 8: 1923–1926 ISBN 3768198189
  - Vol. 9: 1926–1937 ISBN 3768198197
