= H. F. B. Lynch =

British traveller, businessman and politician

Henry Finnis Blosse Lynch

Member of Parliament for Ripon
- In office 1906–1910

Personal details
- Born: 18 April 1862 London
- Died: 24 November 1913 (aged 51) Calais, France

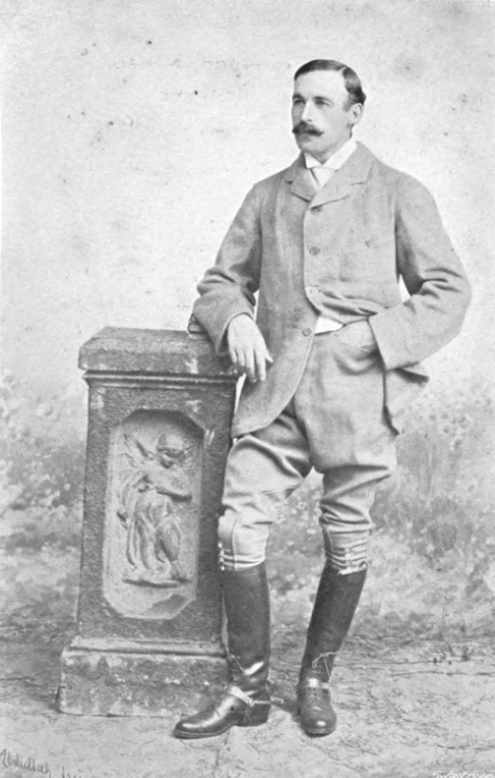

Henry Finnis Blosse Lynch, MA, FRGS (18 April 1862 – 24 November 1913) was a British traveller, businessman, and Liberal Member of Parliament.

== Biography ==
Lynch was the only son of the Mesopotamian explorer Thomas Kerr Lynch, of a landed Irish family based at Partry House, County Mayo, and Harriet Taylor, the daughter of Colonel Robert Taylor, a British political resident at Baghdad, and his Armenian wife. The Armenian ethnicity of his maternal grandfather may have played a role in his interest in Armenia. The explorer Henry Blosse Lynch was his uncle. He was born in London and educated at Eton College, the University of Heidelberg, and Trinity College, Cambridge, where he studied classics. Although called to the bar from the Middle Temple in 1887, he eschewed a career in law in favour of working for his family business, Lynch Brothers, a commercial firm founded in Baghdad in 1841 which exported goods from Britain to Mesopotamia. He became the company's chairman in 1896.

Lynch was admitted as a freeman of the Worshipful Company of Bowyers of the City of London in 1888.

Lynch was elected at the 1906 general election as Member of Parliament (MP) for Ripon, but was defeated at the January 1910 general election. He contested Gloucester in the December 1910 general election, but lost by 4 votes (3903 to 3899).

Lynch died, unmarried, of pneumonia in a hotel in Calais in 1913. He left half of his estate to Trinity College. He also bequeathed a large number of Middle Eastern artefacts to the British Museum. Photographs by Lynch are held by the British Library and in the Conway Library at The Courtauld Institute of Art whose archive, of primarily architectural images, is being digitised under the wider Courtauld Connects project.

== Travels to Armenia ==
Lynch wrote a two-volume book on his travels to Russian Armenia and Turkish Armenia in 1893 and 1898, respectively. It was published in 1901. Lynch's travelogue combines factual documentation with artistic expression. He provided valuable archival documentation of Armenian heritage (some now lost or damaged).

=== Reception ===
David George Hogarth, reviewed it for the journal Man, calling it a "magnificently printed and illustrated mixture of travel notes and impressions, historical and archaeological research, political ratiocination, and geographical information." Another reviewer, Charles William Wilson, wrote in The Geographical Journal that while it is "full of information, but from a geographical point of view, it is somewhat disappointing. In the descriptions of scenery there is occasionally such a flow of words that the reader is apt to be wearied and lose the impression which the writer intends to convey."

It continued to be praised in subsequent decades. Martin Conway described it in 1916 as a "classical work on the country" and added that his "journeys in Armenia and close study of the country made him beyond question the greatest recent authority upon it." Charles Dowsett called it, in 1962, the "best book by an Englishman on any aspect of Armenian studies." Jean-Michel Thierry wrote in 1987 that the publication, "with its lively style, good documentation, abundant illustrations, enjoyed the considerable success it deserved." Christina Maranci noted that Lynch's travel contain the "first modern western study of Armenian architecture" and suggested that he "deserves much more attention than he has yet received." In 1993, Vrej Nersessian described the two volumes as "an erudite composition still valuable for its encyclopaedic nature as well as being the standard work on the Armenians c. 1900." Nersessian noted that the book "affords a view of Armenia before its great political, ideological, sociological, industrial and demographic changes."

Parliament of the United Kingdom
Preceded by John Lloyd Wharton	Member of Parliament for Ripon; 1906 – January 1910	Succeeded by Edward Wood
