= Aodh Ua Goirmghiallaigh =

Irish regional king (d. 1206)

Aodh Ua Goirmghiallaigh, King of Partraige Cera, died 1206.

Ua Goirmghiallaigh was king of an Irish population-group called the Partraige, sometimes said to be of pre-Gaelic origins. Ua Goirmghiallaigh's branch of the Partraige were located around Lough Carra in what is now County Mayo, and have given their name to the parish of Partry and the Partry Mountains. Ua Goirmghiallaigh is notable as almost the only member of the Partraige to occur in any of the extant Irish annals, which refer to his death by the Men of Cera in 1206. Nollaig Ó Muraíle believes this to refer to the Uí Fiachrach branch of the Cera, and not the Partraige Cera themselves.

The Book of Lecan states that Ua Goirmghiallaigh, with Ua Dorchaidhe, were co-chiefs of Partraige Cera. A branch of the latter family settled in Galway c. 1488, becoming one of The Tribes of Galway. One of their most famous members was the Irish Confederate, Patrick D'Arcy (1598–1668).

Ó Goirmghiallaigh is now rendered in English as Gormally.
