= Dominick Browne =

Dominick Browne may refer to:

- Sir Dominick Browne (c. 1585–c. 1656) Irish merchant and landowner
- Dominick Browne (mayor), mayor of Galway (1688–1689)
- Dominick Browne, 1st Baron Oranmore and Browne (1787–1860), Irish politician
- Dominick Browne, 4th Baron Oranmore and Browne (1901–2002), Anglo-Irish politician
