= Geoffrey Browne (MP) =

Geoffrey Browne (died 14 January 1668) was an Irish lawyer and politician.

Browne was a son of Sir Dominick Browne and Anastasia Darcy, both members of the Tribes of Galway. He was a nephew to Patrick D'Arcy (1598–1668), the Confederate lawyer who wrote the constitution of Confederate Ireland, and son-in-law of Sir Henry Lynch, 1st Baronet, agent to Richard Burke, 4th Earl of Clanricarde.

In 1640 he was elected M.P. for Athenry and was actively involved in the parliament's affairs in the period leading up to the Irish Rebellion of 1641, including one to England in late 1640.

On the outbreak of hostilities in Connacht, he returned to Galway, becoming involved with figures such as Patrick D'Arcy, Richard Martyn, Ulick Burke, 1st Marquess of Clanricarde and Walter Lynch (mayor). He became a member of the first Supreme Council in November 1642, and a member of each successive one until February 1646. He was a principal figure in the negotiations between the Confederates and James Butler, 1st Duke of Ormonde, and a direct negotiator with Charles I in 1644. He was regarded as a leading member of the confederate peace party and involved in friction with papal nuncio, Giovanni Battista Rinuccini.

Arriving in Paris in March 1648, Browne co-operated with a now exiled Ormond in an effort to lay aside religious differences and discussions, which allowed the later to return to Ireland as crown negotiator. Ormond named him as an agent to treat with Charles, Duke of Lorraine, who had offered the confederates aid against the English parliament. He reached Brussels on 12 June 1651 and had signed a treaty on 12 July, one which was however rejected by Clanricarde.

His life after his return to Ireland in 1651 is unclear. On 12 August 1652 he was named as exempt from pardon for life and estate by the Parliamentarians, and may have been in London in May 1653. He was M.P. for Tuam in 1661, its only Catholic, but was unseated by the commons.

By his wife, Mary Lynch, he had four sons and one daughter. His senior male descendants became Baron Oranmore and Browne.
