= James Riabhach Darcy =

Mayor of Galway

James Riabhach Darcy was Mayor of Galway in Ireland 1602–1603.

== Life ==
Darcy was a member of the Tribes of Galway, and the first of his family to become Mayor. The family originally humble farmers from Pártraí, County Mayo, who moved to Galway in the 1480s. Darcy's ancestor, Walter Riabhac Ó Dorchaidhe (fl. c. 1488), was of the Partraige of Lough Carra. Walter Riabhach is believed to have settled in Galway sometime in the mid-15th century. Dubhaltach MacFhirbhisigh states that this Walter Riabhach was"the first man of the Uí Dorchaidhe who came to Galway, according to the Galweigians themselves".

Darcy was at one point vice-president of Connacht

By his first marriage to a Miss Bodkin, he fathered Nicholas, Martin, James, Anthony and Anastace. With Elizabeth Martyn he had Andrew and Patrick. Elizabeth Martyn was a granddaughter of William Óge Martyn, and an aunt of Richard Martyn, who would later become brother-in-law and legal partner of Patrick Darcy.

He died towards the end of his term, and was replaced in office by Christopher Lynch, who had been his predecessor. His descendants included Patrick D'Arcy and John D'Arcy, the founder of Clifden.

Civic offices
Preceded by Christopher Lynch	Mayor of Galway; September 1602– June 1603	Succeeded by Christopher Lynch
