= Ludwig von Hofmann =

German painter (1861–1945)

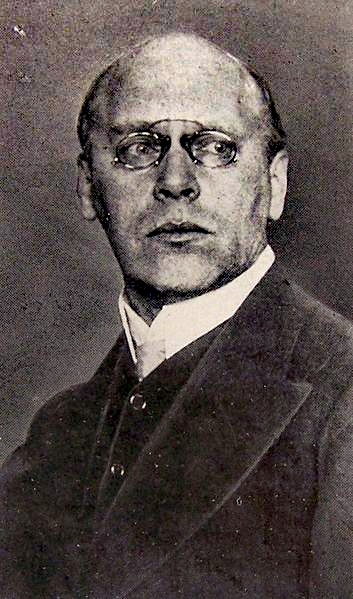
Ludwig von Hofmann c. 1910

Ludwig von Hofmann (17 August 1861 – 23 August 1945) was a German painter, graphic artist and designer. He worked in a combination of the Art Nouveau and Symbolist styles. His work was part of the painting event in the art competition at the 1928 Summer Olympics.

== Biography ==
He was born in Darmstadt. His father was the Prussian statesman Karl von Hofmann, who served as Minister-president of the Grand Duchy of Hesse from 1872 to 1876 and was briefly Trade Minister in the cabinet of Otto von Bismarck.

Ludwig began his studies in 1883 at the Dresden Academy of Fine Arts, then studied with Ferdinand Keller at the Academy of Fine Arts, Karlsruhe. In 1889, he attended the Académie Julian in Paris, where he came under the influence of Pierre Puvis de Chavannes and Paul-Albert Besnard.

After 1890, he was a freelance painter in Berlin. From 1894 to 1900, he travelled extensively and spent a great deal of his time at his villa in Fiesole. His appreciation of antiquity and attraction to the idea of Arcadia permeates much of his work. After 1895, he was a regular contributor of illustrations for the Art Nouveau magazine Pan. In 1896, he became a member of the Berlin Secession and he was married in 1899. He was also a member of the Deutscher Künstlerbund

In 1903, he was appointed a professor at the Weimar Saxon Grand Ducal Art School, where he became a member of the avant-garde literary and artistic group centered around Harry Graf Kessler. Jean Arp and Ivo Hauptmann were among his students. In 1916, he was named a professor at the academy in Dresden, where he remained until 1931. He also provided illustrations for a new translation of the Odyssey by Leopold Ziegler and works by Gerhart Hauptmann (Ivo's father).

His overall production slackened in the 1930s and, in 1937, some of his works were labeled as "degenerate art". He retired to Pillnitz, near Dresden, where he died in 1945. His remaining works were almost confiscated by the Russians after the war, but his widow managed to save them.

== Selected paintings ==
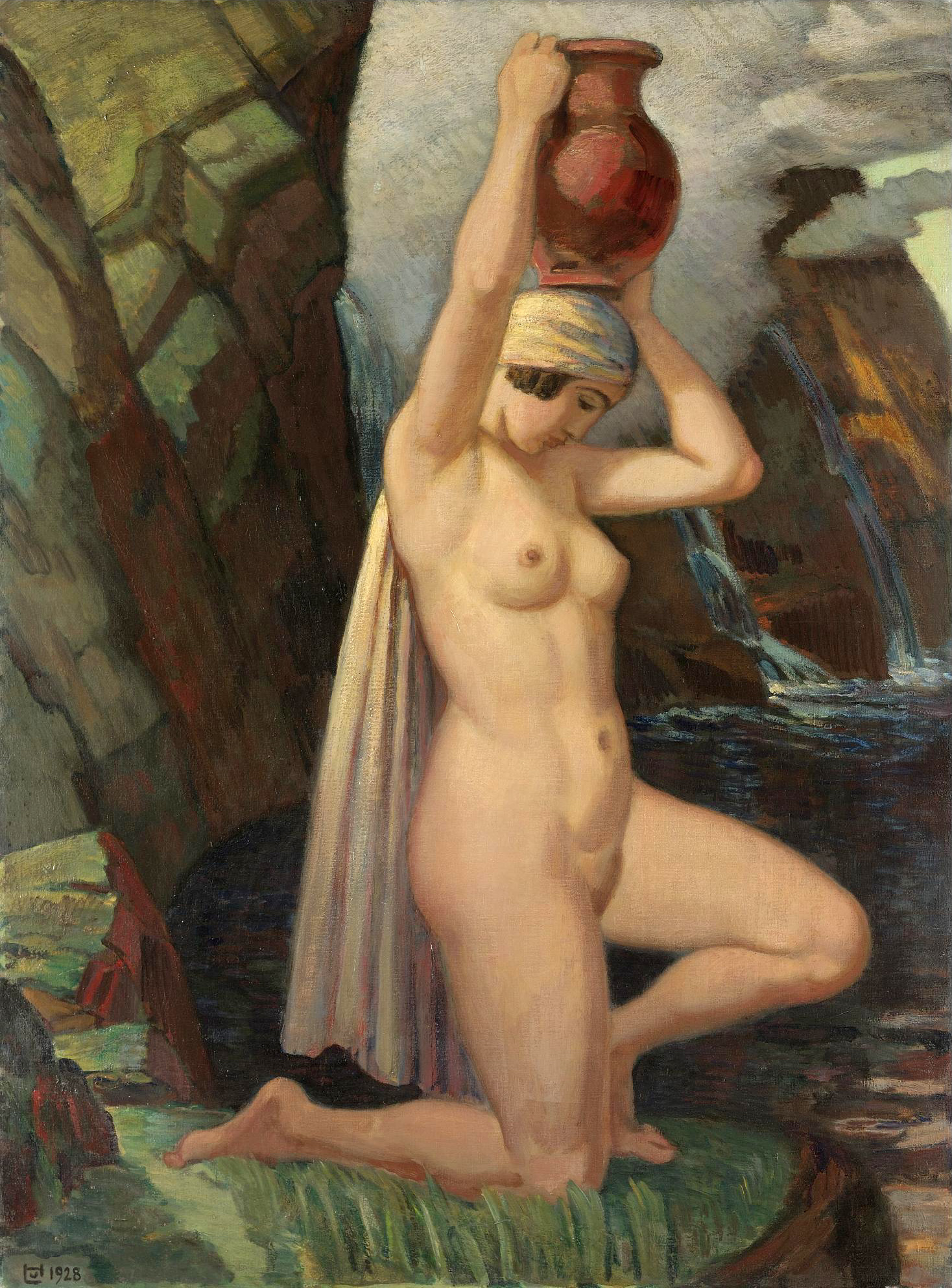
Kneeling Woman with Jug

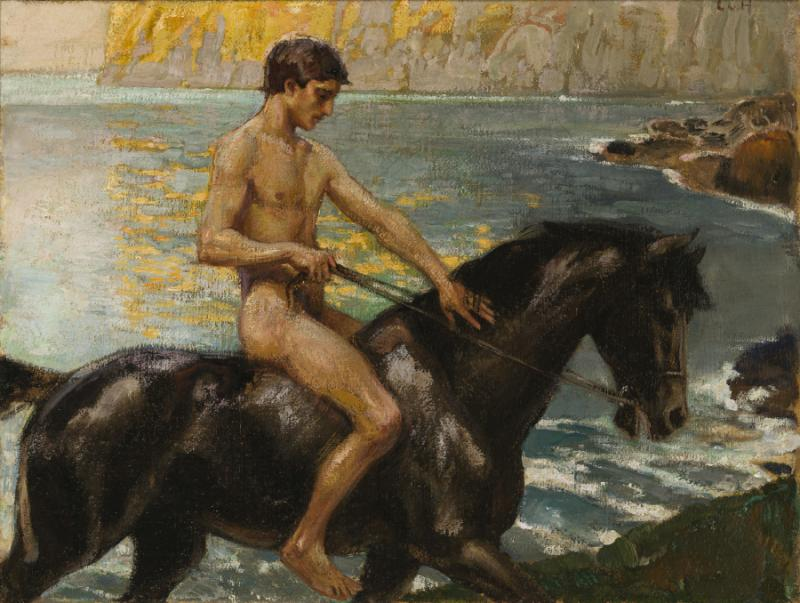
Rider on the Beach

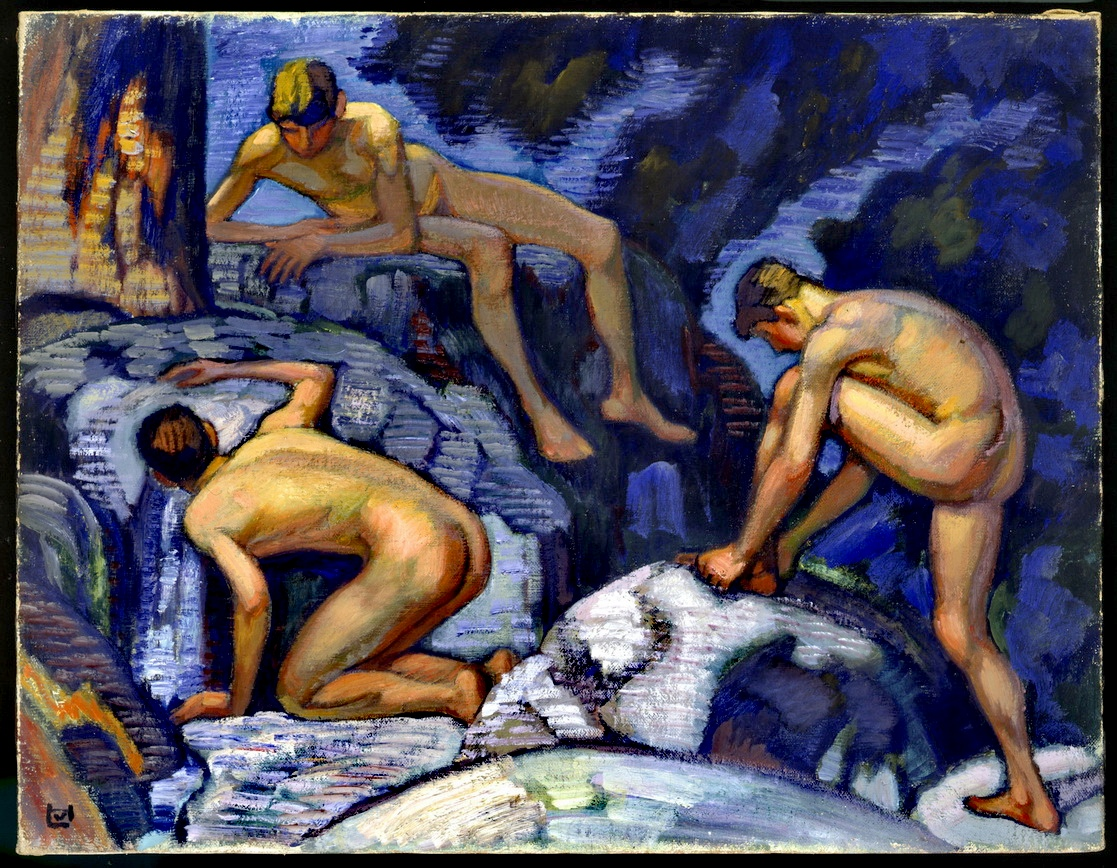
The Spring

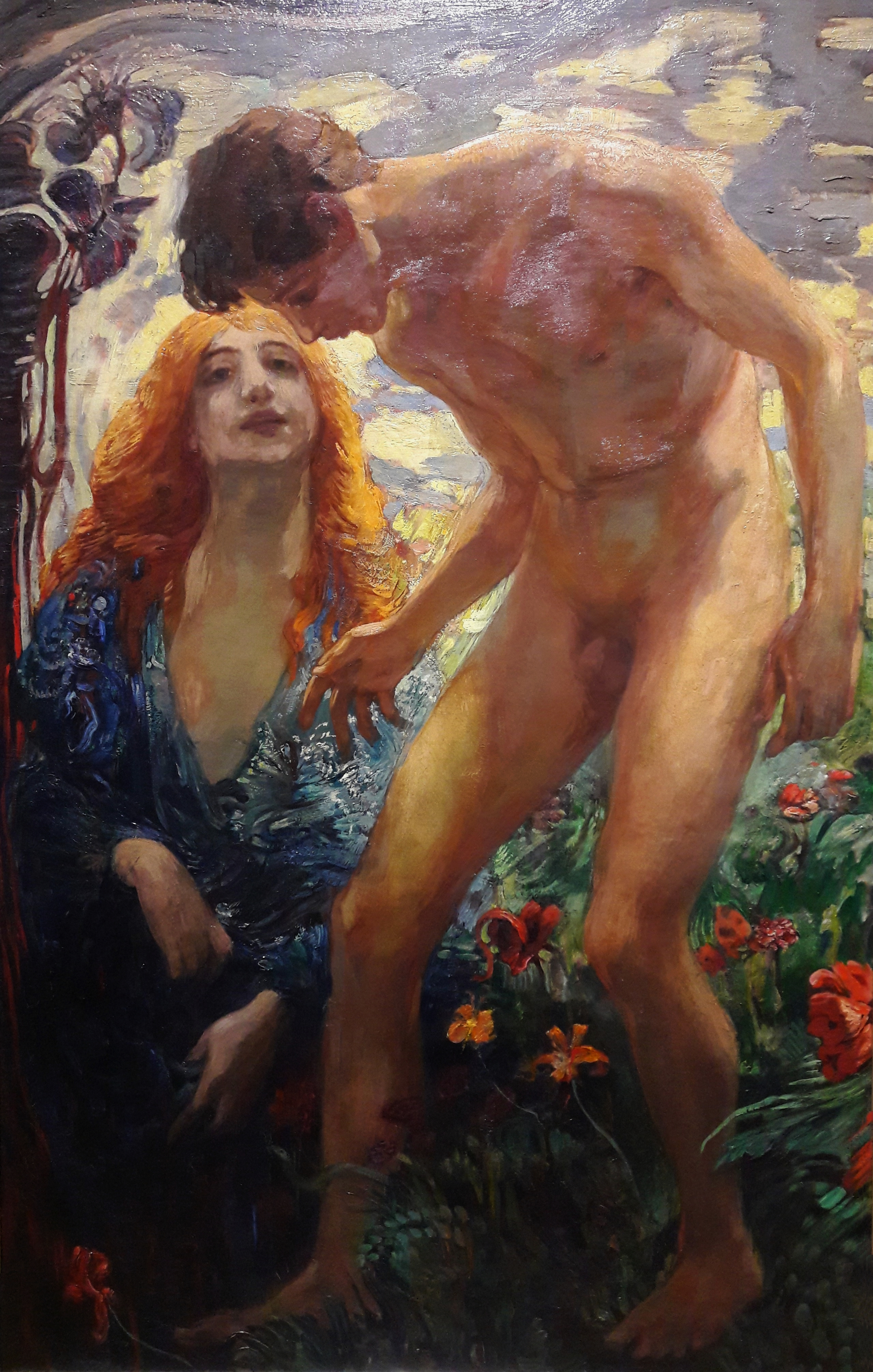
Narcissus

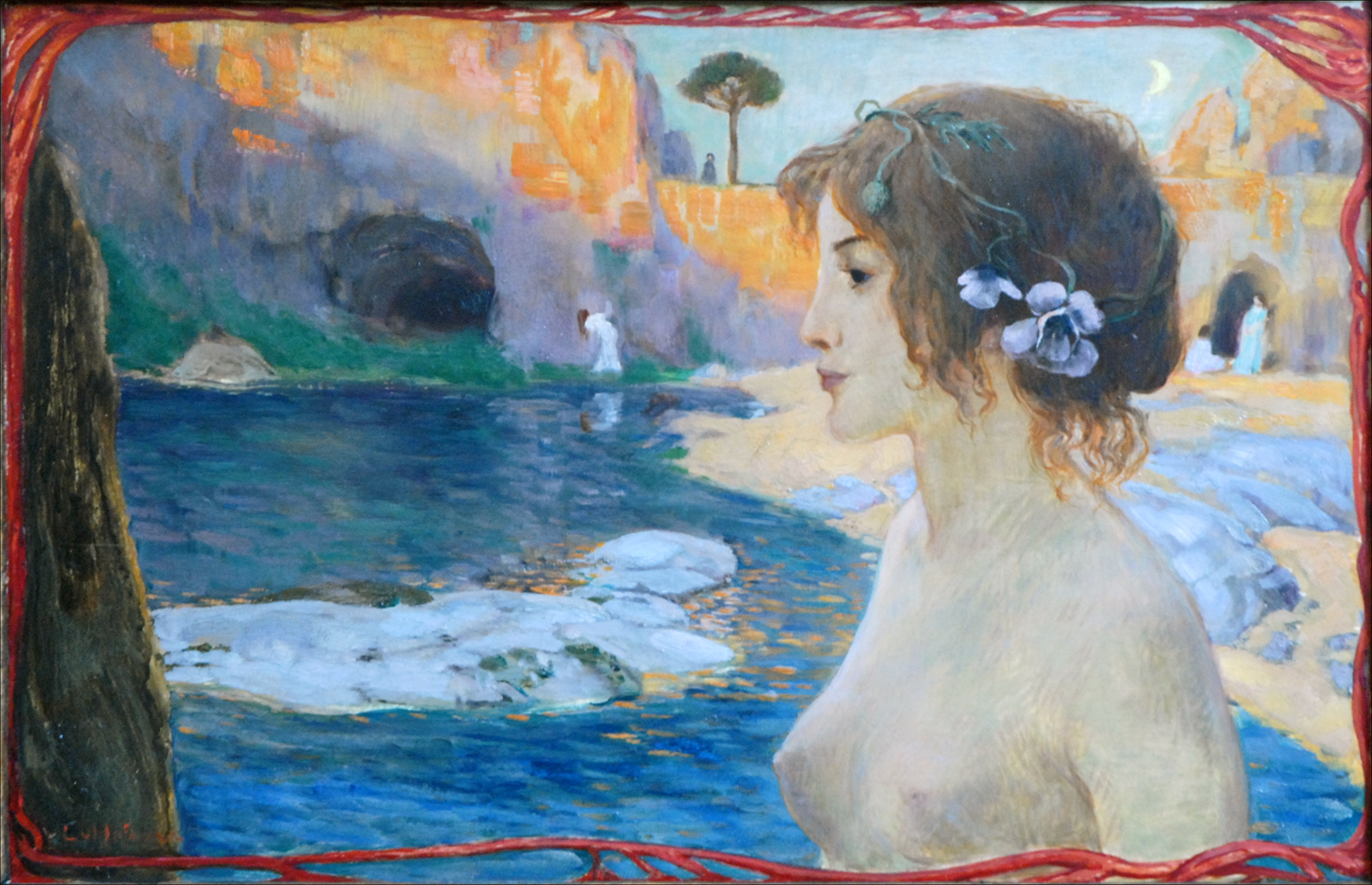
Daydream
