= Sir Dominick Browne =

Irish merchant and politician (c. 1585 - c. 1656)

Sir Dominick Browne was an Irish merchant and landowner, c. 1585 – c. 1656.

== Biography ==
Browne was the eldest of three sons of Geoffrey Browne, alderman of Galway (died 1608), a member of the Tribes of Galway.

He was of age and married at the time of his father's death, and a town bailiff in 1609. He was convicted for felony and homicide of Henry Rany of Galway, at Athenry on 29 July 1620. However, for the sum of £5.00 he was pardoned that December.

He successfully stood as an M.P. for Athenry in the 1634 Irish parliament. In the same year he was elected Mayor of Galway. In 1635 he was knighted by Thomas Wentworth, 1st Earl of Strafford. In 1636 he was noted as holding half the lands of Mayo Abbey in addition to other land in the baronies of Costello, Gallen and Clanmorris. Two of his sons were made Freemen of Galway in 1641.

His activities during the Irish Confederate Wars are uncertain. In 1653 he was dispossessed of his Galway property, but permitted to retain a portion of his lands in Mayo.

He was married to Anastasia Darcy, a daughter of James Riabhach Darcy (died 1603). Via his son, Geoffrey Browne, M.P. (died 1668) and grandson Dominick Browne, he was ancestor of Baron Oranmore and Browne, Garech Browne and Tara Browne.

Civic offices
Preceded by Patrick French	Mayor of Galway; September 1634 – September 1635	Succeeded by Nicholas More Lynch fitz Marcus
