= Burriscarra Abbey =

Carmelite priory in County Mayo, Ireland

- Mainistir Bhuiríos Ceara
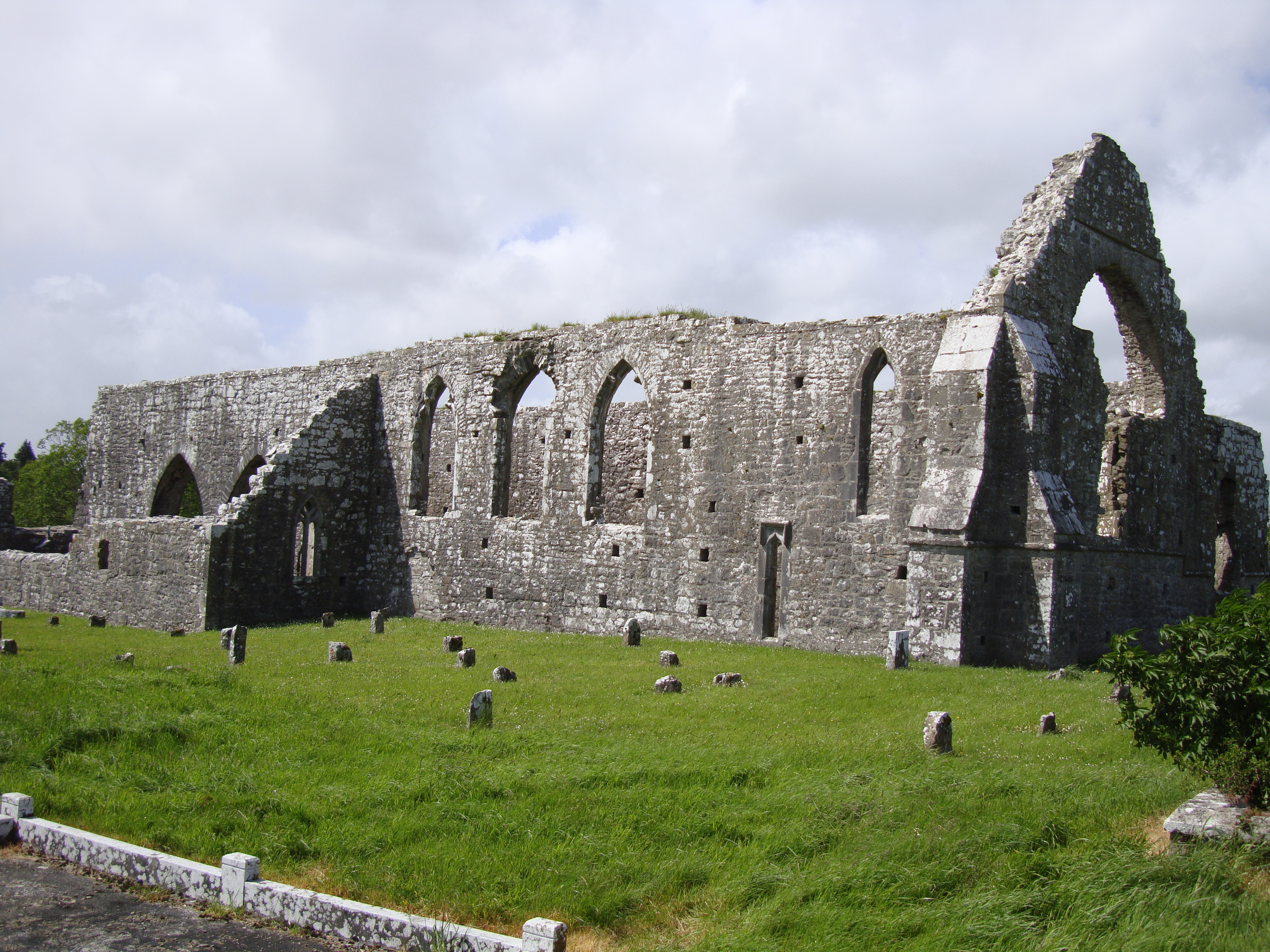

- Location within Ireland
- Interactive map of Burriscarra Abbey

Monastery information
- Other name: Buirghes-ceinn-trachta
- Order: Carmelites; Order of Saint Augustine
- Established: 1298
- Disestablished: 1607
- Diocese: Tuam

People
- Founder: Adam de Staunton

Architecture
- Status: ruined
- Style: Norman

Site
- Location: Castlecarra, Carnacon, County Mayo
- Coordinates: 53.730929°N 9.245740°W
- Visible remains: Friary and church
- Public access: Yes

Burriscarra Abbey is a former Carmelite Priory and National Monument located in County Mayo, Ireland.

== Location ==
Burriscarra Abbey is located 1.6 km (1 mile) west of Carnacon, on the northeast of Lough Carra.

== History ==
Adam de Staunton, whose family later assumed the name MacEvilly (Mac Mhilidh) founded the Abbey c. 1298 for the Carmelites.

The abbey was abandoned before 1383 and in 1413 it was transferred by Pope Gregory XII to the Order of Saint Augustine who already had a friary in Ballinrobe. It was burned in 1430 but repaired soon after. It was usurped by the Cromwellians and in 1607 James I granted the land to John King, who sold it to Oliver Bowen in 1608. Later Charles II granted it to John King and then Sir Henry Lynch whose family kept it until the 19th century. It now belongs to the Office of Public Works who restored it in the 1960s.

The current remains are largely of the 15th century.

== Building ==
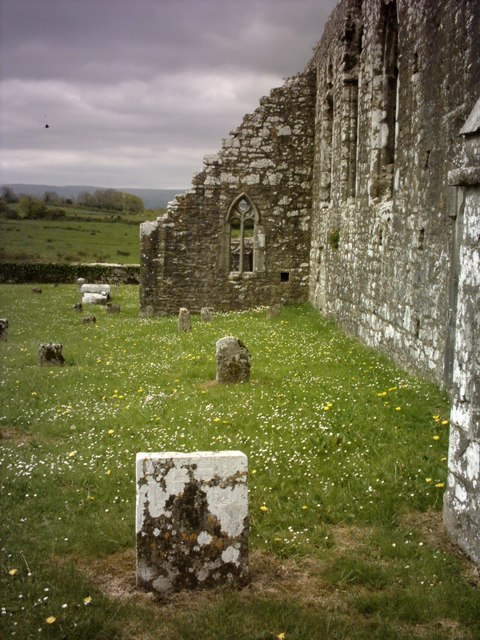
The lancet window

The lower church has some 13th century niches but much of it was rebuilt in the 15th century when the present windows were inserted.

The rectangular church has a south aisle with a two-arch arcade. It has a traceried east window and a piscina.

The cloister lies to the north of the church but there are no remains of an arcade.
