= Thomas Kerr Lynch =

Irish explorer

Thomas Lynch
- Born: 1818; Ballinrobe, Ireland, British Empire
- Died: 1891 (aged 72–73); London, England, British Empire

Thomas Kerr Lynch (1818–1891) was an Irish explorer.

== Life ==
A younger brother of Henry Blosse Lynch (born 1807), Thomas was born in 1818 at Partry House, Ballinrobe (then in County Galway but now in County Mayo) to Major Henry Blosse Lynch (1778–1823). The major had served in the 73rd Regiment and had an estate of fifteen hundred acres north of Ballinrobe. The Lynch family were one of The Tribes of Galway, been descended from Henry Lynch who died in 1635.

In 1837 Thomas joined his brother Henry, who commanded an expedition up the Tigris river to Baghdad, a voyage previously unaccomplished by Western explorers. Thomas went on to establish a steamer service on the Tigris. In the 1850s, Thomas, who had by then travelled extensively throughout Mesopotamia and Iran, was appointed Consul-General for Iran in London. He was made a Knight of the Order of the Lion and the Sun.

Thomas Kerr Lynch died in London in 1891.
