= Adolf Wilhelm von Kessler =

German banker

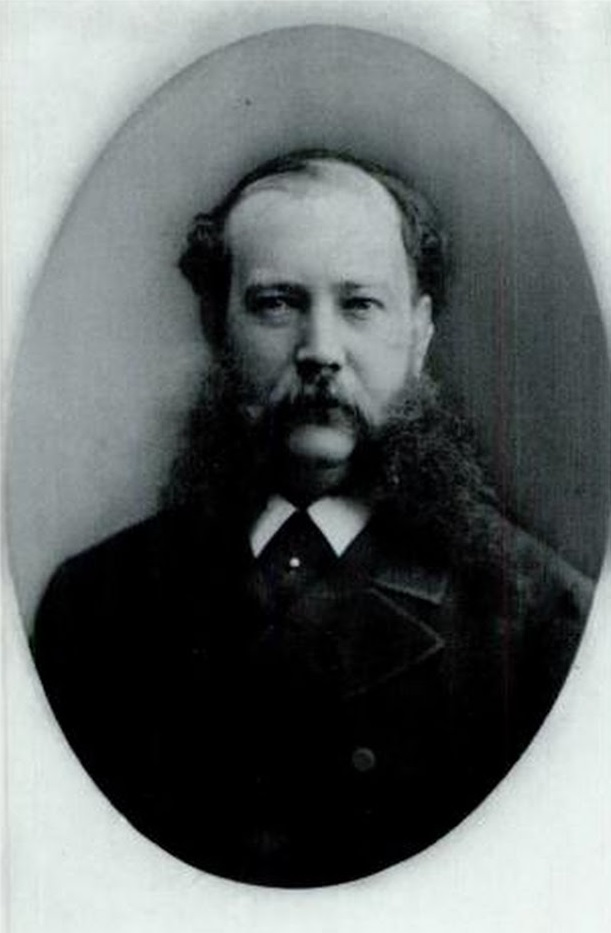
- Born: Adolf Wilhelm Kessler; November 24, 1839; Hamburg, Germany
- Died: May 22, 1895 (aged 55); Paris, France
- Occupation: banker
- Spouse: Alice Harriet Blosse Lynch
- Children: 2 (including Harry von Kessler)

Count Adolf Wilhelm von Kessler (24 November 1839 – 22 May 1895) was a German banker. He was ennobled by Wilhelm I in 1879, becoming a member of the hereditary nobility, and was made a count in 1881 by Heinrich XXIV, Prince Reuss of Köstritz.

== Biography ==
Kessler was born on 24 November 1839 in Hamburg. He was the son of Johann Ulrich Kessler, a Reformed preacher from St. Gallen, Switzerland, and Henriette Louise Auffm'Ordt, a member of a wealthy banking family in Hamburg.

Kessler worked at a bank owned by his uncle, Clement Auffm'Ordt, and became manager of the Paris branch.

In 1867, he married Alice Harriet Blosse Lynch, the daughter of Anglo-Irish explorer Henry Blosse Lynch. They had two children, Wilhelmina and Harry. They lived in Paris until 1870, when they relocated to the United Kingdom due to the Franco-Prussian War. While in England, he managed the London branch of the family bank. From 1872 to 1873, they lived in the United States before returning to Paris.

Kessler was elevated to the hereditary nobility by Emperor Wilhelm I in 1879. He was made a count in 1881 by Heinrich XXIV, Prince Reuss of Köstritz.

He died on 22 May 1895 in Paris.
