= Sir Henry Lynch, 1st Baronet =

Irish lawyer (died 1635)

Henry Lynch
- Baronet Lynch of Galway
- Tenure: 1622–1635
- Successor: Sir Robert Lynch, 2nd Baronet
- Born: unknown
- Died: 21 February 1635
- Spouse: Elizabeth Martin
- Issue Detail: Robert, and others
- Father: Nicholas Lynch
- Mother: unknown

Sir Henry Lynch, 1st Baronet (died 1635) was an Irish baronet, knight, lawyer, and land agent (i.e. estate manager). Lynch was among the first of his family to become a lawyer, and several of his younger sons followed him into this profession, as did, under his influence, Patrick D'Arcy, Richard Martyn, and Geoffrey Browne as well as many of the later generations of the Tribes of Galway.

Family tree

Henry Lynch with wife, father, and other selected relatives. (Note: Based on the genealogy of the Lynch baronets. Also see the lists of children in the text.)

Richard; Martin	Nicholas; Lynch fl. 1584–1585
James; Darcy d. 1603	Elizabeth; Martin	Henry; Lynch; 1st Bt. d. 1635
Patrick; D'Arcy; 1598–1668	Robuck; Lynch; 2nd Bt. d. 1667	Ellice; French	Geoffrey; Browne d. 1668	Mary; Lynch d. 1671
Henry; Lynch; 3rd Bt. d. 1691	Margaret; Bourke

Legend

XXX	Subject of the article	XXX	Lynch baronets

== Birth and origins ==
Henry was born the eldest of the 12 sons of Nicholas FitzStephen Lynch. His father was mayor of Galway 1584–1585. Henry was a great-grandson of Mayor Arthur Lynch (died 1539). His father's family was one of the 14 merchant families known as the Tribes of Galway. Nothing seems to be known about his mother.

== Marriage and children ==
In or after 1603 Henry Lynch married Elizabeth, daughter of Richard Martyn and widow of James D'Arcy. This made him the stepfather of Patrick D'Arcy.

Henry and Elizabeth had three sons:

1. Robuck (or Robert) (died 1667), his successor and mayor of Galway for 1638–39.
2. Nicholas, a student of the Middle Temple in 1634
3. Maurice, married Janet, youngest daughter of Sir Peter French, knight

—and three daughters:

1. Elizabeth, married Thomas Lynch, ancestor of the Lynchs of Drimcong
2. Mary (died 1671), married Geoffrey Browne of Galway
3. Elinor (died 1692), married Sir Valentine Blake, Baronet of Menlough

== Later life ==
Lynch was the Galway land agent (i.e. estate manager) for Richard Burke, 4th Earl of Clanricarde, who lived in south-east England. Their surviving correspondence from c. 1617 to c. 1632 was published in 1996. He was a mentor to his stepson Patrick D'Arcy and his nephew Richard Martyn, who later became senior political figures of Confederate Ireland.

Lynch was created a baronet on 8 June 1622 and thus became Sir Henry Lynch, 1st Baronet. Lord Falkland, the Lord Deputy, knighted Sir Henry in 1625. Sir Henry was Recorder of Galway from 1625 to his death in 1635.

He seems to have been the "Sir Henry Lynch", who was one of the 11 Irish agents who in 1628 negotiated with Charles I of England for the Graces. Together with Sir Lucas Dillon he represented Connaught among these agents.

Sir Henry shortly sat for County Galway in the parliament of 1634–1635. He was elected in June 1634 but fell ill and was replaced by Sir Richard Blake in a by-election in December. The parliamentary records indicate that he lived in Galway but also at Castle Carra in County Mayo.

== Death and succession ==
Sir Henry Lynch died 21 February 1635 and was buried in the church of St Nicholas in Galway. He was succeeded by his eldest son Robert as 2nd Baronet.

== Notes and references ==
=== Sources ===
- Burke, Bernard; Burke, Ashworth P. (1909). A Genealogical and Heraldic History of the Peerage and Baronetage, the Privy Council, Knightage and Companionage (71st ed.). London: Harrison. OCLC 28297274.
- Clarke, Aidan (1976). "Chapter VIII: Selling Royal Favours, 1624–32". In Moody, Theodore William; Martin, F. X.; Byrne, Francis John (eds.). A New History of Ireland. Vol. III. Oxford: Oxford University Press. pp. 233–242. ISBN 0-19-820242-3. – 1624 to 1632
- Cunningham, Bernadette (1996). "Clanricard Letters". Journal of the Galway Archaeological and Historical Society. 48: 162–208.
- G. E. C. (1900). Complete Baronetage, 1611 to 1800. Vol. I (1st ed.). Exeter: William Pollard & Co. OCLC 866278985. – 1611 to 1625
- Hardiman, James (1820). History of the town and county of the town of Galway. Dublin: W. Folds & Sons. OCLC 875131724.
- House of Commons (1878). Return. Members of Parliament – Part II. Parliaments of Great Britain, 1705–1796. Parliaments of the United Kingdom, 1801–1874. Parliaments and Conventions of the Estates of Scotland, 1357–1707. Parliaments of Ireland, 1599–1800. London: His/Her Majesty's Stationery Office. OCLC 13112546.
- O'Sullivan, Mary Donovan (1983) [1st pub. 1942]. Old Galloway: the history of a Norman colony in Ireland. Galway: Kennys Bookshops and Art Galleries. ISBN 978-0-906312-21-6.

Parliament of Ireland
Preceded by Sir William Bourke; John More	Member of Parliament for County Galway; 1634; With: Sir Valentine Blake	Succeeded by Sir Richard Blake; Sir Valentine Blake
Baronetage of Ireland
New creation	Baronet (of Galway); 1622–1635	Succeeded by Robuck Lynch
