= Partraige =

Historical Irish people

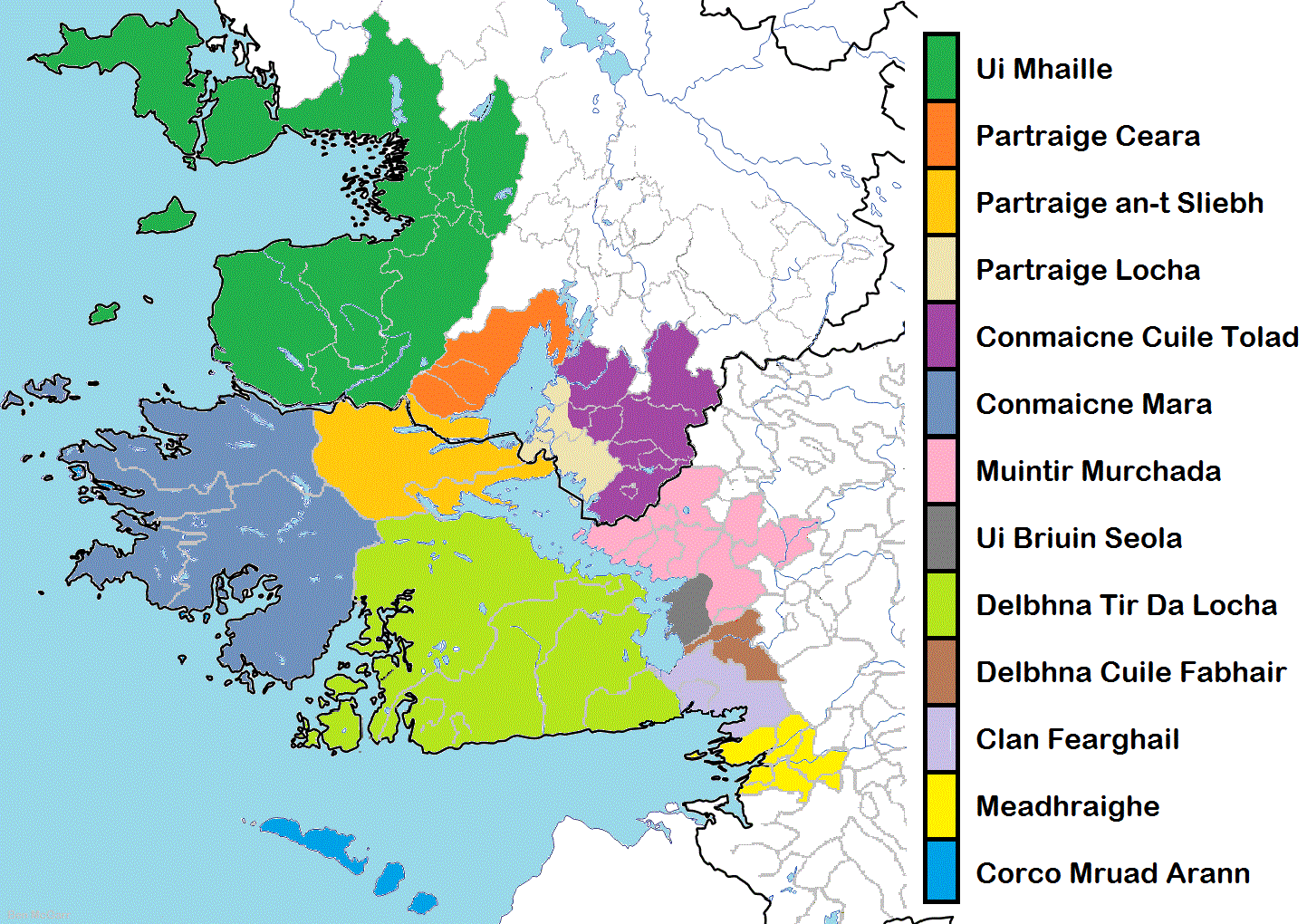
Early mediaeval polities of south-west Connacht (Partraige in centre)

The Partraige ([ˈpart̪ɾəɣʲe], Anglicised as Partry, Partree) were a people of early historic Ireland.

Several attested branches were found in Ireland, including the following:

- Partraige Cera ('Partraige of [Lough] Carra') - located at the northern end of Lough Mask (Loch Mask) and the region of Lough Carra (Loch Corrib), County Mayo.
- Partraige in Laca ('Partraige of the Lake') - at and around Cong, County Mayo, which borders Lough Corrib.
- Partraige in tSlebe ('Partraige of the Mountains') - covering the area from Croagh Patrick to Lough Corrib, all of south-west Mayo
- Partraige Beca ('Little Partraige') - located at Crossakell, south of Kells, County Meath.

All appear to have been of fortuatha status, perhaps indicating a more ancient presence in their territories than the more historically prominent groups to whom they were subject in the early mediaeval period. Francis John Byrne has suggested that the Partraige may have been "a remnant of a pre-Celtic population, akin perhaps to the Illyrian tribe commemorated in the Bavarian resort of Garmish-Partenkirchen." He also suggests that the Fir Umaill found in Clew Bay (later the Uí Briúin) probably were a later branch.

In the later mediaeval period, the Connacht branches of the Patraige all came under the domination of the Anglo-Norman Joyce family, giving rise to the so-called Joyce Country. They have given their name to the district of Partry.

== Partraige an-t Sliebh ==
Ruled by chiefs of the O'Kynes, the "Partraige of the Mountains" were subject to the Conmaicne Cuile Tolad and later the Anglo-Norman Joyces. St Brendan's Abbey in Kilbeg Lower, Ross, County Galway was their ecclesiastical centre.

== Partraige Locha ==
Ruled by chiefs of the O'Dorchys, the "Partraige of the Loch" were likewise subject to the Conmaicne Cuile Tolad and the Joyces. St Fechin's Abbey in Cong, Kilmaine, County Mayo was their ecclesiastical centre.

== Partraige Ceara ==
Ruled by chiefs of the O'Garvalys, the "Partraige of (the Barony of) Carra" were pushed back into the district of Odhbha (Ballyovey) by the Fir Ceara of the Uí Fiachrach Muadhe, later to be absorbed into Joyce Country. An early convent was found on their territory at Rocksboro South, Ballinrobe, Kilmaine, County Mayo, though St Mochua's Abbey of Balla was the most significant ecclesiastical centre for this polity.

== See also ==
- Aodh Ua Goirmghiallaigh
- Patrick D'Arcy
- Goidelic substrate hypothesis
- Pre-Norman invasion Irish Celtic kinship groups, from whom many of the modern Irish surnames came from
