= Deutscher Künstlerbund =

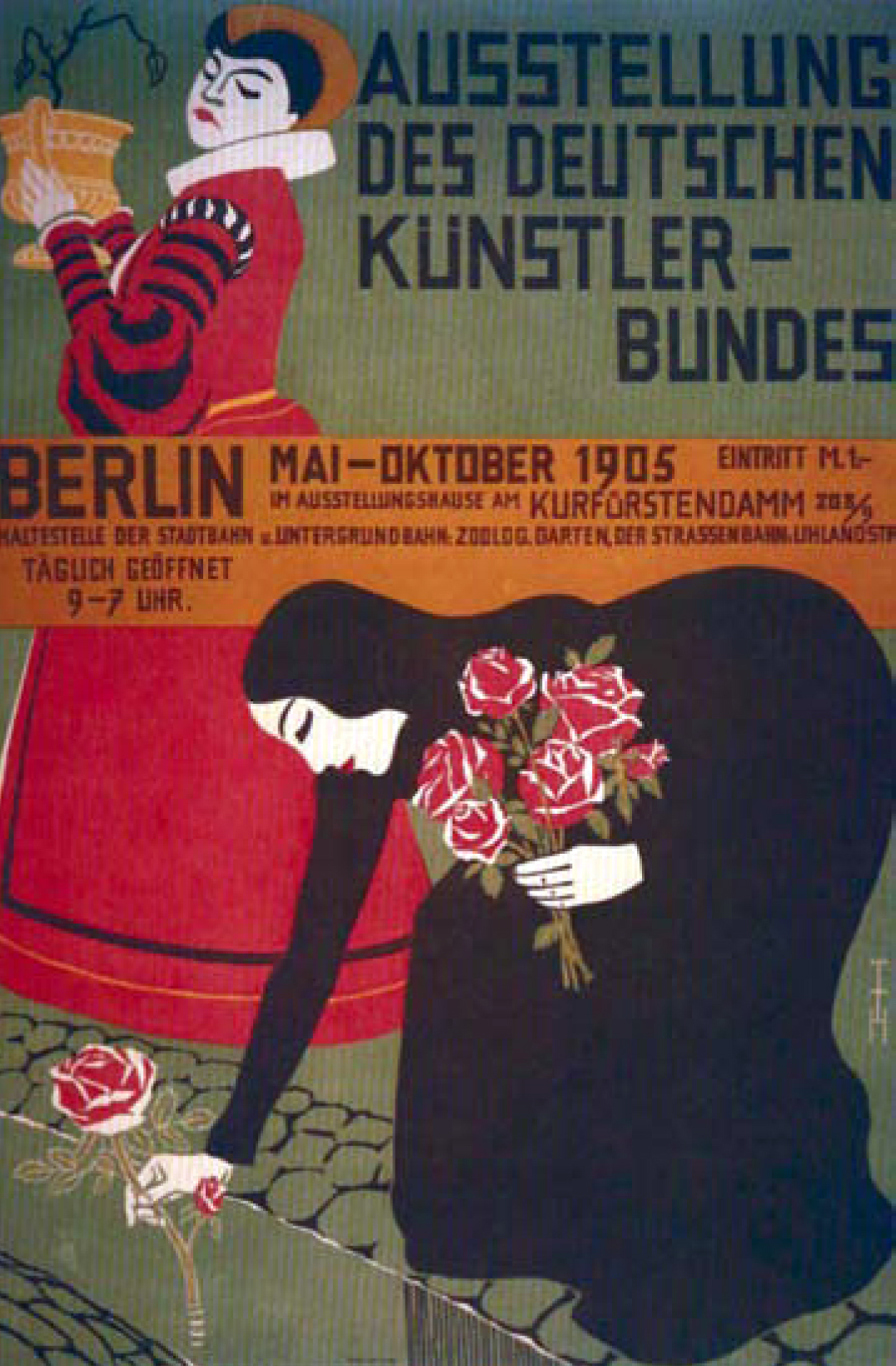
- Founder: Count Harry Kessler
- Type: Artists' association
- Purpose: To ensure the freedom of art
- Location: Berlin, Germany
- Members: 600

The Deutscher Kuenstlerbund (Association of German Artists) was founded in 1903 on the initiative of Count Harry Kessler, a promoter of arts and artists; Alfred Lichtwark, director of the Hamburg Art Gallery; and the famous painters Lovis Corinth, Max Klinger and Max Liebermann, among others. Thus a supra-regional association which surpassed the existing secessions came into existence for the first time. Its founders were determined to get rid of the restrictions imposed by the national cultural authorities. Their aim was to ensure the freedom of art, to offer a public forum for different artistic trends and to support young artists. These intentions were taken into account at annual exhibitions which took place in various German cities and sometimes in foreign countries.

== History ==
The Deutscher Künstlerbund organized its first exhibition from June 1 to October 31, 1904 and the second from May 2 to October 6, 1905, inaugurating at the same time its showrooms in the new exhibition building, "an extensive general view of the existing modern forces in Germany", as a contemporary reviewer put it.

In 1936 the exhibition in Hamburg was closed by the National Socialists and the Deutscher Künstlerbund was closed at the same time. Until then the general public had been offered a remarkable spectrum of 20 exhibitions on a high artistic level. Nearly all German artists who occupied a high rank in the artistic world within the first three decades of the last century were members of the Deutscher Künstlerbund and they made use of the platform to display their artistic ideas undisturbed by any governmental interference. The boost and the breakthrough of modern art is closely connected to the history of the Deutscher Künstlerbund.

In 1905, Max Klinger acquired the Villa Romana in Florence on behalf of the Deutscher Künstlerbund as a place for cultural exchange which testifies to the high politico-cultural commitment of the Deutscher Künstlerbund.

In 1950, some former members of the Deutscher Künstlerbund – Karl Hofer, Willi Baumeister, Karl Hartung and Karl Schmidt-Rottluff – re-established the group. They picked up the thread of the interrupted tradition of modern art, remembered the resolutions of the founding years and advocated again the freedom of art. They influenced the cultural and political life of post-war Germany by resuming the annual exhibitions and by taking numerous political initiatives. And this holds true today, too.

The Deutscher Künstlerbund is a member of various institutions which support artists, fight for copyrights and social security such as Kunstfonds, Verwertungsgesellschaft Bild-Kunst, Privatinitiative Kunst, Internationale Gesellschaft für Bildende Kunst (IGBK), and the section Fine Arts in Deutscher Kulturrat. Deutscher Künstlerbund is sustaining member of the Villa Romana in Florence.

Already in 1974 a fee for the artists taking part in exhibitions was introduced. At the suggestion of its chairman at that time, Georg Meistermann, the Collection of the Federal Republic of Germany was founded which supports artist and helps to bring art within the reach of the public. A first extensive exhibition took place in the Multihalle Mannheim 1976 based on new founding structure. In the course of the discussion on the establishment of the German national foundation, the Deutscher Künstlerbund organized a colloquium, as a result of which the "Kunst- und Ausstellungshalle des Bundes" was conceived and realized. The extensive annual exhibitions have offered many artists a podium and we must not forget that it was the Deutscher Künstlerbund which was the first institution to show works of art of artist from the German Democratic Republic in 1990. In 2003 the Association of German Artists celebrated its 100th anniversary as one of the oldest and most renowned associations of artists in Europe.

Today about 600 visual artists are members of the Deutscher Künstlerbund which makes it unique in its composition and in the important role it plays in the dialogue between artists and the public. By cooperating in governmental committees, boards of curators and panels which play an advisory role in the debating of bills, the Deutscher Künstlerbund looks after the interests of many artists in Germany. The association is also represented in the Sachverständigenkreis für Kunst am Bau of the Federal Ministry of Transport, Building and Urban Affairs and in the Bundesakademie für kulturelle Bildung Wolfenbüttel.]
