= Dominick Browne (mayor) =

Irish mayor

Dominick Browne, Mayor of Galway, 1688–1689.

Browne was a grandson of Sir Dominick Browne and a member of The Tribes of Galway. He was one of the first Catholics to become Mayor since 1654, and would be one of the last of the mayors who was a member of the tribal families.

His descendants would include Baron Oranmore and Browne, Garech Browne and Tara Browne.

Civic offices
Preceded by Theodore Russell	Mayor of Galway; September 1688 – September 1689	Succeeded by Alexandar McDonnell
