= Castle Carra =

Hall house, County Mayo, Ireland

- Caisleán Cheara (Irish)
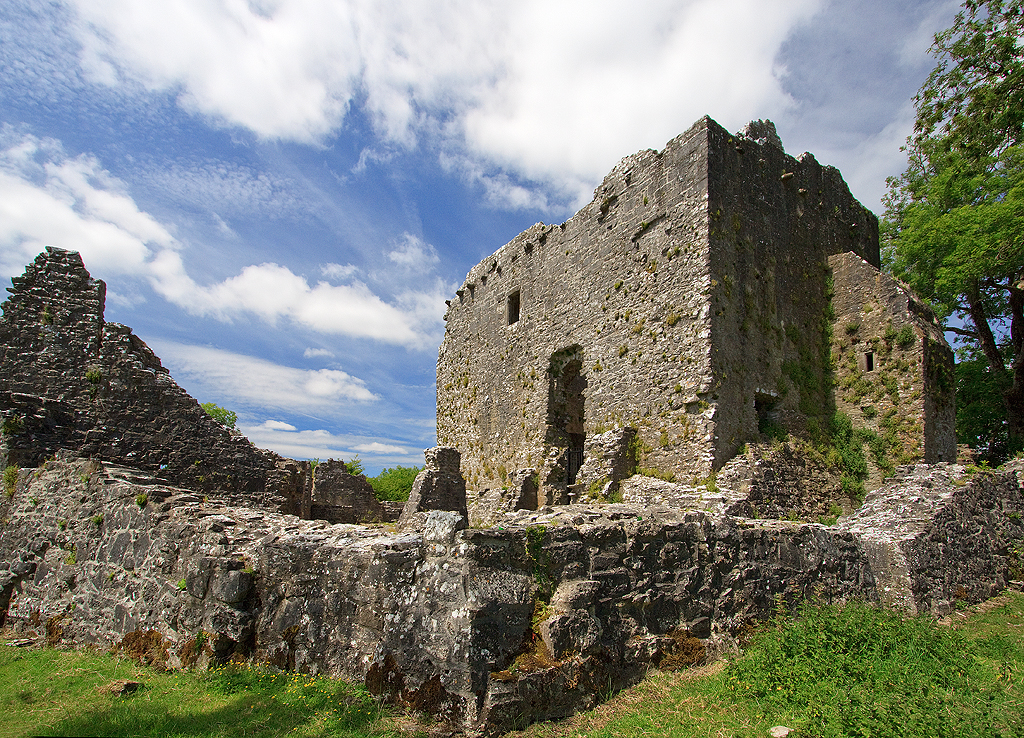

- Location within Ireland
- 53.721389°N 9.255278°W
- Type: hall house
- Location: Castlecarra, Carnacon, County Mayo, Ireland

History
- Built: 13th century

Site notes
- Owner: State

National monument of Ireland
- Official name: Castlecarra
- Reference no.: 222B

Castle Carra is a hall house and National Monument located in County Mayo in the west of Ireland.

== Location ==
Castle Carra is located 2.5 km (1.6 mi) west of Carnacon, on the east bank of Lough Carra. It lies on the edge of Black Hole, the deepest part of the lake.

== History ==
Castle Carra was built by Adam de Staunton (Staundun), an Anglo-Norman subject of the de Burgo, in the 13th century. The plinth, bawn, outbuilding and gateways were added by the MacEvilly family (Gaelicized branch of the de Stauntons) in the 15th century.

The castle was surrendered to the Crown in the 1570s and granted to Captain William Bowen, who strengthened the bawn with a circular flanker with gunloops facing inland.

Sir Roebuck Lynch's lands were seized by the Cromwellians and he was compensated by lands at Castle Carra during the early seventeenth century. It passed to Sir Henry Lynch, 3rd Baronet in the 1660s, and his descendants held it until the 19th century.

== Building ==
Castle Carra is a rectangular hall house.
