= Henry Blosse Lynch =

Anglo-Irish explorer

- Born: 1807
- Died: 1873 (aged 65–66)
- Occupation: Explorer
- Spouse: Caroline Anne Taylor (m. 1838)
- Children: 4, including Alice
- Relatives: Thomas Kerr Lynch (brother)
- Military career
- Allegiance: United Kingdom
- Service: Royal Indian Navy; Royal Navy
- Rank: Lieutenant

Henry Blosse Lynch (1807—1873) was an Anglo-Irish explorer.

== Biography ==
Henry Blosse Lynch was third of the eleven sons of Major Henry Blosse Lynch (1778-1823) of Partry House, Ballinrobe, County Mayo, His mother was Elizabeth Finnis (from Hythe, Kent, died March 1845). Thomas Kerr Lynch (1818-1891) and Patrick Kerr Lynch were brothers. When he was 16 years old, he volunteered for the Royal Indian Navy, where he served in the survey of the Persian Gulf. He had a gift for Eastern languages and a good knowledge of Arabic, Hindustani and Persian.

At the age of 22 in 1829 he was promoted to lieutenant. He also served as the formal interpreter to the Gulf squadron, whose ships measured and mapped Gulf and the Arabian coast and to the Commodore of the Navy. He spent time traveling around in Arabia and through that was able to develop the position of the director of communications with Arab tribes and their 'shaykhs'.

In 1834, aged 27, he became second in command to Francis Rawdon Chesney. He was now in charge of negotiations with various Arab tribal leaders. He also commanded the Tigris until its sinking, from which he escaped although losing his brother Robert Blosse (1806 - 1836). He was in charge of landing of the British delegation at the Gulf of Antioch and assembling of two steamers, brought from England in parts and ultimately their launch on the Euphrates. He commanded the Tigris until its sinking. After the sinking of the Tigris and the loss of his brother, Lynch returned home in August/September 1836, traveling via Mosul, Iraq and Trabzon, Turkey.

The relationship between Chesney and Lynch was always tense, and they had disagreements.

By 1839 he had finished surveying the river Tigris. Under the command of William Michael Lynch (1811 - 1840), another of Henry Blosse Lynch's brothers, three dismantled steamers (Nimrud, Nitocris and Assyria) were sent around the Cape of Good Hope. They were assembled and joined the Euphrates in Baghdad, which meant that now there were four steamers under the command of H.B. Lynch sailing under the Union Jack.

He surveyed the trigonometric of Mesopotamia in 1841, whilst also establishing a postal service between Baghdad and Damascus with his brother Thomas Kerr Lynch. In 1842 he deployed once more to India. He was an active member of the Bombay Geographical Society and founded the Indian Navy Club. In 1855 when he returned home, he inherited the Mayo estate. One year later he retired from the navy.

He made comprehensive contributions to the survey and study of all the countries he traveled and worked in. Many maps bear his name.

== Personal life ==
Lynch married in August 1838 (aged 31) Caroline Anne Taylor (1817 - 1884), daughter of Colonel Robert Taylor, HM's Minister in Baghdad. They had 4 children: Quested Finnis; Rose; Alice Harriet, whose husband was Count Adolf Wilhelm von Kessler; and Caroline Lynch.
