= Partry House =

Georgian house in County Mayo, Ireland

- Cloonlagheen Castle
- Location: Partry, County Mayo, Ireland

History
- Built: 1667

Site notes
- Architectural style: Georgian
- Owner: Lynch-Blosse family

Partry House is a Georgian country house near Lough Carra in County Mayo and the historic family seat of the Lynch-Blosse baronets. It was built in the 17th century, originally as a dower house, on the ruins of the family's Cloonlagheen Castle.

== History ==
Partry House was built by Arthur Lynch in 1667, on the remains of Cloonlagheen Castle, as a dower house for his mother, Lady Ellis, the widow of Sir Roebuck Lynch of Castle Carra. It is located in the village of Partry in County Mayo. The house remained in the Lynch family from 1667 until 1991. It was the ancestral seat of the Lynch-Blosse baronets.

== Situation ==
The house sits on a 250-acre estate of farmland, bogs, and woodland.
