= Lynch-Blosse baronets =

Baronetcy in the Baronetage of Ireland

- Escutcheon of the Lynch-Blosse baronets
- Creation date: 1622
- Status: extant
- Motto: Nec temere, nec timide, Neither rashly nor timidly

The Lynch Baronetcy of Galway – which later became Lynch-Blosse Baronetcy – is a title in the Baronetage of Ireland. It was created on 8 June 1622 for Henry Lynch, a member of an Anglo-Norman family and one of the merchant Tribes of Galway. Both he and the second Baronet represented County Galway in the Irish House of Commons. The third Baronet was a Baron of the Court of Exchequer (Ireland). Forced to flee to France after the Glorious Revolution, his eldest son succeeded to the title and estates. The family seat was Athavallie House, Castlebar, County Mayo. The sixth Baronet assumed the additional surname of Blosse, having married Elizabeth, daughter and heir of Francis Barker, heir of Tobias Blosse. The seventh Baronet also served in the Irish House of Commons representing Tuam.

The 17th baronet – Sir Richard Hely Lynch-Blosse – is a medical doctor, working as a general practitioner in Clifton Hampden, Oxfordshire.

== Lynch, later Lynch-Blosse baronets, of Galway (1622) ==
- Sir Henry Lynch, 1st Baronet (died 1635)
- Sir Robuck Lynch, 2nd Baronet (died 1667)
- Sir Henry Lynch, 3rd Baronet (died 1691)
- Sir Robert Lynch, 4th Baronet (died c. 1720)
- Sir Henry Lynch, 5th Baronet (died 1762)
- Sir Robert Lynch-Blosse, 6th Baronet (died 1775)
- Sir Henry Lynch-Blosse, 7th Baronet (1749–1788)
- Sir Robert Lynch-Blosse, 8th Baronet (1774–1818)
- Sir Francis Lynch-Blosse, 9th Baronet (1801–1840)
- Sir Robert Lynch-Blosse, 10th Baronet (1825–1893)
- Sir Henry Lynch-Blosse, 11th Baronet (1857–1918)
- Sir Robert Lynch-Blosse, 12th Baronet (1861–1942)
- Sir Robert Cyril Lynch-Blosse, 13th Baronet (1887–1951)
- Sir Robert Geoffrey Lynch-Blosse, 14th Baronet (1915–1963)
- Sir Henry Lynch-Blosse, 15th Baronet (1884–1969)
- Sir David Edward Lynch-Blosse, 16th Baronet (1925–1971)
- Sir Richard Hely Lynch-Blosse, 17th Baronet (born 1953)

The heir presumptive is the present holder's second cousin David Ian Lynch-Blosse (born 1950). His heir apparent is his son Oliver Daniel Lynch-Blosse (born 1989).
