= Sir Henry Lynch, 3rd Baronet =

Sir Henry Lynch, 3rd Baronet (died 1691) was an Irish landowner, barrister and judge. He was one of the Roman Catholic judges appointed by James II & VII of England, Scotland and Ireland in his effort to transform the religious character of the Irish administration. As a judge, Lynch was described in unflattering terms both by his contemporaries and by later historians. Unlike some of his judicial colleagues, he was accused of gross bias against Protestants, which may be why he was one of the few Irish judges who fled abroad after the downfall of James's cause following the Battle of the Boyne. He died in exile in France.

== Background ==
He was a member of one of the oldest and most distinguished families in the city of Galway: his father was Sir Robuck Lynch, 2nd Baronet, who was Mayor of Galway in 1638-9. His mother was Ellen, daughter of Sir Peter French. He succeeded to the title in 1667. He entered the Middle Temple in 1664 and the King's Inn in 1674.

== Judge ==
From 1687 onwards a determined effort was made by the English Crown to replace the Protestants on the Irish Bench with Catholics. Lynch, who had already been appointed Recorder of Galway, was chosen as a Baron of the Court of Exchequer (Ireland). All of James II's Catholic judges were the object of violent attacks on the grounds that they were lacking in integrity and learning, that they were entirely subject to the will of the Lord Deputy of Ireland, Richard Talbot, 1st Earl of Tyrconnell, and that they were "wretchedly poor and indigent". The last charge was certainly not true of Lynch, but Ball notes that when he was appointed a High Court judge he had just twelve years experience at the Irish Bar (although Recorder in Ireland was a full-time role).

James' new judges were barely in office when he was decisively defeated by William III. In the confusion of the years 1688-90 the status of the Irish High Court judges was uncertain, but most continued to act in their judicial capacity, including Lynch, who went on assize in Leinster, and was said to be working with William, who was in any case too preoccupied with other matters to give much attention to reform of the judiciary.

== Exile and death ==
William III did in due course remove James' judges from office, but it seems to have been understood that no other harm would come to them: despite much hostile propaganda, few of them were guilty of any obvious abuse of office, and some of them were men of substance and good reputation. On the face of it therefore it is hard to understand why Lynch fled the country, to die in Brest in 1691. Ball believed the explanation was the discovery of a letter in which Lynch reportedly admitted that in any criminal trial where he had the power to impose the death penalty he would always drive for the execution of a Protestant, defendant, whether they were innocent or guilty.

== Descendants ==
No action was taken against his family after his death. His eldest son Robert inherited his title and estates, and his descendants, the Lynch-Blosse Baronets have held the baronetcy down to the present day.

He married firstly Margaret Bourke, daughter of Theobald Bourke, 3rd Viscount Mayo and his first wife Elizabeth Talbot, and secondly Mary, daughter of Nicholas Blake. By his first wife, he had three sons, Dominick, James and Sir Robert Lynch, 4th Baronet.

Baronetage of Ireland
Preceded by Robuck Lynch	Baronet (of Galway); 1667–1691	Succeeded by Robert Lynch
