= Lough Carra =

Lake in County Mayo, Ireland

- Loch Ceara (Irish)
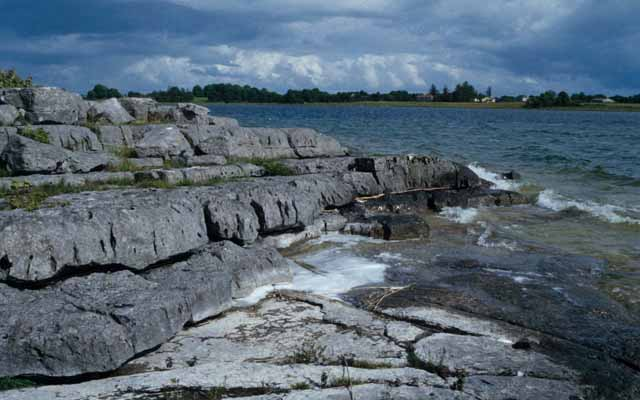

- Location in Ireland
- Location: County Mayo
- Coordinates: 53°40′53″N 9°14′27″W
- Basin countries: Ireland
- Max. length: 6 mi (9.7 km)
- Max. width: 1 mi (1.6 km)
- Surface area: 4,000 acres (16 km^{2})
- Average depth: 6 feet (1.8 m)
- Max. depth: 60 feet (18 m)
- Islands: 73

Lough Carra (Irish: Loch Ceara) is a marl lake of 4,000 acres (16 km^{2}), in County Mayo, Ireland, about 8 miles (13 km) south of Castlebar. It is approximately 6 miles (9.7 km) long and varies in width from 400 yards (370 m) to one mile (1.6 km). The average depth is 6 feet (1.8 m), with a maximum of 60. It drains into Lough Mask via the Keel River.

Lough Carra was part of the estate of the well-known Moore family of Moore Hall.

It is a well-known brown trout lough, and is situated northeast of Lough Mask.

== Annalistic references ==
- AI688.1 Kl. Repose of Indlide, abbot of Cera, and of Diarmait, son of 'In Caech'. [AU —; AU 689].

== Historical sites ==
- Burriscarra Abbey
- Castle Carra

== See also ==
- List of Irish loughs
- Lough Caragh, County Kerry
