= R346 road (Ireland) =

Road in Ireland

R346 road
- Bóthar R346

Route information
- Length: 3.9 km (2.4 mi)

Location
- Country: Ireland
- Primary destinations: County Mayo; Gortaroe (R345 road); Knock South; Dowagh East (R334 road)

Highway system
- Roads in Ireland; Motorways; Primary; Secondary; Regional

The R346 road is a regional road in County Mayo in Ireland. It connects the R345 near Cong to the R334 near Cross, 3.9 kilometres (2.4 mi) away (map of the route).

The government legislation that defines the R346, the Roads Act 1993 (Classification of Regional Roads) Order 2012 (Statutory Instrument 54 of 2012), provides the following official description:

Cong — Cross, County Mayo

Between its junction with R345 at Gortaroe and its junction with R334 at Dowagh East via Knock South all in the county of Mayo.

== See also ==
- List of roads of County Mayo
- National primary road
- National secondary road
- Regional road
- Roads in Ireland
