= R345 road (Ireland) =

Road in Ireland

R345 road
- Bóthar R345
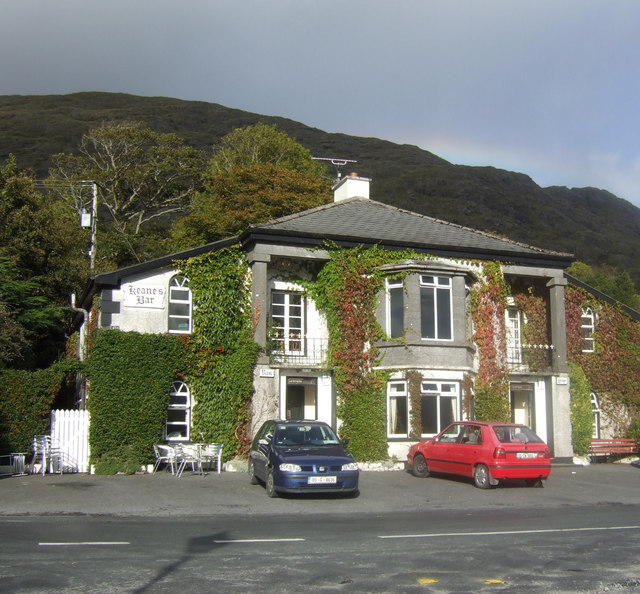
- Maum, County Galway, on the R345

Route information
- Length: 26.4 km (16.4 mi)

Location
- Country: Ireland
- Primary destinations: County Galway; Maum (R336); Cornamona; Crosses the Cornamona River; Clonbur; County Mayo; Ballykine Lower; County Galway; Brandrim; County Mayo; Cong; Neale (R334 road)

Highway system
- Roads in Ireland; Motorways; Primary; Secondary; Regional

The R345 road is a regional road in north County Galway and southwest County Mayo in Ireland. It connects the R336 road at Maum to the R334 road at Neale, 26.4 kilometres (16.4 mi) to the east (map). It crosses the winding border between the two counties a number of times.

The government legislation that defines the R345, the Roads Act 1993 (Classification of Regional Roads) Order 2012 (Statutory Instrument 54 of 2012), provides the following official description:

R345: An Mám, County Galway — Neale, County Mayo

Between its junction with R336 at An Mám in the county of Galway and its junction with R334 at Lecarrowkilleen in the county of Mayo via Corr na Móna, Dúráithe and An Fhairche in the county of Galway: Ballykine Lower in the county of Mayo: Bréandroim in the county of Galway: Main Street (and via Abbey Street and Circular Road) at Cong; Gortaroe and Nymphsfield in the county of Mayo.

== See also ==
- List of roads of County Mayo
- National primary road
- National secondary road
- Regional road
- Roads in Ireland
