= River Cong (Ireland) =

River in Counties Mayo and Galway, Ireland

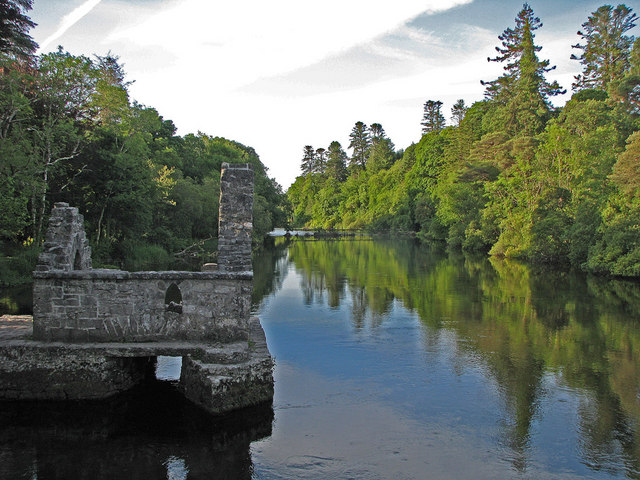
- River Cong

- Source of the River Cong within County Mayo
- Native name: Abhainn Chonga (Irish)

Location
- Country: Ireland
- County: County Galway; County Mayo
- Province: Connacht

Physical characteristics
- Source: Village of Cong, County Mayo
- Mouth: Flows into Lough Corrib
  - coordinates: 53.53276°N 9.28451°W
- Length: 1 mi (1.6 km)
- Discharge
  - average: 37.6 m^{3}/s (1,330 cu ft/s)

The River Cong (Irish: Abhainn Chonga) is a short river of moderate flow in Ireland, primarily in County Mayo but also touching County Galway.

== Course ==
The river issues from the large springs in the village of Cong, County Mayo, springs for which the village is justly famous. The springs are fed by underground flow through caverns in the limestone bedrock of the district from Lough Mask, a little over four miles (6.4 km) to the north. The river is only about one mile (1.6 km) long but some 100 yards (91 m) wide in places. It is divided by an island at one point. It flows strongly past Ashford Castle and into Lough Corrib.

== Recreation ==
The river is popular with fishermen, having a State salmon hatchery and a strong spring salmon run. The peak of the spring run is in April and then the grilse come in May. June to early July are particularly good, and salmon are taken in lesser numbers for the rest of the season. The river also holds stocks of ferox trout (brown trout). The upper stretch has open access, while the lower part is managed by Ashford Castle, and local gillies are available.

== The Cong Canal ==
The Cong Canal was designed to provide a navigable link between Lough Corrib at the village of Cong and Lough Mask, six kilometres to the north. The canal was abandoned unfinished in 1854. The canal was brought to wide public attention in 1872 by the writer William Wilde who coined the name ‘The Dry Canal’. The canal has become something of a tourist attraction in the village of Cong, County Mayo.
