= R346 road =

R346 road may refer to:

- R346 road (Ireland)
- R346 road (South Africa)
