= R334 road (Ireland) =

Road in Ireland

R334 road
- Bóthar R334

Route information
- Length: 20.8 km (12.9 mi)

Location
- Country: Ireland
- Primary destinations: County Mayo; Ballinrobe (N84 road); Neale; Lecarrowkilleen; Cross (R346); Dowagh East; Glencorrib; Crosses the Black River (Moyne Bridge); County Galway; Headford (N84)

Highway system
- Roads in Ireland; Motorways; Primary; Secondary; Regional

The R334 road is a regional road in south County Mayo and north County Galway in Ireland. It connects the N84 road at Ballinrobe to the N84 road again at Headford, 20.8 kilometres (12.9 mi) to the south (map). It passes to the east of Lough Mask and Lough Corrib.

The government legislation that defines the R334, the Roads Act 1993 (Classification of Regional Roads) Order 2012 (Statutory Instrument 54 of 2012), provides the following official description:

R334: Ballinrobe — Neale, County Mayo — Headford, County Galway

Between its junction with N84 at Bowgate Street at Ballinrobe in the county of Mayo and its junction with N84 at Main Street Headford in the county of Galway via Neale, Lecarrowkilleen, Cross, Dowagh East and Glencorrib in the county of Mayo: and Moyne Bridge at the boundary between the county of Mayo and the county of Galway.

== See also ==
- List of roads of County Mayo
- National primary road
- National secondary road
- Regional road
- Roads in Ireland
