= R345 road =

R345 road may refer to:

- R345 road (Ireland)
- R345 road (South Africa)
