= Cong, County Mayo =

Cong Conga or Cunga
- Village
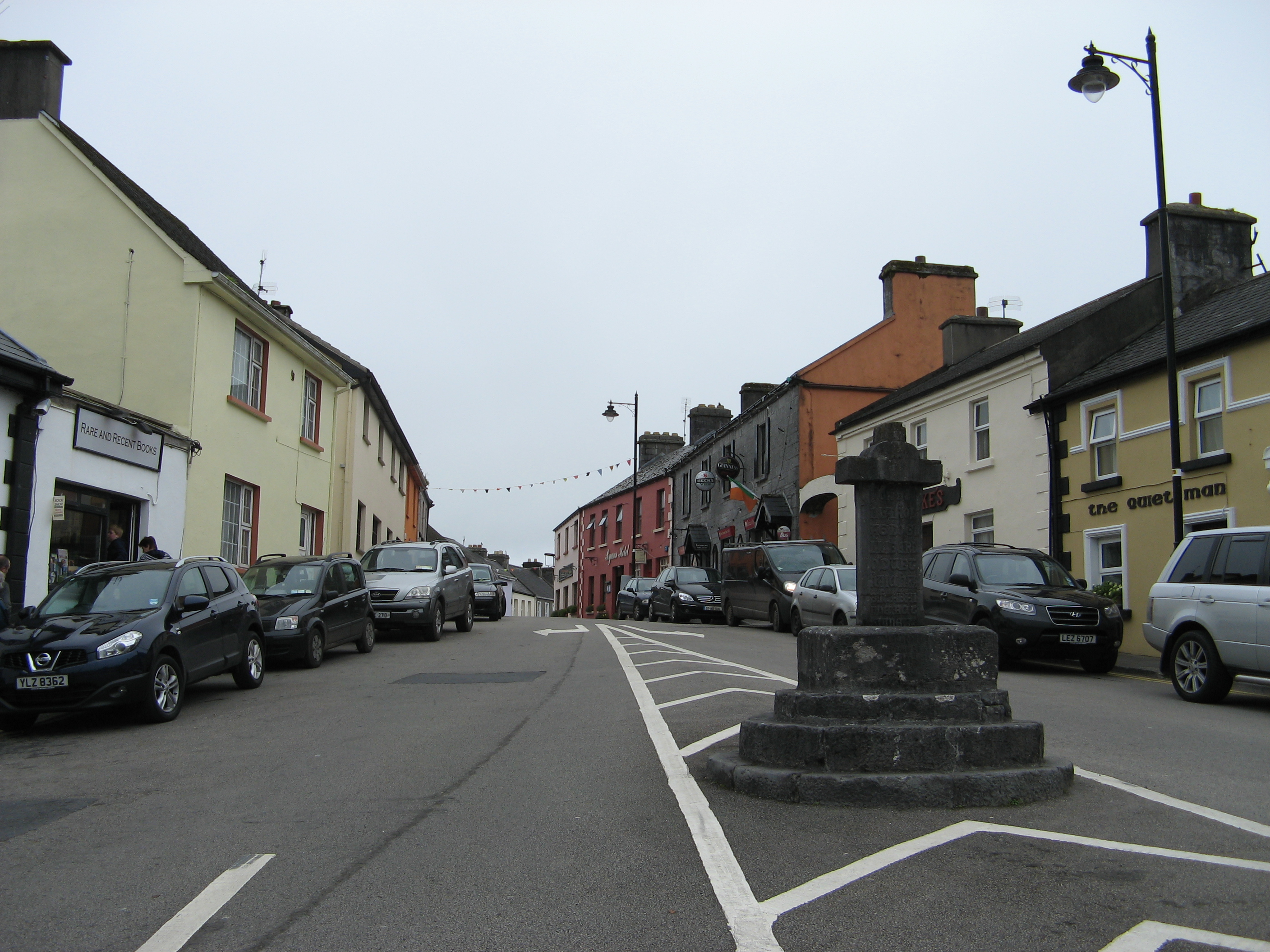
- Main Street

- Location in Ireland
- Coordinates: 53°32′00″N 9°17′00″W
- Country: Ireland
- Province: Connacht
- County: County Galway and County Mayo
- Elevation: 21 m (69 ft)

Population (2016)
  - Total: 145
- Time zone: UTC+0 (WET)
  - Summer (DST): UTC+1 ((IST WEST))
- Irish Grid Reference: M150545
- Website: http://www.congvillage.ie

Cong (Irish: Conga, from Cúnga Fheichín meaning "Saint Feichin's narrows") is a village in County Mayo, Ireland, straddling the border with County Galway. The village is part of a civil parish of the same name.

== Geography ==
Cong is on an island formed by a number of streams that surround it on all sides. Cong is on the isthmus connecting Loughs Corrib and Mask, near the towns of Headford and Ballinrobe and the villages of Clonbur, the Neale and Cross.

Cong is known for its underground streams that connect Lough Corrib with Lough Mask to the north.

== History ==
The 1111 Synod of Ráth Breasail included Cong (Cunga Féichin) among the five dioceses it approved for Connacht, but in 1152 the Synod of Kells excluded it from its list and assigned what would be its territory to the archdiocese of Tuam. No longer a residential bishopric, Cunga Féichin is today listed by the Catholic Church as a titular see.

Cong was also the home of Anglo-Irish landlord Sir William Wilde, who was also a historian and father to prominent playwright, novelist, poet, and short story writer Oscar Wilde.

"The Bard of the West", Micheál Mac Suibhne, who composed his poetry and songs in Connaught Irish, was born at Cong around the year 1760. He spent most of his life in Connemara and died in poverty in about the year 1820.

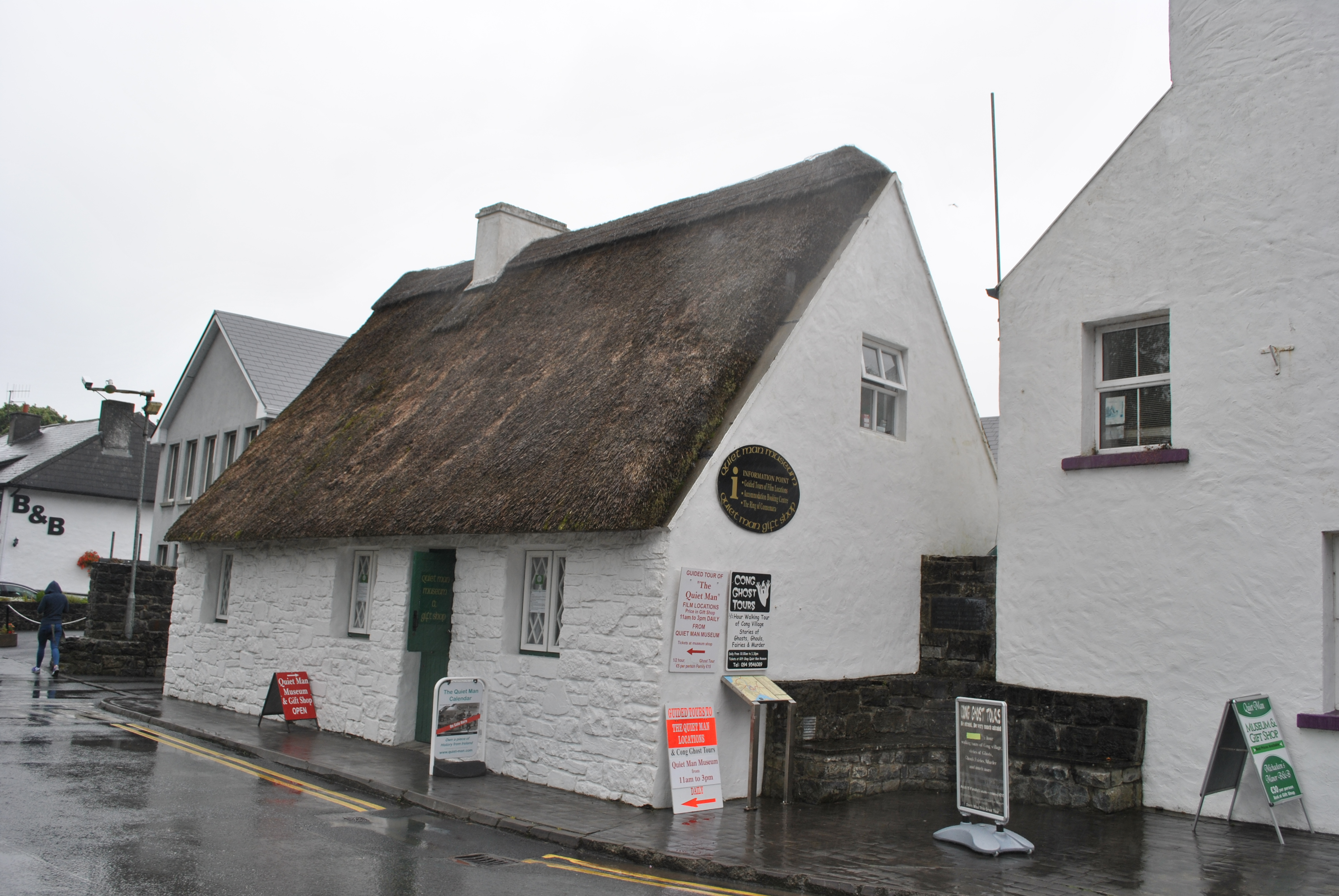
The Quiet Man's cottage

Cong was the filming location for John Ford's 1952 Oscar-winning film, The Quiet Man, featuring John Wayne, Maureen O'Hara and Barry Fitzgerald. Much of the film was filmed on the grounds of Ashford Castle. The town and castle area remain little changed since 1952, and Cong's connection with the movie make it a tourist attraction. (The film is still celebrated by the local "Quiet Man Fan Club").

Roman Catholic records for Cong do not survive from before 1870. Church of Ireland records from the 18th and 19th centuries have survived, however, and are held at the South Mayo Family Research Centre in nearby Ballinrobe.

== Attractions ==
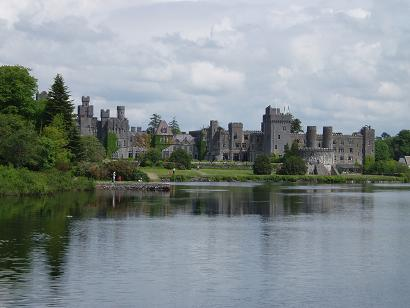
Ashford Castle

Cong is the home of Ashford Castle, a luxury hotel, which was converted from a Victorian faux lakeside castle, built by the Guinness family. Ashford Castle is a tourist attraction in its own right. Cong also features a ruined medieval abbey, Cong Abbey, where Rory O'Connor, the last High King of Ireland, spent his last years. It also is the origin of a piece of Celtic art in the form of a metal cross shrine called the Cross of Cong. The 'Cross of Cong' is now held in the National Museum of Ireland, Dublin. There is a High Cross in the village.

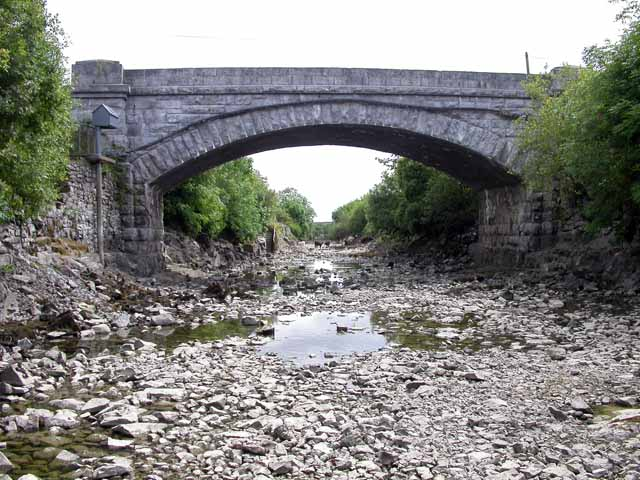
Carrownagower Bridge, Cong Canal.

The Cong Canal, built over five years by the Commissioners of Public Works between 1848 and 1854 as a combined scheme to provide navigation, drainage and mill-power. In 1854 the Commissioners abandoned the navigation aspect of the scheme and instructed Samuel Roberts, their engineer, "to suspend the execution of all navigation works in this division of the district, and complete only such as were necessary for the regulation of the waters of Lough Mask, for drainage purposes." Now it is commonly known as the "Dry Canal"; the water level can vary between zero and 3.5 meters depending on the time of year (summer dry, winter full) and is 5 km in length. Built heritage features of the canal remain.

== Annalistic references ==
From the Annals of Tigernach, Annals of Connacht, the Annals of the Four Masters:

- "T1135.6 Cúnga Fheichín and Annaghdown and Roscommon were burned."
- "T1138.7 Amlaim Mor mac Firbisigh, ollam O Fiachrach uile re senchus & re filidhecht, & sái clerigh co m-bethaigthib ecailsi imda, & togha do Cunga, & a ec and iar m-buaidh ongtha & aithrige./ Amlaim Mor mac Firbisigh, doctor of all the Uí Fiachrach in history and poetry, a sage of a cleric with many ... of the church, and the choice of Cúnga Fheichín, died there after victory of extreme unction and repentance.
- 1168: "Flannagan Ua Dubhthaigh, bishop and chief doctor of the Irish in literature, history, and poetry, and in every kind of science known to man in his time, died in the bed of Muireadhach Ua Dubhthaigh, at Cúnga."
- "M1184.12. Donnell Ó Flannagáin, Lord of Clann Cahill, died at Cúnga Fheichín."
- Dubthaigh Ó Dubhthaigh, Abbot of Cúnga Fheichín, died 1223
- "1226.5. Aed son of Donn Ó Sochlacháin, erenagh of Cúnga Fheichín, a man eminent for chanting and for the right tuning of harps and for having made an instrument for himself which none had made before, distinguished also in every art such as poetry, engraving and writing and in every skilled occupation, died this year."
- "1226.6. Nuala daughter of Ruaidri O Conchobair, queen of the Ulaid, died at Cúnga Fheichín and was buried with great honour in the Canons' church there."
- "1245.4. Domnall O Flannacain, Abbot of Cúnga, died."
- "Nicol Óg, son of the abbot of Cúnga, put this Life of Féchín out of Latin into Gaelic, and Ó Dubhthaigh took and wrote (it); and this is the year of the age of the Lord today, 1329, etc."

== Gallery ==
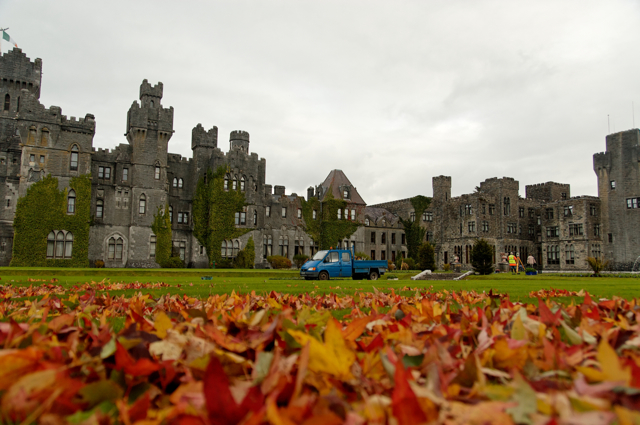
Autumn leaves at Ashford Castle

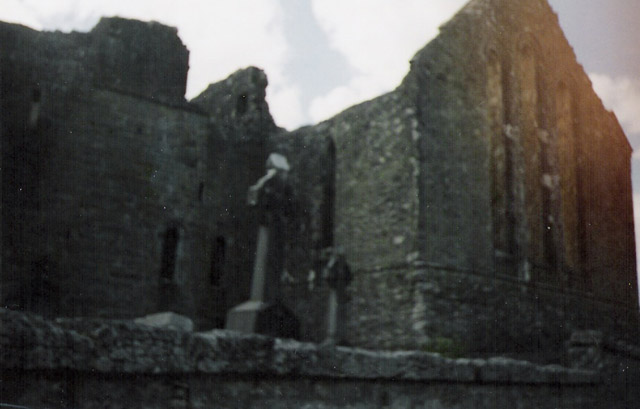
Exterior of Cong Abbey

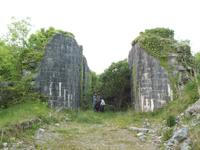
Lock on the Dry Canal

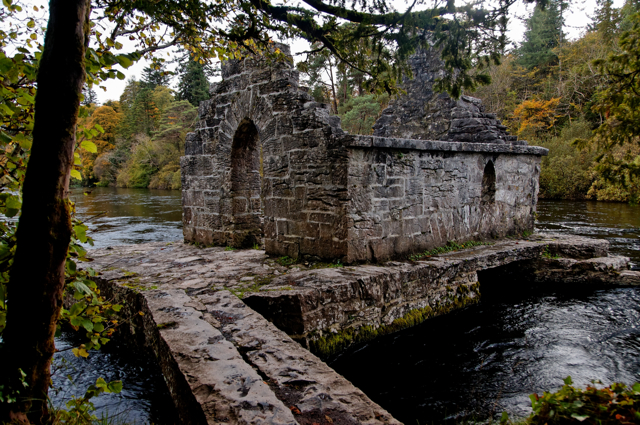
Monk Fishhouse

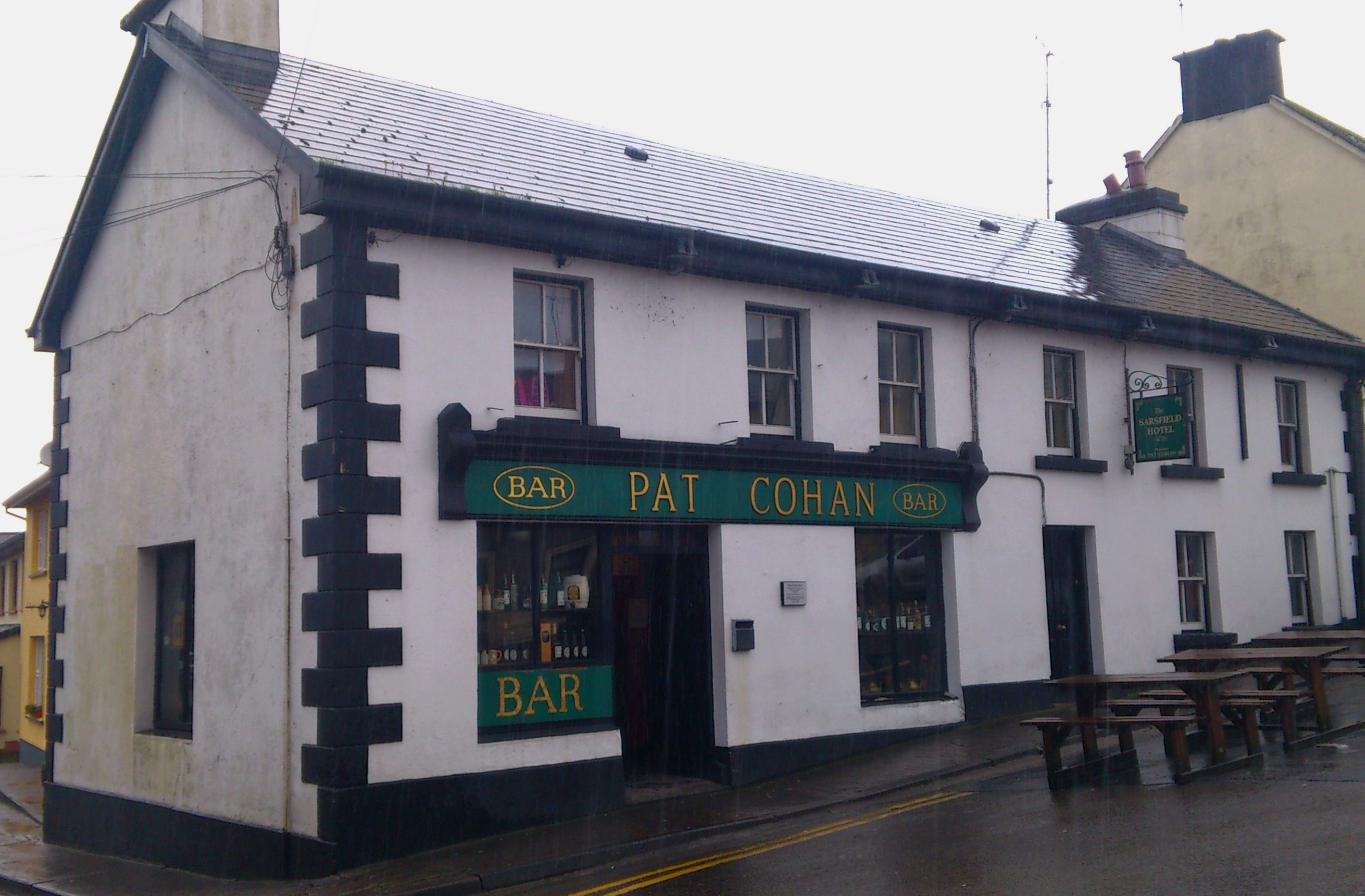
Pat Cohan Bar

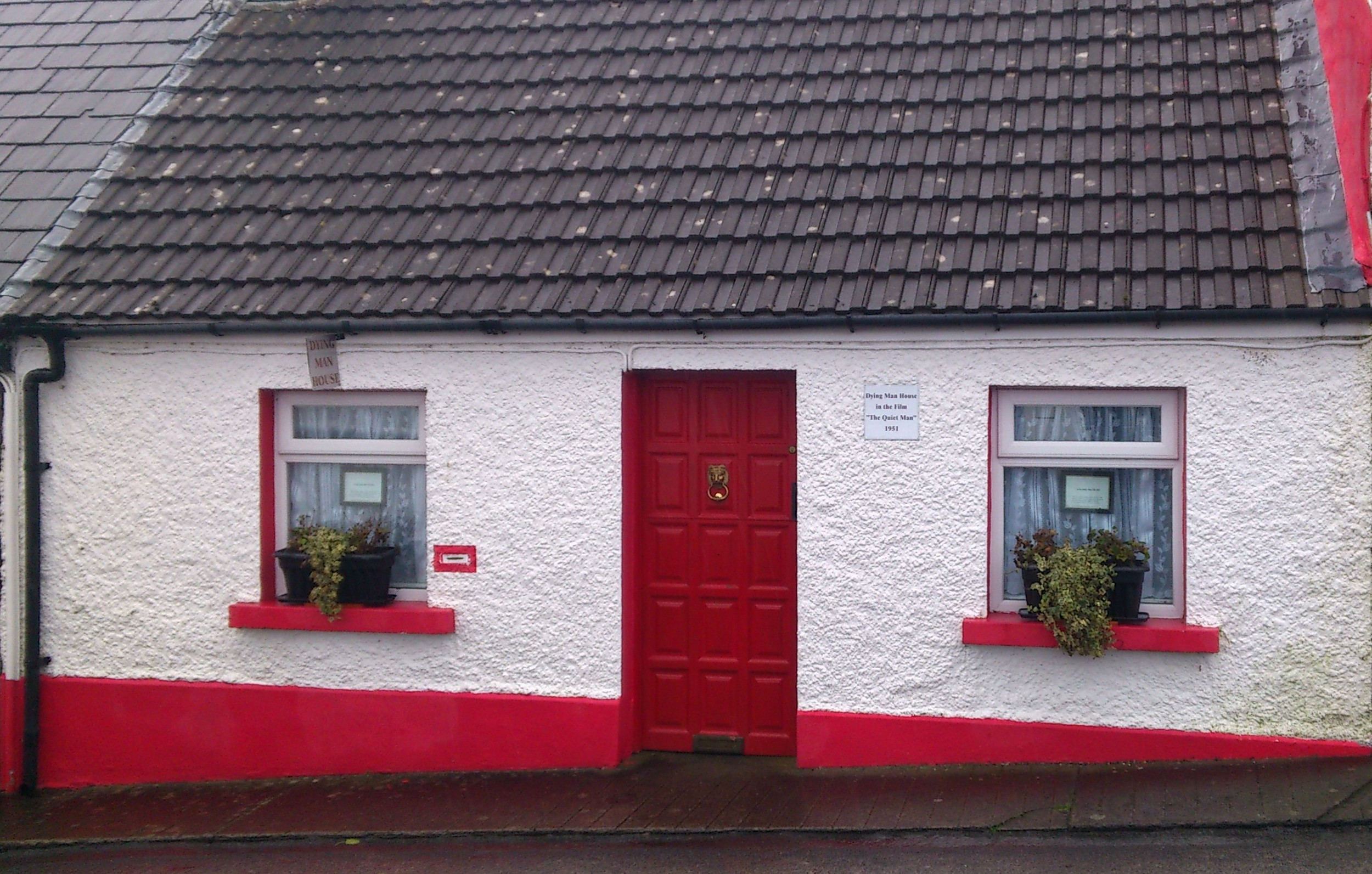
location from the film The Quiet Man

== See also ==
- List of towns and villages in Ireland
