= River Cong =

River Cong may refer to:

- River Cong (Ireland), a river in County Galway, Ireland
- River Cong (Norfolk), a river in Norfolk, England, UK
