= Ashford Castle =

Irish medieval and Victorian castle, now hotel

- Cappacorcoge (Ceapach Chorcóige)
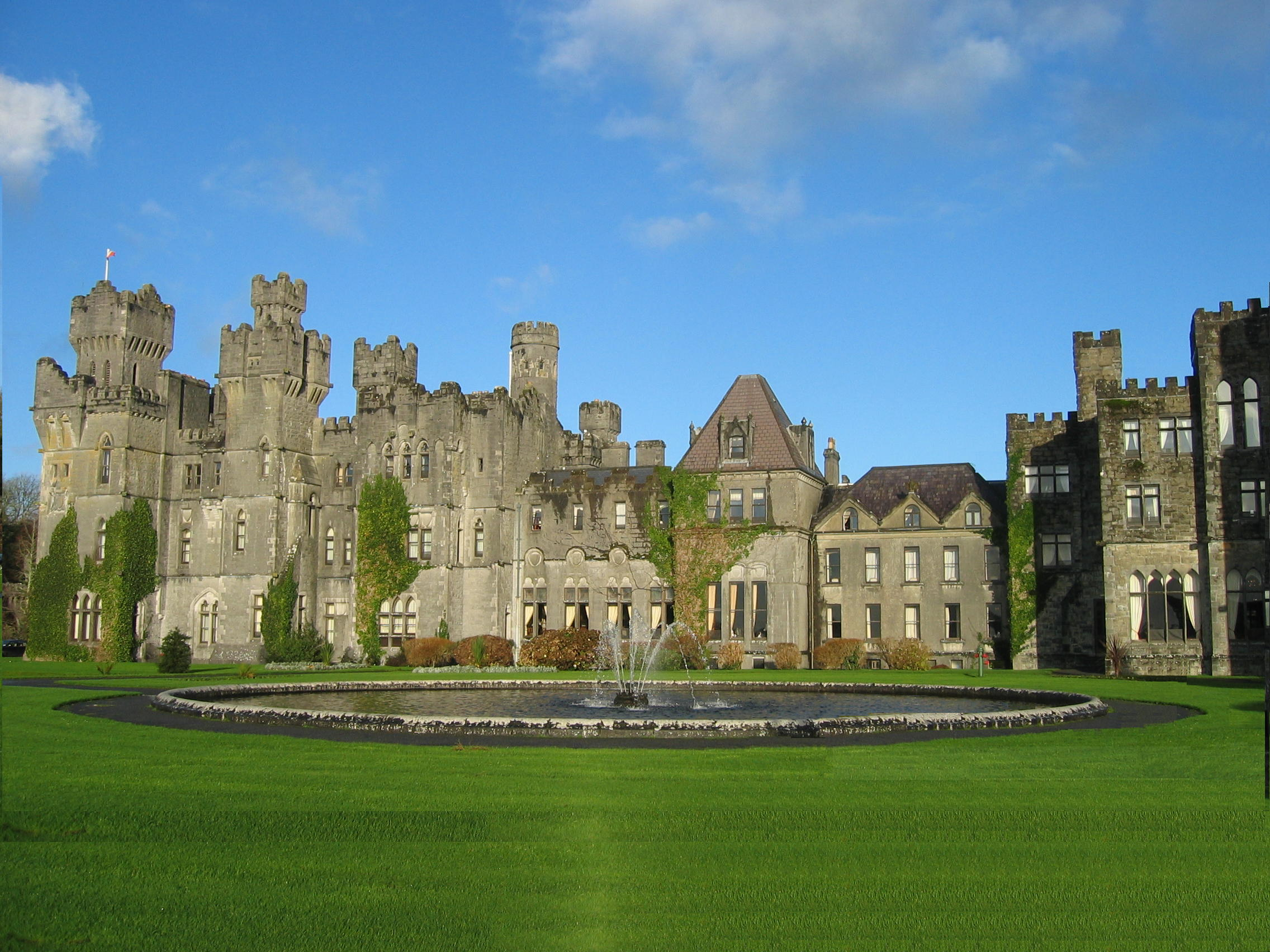

- Location within Ireland

General information
- Type: Hotel
- Architectural style: Gothic, Victorian
- Classification: Protected structure
- Location: County Galway, F31 CA48, Ireland, Ireland
- Coordinates: 53°32′04″N 9°17′06″W
- Elevation: 50 m (160 ft)
- Estimated completion: 1228 (1st iteration)
- Owner: Red Carnation Hotels of The Travel Corporation

Technical details
- Material: limestone

Design and construction
- Developer: Anglo-Norman de Burgo family (13th century); Arthur Guinness, Baron Ardilaun (1875-81)

Renovating team
- Architect: James Franklin Fuller (1875-81)

Website
- www.ashfordcastle.com

Ashford Castle is a mainly Victorian and medieval castle near Cong on the County Mayo–Galway border in Ireland. The castle has been expanded over the centuries and turned into a five star hotel. It is located on the County Galway side of Lough Corrib and was previously owned by the Guinness family.

== History ==
=== Early history ===
A castle was built on the perimeter of a monastic site in 1228 by the Anglo-Norman House of Burke.

After more than three-and-a-half centuries under the de Burgos, whose surname became Burke or Bourke, Ashford passed into the hands of a new master, following a fierce battle between the forces of the de Burgos and those of the English official Sir Richard Bingham, Lord President of Connaught, when a truce was agreed. In 1589, the castle fell to Bingham, who added a fortified enclave within its precincts.

=== Browne family ownership ===
Dominick Browne, of the Browne family (Baron Oranmore and Browne), received the estate in a Royal Grant in either 1670 or 1678. In 1715, the estate of Ashford was established by the Browne family and a hunting lodge in the style of a 17th-century French chateau was constructed. The double-headed eagles still visible on the roof represent the coat of arms of the Brownes.

In the late 18th-century a branch of the family inhabited the castle. In the early 19th-century, one Thomas Elwood was agent for the Brownes at Ashford and was recorded as living there in 1814.

=== Victorian rebuilding ===
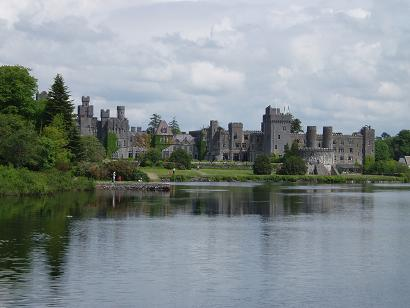
Ashford Castle, viewed from Lough Corrib.

The estate was purchased in 1852 by Sir Benjamin Guinness from Dominick Browne, 1st Baron Oranmore and Browne via the Encumbered Estates' Court. He added two large Victorian style extensions. He also extended the estate to 26,000 acres (110 km^{2}), built new roads and planted thousands of trees. The castle was drawn for Sir William Wilde's book about County Galway. On Sir Benjamin's death in 1868, the estate passed to his son Arthur Guinness, Baron Ardilaun, who expanded the building further in the Neogothic style.

Lord Ardilaun was an avid gardener who oversaw the development of massive woodlands and rebuilt the entire west wing of the castle, designed by architects James Franklin Fuller and George Ashlin. The new construction connected the early 18th-century part in the east with two de-Burgo-era towers in the west. Battlements were added to the whole castle.

He also subsidised the operation of several steamboats, the most notable of which was the Lady Eglinton, which plied between the villages of the Upper Lough Corrib region and Galway City, thus opening the area to increased commerce. In a time of agitation by tenant farmers in the Land Wars of the late 19th century, epitomised by the action of tenants at nearby Lough Mask House (home of Captain Charles Boycott), he was considered by many to be an 'improving' landlord. Some of his efforts were unsuccessful, particularly the Cong Canal, also known as 'the Dry Canal', which was built to link Lough Mask and Lough Corrib but was a failure, due to its inability to hold water. Despite such setbacks, the love borne by him and his wife Olivia, for the castle and the estate was deep and best epitomised by the fact that, when he was ennobled in 1880, he derived his title from the island of Ardilaun, which formed part of the estate on Lough Corrib.

After being rebuilt, the Ashford Castle welcomed many famous guests such as George V, the Prince of Wales, among others who stayed with the Guinness family. The President of the United States Ronald Reagan paid the venue a visit.

=== Hotel ===
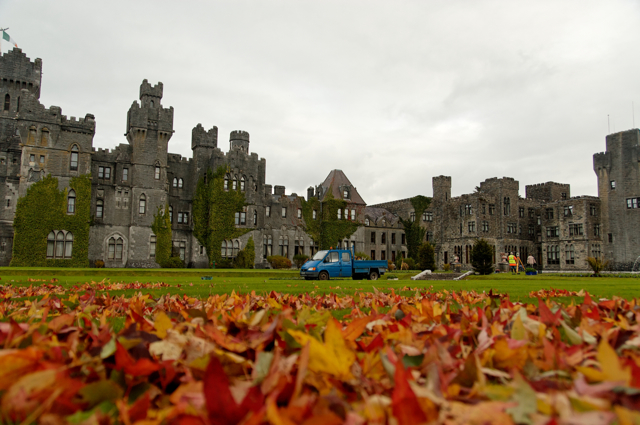
Autumn Leaves at Ashford Castle

The castle passed to Ardilaun's nephew Ernest Guinness and was later sold in 1939 to Noel Huggard. Huggard opened the estate as a hotel, which became known for the provision of its country pursuits, such as angling and shooting. Huggard's parents had been in the hotel business in Waterville, County Kerry, since 1910 and his grandchildren continued to run the Butler Arms Hotel in the town.

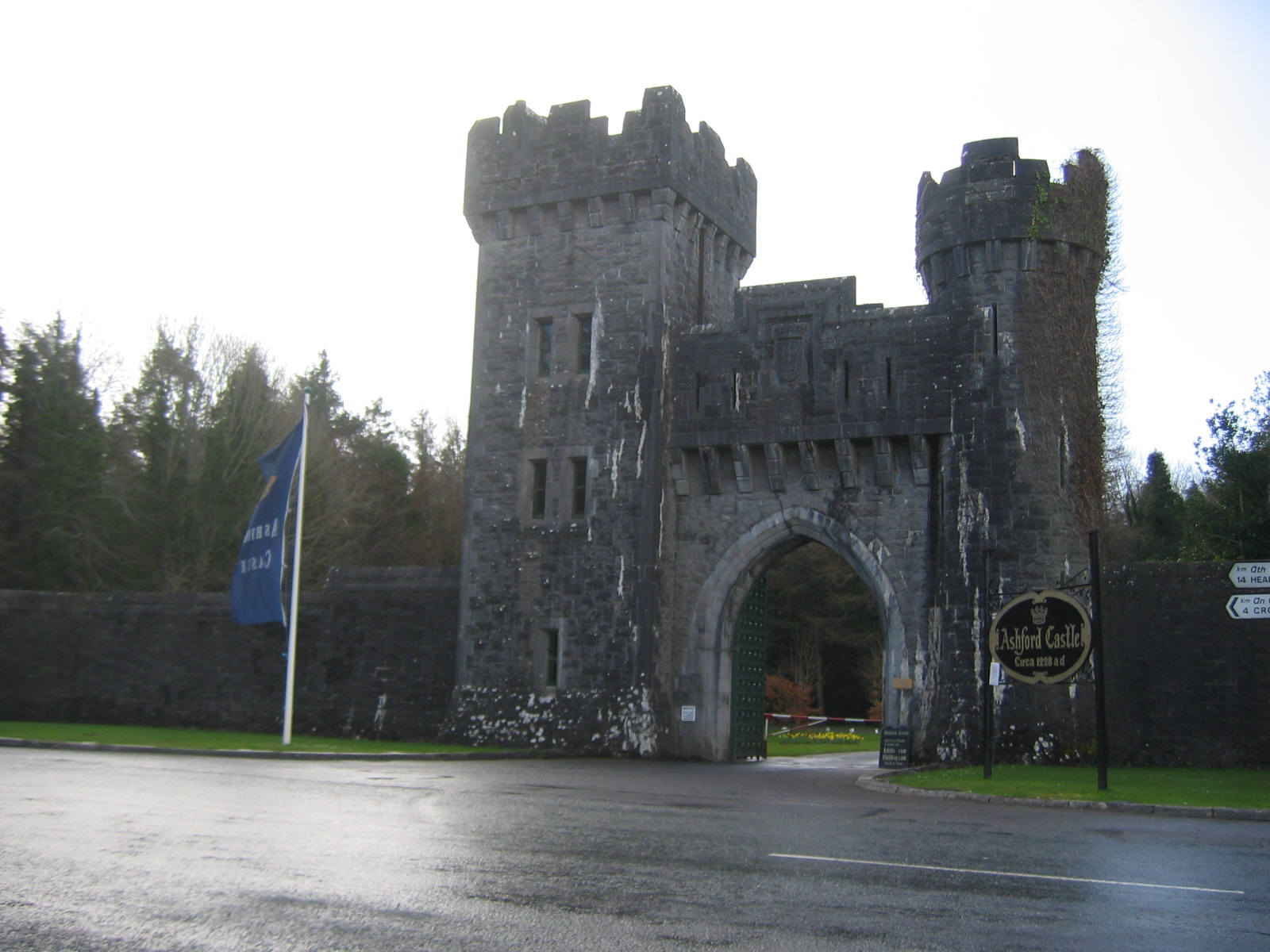
Main gate at the entrance to the castle grounds

In 1951, the film director John Ford came to the west of Ireland to film The Quiet Man, starring John Wayne and Maureen O'Hara. The grounds of the castle, as well as nearby Cong, formed the backdrop for much of the action in the film.

In more recent years the castle has been used as a set for "French Court" in The CW's medieval TV drama Reign. The castle and surrounding grounds feature in the first three seasons of the drama (2013–2015), with the cast and crew returning on a yearly basis to film on the estate.

In 1970, the castle was bought by John Mulcahy, who oversaw its complete restoration and expansion, doubling its size with the addition of a new wing in the early 1970s, building a golf course and developing the grounds and gardens. In 1985, a group of Irish American investors, which included Chuck Feeney and Tony O'Reilly, purchased Ashford. The castle was sold by these investors in 2007 for €50 million to Galway-based property investor Gerry Barrett and his family. While some of Barrett's extensive property loans were to be managed by the Irish National Asset Management Agency (NAMA), Ashford was financed by Bank of Scotland (Ireland), who placed the property in receivership in November 2011, though the hotel continued as a going concern, run by the Tifco Hotel Group, an Irish hotel management company. In September 2012, it was voted the best resort in Ireland and the third best in Europe by Condé Nast Traveler.

In October 2012, the hotel was put up for sale and was valued at around €25 million, half of what Barrett paid in 2007. The hotel currently has 83 bedrooms, six of which are suites. Barret's plan to add another 13 penthouse bedrooms and 30 lodges in the castle grounds was not progressed. In May 2013, the hotel was bought by Red Carnation Hotels, a group which owns several other boutique hotels, for €20 million. The new owner planned a major refurbishment and the sale was expected to preserve the roughly 160 jobs (high season, dropping to 120 in low season) at the property. According to the receiver, Ashford Castle was profitable even during the period of receivership. Niall Rochford, long-time manager of the property, said that staff accepted a 20% to 30% pay cut to ensure the hotel's survival.

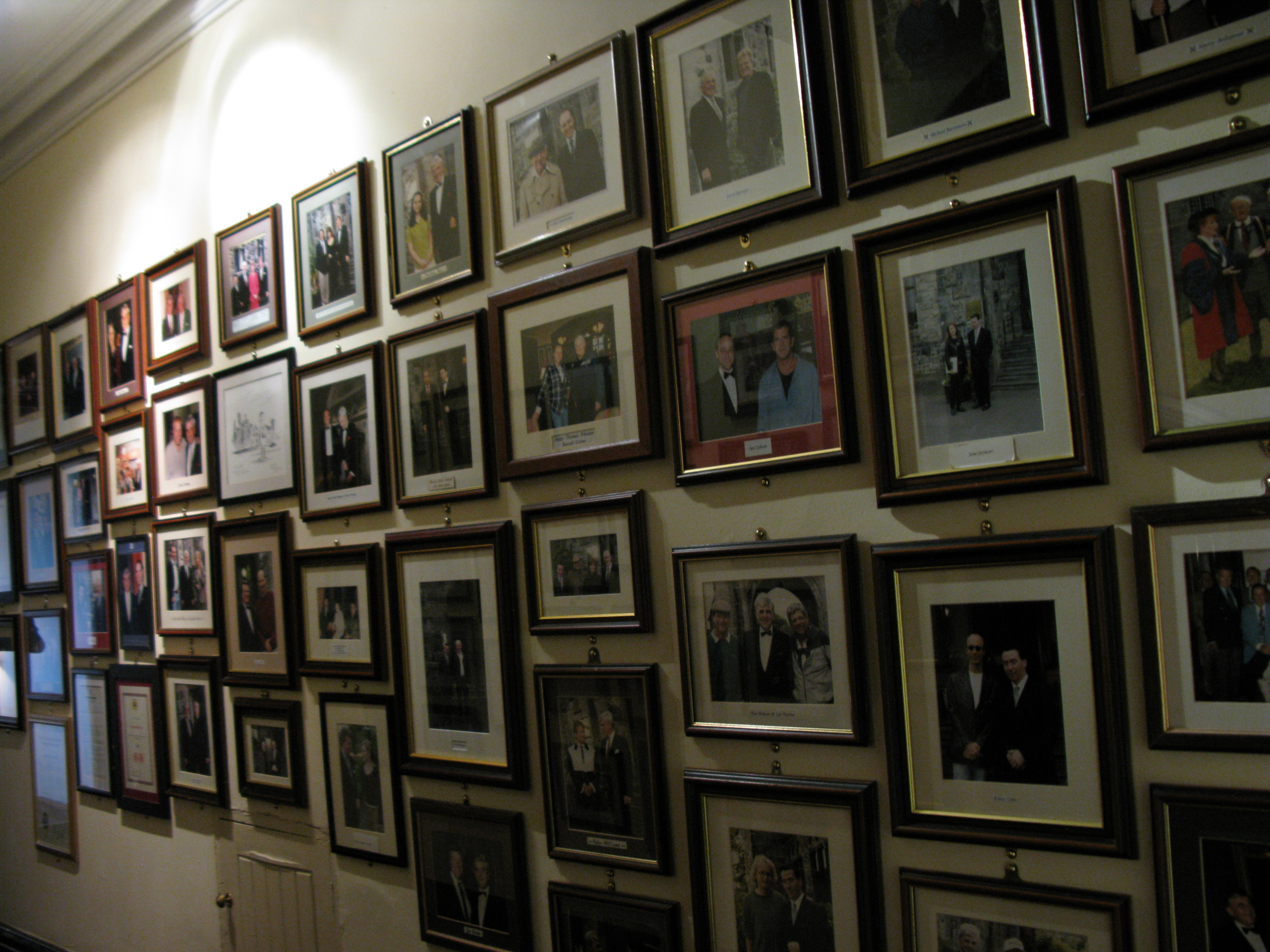
Photographs of notable guests line the walls of a second-floor gallery.

As of 2013, most of the guests come from the United States (60 percent; 30 percent from Ireland; 10 percent from elsewhere), with Californians accounting for the largest share.

In January 2014, the new owners acquired neighbouring Lisloughrey Lodge, with plans to add it to the resort. Ashford Castle itself was scheduled to reopen on 14 March after major refurbishment that began in early January.

The castle re-opened in April 2015 following major refurbishment. All 820 windows were replaced, a new lead roof installed, and its stonework repointed. Around €47m was spent on restoring the property.

In August 2015, Ashford Castle was voted world's best hotel by Virtuoso Travel Week; and in July 2015, third best world hotel by Travel + Leisure magazine, US.

In its time the castle has played host to a number of notable guests, including the Prince of Wales (later King George V) and his wife, the future Queen Mary; John Lennon; George Harrison; Oscar Wilde (whose father, Sir William Wilde, had an estate adjacent to Ashford, where the writer spent much of his childhood); President Ronald Reagan; Prince Edward, Earl of Wessex; US Senator Ted Kennedy; John Wayne; Maureen O'Hara; Robin Williams; Brad Pitt; Pierce Brosnan; and Prince Rainier III of Monaco and his wife, Grace Kelly. Professional golfer Rory McIlroy married Erica Stoll there on 22 April 2017.

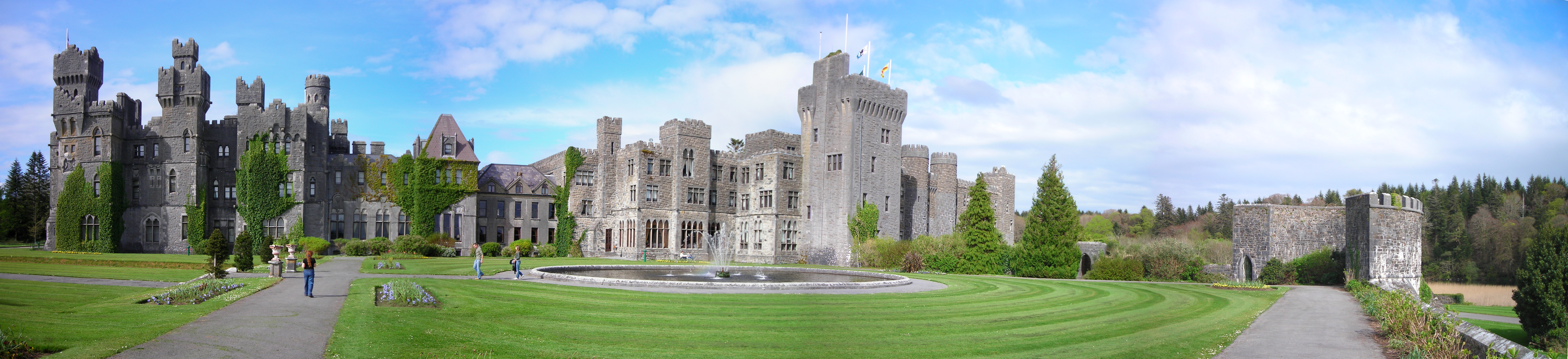
Panorama of Ashford Castle

== 2011 public right of way controversy ==
In September 2011, Gerry Barrett ordered that electric gates be installed, and subsequently shut, blocking a centuries-old public right of way over a bridge near the castle. The road is used daily by families living on the estate as well as local residents. After a letter to castle management asking for the right of way to be re-established was ignored, a group of 150 concerned locals and Ashford residents protested against the blocking of the route. The group was joined by local councillors and Éamon Ó Cuív, T.D. Barrett had earlier attempted to block the protest by taking out a High Court injunction. A case, taken by a local landowner to prevent the owners of the castle estate from "obstruction of a right of way", was heard in December 2011.
