= R334 road =

R334 road may refer to:

- R334 road (Ireland)
- R334 road (South Africa)
