= Neale, County Mayo =

The Neale An Éill
- Village
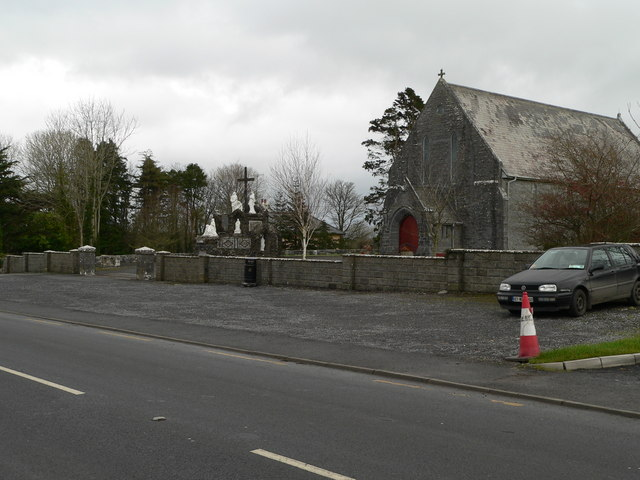
- St. John's Church

- Location in Ireland
- Coordinates: 53°34′23″N 9°13′30″W
- Country: Ireland
- Province: Connacht
- County: County Mayo
- Elevation: 60 m (200 ft)
- Time zone: UTC+0 (WET)
  - Summer (DST): UTC-1 (IST (WEST))
- Irish Grid Reference: M189588

Neale, also known as the Neale (Irish: An Éill), is a small village in the south of County Mayo in Ireland. It is located near the villages of Cong 4 km to the south-west, Cross 4 km to the south and the town of Ballinrobe about 5 km to the north.

== History ==
A number of archaeological sites and ruins surround the village, dating from prehistoric times to the Middle Ages. These include cairns, stone circles, raths, ringforts and crannogs.

The surrounding landscape also has a number of ruined Norman castles previously occupied by the McDonnell mercenaries. Adjacent to The Neale village is the home of the first Englishman to settle in the country – sheriff and map maker – John Browne. The Neale village also hosted the "uncrowned king of Ireland", Charles Stewart Parnell, and Michael Davitt during the Land League era. The system of organised ostracisation of overbearing landlords and agents – later termed Boycotting by Fr. John O'Malley (Parish priest in The Neale) - was first put into operation at Lough Mask House where Captain Charles Boycott attempted to raise the rents. Journalists from all over Europe and America converged on the tiny village to witness the non-violent resistance movement.

== Sport ==
In October 2012, the Neale GAA Junior team became the first team within the club to win the County Mayo Junior Club Championship, beating an Ardnaree team by 2–09 to 1–17 after extra time at MacHale Park in Castlebar. Having played Junior status for the previous 110 years, the Neale were then promoted to Intermediate level for the first time in 2013. In October 2019, the club claimed the County Intermediate Title for the first time, beating Ballyhaunis 1–12 to 1–11 in a closed final played in Castlebar.

== Follies and monuments ==
The Pyramid of The Neale is an architectural folly built in the form of a step pyramid around 1760. Listed on the Record of Protected Structures for County Mayo, it is a 30-foot structure rising from a series of steps from the base nearly 40 feet in width. John Kilmaine of Alcester, England, provides the following information on the structure: "It is said that the pyramid is constructed on the old tumulus. The building of the pyramid is attributed to Sir John Browne, the 7th Baronet and 1st Baron of Kilmaine, in memory of his brother, Sir George Browne. The structure, which at one time was crowned by a lead figure of Apollo, was designed by the Earl of Charlemont for his brother in law, Sir John Browne, The Neale". There are a few varying stories of the building of the Pyramid. One such story is that Lord Kilmaine was anxious to find a way of relieving the extreme poverty of his tenants in the post-famine years, so he employed several men to pick up the stones around the estate. He had those stones piled up and built into a pyramid. This provided the poor people with a little additional income. In the later years, a wind-vane adorned the top of the pyramid, so the landlord could indulge in his passion for meteorology and the recording of weather systems over a period of 30 years. The Office of Public Works refurbished the Pyramid in 1990.

Temple Monument It was in the 18th century that the Penal Laws were enforced and the great houses and estates of the landlords were built. The Neale estate was approximately 400 acres and was surrounded by a high double wall. Inside the wall, the landlord built a number of unusual monuments or follies. The Temple is an unfinished temple of carved stone. It was the last folly to be built in 1865 by John Browne, Baron of Kilmaine, in honour of his first title, Lord Mount Temple. It is hexagonal and has 6 plain Doric columns; at one time, it had a timber roof. The base of the Temple, with the arches. Dates from an earlier time, and it is probable that the columns were placed on top of the old structure to give it elevation. The Temple was used by the ladies of the Big House for family meetings, knitting and relaxing. In addition to relaxing at the Temple, the ladies also walked "The Cavendish Walks", both inside and outside the estate.

Gods of the Neale About 200 yards east of The Neale village, inside the old demesne wall and close to the ruins of Lord Kilmaine's house, is a stone monument that is known as The Gods of The Neale. A collection of stone slabs with carvings of three mythical figures, a griffin, a unicorn and an angel, is enshrined in a stone structure. The inscription refers to the sculptured figures as Deithe Feile, Diana Ffeale, and The Gods of The Neale, from which The Neale gets its name. Among other mythological characters mentioned in the inscription is Loo Lave Adda (Lú Lamhfhada), whose hand is reputed to be buried under a nearby "Long Stone".

The Long Stone The Lia Lugha (Stone of Lu) is said to mark the burial place of Lugh Lamhfhada (Lu of the Long Hand) who was slain in the Battle of Moyturna. Lu was the son of Nuadha, King of the Tuatha De Danann. The stone is at the fork of the roads from Cross and from Cong, south of the Neale village. It is known locally as the Long Stone

== Amenities ==
Facilities and services in the area include a grocery shop, bars and restaurant. Gibbons Bar, a pub in the area with a thatched roof, has been listed on the Record of Protected Structures by Mayo County Council.

St John the Baptist Church & Calvary is in the centre of the village, built in 1875, the foundation for which, was laid by Rev Fr. O'Malley. Fr. O'Malley Millennium Park was named in honour of Fr. John O'Malley for his role with the Land League movement. He built the old Neale school in 1883 and the existing church in 1875. A monument was erected from the stone from the old school and church in 2000.

== See also ==
- List of towns and villages in Ireland
