= Edward Jennings (VC) =

Irish recipient of the Victoria Cross (c. 1820–1889)

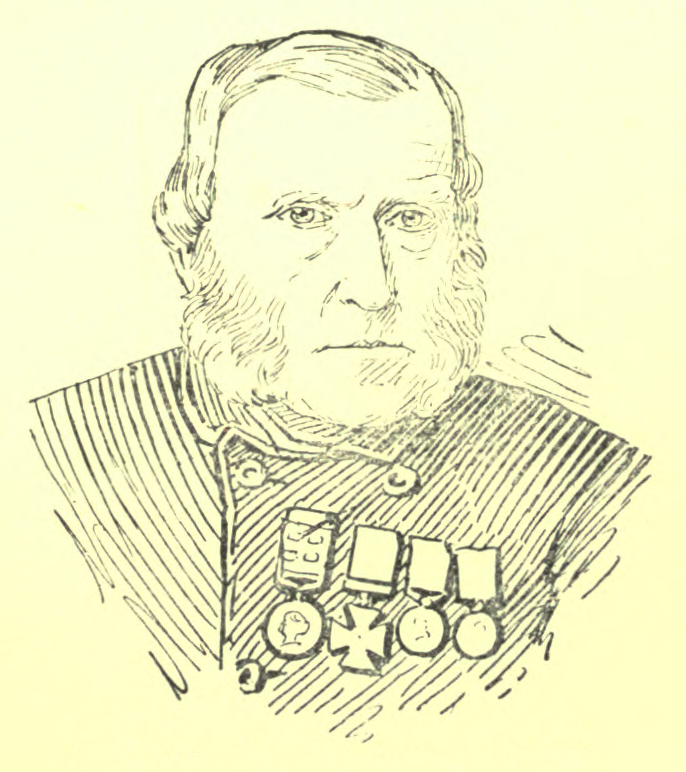
- Born: c. 1820; Ballinrobe, County Mayo
- Died: 10 May 1889; North Shields, England
- Burial place: Preston Cemetery, North Shields
- Military career
- Allegiance: United Kingdom
- Branch: Bengal Army
- Rank: Rough Rider
- Units: Bengal Artillery
- Conflicts: First Anglo-Sikh War; Indian Mutiny
- Awards: Victoria Cross

Edward Jennings VC (c. 1820 – 10 May 1889) was an Irish recipient of the Victoria Cross, the highest and most prestigious award for gallantry in the face of the enemy that can be awarded to British and Commonwealth forces.

== Details ==
He was approximately 37 years old, and a Rough-Rider in the Bengal Artillery, Bengal Army during the Indian Mutiny when the following deeds took place at the Relief of Lucknow for which he was awarded the VC:

Elected respectively, under the 13th clause of the Royal Warrant of the 29th of January, 1856, by the Officers and non-commissioned officers generally, and by the private soldiers of each troop or battery, for conspicuous gallantry at the relief of Lucknow, from the 14th to the 22nd of November, 1857.

== Legacy ==
For most of his life Edward Jennings was employed by the local council as a road sweeper and must have fallen on hard times as he sold his Victoria Cross to a private collector. His Victoria Cross is owned by the Royal Artillery and is not on public display.

Edward Jennings VC died on 10 May 1889 and was buried in an unmarked pauper's grave, one of 190,000 bodies interred in Preston Cemetery, North Shields, North East England. In 1997 an appeal was launched to raise the necessary £2000 to place a headstone on Edward Jennings grave. A memorial service at graveside took place on 10 September 1997 to dedicate the new headstone.
