= Clonbur =

Village in County Galway, Ireland

An Fhairche Clonbur
- Village
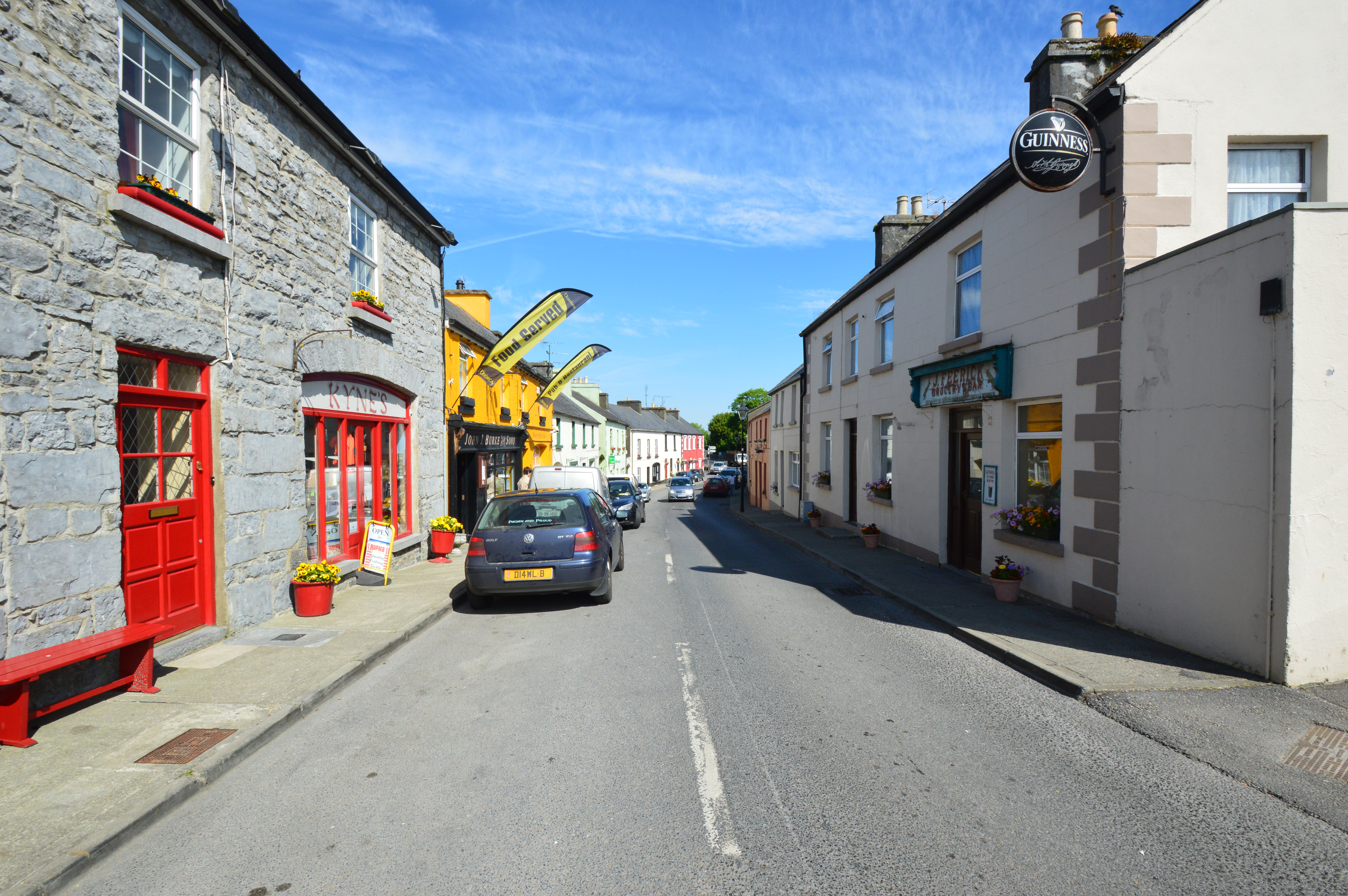
- Village centre in 2012

- Location in Ireland
- Coordinates: 53°32′43″N 9°21′55″W
- Country: Ireland
- Province: Connacht
- County: County Galway
- Elevation: 20 m (66 ft)
- Irish Grid Reference: M093559
- An Fhairche is the only official name. The name Clonbur has no official status.

An Fhairche (locally An Fháirthí), or Clonbur in English, is a Gaeltacht village in Connemara, County Galway, Ireland.

The village of Clonbur sits between Lough Corrib and Lough Mask. Two kilometres to the west rises Mount Gable where, according to legend, the hordes of Firbolg gathered on the hilltop before their clash with the Tuatha Dé Danann at the Battle of Moytura.

Clonbur also contains the ruins of the Petersburg Estate. This estate, originally the seat of the Lynch family, was later owned by the Guinness family. The house and yard buildings have since been renovated and now function as an outdoor education centre.

== Geography ==
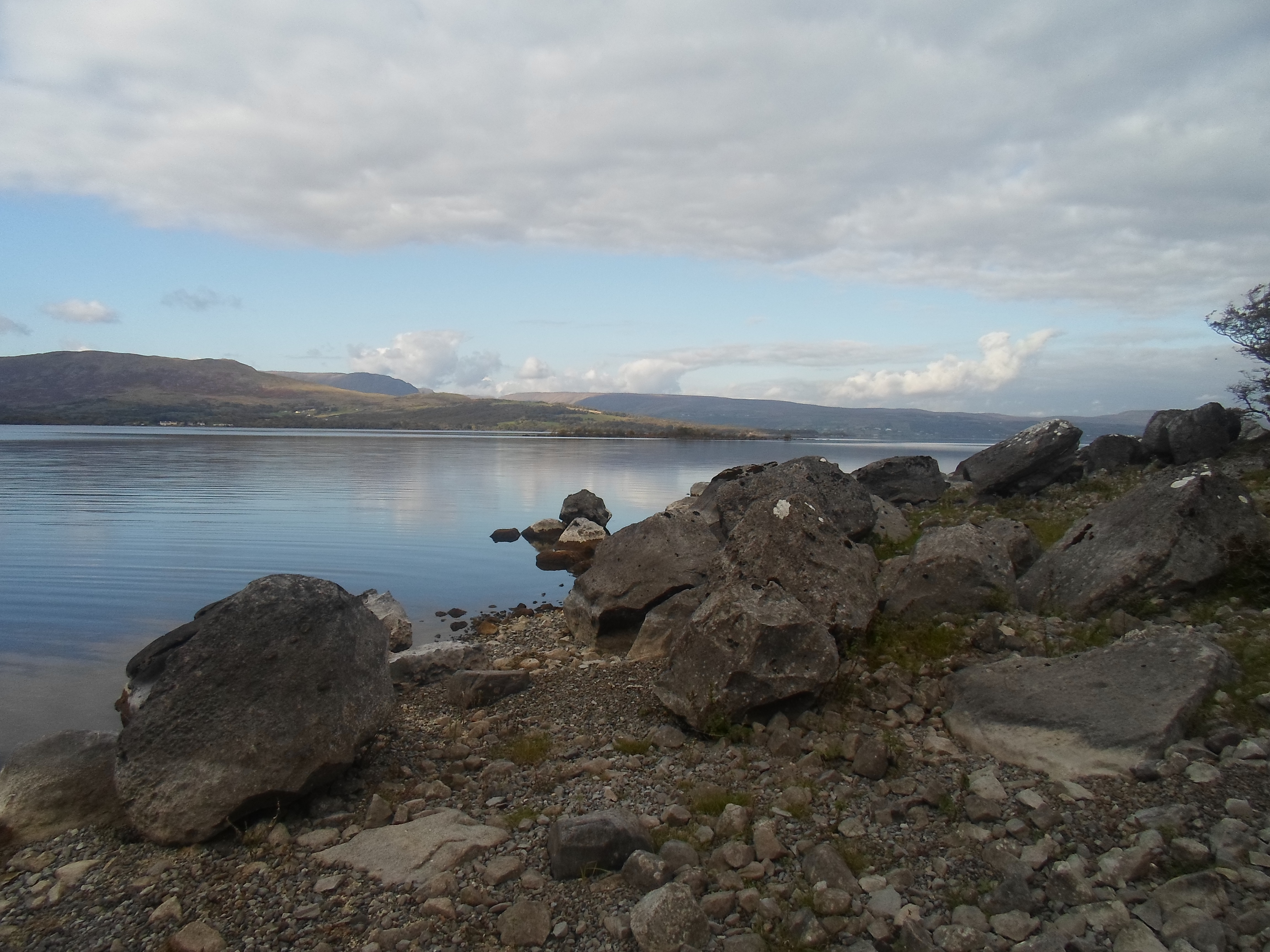
Lake in Petersburg Outdoor Education Centre, Clonbur

=== Lough Coolin ===
Located at the foot of Mount Gable, three miles west of Clonbur, Lough Coolin is accessible via the villages of Ballyveane and Kilbeg Upper in County Galway. Beside the lake are the stone cottage ruins of an old village. The lake was known for white trout until the early 1960s when pike were added to the lake by a local fisherman. Pike and perch are now the only fish in the lake. A stream from Lough Coolin flows into Lough Mask. Coolin Lake provides fresh water for the village of Clonbur.

=== Mount Gable ===
Mount Gable (1370 feet) is a hill which dominates the isthmus between Lough Corrib and Lough Mask and overlooks one of the major routes into Connemara from the east. The starting point for a walk is approximately 2 km from the village of Clonbur. Views of both Lough Mask and Lough Corrib can be had from the top of Mount Gable. Mount Gable is accessible through the villages of Ballyveane and Kilbeg Upper.

== History ==
=== Development ===
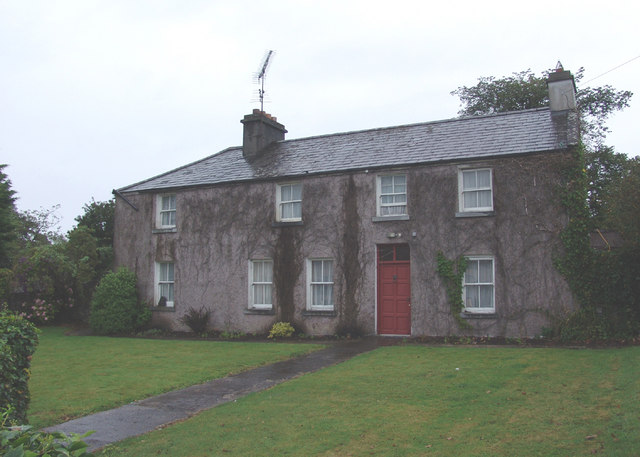
Poliska House in An Fhairche (Clonbur) is a former dispensary built c. 1860

Evidence of ancient settlement in the area includes a number of ringfort, cairn burial and enclosure sites in the townlands of An Fhairche, Ballykine Lower and Ballykine Upper.

A number of public buildings within Clonbur village, including the former market house and Church of Ireland church, date from the mid-19th century. The latter, designed by architect William Atkins and built in 1846, is now used as a heritage centre. The modern Catholic church, St. Patrick's Church in the Roman Catholic Archdiocese of Tuam, was built on the site of an earlier church

=== Ross Hill Abbey ===
In Ross Hill cemetery stands the ruins of Teampall Brendain. Traditionally associated with Brendan the Navigator (Brendan of Clonfert), this ruin is sited within an ancient oval enclosure known as a caiseal or cashel. The western end of the ruin is of early Christian origin and in the trabeated doorway can clearly be seen the inclined jambs which were distinctive to that era. This structure replaced a wooden and less durable structure which is thought to be the site of Brendan's original monastic settlement.

Within 30 meters of the western doorway is an Ogham stone.

The site, in the Ross Hill estate, was once the property of the unpopular Earl of Leitrim. The estate later became the property of the Guinness family.

=== Ballykine (Ballykyne) Castle ===
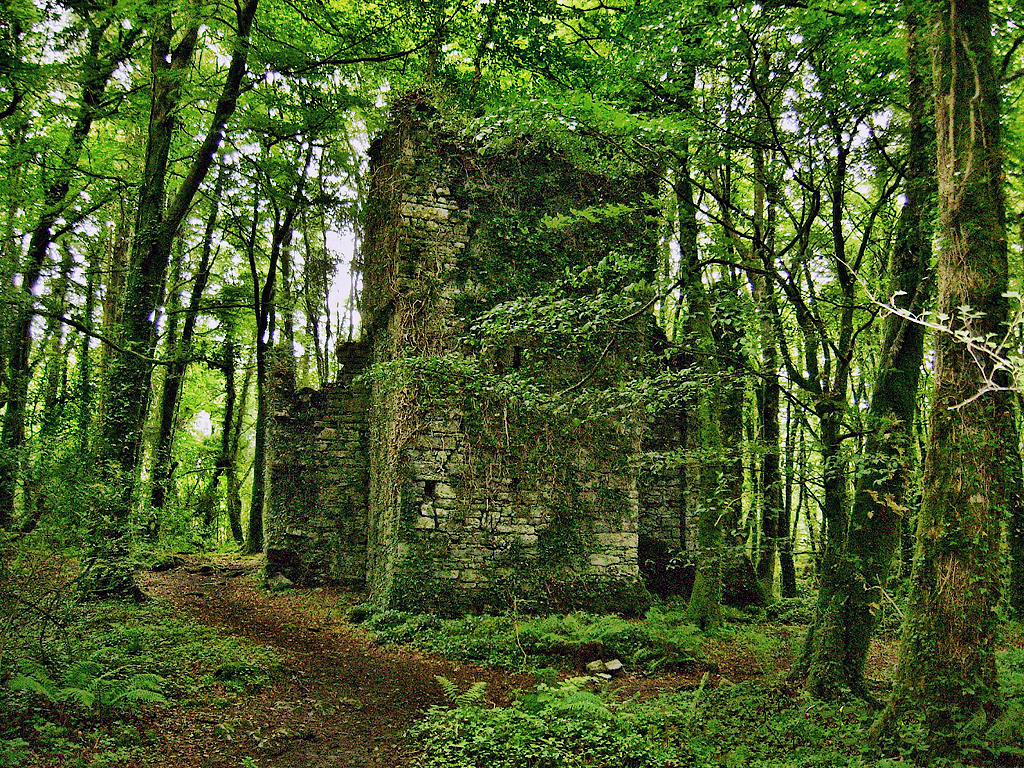
The ruins of Ballykine Castle lie to the east of Clonbur village

The ruins of Ballykine (Ballykyne) Castle lie approximately 1.5 km (0.93 mi) east of Clonbur. One of a series of five fortifications from Ballinrobe to Ballindonage, it was originally owned by the O'Kynes. Dated to the 13th century, the castle was seized for the Crown in 1571 by Edward Fitton, the then President of Connacht. For a period, the de Burgos (Burke family) held it and later gave it to the MacDonnells (Scottish mercenaries) as service booty or bonnacht. Eventually it passed from Sir Richard O'Donnell to Sir Benjamin Lee Guinness and it became part of the Guinness estate.

Architecturally, the castle has some unusual features, including a trabeated doorway which predates much of the rest of the structure by several hundred years. Other sections of stonework are also not fully bonded together, indicating several later additions to the original building.

== Sport ==
The local Gaelic Athletic Association (GAA) club is Cumann Peile Naomh Padraig. The club has won several Gaelic football titles, including the 2011–12 All-Ireland Junior Club Football Championship.

== See also ==
- Connacht Irish
- List of towns and villages in Ireland
