= R331 road (Ireland) =

Road in County Mayo, Ireland

R331 road
- Bóthar R331
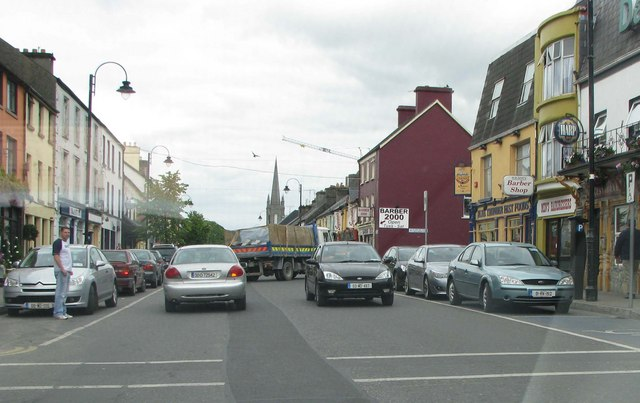
- Main Street, Claremorris, on the R331

Route information
- Length: 22.5 km (14.0 mi)

Location
- Country: Ireland
- Primary destinations: County Mayo; Claremorris (N60 road); Rooskeybeg; Tagheen; Crosses the River Robe; Hollymount; Crosses the River Robe, twice; Cappacurry; Ballinrobe (N84 road)

Highway system
- Roads in Ireland; Motorways; Primary; Secondary; Regional

The R331 road is a regional road in southeast County Mayo, Ireland. The route connects the towns of Claremorris and Ballinrobe, and links the N60 road with the N84 road.

The official description of the R331 from the Roads Act 1993 (Classification of Regional Roads) Order 2006 (Statutory Instrument 188 of 2006) reads:

R331: Claremorris - Ballinrobe, County Mayo

Between its junction with N60 at Inner Relief Road in the town of Claremorris and its junction with N84 at Bridge Street Ballinrobe via Ballyhaunis Road, Main Street and James Street in the town of Claremorris; Rooskeybeg, Tagheen, Hollymount, Cappacurry; and Abbey Street at Ballinrobe all in the county of Mayo.

The road is 22.5 kilometres (14.0 mi) long and it crosses the winding River Robe three times on its journey (map of the road).

== See also ==
- List of roads of County Mayo
- National primary road
- National secondary road
- Regional road
- Roads in Ireland
