= 2011–12 All-Ireland Junior Club Football Championship =

- Sponsor: Allied Irish Bank
- Champions: Clonbur (1st title)
- Runners-up: Derrytresk

The 2011–12 All-Ireland Junior Club Football Championship was the 11th staging of the All-Ireland Junior Club Football Championship since its establishment by the Gaelic Athletic Association.

The All-Ireland final was played on 12 February 2012 at Croke Park in Dublin, between Clonbur and Derrytresk. Clonbur won the match by 1-08 to 1-07 to claim their first ever championship title.

== All-Ireland Junior Club Football Championship ==
=== All-Ireland final ===
12 February 2012 Final	Clonbur	1-08 - 1-07	Derrytresk	Croke Park
