= Cong Canal =

Canal in Ireland

- Lock Number 3, The Cong Canal
- Interactive map of Cong Canal
- Country: Ireland

Specifications
- Length: 6 km (3.7 miles)
- Locks: 3
- Status: derelict

History
- Principal engineer: John McMahon
- Date of act: 1842
- Construction began: 1848

Geography
- Start point: Lough Corrib
- End point: Lough Mask

The Cong Canal is a derelict canal in the village of Cong, County Mayo. Ireland. It was abandoned unfinished in 1854 and is popularly known as 'The Dry Canal'.

It was intended to create a navigable connection between Lough Corrib at Cong and Lough Mask, six kilometres to the north. The canal formed part of the larger Corrib, Mask and Carra Drainage and Navigation project intended to provide land drainage to the Loughs Corrib, Mask and Carra catchments and open up a navigation from the sea at Galway Bay to those lakes.

== History ==
The design and construction of the works was carried out by the government organisation known as the Board of Works (also known as The Commissioners of Public Works) over the period 1844 to 1859. Survey work commenced in June 1844 and a report with a proposed design was published in March 1846. This was one of four works of navigation part funded by the Treasury during the famine years (1845 to 1849) in Ireland. The other three were Lough Neagh and the River Bann in County Antrim; the Ballinamore-Ballyconnell Canal linking Lough Erne to the River Shannon across County Leitrim; and Lough Oughter and Lough Gowna in County Cavan. The navigation from the sea at Galway Bay to Lough Corrib and through Lough Corrib was completed as planned.

The navigation work on the Cong Canal, in Lough Mask and on the River Robe was abandoned in 1854 when an instruction issued from the Board "to suspend the execution of all navigation works in this division of the district, and complete only such as were necessary for the regulation of the waters of Lough Mask, for drainage purposes."

The abandoned canal has remained an enigma ever since. The canal was brought to wide public attention in 1872 by the writer William Wilde who coined the name ‘The Dry Canal’. The Board of Works stated that the project was halted because it was proving to be too expensive, that labour had become scarce, and that railways had rendered canals redundant. The local folk memory has retained a different story down through the nearly two centuries since the canal was abandoned: it says that the engineers failed to take account of the cavernous nature of the limestone in the district and when they realized this, the work was halted.

The overall Corrib-Mask project was initially planned as a straightforward drainage and navigation project but, due to the potato famine it was rushed forward as a Famine relief project to provide employment to the starving locals. Significant changes were made to the original proposed design and basic errors were made at the detailed design stage. Full account was not taken of the effect on milling interests of running off flood storage, and to compound this error, flood runoff was then directed into the tailraces of the mills of Cong. Legal action against the Board by the millers was successful. But an even greater error was made at the head waters of the canal where, as the local folk memory correctly records, the Board failed to take account of the cavernous nature of the limestone in the district. The result was that at times of low flow, all flow discharged through underground passages leaving the canal high and dry. Rather that admit its mistake, the Board opted for obfuscation and erected Sluices to essentially block up the channel it had just spent six years excavating through solid rock. The huge rusting sluices may still be seen at Killimor about six kilometres north of Cong village, but they are difficult to access.

== Legacy ==
The canal has become something of a tourist attraction in the village of Cong, County Mayo where a fully completed lock, the excavated dry channel and other heritage features may still be seen. In summer periods, the entire six kilometre stretch of the canal is completely dry and it is possible to hike along it. In winter, flood waters rush down the channel to an overflow just north of Cong village. The lower one-and-a-half kilometre stretch of the canal at Cong village remains dry at all times.

== See also ==
- Canals of Ireland
- Irish Waterways History
- YouTube video 'The Cong Canal Today - Visiting a long forgotten Irish waterway...' published 2024

== Sources ==
- O'Reilly, P. (2003). "Cong Canal". Rivers of Ireland: A Flyfishers Guide. Fly Fishing International Series. Stackpole Books. ISBN 978-0-8117-0072-6.
- Mulvihill, M.L. (2003). Ingenious Ireland: A County-by-County Exploration of the Mysteries and Marvels of the Ingenious Irish. Simon & Schuster, Limited. pp. 308–309. ISBN 978-0-684-02094-5.
