= River Robe (Ireland) =

River in County Mayo, Ireland

Coordinates: 53.633888°N 9.275113°W

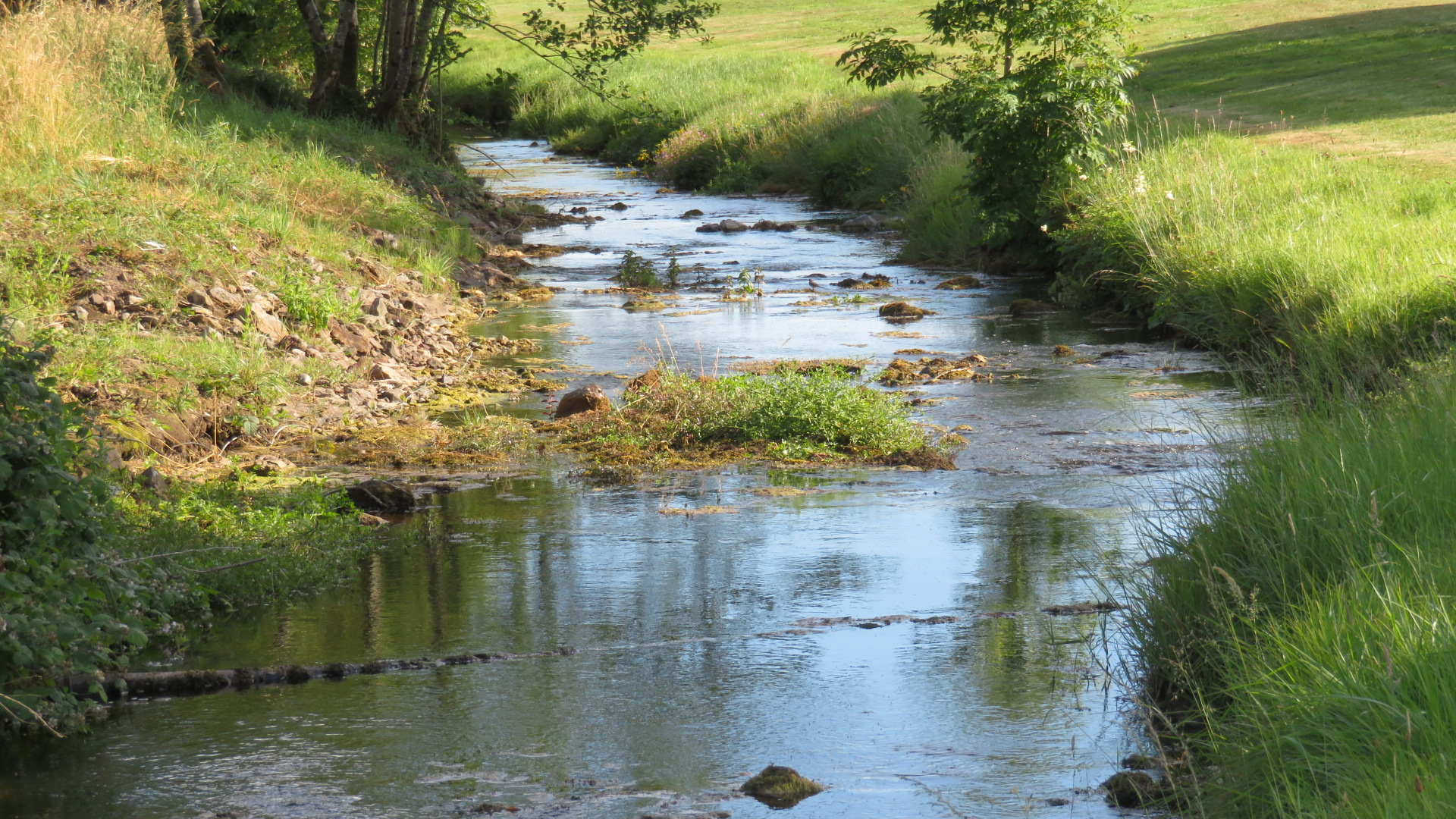
- The Robe entering the village of Brickens
- Etymology: Old Irish rodba, "aggressive"
- Native name: Abhainn an Róba

Physical characteristics
- Source
  - location: Bekan Parish, County Mayo, Ireland
- Mouth
  - location: Lough Mask
- Length: 64 km (40 mi)
- Basin size: 320 km^{2} (120 sq mi)

The River Robe (Irish: Abhainn an Róba) is a river in County Mayo, Ireland. It rises near Ballyhaunis, then flows generally west for 64 kilometres (40 mi), where it drains into Lough Mask.

The river is the longest tributary of Lough Mask, and it drains 320 square kilometres of south Mayo.

The Robe's Environmental Protection Agency River ID is 30_1579.

== Name ==
Mediaeval chronicles give the river's name in Irish as Rodhba, a name possibly derived from Old Irish rodba, "aggressive," referring to its fast flow.

== Course ==
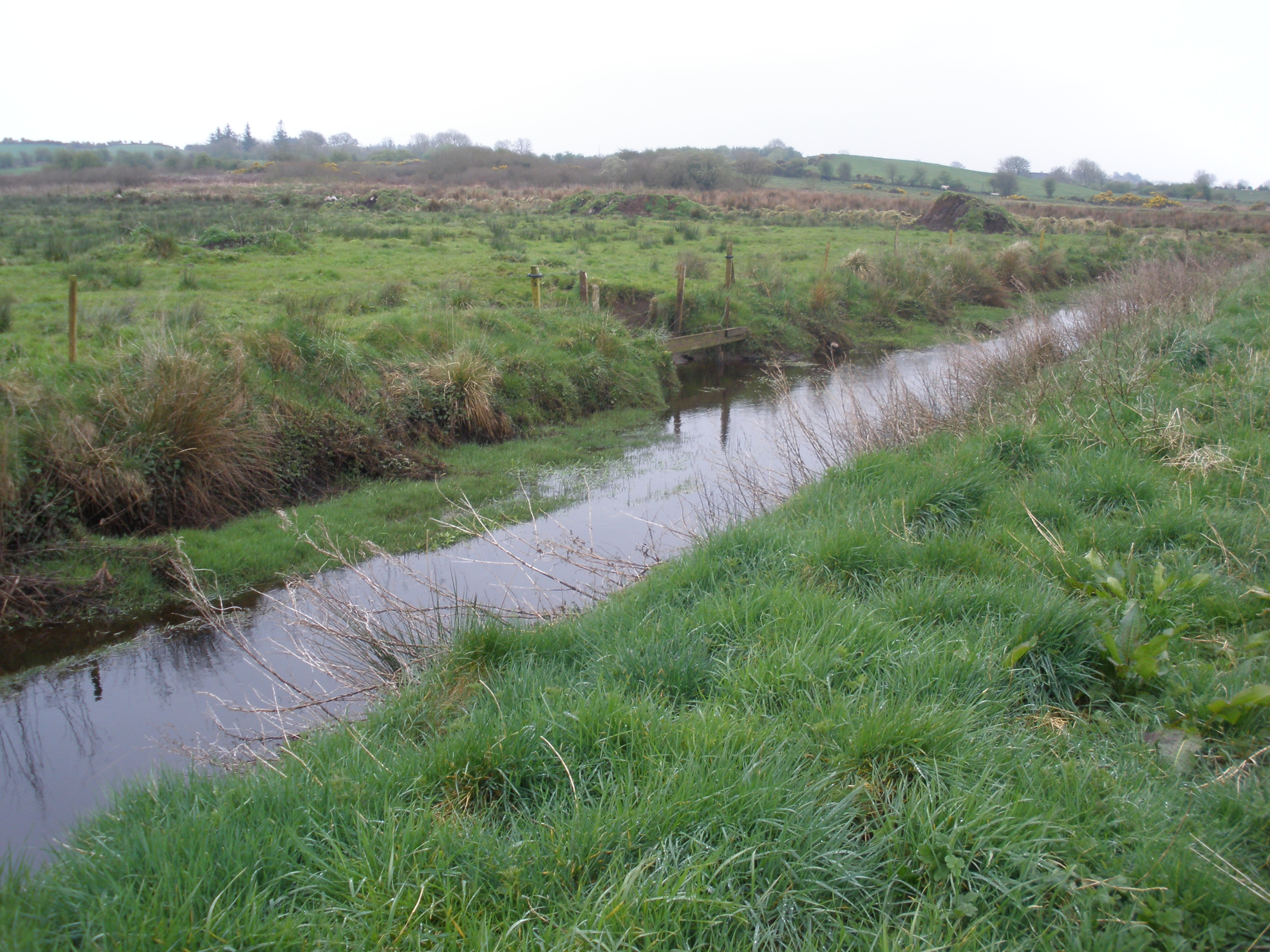
The Robe flowing through bogland in Keebagh, near its source.

The Robe rises about five kilometres southwest of Ballyhaunis and follows a meandering path southwest through the townland of Keebagh and Brickens village. It turns gently to the west between Tootagh and Garryduff and continues west between Claremorris and Ballindine. It meanders in serpentine coils beside the R331 road, passing Taugheen, from where it begins its southwesterly descent to Hollymount. From there, the river winds in broad loops before descending southwestwards into Ballinrobe (Irish: Baile an Róba, meaning 'town of the Robe'). The Robe empties into Lough Mask, four kilometres west of Ballinrobe, near Cushlough (Irish: Cois Loch, meaning 'beside the lake').

== See also ==
- Rivers of Ireland
- List of rivers of County Mayo
