= Cross, County Mayo =

Cross An Chrois
- Village
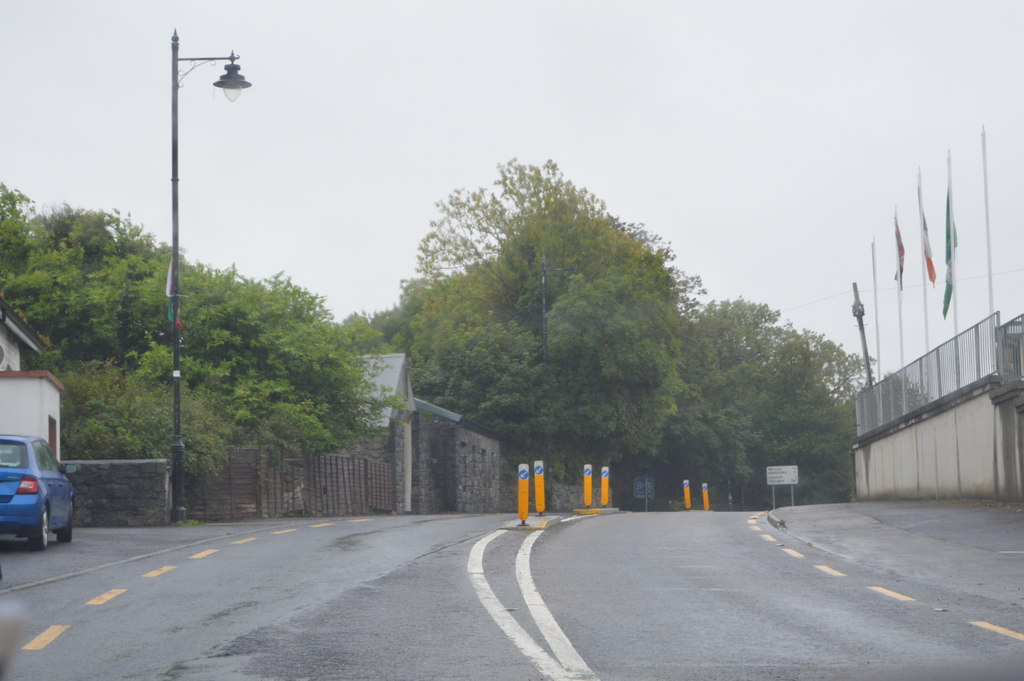
- The R334 road passes through Cross

- Location in Ireland
- Coordinates: 53°32′40″N 9°13′00″W
- Country: Ireland
- Province: Connacht
- County: County Mayo
- Time zone: UTC+0 (WET)
  - Summer (DST): UTC-1 (IST (WEST))
- Irish grid reference: M194556

Cross (Irish: An Chrois) is a village in the south of County Mayo, Ireland. The townlands of Cross East and Cross West lie within the civil parish of Cong and the historical barony of Kilmaine. The local Catholic church, the Church of the Sacred Heart, was completed in 1890. The nearby national (primary) school, Cross National School or Saint Feichín's National School, had an enrollment of 51 pupils as of 2025.

== See also ==
- List of towns and villages in Ireland
