= Ballinrobe =

Town in County Mayo, Ireland

Ballinrobe Baile an Róba
- Town
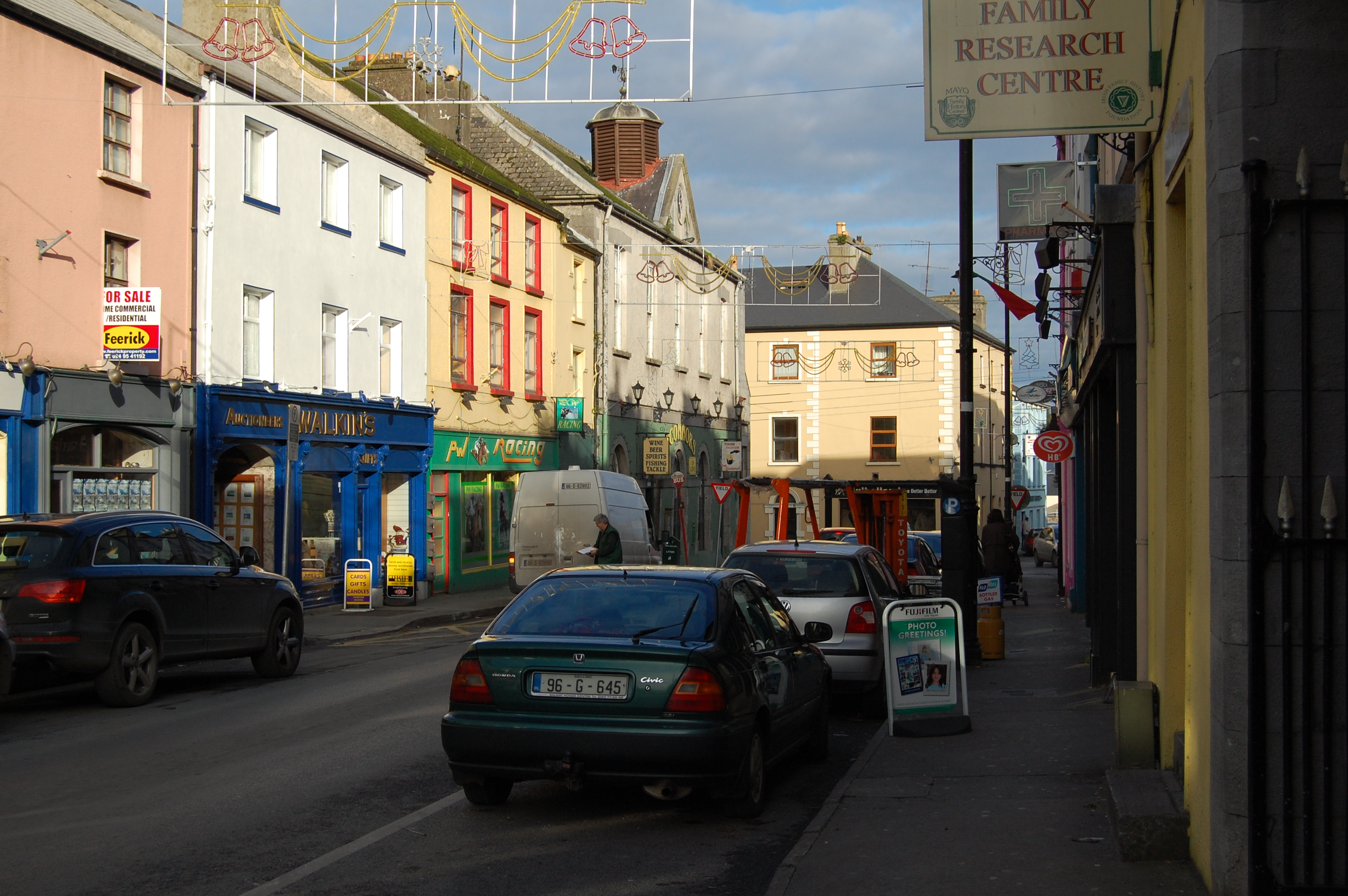
- Main Street, Ballinrobe

- Location in Ireland
- Coordinates: 53°38′00″N 9°14′00″W
- Country: Ireland
- Elevation: 45 m (148 ft)

Population (2022)
  - Total: 3,148
- Time zone: UTC±0 (WET)
  - Summer (DST): UTC+1 (IST)
- Eircode routing key: F31
- Telephone area code: +353(0)94
- Irish Grid Reference: M188643

Ballinrobe (Irish: Baile an Róba, meaning 'town of the (river) Robe') is a town in County Mayo in Ireland. It is located on the River Robe, which empties into Lough Mask two kilometres to the west. As of the 2022 census, the population was 3,148. The town is in a civil parish of the same name.

== History ==
=== Foundation and development ===
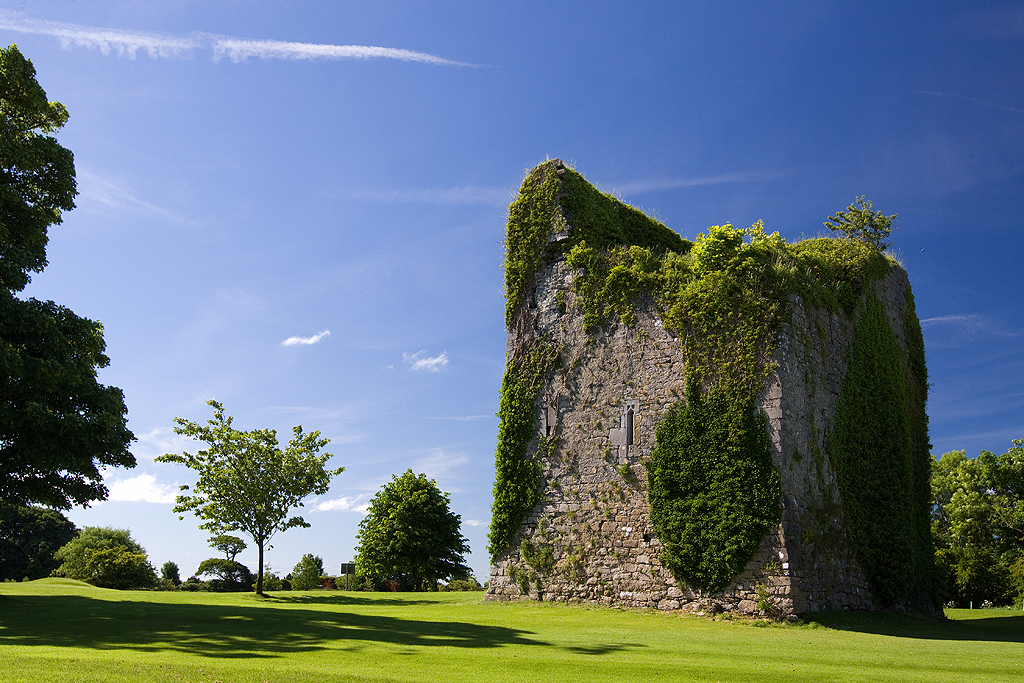
Cloonagashel Castle, historically owned by the House of Burke

Ballinrobe is considered to be one of the oldest towns in Mayo, dating to 1390. In 1337, the registry of the Dominican friary of Athenry mentions the monastery de Roba, an Augustinian friary whose restored ruins are one of the landmarks of the town today.

A Royal Patent granted to the people of Ballinrobe on 6 December 1606 by King James allowed the town to hold fairs and markets. Obtaining a market charter was an important step in the economic development of a town and required having a spokesperson who was in the king's favour. The town became the largest and most important in the area.

Market day in Ballinrobe was Monday. Each commodity had its special place in the town. Well into the mid-1900s, turf, hay, potatoes, turnips, and cabbage were sold on Abbey Street; poultry on Glebe Street; calves on Bridge Street; and cloth, flannel, woollen socks, lace, wheat, oats, and barley outside the Market House. There were special livestock fairs held at different times of the year for pigs, cattle, and sheep.

Ballinrobe Chronicle was the local newspaper published from 1866 to 1903.

On 17 May 1919, the first of the Republican law courts were set up in Ballinrobe.

The first court under the direct authority of the Dail sat at Ballinrobe, on 17 May 1920 and was reported with some pride in the national press.

Two Ballinrobe bakeries, Western Pride and Country Crust, merged in 1989 to form Irish Pride (later acquired by Pat the Baker).

=== Religion ===
In 1704, a new law required the registration of Catholic priests. The Catholic Church was suppressed throughout Ireland. There are no records for any Catholic rites in the area before 1831, however, some priests continued to perform the rites in secret. The name of one of them is known: Fr. Duffy ministered in Ballinrobe from 1696 until 1712. He was captured and deported to Spain, where he died. There appears to have been a number of other priests between 1649 and 1875, who were associated with the Augustine Abbey.

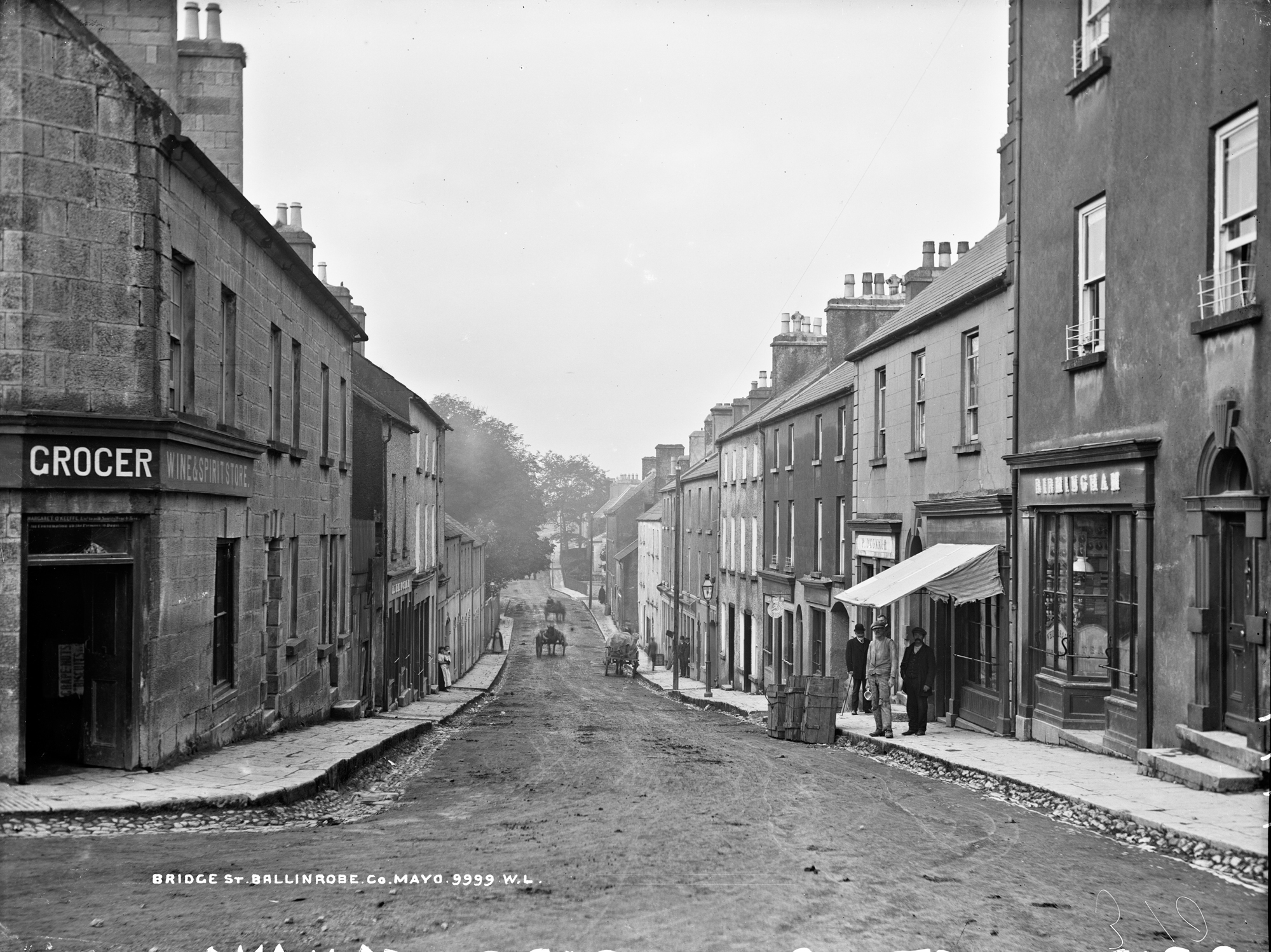
Bridge St. Ballinrobe (19th century)

Fr. Conway was appointed the first curate of Ballinrobe in 1847. He was the minister to both Ballinrobe and Partry for a number of years and was responsible for negotiating permission, with a Colonel Knox to construct St. Mary's Catholic Church on Main Street. The church was started under Fr. Conway in 1853. Subsequent curates were Fr. Hardiman and Dean Ronayne. Fr. Hardiman is credited with bringing the Mercy Order of nuns to Ballinrobe in 1851, and Dean Ronayne is credited with bringing the Christian Brothers there in 1876. The local Sisters of Mercy Convent was founded from Westport in 1851. Their mission included the education of children, visitation and care of the sick, and helping the poor.

=== Transatlantic flight by Lituanica II ===
In 1935, Feliksas Vaitkus landed his plane, Lituanica II, near Ballinrobe. He was the sixth person to make a successful flight over the Atlantic Ocean with a single engine, single seat airplane. Vaitkus fought terrible weather conditions and was helped considerably by hourly broadcasts from an Irish radio station. He learned that Dublin was fogged in, as well as all areas heading east as far as the Baltic Sea. He knew that he could not make it to Kaunas in Lithuania due to his low fuel supply, and being exhausted after a 23-hour struggle fighting the elements, he felt it was best to land somewhere in Ireland. Vaitkus spotted an open field at Ballinrobe and came down, with the airplane suffering extensive damage, but he himself suffered no injuries. Lituanica II was crated for shipment to Lithuania, where it was restored. He went to Kaunas, where he was given a hero's welcome.

== Demographics ==
Historical population
Year	Pop.	±%
1821	2,191	—
1831	2,604	+18.8%
1841	2,678	+2.8%
1851	2,162	−19.3%
1861	2,506	+15.9%
1871	2,408	−3.9%
1881	2,286	−5.1%
1891	1,852	−19.0%
1901	1,544	−16.6%
1911	1,585	+2.7%
1926	1,337	−15.6%
1936	1,416	+5.9%
1946	1,360	−4.0%
1951	1,257	−7.6%
1956	1,218	−3.1%
1961	1,165	−4.4%
1966	1,240	+6.4%
1971	1,272	+2.6%
1981	1,438	+13.1%
1986	1,270	−11.7%
1991	1,229	−3.2%
1996	1,309	+6.5%
2002	1,626	+24.2%
2006	2,098	+29.0%
2011	2,704	+28.9%
2016	2,786	+3.0%
2022	3,148	+13.0%

According to the 2016 census, the population of Ballinrobe was 91% white (including 1,841 white Irish [58.82%], 637 other white [20.35%] and 134 [4.82%] white Irish traveller), 0.38% black (12) and 5.18% Asian (162). Additionally, 2% (62) were from other ethnic or cultural background, while 9.01% (282) did not state their ethnicity.

== Culture ==
The Ballinrobe Agricultural Society hold their show usually at the end of August or early September. Ballinrobe Musical Society puts on a show annually in Ballinrobe Community School. The 3rd Mayo Boy Scout group is in Ballinrobe.

Genealogical records for the region (such as Church of Ireland, Roman Catholic, and civil documents; and gravestone inscription records) are held at the South Mayo Family Research Centre on Main Street.

Ballinrobe Livestock Mart is one of only two marts in County Mayo; it is held every Wednesday.

In an unusual move, the town’s 2026 St. Patrick’s Day parade included an “Epstein Files” float which depicted the abduction and rape of, ostensibly, underage girls. Recorded footage of this GUBU production was shared on social media including Facebook, Instagram and Reddit

== Built heritage ==
There are several renovated, historic structures in and around the town.

=== Bunadober Mill ===
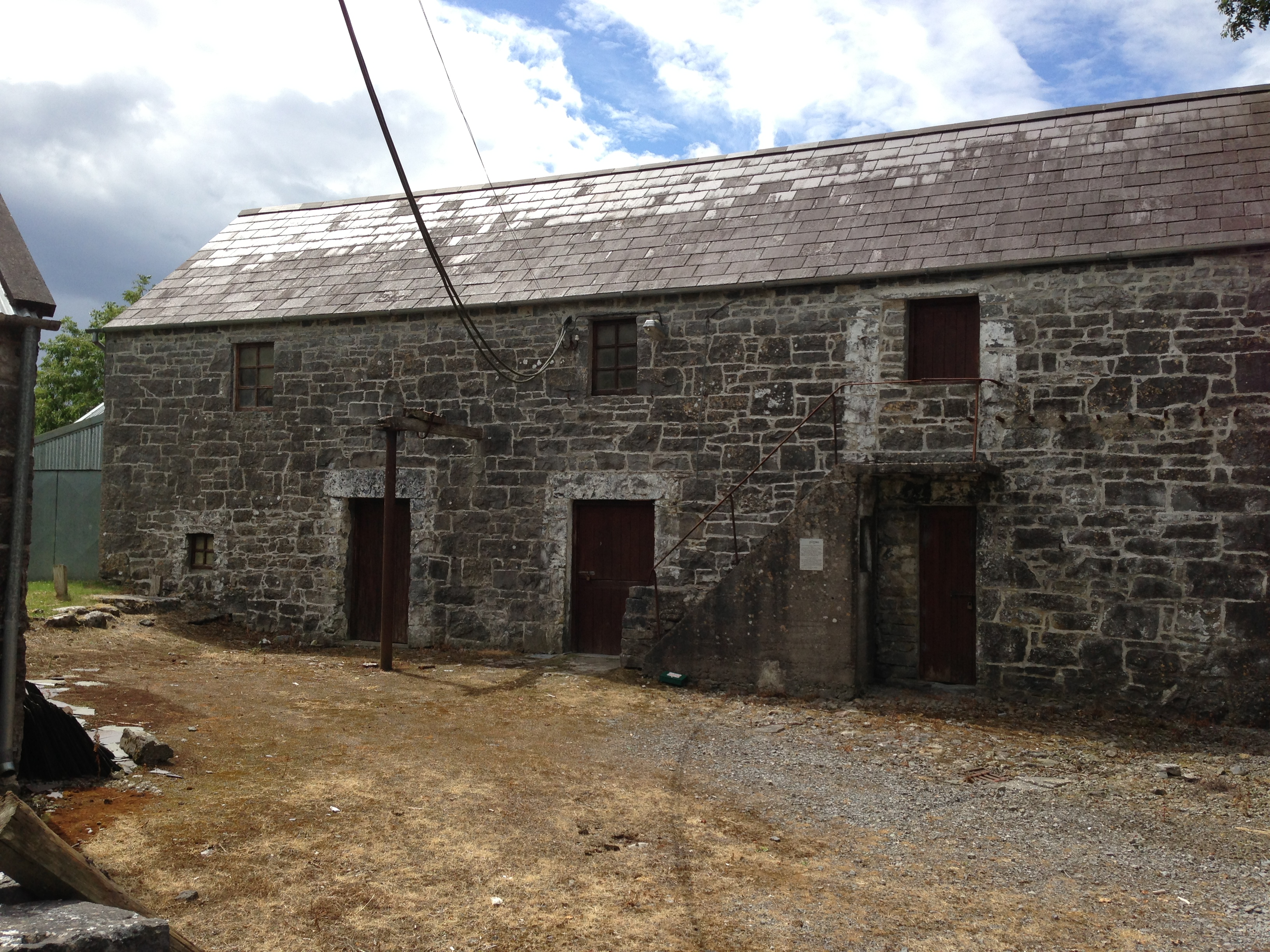
Bunnadober Mill

Bunadober Mill, also known locally as Moran's Mill, is located off the Ballinrobe/Clonbur road (L1613 and R345) close to Cairn Daithi and is a rare horizontal mill. The surrounding area was once titled Bun an dTobar (Bottom of the Spring Wells). The water flowing here arrives by an underground river. When tested with dye, it was established its mother source was the Bulkaun River that runs through part of Ballinrobe town.

The mill's location probably dates back many centuries. It contains mill machinery which once powered a range of operations, including blacksmithing, stone and wood cutting. An area near the mill was used in the 1800s and 1900s as a laundry for washing blankets from the two local barracks, the infantry and cavalry. From 1885, the mill was operated by William Walsh and several others. Around 1900, John and Bridget Moran took over, followed by their son, who built a corn drying kiln. In 1980, the mill closed and was taken under state protection in 1996 as a National Monument.

During a debate in Dáil Éireann in May 2018, Éamon Ó Cuív asked Kevin Moran (formerly the Minister for Public Expenditure and Reform) about the plans the Office of Public Works had for Bunadober Mill. Moran said that the OPW undertook work at the site to conserve the buildings and its historic contents, which involved repair of buildings, recording of artefacts and storing and cataloguing objects that were in vulnerable condition. He said that the external of the main buildings was in a 'reasonable condition', but several areas would require further attention before the building could be opened to visitors.

=== Bowers Walk ===
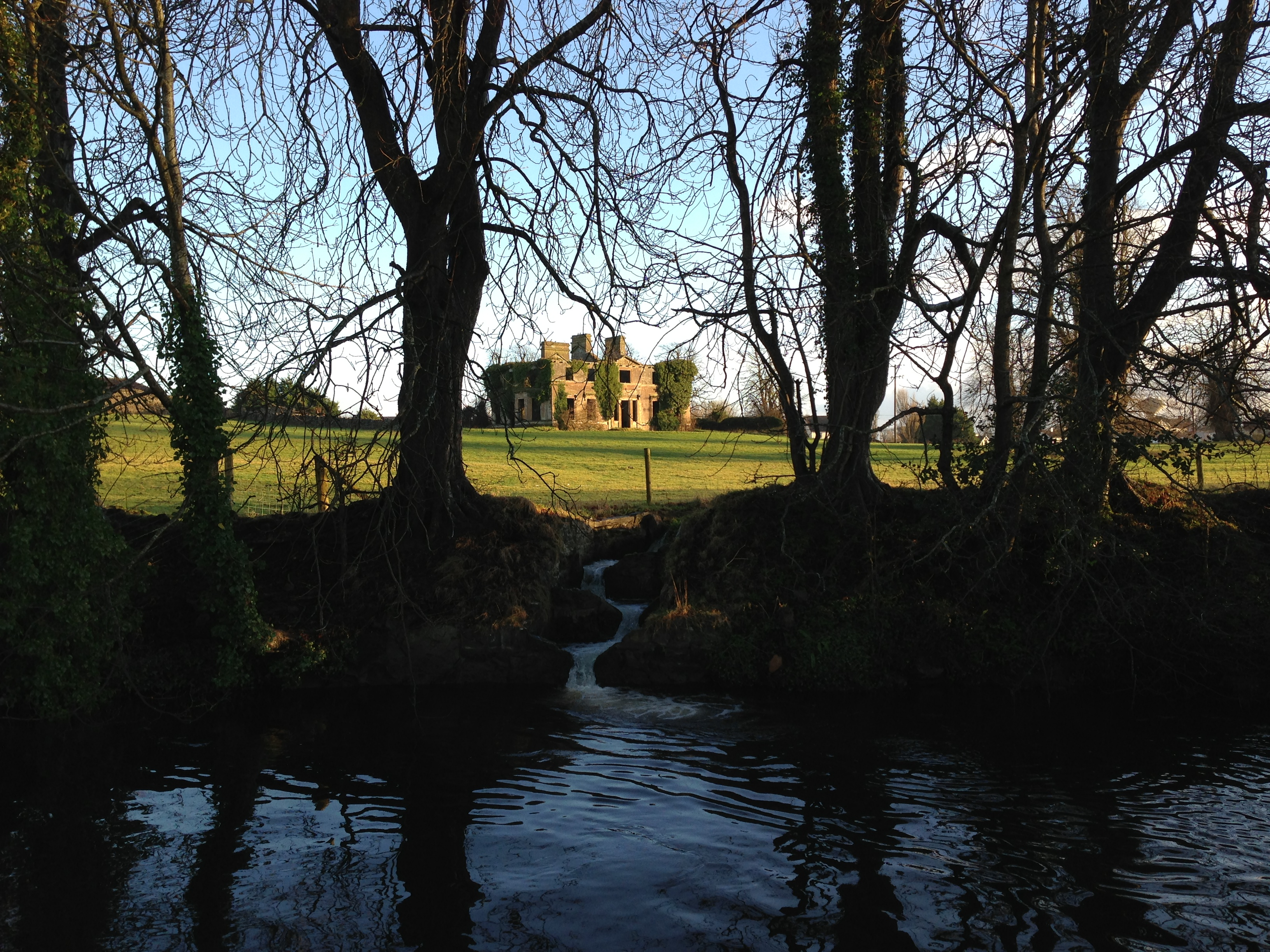
Cranmore House from Bowers Walk

There is a river walk called the Bowers Walk in Ballinrobe, which stretches for three kilometres along the River Robe. In 2019, it received funding to be developed and upgraded.

=== Cranmore House ===
Cranmore House was built in 1838 by Alexander Clendining Lambert who was an agent of the Knox family. He leased the land on which the house was built from Colonel Charles Nesbit Knox of Castle Lack, County Mayo. It is now a ruin, having had its roof removed in 1960, and is situated at the corner of Bowgate Street and Main Street.

=== Moore Hall ===
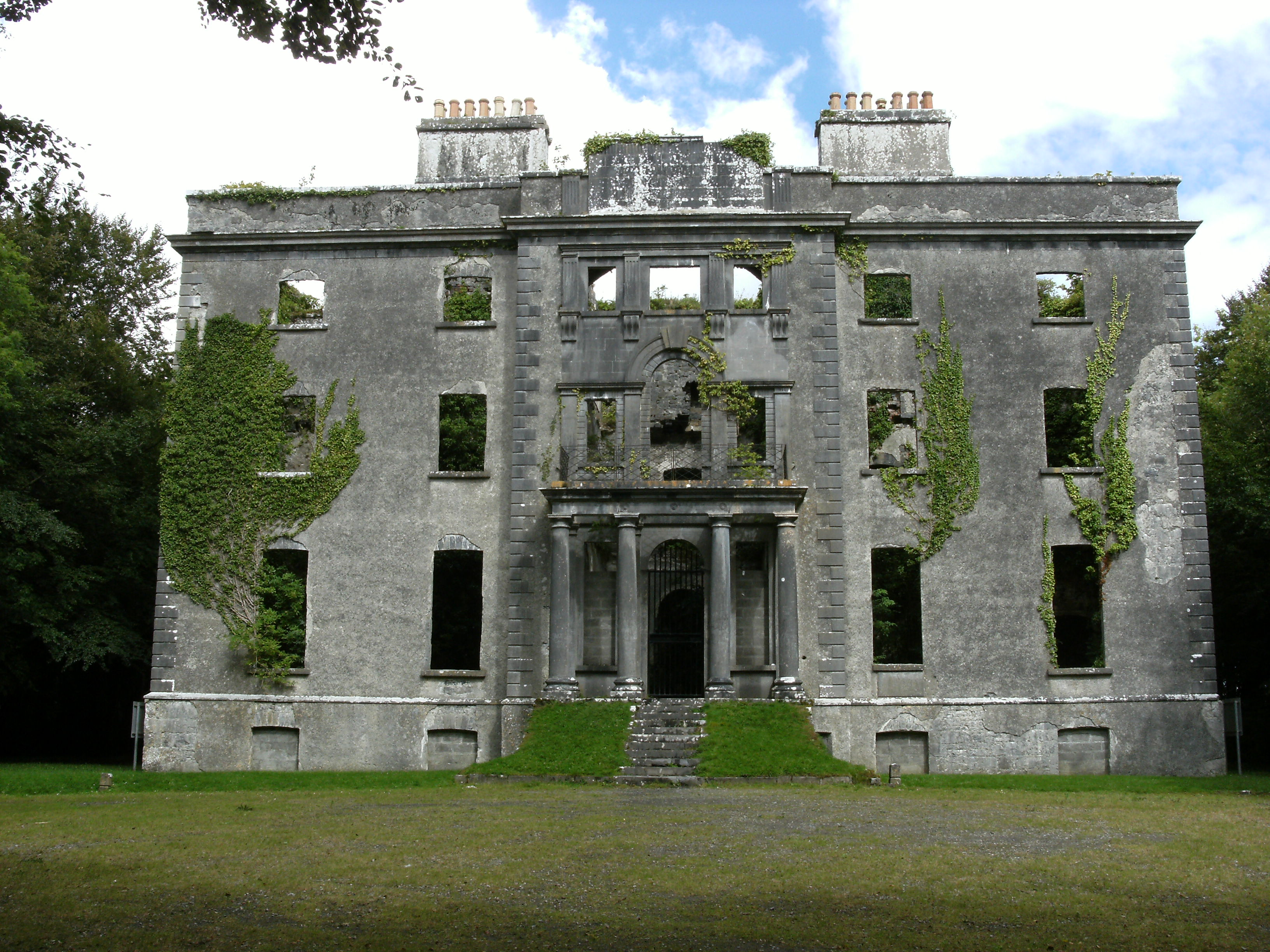
Moore Hall façade

Moore Hall was the house and estate of George Henry Moore and family, is situated six miles north of Ballinrobe. The Moores were an aristocratic Irish family who built Moore Hall between 1792 and 1795. The ruin of the house is not open to the public due to its poor condition, but forest walks and fishing is possible on Lough Carra.

=== Market House ===
In 1698, it was the site of a Commission of Inquiry which among other things, relocated property from Catholic to Protestant landlords. In 1716, the County Assizes (Civil and Criminal Courts) were held in Ballinrobe, most likely in the Market House. It was rebuilt in 1752 and became a marketing centre for local produce. Perishable goods such as butter, meat, and bread were sold in the lower floor, while the upper floor was used as a meeting hall. Ballinrobe District Court was housed in the Market House and it has been permanently closed since 1 September 2010.

=== St. Mary's Church ===
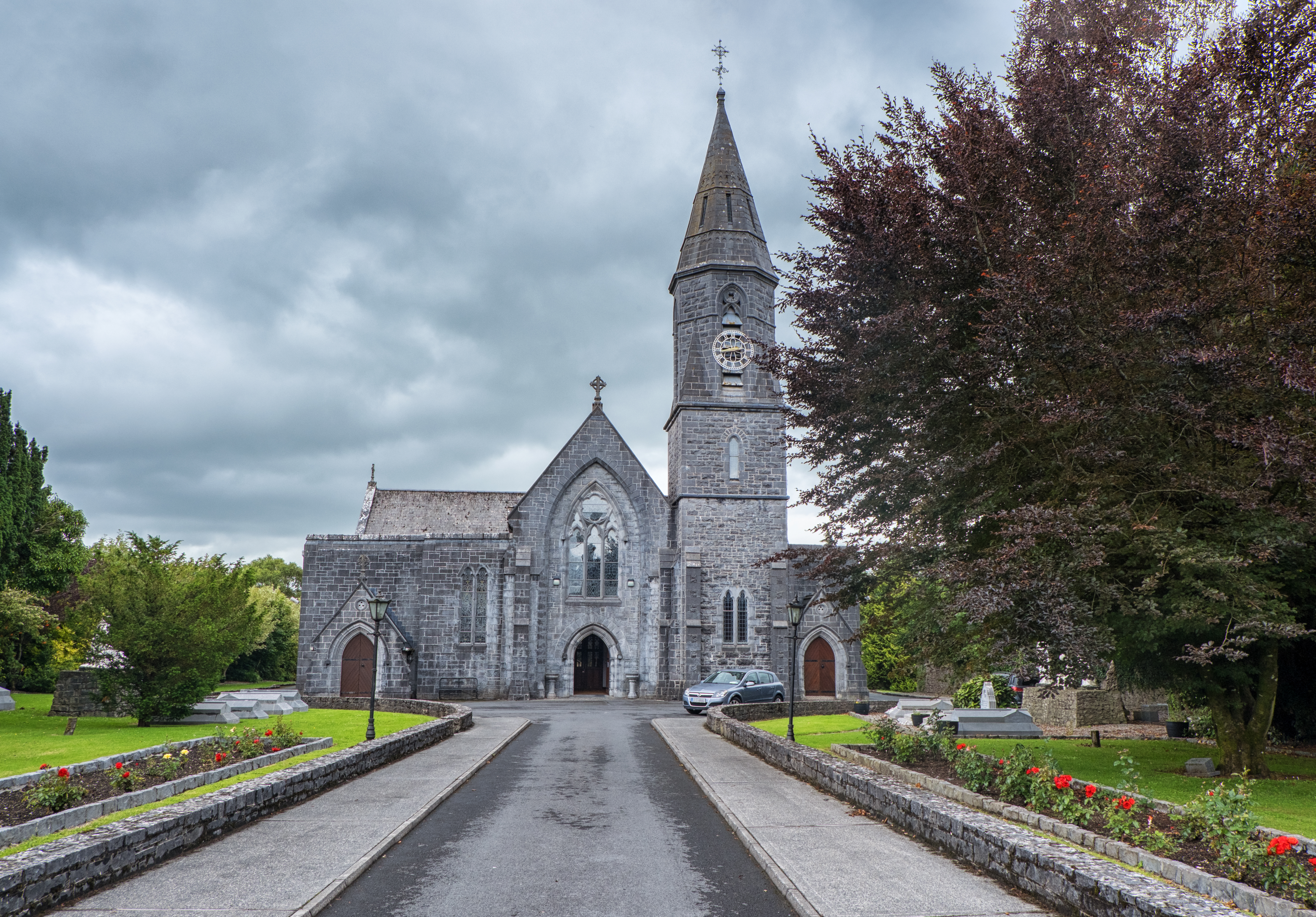
Front of St. Mary's Church

Saint Mary's Catholic Church contains nine low light windows by Harry Clarke which were commissioned by Monsignor d'Alton in the autumn of 1924. The windows depict scenes from the life of Jesus and Mary, and many Irish saints. Ballinrobe has one of the largest collections of Harry Clarke stained-glass panels in St. Mary's Church, with the first four inserted in 1924. This was followed by a further 12 panels in 1925 when Clarke visited the town to view his work. There are eight of his signed drawings for these windows in existence, with copies in Ballinrobe. For the 150th anniversary of St. Mary's a book describing the panels was published.

The windows form part of the Ballinrobe Heritage Walk which covers 30 historic sites in the town. These are marked with bronze ground markers and a free booklet is available in the local library.

=== Shoe Corner ===
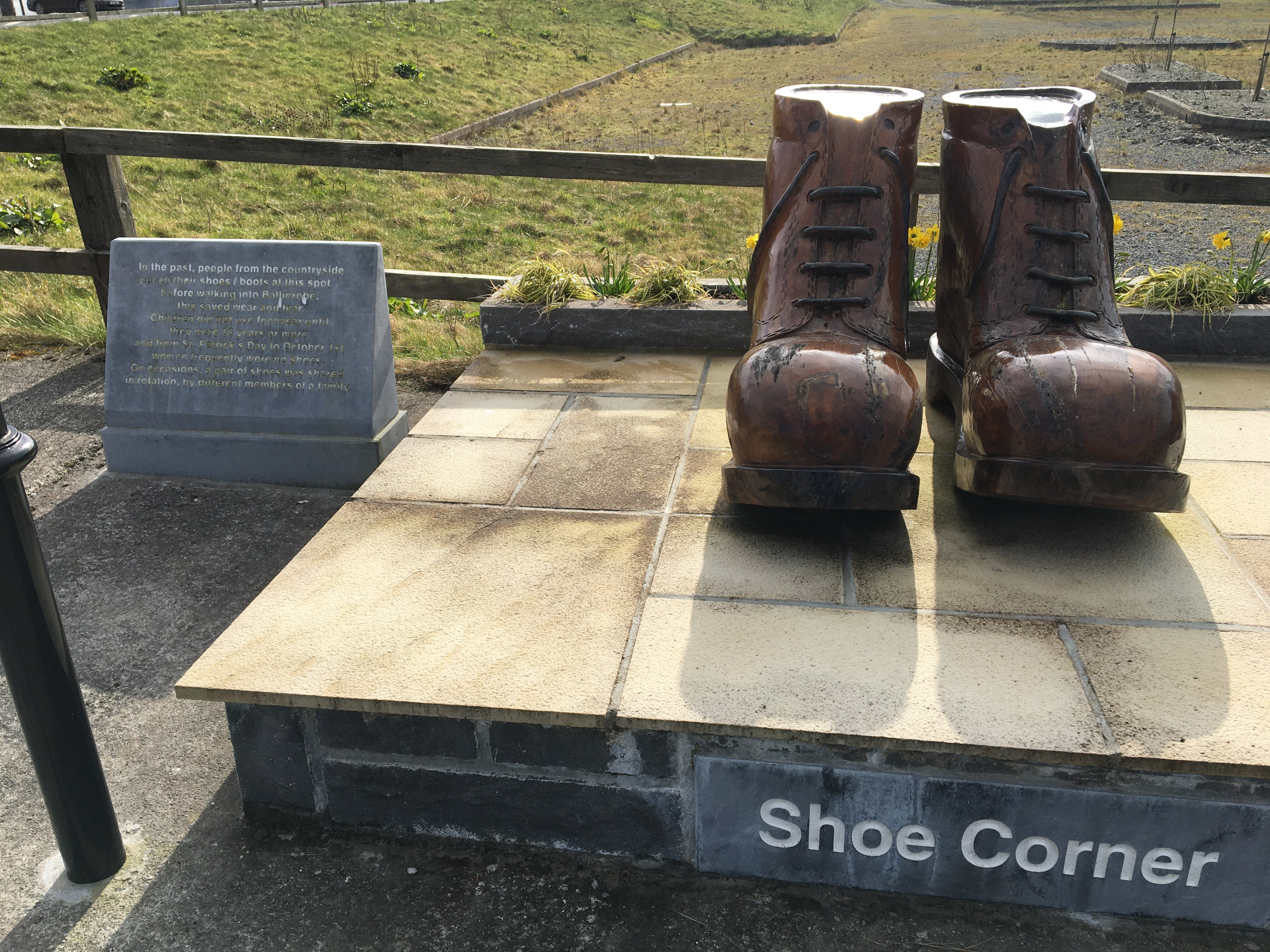
Shoe Corner Sculpture

It was common practice for people from the countryside to walk barefoot when heading towards Ballinrobe. When they reached the corner of the Neale Road and Lough Mask road, they would stop and put on their shoes. On the way home, people would sit and take their shoes off and walk home barefoot in order to protect their shoes from wear and tear.

On 29 November 2019, a sculpture was unveiled by the Minister for Rural and Community Development, Michael Ring, which serves as a reminder of Ballinrobe's history. The shoe sculpture was carved by Tommy Kerrigan, a local artist, who carved the pair of boots using solid oak.

The plaque beside the sculpture states the following:

In the past, people from the country side put on their shoes / boots at this spot before walking into Ballinrobe. This saved wear and tear. Children did not use footwear until they were 16 years or more and from St. Patrick's Day to October 1st, women frequently wore no shoes. On occasions, a pair of shoes were shared in rotation, by different members of a family.

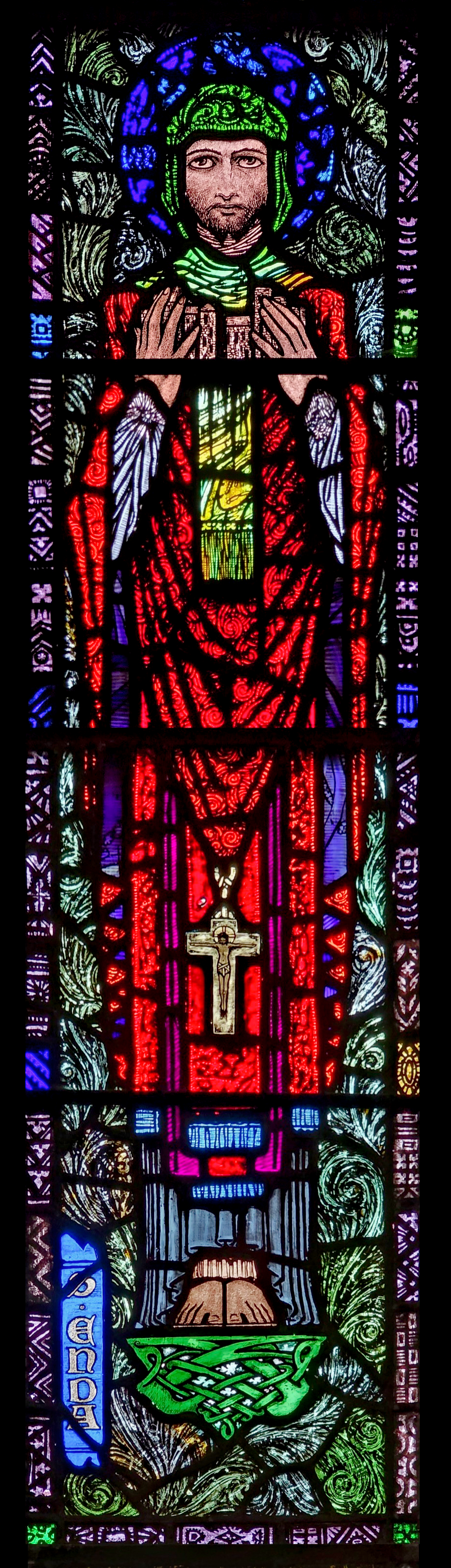
Window of Saint Enda of Aran by Harry Clarke in St. Mary's Church

=== Union Workhouse ===
In 1839, the Union Workhouse of the Poor Law Union of Ballinrobe was founded. Ballinrobe suffered greatly during the Great Famine of 1845 to 1849. With 2,000 inmates at the height of the famine, the workhouse was so overcrowded that on 23 March 1847, The Mayo Constitution reported:

In Ballinrobe the workhouse is in the most awfully deplorable state, pestilence having attacked paupers, officers, and all. In fact, this building is one horrible charnel house, the unfortunate paupers being nearly all the victims of a fearful fever, the dying and the dead, we might say, huddled together. The master has become the victim of this dread disease; the clerks, a young man whose energies were devoted to the well-being of the union, has been added to the victims; the matron, too, is dead; and the respected, and esteemed physician has fallen before the ravages of pestilence, in his constant attendance on the diseased inmates. This is the position of the Ballinrobe house, every officer swept away, while the number of deaths among the inmates is unknown; and we forgot to add that the Roman Catholic chaplain is also dangerously ill of the same epidemic. Now the Ballinrobe board have complied with the Commissioner's orders, in admitting a houseful of paupers and in striking a new rate, which cannot be collected; while the unfortunate inmates, if they escape the awful epidemic, will survive only to be the subjects of a lingering death by starvation!

Ninety-six people died in just one week in April 1849. The dead were buried in unmarked, shallow graves, located just outside the boundary on the southwest of the ruins. In 1922, during the Irish Civil War, a great deal of the structure was burned, although the main portion remains to this day.

== Transport ==
=== Road ===
Ballinrobe lies some 48 km (30 mi) north of Galway, on the N84 road from Galway to Castlebar. A bypass for the town has been proposed. The town is linked to Claremorris by the R331 road.

=== Bus ===
A bus service runs three times a day between Galway and Ballina, and passes through Ballinrobe and Castlebar.

=== Rail ===
Ballinrobe railway station opened on 1 November 1892, the terminus of a branch line from Claremorris. The station closed to passengers on 1 June 1930, but remained open for goods traffic, particularly livestock, until final closure on 1 January 1960. The station building is now a private residence.

== Sport ==
Ballinrobe Racecourse is the only racecourse in Mayo. The town has a long horse racing tradition. It hosted a steeplechase in 1834 and there are records of meetings as far back as 1774. The current track has been there since 1921. The racecourse was awarded best racecourse in Ireland for 2012 and 2023 by Horse Racing Ireland.

Ballinrobe Golf Club is the oldest in Mayo, formed in 1895. Cloonacastle Estate, which dates back to 1238, became the new home for the club during its centenary year in 1995.

Flanagan Park, which has a floodlit pitch, is the home of Ballinrobe Gaelic Athletic Association (GAA) club. Moytura Hurling Club, which was formed in 2006, plays on the Ballinrobe Community School pitch. The Green is the home of Ballinrobe Town Football Club and Ballinrobe Rugby Club.

Ballinrobe and District Angling Club, Lough Mask Angling Club, and the Partry Angling Club are three fishing clubs around Ballinrobe. The World Cup fishing competition takes place each year at the August bank holiday weekend.

== Notable people ==
- Charles Boycott (1832–1897) was a British land agent whose ostracism by his community around Ballinrobe gave rise to the term "boycott".
- Andrew Boyle (1818–1871), born in Ballinrobe, eventually made his way to the United States where, after multiple adventures, he became a prominent resident and landowner in early Los Angeles. The Boyle Heights neighborhood on the eastside of the city carries his name to this day.
- Noël Browne (1915–1997), the first inter-party government's minister for health, lived on Church Lane in his youth. He attended the local Christian Brothers School. Shocked by the absence of antenatal care for pregnant woman, and the resulting infant mortality rates in Ireland, he proposed free access to health care for mothers and children in a new "mother and child scheme".
- Emer Colleran (1945–2018) was a microbiologist, academic and environmental advocate.
- James Cuffe (1707–1762) of Elmhall and Ballinrobe, was a landowner in County Mayo. In 1742 he succeeded his father-in-law as a member of parliament for County Mayo in the Irish House of Commons, sitting until 1760.
- Peter Ford (born 1962) is a former Mayo footballer and manager of the Galway GAA and Sligo GAA football teams.
- Edward Jennings (VC) (1820–1889) was born in Ballinrobe. He was in the Bengal Army during the Indian Mutiny when he was awarded the Victoria Cross for bravery.
- William Brooke Joyce (24 April 1906 – 3 January 1946), known by his nickname Lord Haw Haw, was descended from farmers from Ballinrobe, and he ran a public house there for a number of years in the early 20th century. He was convicted of one count of high treason in 1945, and he was hanged on 3 January 1946, making him the last person to be executed for treason in the United Kingdom.
- John King (1865–1938) from Currabee, Ballinrobe was a sailor in the United States Navy and one of only 19 in history to receive the Medal of Honor twice.
- Henry Blosse Lynch (1807–1873), was born at Partry House and grew up on his family's 1,500-acre estate. He became a decorated explorer in Africa and the Middle East and was a navy commander.
- Rory O'Neill, a drag queen who performs as "Panti Bliss", is from Ballinrobe. He has performed all over the world, appeared on television, hosted Alternative Miss Ireland, and runs a nightclub in Dublin called Pantibar.
- Donal Vaughan is a former Mayo footballer who is a local business owner in Ballinrobe.
