= Lough Mask =

Lake in Counties Mayo and Galway, Ireland

- Loch Measca (Irish)
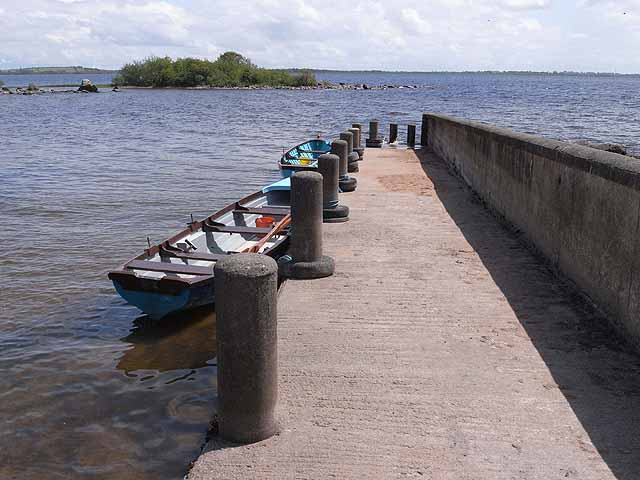

- Location of Lough Mask in Ireland
- Location: County Mayo, County Galway
- Coordinates: 53°37′N 9°21′W
- Lake type: Limestone lake
- Catchment area: 938.4 km^{2} (362.3 sq mi)
- Basin countries: Ireland
- Max. length: 16.1 km (10.0 mi)
- Max. width: 6.4 km (4.0 mi)
- Surface area: 83.43 km^{2} (32.21 sq mi)
- Average depth: 15 m (49 ft)
- Max. depth: 58 m (190 ft)
- Water volume: 1.3 km^{3} (1,100,000 acre⋅ft)
- Residence time: 0.28 years
- Surface elevation: 20 m (66 ft)

Lough Mask (Irish: Loch Measca) is a limestone lake of about 83 km^{2} (32 sq mi) in Counties Mayo and Galway, Ireland, north of Lough Corrib. Lough Mask is the middle of the three lakes, which empty into the Corrib River, through Galway, into Galway Bay. Lough Carra flows into Lough Mask, which discharges through the Cong Canal and underground passages in the limestone bedrock of the district. The flows from the underground passages and the Cong Canal come together at the village of Cong to form the River Cong which flows into Lough Corrib.

Lough Mask is the fourth largest lake, by area, in Ireland and the sixth largest lake in the island of Ireland. The eastern half of Lough Mask is shallow and contains many islands. The other half (Upper Lough Mask) is much deeper, sinking to a long trench with depths in excess of 50 metres. Lough Mask has a mean depth of 15 m (49 ft), and a maximum depth of 58 m (190 ft). Its water volume of 1.3 km^{3} (1.1 million acre⋅ft) is the largest in the Republic of Ireland and the second largest on the island of Ireland (after Lough Neagh).

== History ==
In 1338 Sir Edmond de Burgh was drowned in the lake by his cousin Sir Edmond Albanach Bourke of County Mayo, at the end of the Burke Civil War (1333–1338). He was captured at Ballinrobe and taken to Oilean-an-lara (the Earls Island) where he was killed.

According to a side-note on the manuscript containing the oldest copy of 'Tóruigheacht Dhiarmada agus Ghráinne' ("The Pursuit of Diarmuid and Gráinne") (Royal Irish Academy Ms. 24.P.9), Irish scribe Dáibhídh Bacach ("lame David") Ó Duibhgeannáin was living and working on Oileán Ruadh ('Red Island') on Lough Mask in the house of Tadhg Og O Flaherty on 1 April 1651.

The "Lough Mask Murders" of 1882 were a notorious incident in the Land War in which a grandfather and grandson acting as bailiffs were killed by tenant farmers and their bodies dumped in the lake.

== Legend ==
According to local legend, a banshee haunts Bly Island, a small island in the lough. There have also been rumored sightings of a banshee around the shore of the lough as well as other forms of paranormal activity.

== Fishing and recreation ==
The lake is popular for its trout fishing. The World Cup Trout Fly Fishing Championship takes place annually on Lough Mask at Cushlough Bay near Ballinrobe.

Petersburg Outdoor Education Center is situated on the shore of the lough, close to Bly Island. The center uses the lake for numerous water sports including kayaking, canoeing and sailing.

== Other ==
"Loch Measca" was taken as the pen-name of Séan Seoighe (John Joyce) in Eachtra múinteóra an Irish-language memoir published in 1929.

== See also ==
- List of loughs in Ireland
- River Robe
