= Weather of 2009 =

Global weather activity of 2009 profiles the major worldwide storms, including blizzards, tornadoes, ice storms, tropical cyclones and other meteorogical events, from January 1, 2009, to December 31, 2009. Wintery storms are events in which the dominant varieties of precipitation are forms that only occur at cold temperatures, such as snow or sleet, or a rainstorm where ground temperatures are cold enough to allow ice to form (i.e. freezing rain). It may be marked by strong wind, thunder and lightning (a thunderstorm), heavy precipitation, such as ice (ice storm), or wind transporting some substance through the atmosphere (as in a dust storm, snowstorm, hailstorm, etc.). Summer storms including flooding, severe thunderstorms and extratropical cyclones (which can occur in summer or winter) are also included in this list to a certain extent.

As this occurred a heat wave and/or unforeseen monsoon weather also hit parts of Australia in 2009 and 2010. Victoria, the scene of horrific bushfires the year before, had a far colder summer, with hot weather arriving more than a month later than usual in 2009. August 17 saw a dust storm at Laguna Mar Chiquita as a major drought hit Argentina, and flooding and hailstorms hit southeastern Australia and Queensland in March 2010. The lack of winter precipitation in parts of China, however, contributed to a severe drought in the southwest. Bolivia, Venezuela, Mali, Mauritania, Morocco and Spain have also seen periods of drought in 2009 and 2010. On between May 12 and 26, both Mauritania, the Sénégal River Area and neighbouring parts of both Senegal and Mali faced both a drought and famine in 2010.

A storm (from Proto-Germanic *sturmaz "noise, tumult") is any disturbed state of an astronomical body's atmosphere, especially affecting its surface, and strongly implying severe weather.

Storms are created when a centre of low pressure develops, with a system of high pressure surrounding it. This combination of opposing forces can create winds and result in the formation of storm clouds, such as the cumulonimbus. Small, localized areas of low pressure can form from hot air rising off hot ground, resulting in smaller meteorological disturbances such as dust devils and whirlwinds.

== January ==
=== December 30, 2008—January 1, 2009 ===
An Alberta clipper affected regions around the Great Lakes, Midwestern United States and Northeastern United States. The storm strengthened over the Atlantic, and in turn the Northeastern United States saw about 10–20 cm of snow as compared to the 7-10 cm of snow in the Greater Toronto Area. The Atlantic provinces were in a Blizzard for New Year's Day, with 49 cm recorded in Charlottetown, Prince Edward Island, and 25 cm in Halifax, Nova Scotia. Blizzard warnings and storm surge warnings were posted as winds were sustained more than 60–80 km (37–50 mi), out of the North. Newfoundland and Labrador saw about 15–25 cm of snow, with blowing snow. Another 15–20 cm fell through the province, and 5-15 cm of heavy snowfall occurred in and around Vancouver.

Amounts of 5–15 cm of heavy wet snow fell in Metro Vancouver and the surrounding Fraser Valley.

=== January 2–4 ===
January 2 saw a blizzard hit the Swiss–Liechtenstein border, killing an Italian tourist, when his car skidded into a tree due to black ice on the nearby road.

Yet another winter storm developed and brought about 10–25 cm across Alberta, Saskatchewan and through the Northern Great Plains. 10–20 cm also fell through Northern Ontario, with freezing rain, ice pellets (sleet) and rain to the south. Northeastern United States can expect ice and snow, with rain down south. Traveling will not be easy.

On the west coast, Vancouver and the surrounding Fraser Valley got 5–20 cm of wet snow, with heavier accumulation towards in the interior of British Columbia, about 10–20 cm of dryer, more powdery snow.

=== January 5–7 ===
A major winter storm is developing near the Gulf. It is slowly moving north, and it will be a complex of two lows. Toronto, Ontario, recorded about 13 cm. Niagara region saw snow mixing with ice pellets and Freezing rain. Eastern Ontario and Southern Quebec saw amounts of 15–30 cm. Similar amounts fell in New England. The Atlantic provinces saw snow to start then mixing, and rain was reported in some areas.

Snow continued in Metro Vancouver with accumulations of 2–15 cm of heavy wet snow.

Metro Vancouver and the Fraser Valley were stuck with continuing snow from the 1st-5th with accumulations for those 5 days anywhere from 15 to 30 cm of heavy wet snow pile up. As the temperatures rose (up to 10 °C), heavy rains came to the area starting on the 6th. Rain amounts on the 6th and the 7th were anywhere from 30 to even 150 mm on Western Vancouver Island, the north shore of Vancouver, and sections of the Fraser Valley. In the city of Chilliwack in the Fraser Valley a very deep snow cover, mostly sub-freezing temperatures since December 13, 2008, warm temperatures and heavy rain created flooding concerns for residents living near or on the edge of the Fraser River.

=== January 8 ===
Four died on January 8 during a heavy blizzard in the Indian state of Jammu and Kashmir and the North West Frontier.

=== January 9–11 ===
A storm brought 5–15 cm across the Canadian Prairies and through the Great Plains. Midwest U.S. and Southwestern Ontario could see amounts of 5–25 cm. Many areas are reporting heavy amounts of snowfall.

On the west coast, up to 120 mm could fall in some areas, as a low pressure area comes in. These latest storms have caused flooding in many areas. Due to excessive snow melt courtesy from the large amounts produced by the December Snowstorms with the Pineapple Express storm along with heavy rain fall lead to epic flooding. More than 18 rivers went beyond Major Flood stage and a couple went over Record Stage. These floods led the closure of I-5 in Centralia when the Chehalis and Skookumchuck Rivers overflowed. This was the second time in two consecutive years when that Section of I-5 was closed due to flooding.

=== January 17–19 ===
A major winter storm swept across the Great Lakes region and the U.S. Northeast. Areas of Toronto recorded between 15 and 25 cm, with 10 cm in Windsor, Ontario, & higher amounts towards the Lakes. Some areas reported more than 20 cm of accumulation. This same storm affected Northeastern United States with 10–30 cm, and the Atlantic provinces of Canada. Some areas have reported freezing rain and ice pellets, and even rain mixing in. U.S. Southeast saw mostly rain.

=== January 25–30 ===
On January 21, heavy rain cause worst floods in 40 years in Brunei Darussalam. Heavy rains started late on Tuesday in the oil-rich capital of Bandar Seri Begawan, causing flash floods and landslides, interrupting power supply and shutting some telephone lines. About 145.8 millimetres of rainfall was recorded during the 24-hour period from 8 am Tuesday to 8 am Wednesday, according to the weather department, which expects more rain in the coming days but not as heavy as on Tuesday. Two casualties were reported.

In late January 2009, severe winter storm developed over the Midwest, after having already brought more than an inch of ice to many areas in the United States. The system moved eastward across the Midwest into the Northeast. Many places expected a major ice storm, and areas to the north expected significant snowfall accumulations. Over 2 million people were without power throughout the Midwest and Northeastern United States. About 500,000 people in Kentucky were left without electricity. Ice reached8 cm thick in some areas. The storm caused 23 deaths, with 6 deaths in Texas. Regions of Southern Ontario received between 5–20 cm, with 20–30 cm in Eastern Ontario and Southern Quebec. Similar amounts fell in the Atlantic Provinces, with some rain/snow mixing in at times, as some areas got above the 0 C (32 F) mark.

On January 27, up to 10 cm of heavy wet snow fell in Eastern Metro Vancouver, the surrounding Fraser Valley in British Columbia, and Kitsap Country in Washington. At this point, the winter of 2008-2009 was one of the snowiest in years for Southwestern British Columbia and the pacific northwest as winter storm after winter storm pounded the region from mid-December through to early January. Some locations received up to 125 cm of snow during that period and snowcover for Vancouver exceeded 60 cm at one point in late December pointing to flood concerns on the then ice-jammed Fraser river.

== February ==
=== February 1–2 ===
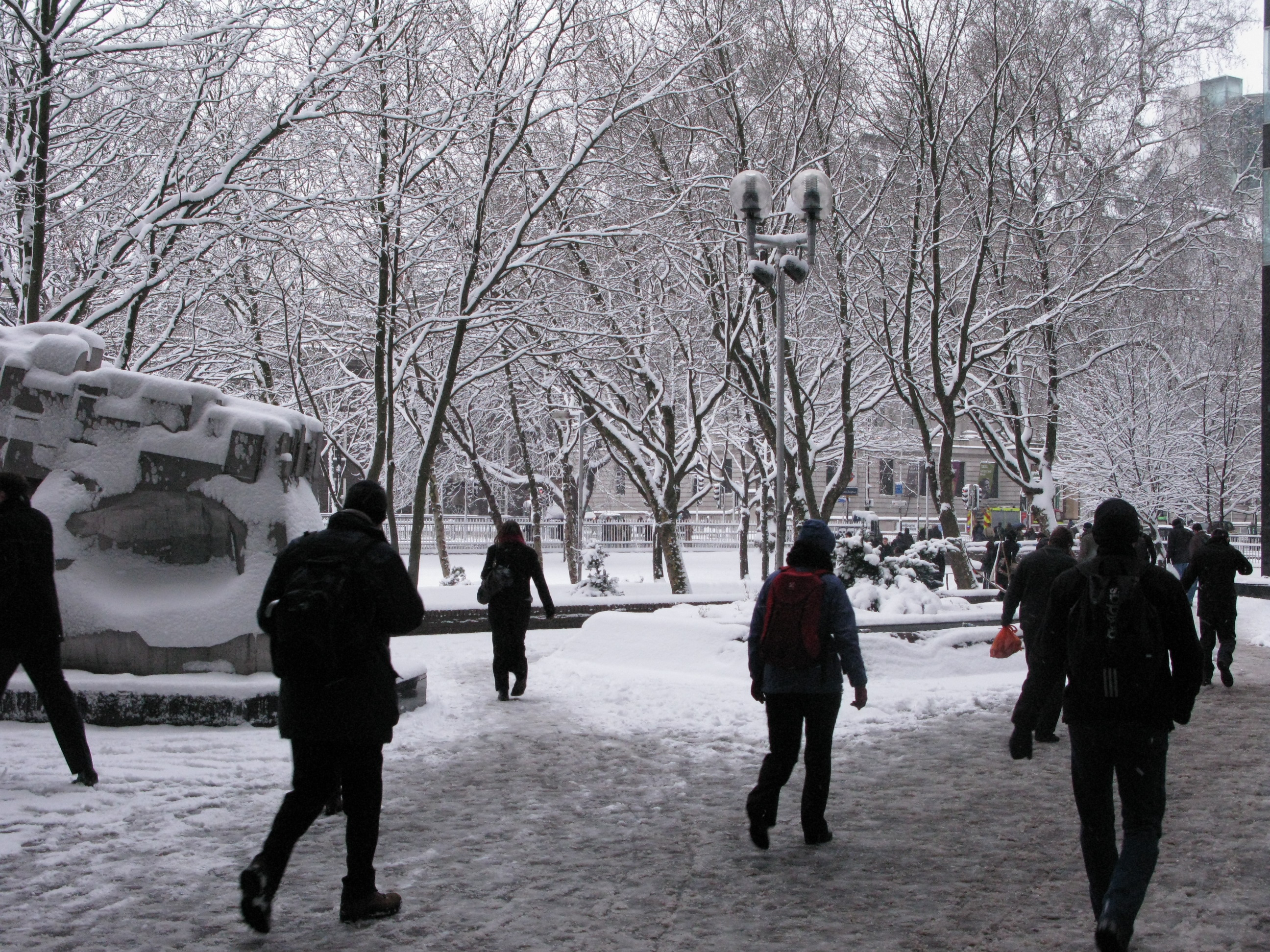
Commuters leaving Euston Station, 2 February 2009

A warm, moist Mediterranean cyclone began to move (unusually?) northwards over France, against a cold continental high pressure ridge, causing the cyclone to discharge its moisture as snow over large areas of western Europe. The system was vigorous enough to produce a winter-time tornado in Málaga.

On February 1 and 2, heavy snow fell overnight across large parts of the United Kingdom, causing widespread disruption to transport and education. London received its heaviest snowfalls in 18 years. Many roads, including the M25 London Orbital motorway, were blocked in the morning rush hour, whilst train services are disrupted and many airport runways closed. Transport for London suspended all London Buses and the London Underground was severely disrupted. Hundreds of schools were forced to close. Temperatures fell below seasonal averages with Chesham, Buckinghamshire recording -10 degrees Celsius at night.

Airports were affected included London's Heathrow and Gatwick airports. Charles de Gaulle Airport and Orly Airport were affected.

Spain, Germany, Portugal and Ireland were also affected. In Ireland, snowstorms disrupted road and rail transport, including the M50 and M1. Dublin Airport and Cork Airport were severely disrupted, as were ferry services in the Irish Sea throughout February 2.

Ireland was affected in a similar way to the UK. In the Republic, the South and East were the worst affected. Due to black ice, driving was very treacherous, with ice and snow blocking many major routes such as the M1 and M50. Dublin Airport and Cork Airport were seriously affected, with many flights to Britain and Europe delayed and cancelled. The major rail routes across Ireland were closed down, as a result of bad ice and snow. Temperatures across Ireland fell below average everywhere, with temperatures of -8 and -9 degrees Celsius recorded in places.

The snow was a result of wind blowing across from West Siberia, and reacted with the low pressure system approaching across from the Atlantic. This created unusually large amounts of snow, which fell across England, Wales and Eastern Ireland. This weather type is rare in Ireland, and is normally confined to small amounts; however, the total amount of snowfall in this storm was the highest since 1981.

A winter storm developing over the Gulf states and through the Gulf of Mexico, is bringing widespread Heavy Rain to the South Eastern States of the US. Up to 100 mm is possible in some areas. Coastal areas of North Eastern United States can expect snowfall of up to 6 inches (15 cm) in some areas, local amounts may be higher. Atlantic Canada will see strong winds and snowfall amounts of 15–30 cm (6–12 in).

A small weather system carrying snow that developed in North France reached South East England and the Midlands which brought 20–30 cm (8–12 in) of snow in some parts of Gloucestershire. Further snow came in from the south and east throughout the week. The worst places affected was the Forest of Dean and The Cotswolds. On 6 February a few small towns in Devon reported around 55 cm (22 in) of lying snow (Okehampton). The Severn Bridge, the main link between England and Wales closed due to falling ice for the first time. Some 321 schools in Buckinghamshire, 300 schools in Gloucestershire and 307 schools in Wales also closed on the 6th.

=== February 6–12 ===
About 3,000 people were killed as a storm complex paced over Haiti on the 6th

A winter storm from the Atlantic reached southern Britain and the Midlands on 9–10 causing heavy rain and flooding. Across the midlands and further north, it was cold enough for it to fall as snow. Coupled with the strong winds, it made blizzard conditions. The Met office issued an extreme winter storm warning for many counties in Great Britain. Meanwhile, a temperature of −18 °C (0 °F) was recorded in the Scottish Highlands — the coldest UK temperature since 2003. Smaller outbreaks of snow occurred across parts of the north and east of England on 12–13 February.

A major storm developing over Texas is affecting many communities in North America. Areas like Oklahoma City were hit hard with heavy rain, hail and a tornado in western Oklahoma City. There have been numerous spottings of funnel clouds. Heavy rain continues through Texas and Kansas, which will extend into Missouri, Arkansas and Louisiana. Areas of Michigan, Illinois and SW Ontario could see pop-up thunderstorms, but likely not as severe. Northern Ontario will see mostly an ice-rain event. While areas to the South could see 25–50 mm (0.98–1.97 in).

=== February 16–20 ===
A major storm affected Newfoundland with strong winds gusting to 100 km/h in some areas. Bitterly cold conditions, strong winds and heavy snowfall caused a blizzard through parts of Newfoundland. Some areas of Newfoundland received between 20 and 40 cm. Local areas and local drifts were locally higher.

A winter storm that developed over Colorado brought messy weather across the Great plains, Midwest U.S., the Great Lakes and Northeast United States. Some areas had a messy mix of snow, ice and rain. Toronto had seen about 10 cm. South Western Ontario saw between 1–10 cm. Northern Areas of Ontario and Quebec received between 10 and 25 cm. Eastern Ontario received between 10 and 20 cm. The northeast saw local amounts of over 15 cm. From Midwestern sections of the U.S. to the Southern Lakes messy mix was reported with rain at times. Southern United States saw heavy amounts of rainfall, Thunderstorms and Tornado warnings were issued in some areas.

The Atlantic provinces are seeing heavy snowfall and some mixed precipitation. Areas could exceed 10 cm. Newfoundland could get more heavy snowfall.

=== February 21–23 ===
An Alberta clipper, which picked up moisture from the Gulf, dumped about 5–20 cm across the Midwest, and the Great Lakes area. Areas like Windsor saw close to 15 cm, Toronto saw about 5–12 cm. Eastern Ontario and Southern Quebec could see slightly higher amounts as a coastal low develops, and gives heavier snow. Northeastern United States are seeing snow, mix precipitation and rainfall. The heavier snowfall is towards New England and Maine.

Atlantic Canada is seeing blizzard like conditions. 15–40 cm is possible is some areas. Winter storm warnings and snowfall warnings are in place.

== March ==
=== March 1–4 ===
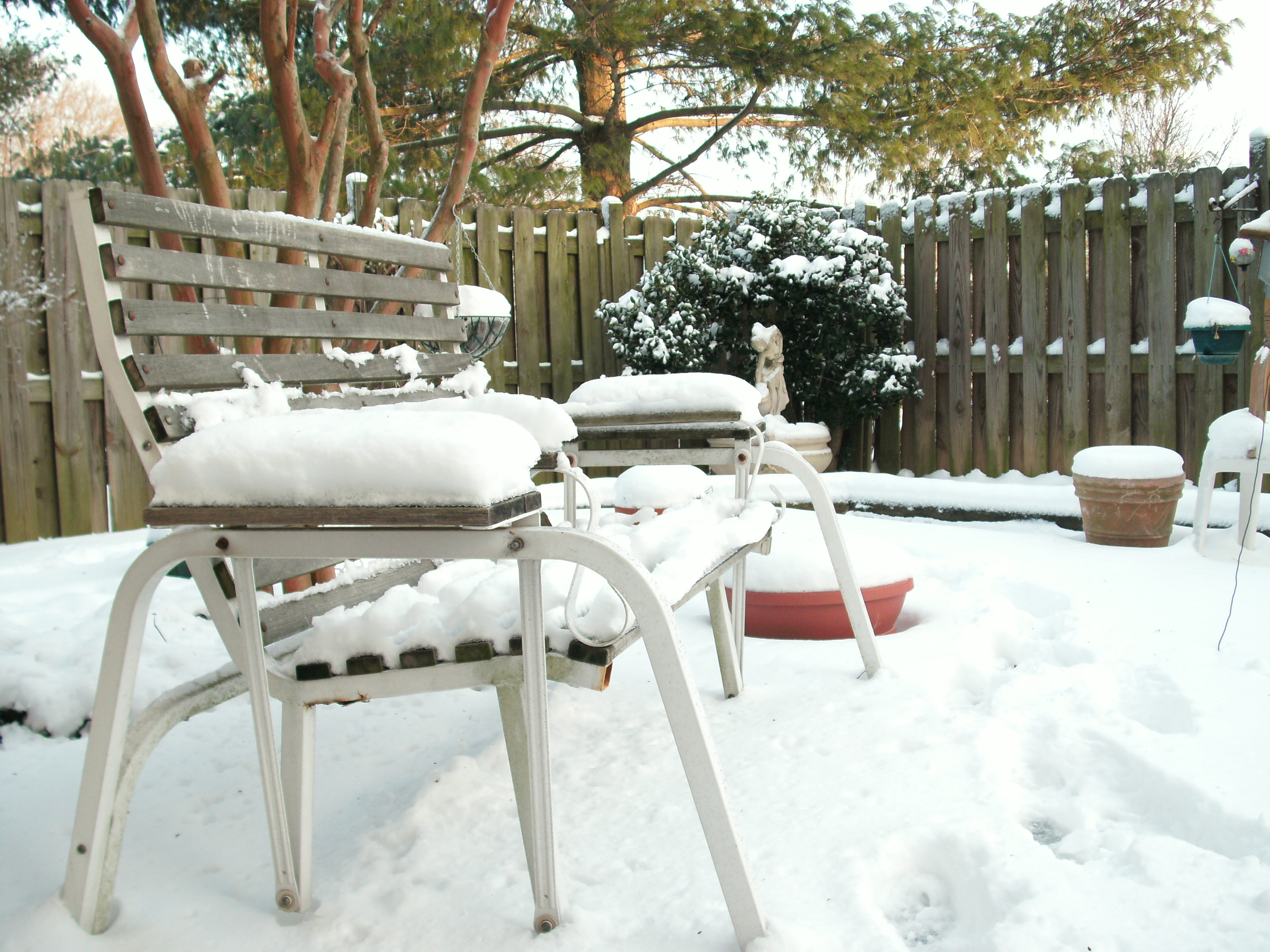
Snow on the ground in Mount Vernon, Virginia, in the aftermath of the storm

A major winter storm which brought up to 16" of snow to parts of West Tennessee and Arkansas and up to 7" of snow to parts of Georgia (including the Atlanta area), Alabama (including Birmingham) and Mississippi gathered strength and moved northeastward, in the process crossing the Washington, D.C. metropolitan area before impacting the greater New York and greater Philadelphia areas. The storm was a large, widespread storm, with snow totals exceeding 8 inches (200 mm) across most of the tri-state area. as well as 3–7 inches north of Rockland County, as well as scattered amounts of 17–20 inches in New Jersey and Pennsylvania.

On March 1 to 2 a heavy dust storm hits N.E. China and parts of Mongolia. It then parses over the Bohai Sea and the Yellow Sea, finally dispersing over North Korea and South Korea in the 4th

=== March 7 ===
On the 7th, heavy rain induced floods killed 52 in Bolivia, 19 in Peru, and 16 in Ecuador, said news reports.

=== March 9 ===
A quick late winter storm caused about 5–15 cm of snow in Metro Vancouver, British Columbia, Canada with cold wind chills as low as -10 °C and with sustained winds at about 20 km/h.

=== March 13 ===
Snow storm strands 2 busses, 53 cars and 83 people on the Ust-Kamenogorsk-Georgiyevka highway in Kazakhstan on March 13.

=== March 22 ===
Heavy snow and ice hits the Sea of Okhotsk, Sakhalin Island and Primorsky Krai in Russia far east on March 22.

=== March 26–28 ===
A major blizzard hit Denver and other counties around the area on Thursday, March 26. Parts of the Front Range saw 18 inches (460 mm) of snow and schools around Denver were closed early. Denver International Airport canceled more than 400 planes departing and arriving. On Friday, March 27, the storm impacted Kansas, northwestern Oklahoma, and the Texas Panhandle, with 12 to 24 inches (610 mm) of snow and blizzard conditions. Some areas around Pratt County, Kansas and Kiowa County, Kansas received 28" of Snowfall. Snow Drifts reached 10 feet (3.0 m) high in Dalhart, Texas. On Friday night and into Saturday, March 28, the storm system impacted the Kansas City area and northern parts of Missouri, before moving into the Quad Cities area, Northern Illinois and Southern Wisconsin on Saturday night. Numerous areas here saw between 4 and 8" of snow. Waukegan, Illinois, saw around half a foot from this late-season winter blast.

== April ==
=== April 12–13 ===
A late major winter storm coming from New England was expected to hit the Maritime Provinces on Easter. 15–30 cm of snow was expected in most areas, and Halifax and southern areas were expected to see heavy rain.

== June ==
=== June 2 ===
Another 15 people and 10,000 head of cattle had died by this date in Mongolia. Snow also fell on Russia's Sakhalin island.

=== June 6 ===
Heavy rain and storm with twister in Czech Republic

== July ==
=== July 1 ===
Heavy rain falls in parts of Ukraine.

=== July 11 ===
July 11 saw heavy storms flood the Chinese city of Shuzou, in Jiangsu Province.

=== July 17 ===
On July 17, flooding caused by heavy rain and hailstorms hit Nanaimo village, and its environs as bad weather sweeps over most of Mongolia, killing 24 people as it did so.

=== July 24 ===
On July 24, the Dakar Rally stage in Mauritania due to heavy sandstorms and high winds.

== August ==
=== August 5–6 ===
August 5 and 6 saw the Maritime affairs department in Hainan province issued an emergency tropical storm warning to 20,000 fishing vessels in the South China Sea as Typhoons Morakot and Goni, approached China's Guangdong Province. Heavy storms hit the cities of Guangzhou, Zhuhai and Haikou. More than 953,000 residents and more than 35,000 boats were evacuated back to shore in the eastern and southeastern provinces of the People's Republic of China as Typhoons Morakot approached A fishing boat capsized with nine fishermen missing. 3 people died in the China and 462 died in Taiwan.

=== August 4–10 ===
Blizzards in southern Brazil, reached 1,000,000 people, closing roads. Maximum accumulation of snow 50 cm (20 in) and a minimum temperature of −7 °C (19 °F).

=== August 21–28 ===
A stream of moisture that emerged from the Gulf of California brought rain to Southern California. A flash flood warning was issued for Central and Eastern San Diego County as a result of the rain. Later on, the system moved north and started to move towards the east coast on Sunday, August 23. The remaining thunderstorms lingered around in Central and Eastern San Diego County until Friday, August 28 before finally moving towards the east coast.

== September ==
=== September 2–8 ===
A heavy and rainy cyclone hit the Bering Sea, Choris Peninsula and parts of the Aleutian Islands on September 2. A heavy storm hit parts of the Beaufort Sea and parts of the Chukchi Sea on September 4.

Heavy rain and floods on the 4th also lead to both cars were under water and bales of wheat are floating down the swollen river past Mr A.J. Duncan's farms at Muirden Farm, Turriff, Aberdeenshire. Both Oxbridge and Publican spring barley planting was at risk if the flood waters did not clear quickly.

On the 8th unusually heavy rain hit Argentina, and storms hit Argentina, Brazil and Uruguay, killing 14 or 15 people (reports varied). Tornados his Argentina to. A town official in Santa Rosa, Paulo Alvez appealed for help for both the town of Santa Rosa and El Progreso.

Arkansas witnessed heavy flooding on the 7th and 8th.

== October ==
=== October 1–5 ===
A heavy and snowy cyclone hit the Kedrovaya River in Primorsky Krai and parts of the Aleutian Islands on October 1.

A heavy and rainy cyclone hit the Bering Sea and parts of the Chukchi Sea on October 3. 21 people were confirmed dead following rainstorms and landslides in Sicily. A fishing boat was damaged at sea off the coast of Sicily. Austria saw heavy flooding, with lesser levels in the Czech Republic, Poland, Slovenia, Slovakia, Romania, Moldova and southern parts of Ukraine. Two Ukrainians and a Moldovan died in the storm.

5 days of unusually heavy rain left 205 dead, 125 injured and 750,000 homeless in southern India by October the 5th. Indian and Sri Lankan medical teams managed to save many lives across Tamil Nadu and Kerala states.

=== October 7–20 ===
Late on October 11, the disorganized remnants of Typhoon Melor were absorbed by another low-pressure system just north of it, similar to how Typhoon Kujira's remnants were absorbed by another extratropical system. The extratropical cyclone rapidly intensified as it neared the Pacific Northwest. Several wind and flood watches/warnings were issued on October 17 in advance for the expected arrival of the winter storm. A high wave advisory was issued for the entire western seaboard. Just before midnight of October 18, the powerful winter storm struck California with gale-force winds and torrential rainfall. In Northern California, the rainfall was seemingly endless. The San Francisco Bay area suffered the most damage, from 40-foot (12 m) high waves and reported gusts of 85 mph (137 km/h). A rare storm warning was posted for San Francisco Bay and subsequently, wind gusts were clocked at 75 mph (121 km/h) on Angel Island. While the main system remained offshore, the storm's moisture split into two new systems over the Western United States, which rapidly moved eastward across the US, bringing strong winds and heavy rain. On December 20, after looping back north into the Gulf of Alaska, the storm complex was absorbed by another stronger extratropical cyclone approaching from the west. The damage that the storm complex caused is currently estimated at $1.18 million (2009 USD).

Heavy snow fell in parts of Pennsylvania between October 15 and 16. State College, Pennsylvania saw ten inches (250 mm) of wet snow, causing a very memorable Penn State homecoming game, and breaking numerous records, such as earliest recorded snowfall, most severe October snowstorm, and most snow in the month of October. Moderate snow fell between October 15 and 18 in the Northeastern United States, as far as the suburbs of New York City, with light snow being reported in the city itself. Boston suburbs saw moderate, wet snow fall on the morning of October 16, in spots accumulating up to 0.5 inches (13 mm). The area was then hit on October 18, when in the afternoon, heavy rain turned to heavy snow and almost white-out conditions. The ground was too warm for any significant accumulation, but up to 2 inches (51 mm) were reported at spots between Boston and Lowell. All of the snow melted by October 20.

=== October 12–13 ===
On 12 October 2009, Just over 200 herdsmen and 1,000 heads of livestock had been stranded by heavy snowfalls in Ali prefecture. The week-long snowfall had accumulated to about 30 centimetres in Pulan County in Ali, with some areas reaching as much as 1 meter depth, according to Xing Xiuyin, head of an armed police detachment stationed in the Tibetan region. 30 soldiers and two snow-clearing machines were sent on the way to Ali, according to Xing Xiuyin. Thousands of people were trapped as heavy snow fell in Tibet's Lhunze County, but rescue services managed to minimize the casualties and damage to homes. The rescue services also managed to provide shelter and emergency fodder for 200 head of cattle. By October 13, snow was reported by Chinese authorities to be falling in both Qinghai and Heilongjiang Provinces.

=== October 15–16 ===
On 15 October 2009, Germany, Austria and Poland were hit by heavy snowstorms. One person died after falling in a Tyrolian lake by accident.

27,000 lightning strikes and heavy rainstorms hit parts of Spain in just over 12 hours on 16 October.

On October 16 the cold weather in Poland kills 4 people and the Czech power company CEZ Group declared a state of emergency in 8 regions due to the widespread reports of fallen power lines. The town of Jablonec nad Nisou was mostly blacked out by a power outage. Heavy snow was reported in Poland, the Czech Republic, Slovakia, Liechtenstein and the Austrian province of Styria.

=== October 29–30 ===
Between October 29 and 30 a very powerful winter storm battered the west coast of the US, although it did not affect Southern California. It was very windy in the places that it hit, but the storm only stayed there for two days. The storm left and traveled towards the east coast after that day. The only affect the storm had on Southern California was bringing a cloudy day with very cold temperatures.

=== October 31 ===
Heavy snowfall hit Russia's Primorsky Territory on October 31, as the cold windstorm moved from the Sea of Okhotsk to the coast of the Kamchatka Peninsula, bringing heavy snow and rain to the region that meteorologists expected to last another 24 hours. They also warned that temperatures would fall by up to 15 degrees and that weather conditions could make traveling difficult as snowfall in the Vladivostok area had already significantly impeded travel by larger vehicles. The city administration's official Yevgeny Kolpinets told the Russian news agency Itar-Tass that the inclement weather had stopped bus traffic in the city, but luckily no energy supply service problems had been reported. Weather forecasters expected more cyclone-generated snow fall over the next few days.

== November ==
=== November 3–18 ===
On November 3, the Harbin Snow Festival in Harbin, Heilongjiang, China, experienced unusually heavy snow. The festival was first started in 1985 and had never before seen such heavy snowfall. Harbin is China's tenth-largest city with a population of about 4,500,000, so planned electricity rationing would hit this usually busy city hard, as would the planned rationing in Beijing. The worst snowstorms in Northeastern China since 1949 claimed 40 lives, destroyed thousands of buildings and destroyed almost 500,000 acres (202,343 ha) of winter crops, according to the Civil Affairs Ministry. The snowfall was the heaviest in the provinces of Hebei, Shanxi, Shaanxi, Shandong and Henan since the founding of the People's Republic of China in 1949.

On November 4, Tropical Storm Ida hits Nicaragua and later the Gulf of Mexico. The Lower Mississippi River Forecast Center puts out a flood alert on the Mississippi River By November the 7th, a storm waning was also out in Pinar del Río, in western Cuba, as it headed out of Central America and in to southern Mexico. Winds of 70 mph (110 km/h) were forecast for Yucatán Peninsula and Yucatán Channel. Heavy rain was reported in parts of Haiti. A rainfall of 3 to 10 inches (250 mm) is predicted by local authorities and the Lower Mississippi River Forecast Center for both the Yucatán Peninsula and western Cuba. By the 10th, it had virtually died out and was only a bad storm in New Orleans and Pensacola. 35-45 M.P.H. winds and heavy rain battered the rest of Florida's Gulf Coast and Alabama's Dauphin Island. The remnants of the storm then caused some more snow to fall in the southern parts the Great Plains on region the 11th and 12th.

On November 10, heavy rain and intermittent snow hit the Cheviot Hills, Pennines, Dee Valley in Wales and The Wash. Light snow fell in the Grampian Mountains and Aberdeenshire. Passing sleet was also recorded in Lincolnshire on the 10th. A flood watch was put on the River Tay and the River Dee. Minor surface flooding had already occurred in parts of Lincolnshire and Cumbria after the previous two days flooding.

11 November 2009, saw snow and/or rain storms menacing Hungary, Iceland, India's part of the Himalayas (rain and snow), parts of Indonesia (rain only), north western Iran, northern Iraq, Mount Fuji in Japan and in Armenia. Yet more snow storms hit the People's Republic of China, disrupting traffic across the northeastern provinces, Beijing and Tibet on November the 10th and 11th. Most of Bulgaria's poor drainage systems and second-rate storm drains failed during the day's heavy rain and windstorms. Snow was also present in most of the mountain regions.

Heavy snowfall in China caused school building collapses and the deaths of 38 people on the 18th.

=== November 10–13 ===
Floods on the 10th and 11th killed 8 in Brazil's Rio Grande do Sul, according to the state's Civil Defence Department. 4 others were killed in Argentina and Uruguay. 22,000 people were evacuated in each nation as heavy rain made the rivers between Uruguay and Argentina to overflow its banks.

=== November 11 – December 30 ===
After a rather snowy November 11, Iceland's weather became rather unusual. From November 12 to December 30, Iceland's abnormally warm and dry November weather gave way and December became very snowy with the town of Akureyri receiving 35 cm of snow over the night of December 1–2. Snow fell and blizzards occurred intermittently throughout a windy December.

On December 12, heavy snow hit Dimmuborgir, Iceland.

=== November 14 ===
A blizzard and about half a foot of snow fell on the 1,040 m high Peak Chekhov, near Yuzhno, Sakhalin Island, on November 14, 2009.

=== November 18–25 ===
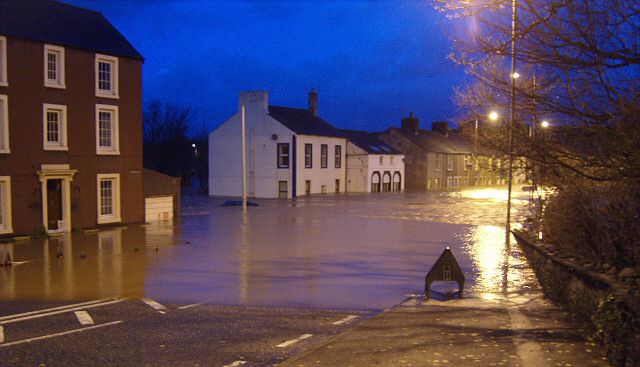
The approach to Calva Bridge, Workington, 20 November 2009.

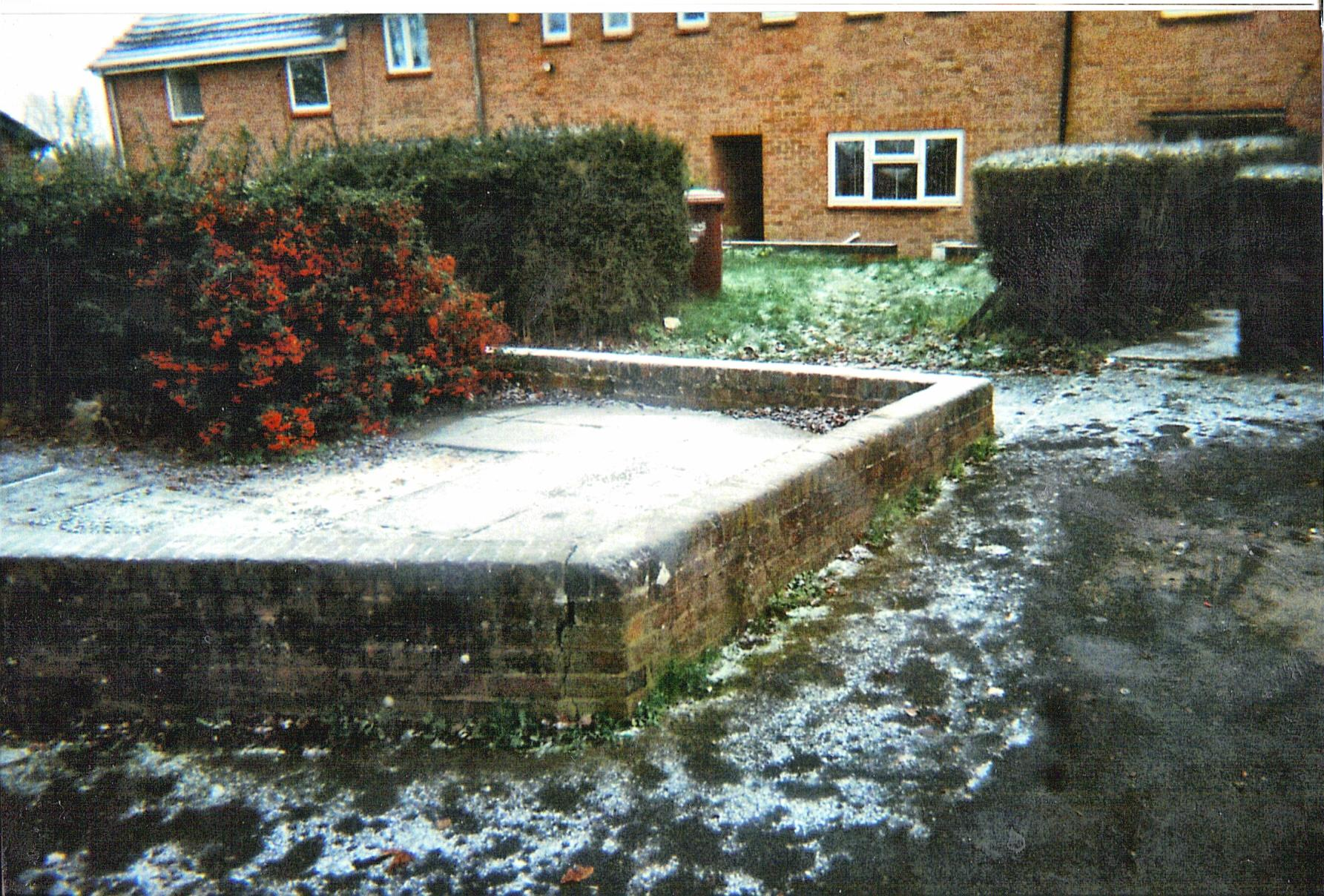
A snowy Banbury street on Nov' 20, 2009.

Many properties were flooded in Ambleside on November 18, leaving the main road impassible for most vehicles. Over 200 people in Cockermouth were rescued from their homes by the emergency services.

On the Isle of Man, there were brief power cuts on the 18th, in Ballaragh and Laxey but Manx Electricity restored power to all affected properties by the afternoon.

On the 20th, all services on the West Coast Main Line were still temporarily suspended after a landslip between Carlisle and Penrith. The West Coast Main Line was flooded between Carlisle and Carstairs and was closed as a result. Services were reduced between Edinburgh and Glasgow and also Edinburgh and Dunblane.

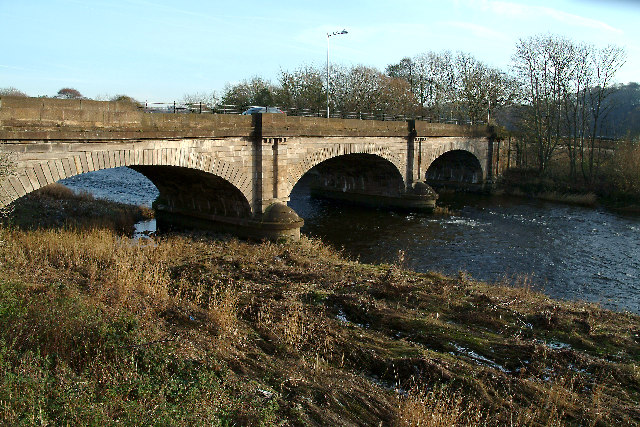
Calva Bridge, Workington in Cumbria, which was condemned as a result of damage received in the flooding.

In Workington, the collapse of Northside Bridge carrying the A597 road and the condemnation of Calva Bridge carrying the A596 resulted in a 40 miles (64 km) journey from Northside to the town centre. Network Rail are constructed a temporary railway station, Workington North, to help Northside residents get into and out of town. The 170 members of the Royal Engineers from 170 (Infrastructure Support Unit) installed a temporary footbridge upstream of Calva Bridge, which opened as scheduled, on 5 December 2009.

As a result of the loss of all road and footbridges in Workington on November 19, it was announced that a new railway station, Workington North, would be built on wasteland leased for two years from Allerdale Council. The station was scheduled to open by 28 November with services provided by Northern Rail. Workington North opened on 30 November 2009.

The government pledged £1,000,000 to the reconstruction of the shattered town, but deemed any new (permanent) road or a (temporary) rail bridge unnecessary and only allowed the army engineers to build a temporary foot bridge at state expense to begin with. Northern Rail, Network Rail and a local contractor all helped in the building of Workington North station. The Department for Transport announced that it would fund the service until 31 December 2009, at a cost of £216,000. All trains between Workington, Workington North, Flimby and Maryport would be free of charge until 31 December 2009.

Heavy sandstorms hit Mauritania on Nov 22.

County Fermanagh was hit by heavy rain on November the 23rd. Many roads were flooded or hit by landslides. The B36 Dernawilt Road between Enniskillen and Killyfole was one of many that were affected by the storm. Both Lough Erne and the Colebrooke River were put on flood alert.

A mini-tornado tore through Maypole Lane in the Derbyshire village of Littleover the next day, November 24. Derbyshire Fire and Rescue Service reported moderate damage in the Village on the 24th. A small waterspout was reported off the coast of Aberdeenshire.

25 November saw fierce winds rattling Dublin Airport and parts of the east coast of Ireland, leading to the diversion of ten aircraft—seven aircraft to Shannon Airport and three aircraft to Manchester Airport. Some of the affected aircraft were transatlantic flights from destinations such as Chicago and New York.

=== November 21 – December 3 ===
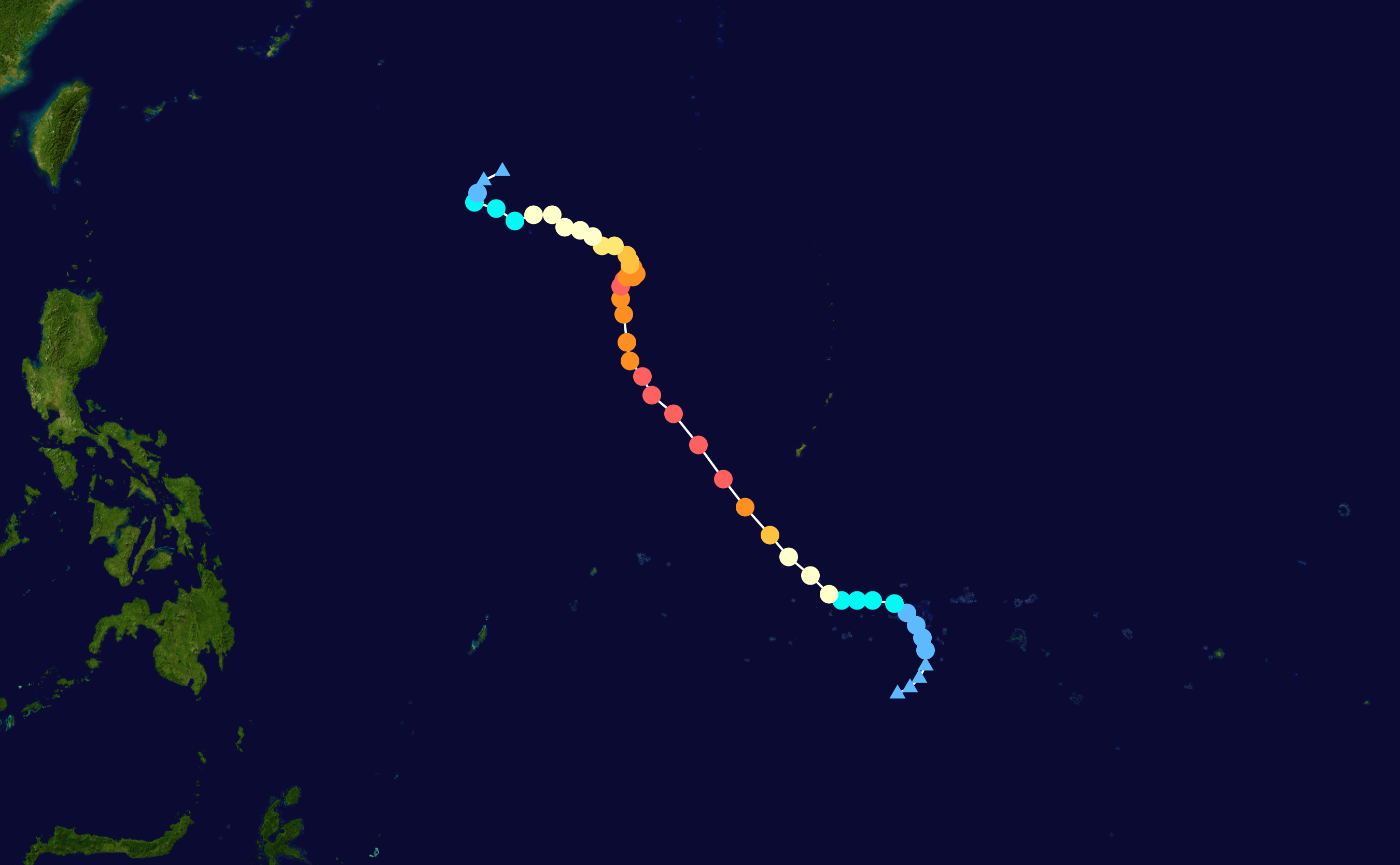
Typhoon Nida's storm path

Early on November 21 the Joint Typhoon Warning Center (JTWC) reported that an area of convection had persisted within a monsoon trough about 880 km (550 mi) to the southeast of Guam. The typhoon later weakened to a category four, before re-strengthening to a category five on November 27, remaining quasi-stationary for more than two days. It weakened to a tropical depression on December 2, after sending bursts of moisture into the jet stream. The storm dissipated on December 3.

=== November 25–30 ===
On November 25, a cold extratropical cyclone tracked into Russia's Primorsky Territory from the Yellow Sea. Weather forecasters correctly predicted snow, gale-force wind and temperatures between 0 and −2 °C, with one night's temperature drop reaching −25°С. Over the next week the daytime temperature was predicted to be between 2°С to -10°С, with a nighttime temperature between −24 and −25 °C. The wind speed was expected to be between 0 and 11 m/s (40 km/h). Both ice and avalanche warnings were issued for a week (to December 2) as heavy snow was predicted for both Primorsky Krai and Amur Krai, but significantly less than expected actually occurred over the week and the storm finally cleared up on 30 November, rather than on December 2.

A powerful storm (probably the earlier one from Primorsky Krai) stalled in the Gulf of Alaska on November 25. On the 26th, its wind field produced high tides on the western seaboard. The storm weakened significantly on the 27th and moved towards Southern California, bringing heavy rainfall starting early in the morning and causing strong winds. The storm left Southern California and moved on to batter the east coast during the afternoon of Sunday, November 29, 2009. A heavy and snowy cyclone hit the Aleutian Islands on November 30.

By November 27 heavy rain was moving over the Irish Sea is set to give some heavy rain then turning to snow over parts of the Peak District, with altitudes above 1,000 feet (300 m), dropping over 2 inches (5.1 cm) of snow in some places. This is the usual snowfall for parts of Scotland, including the West Highlands and the East Highlands.

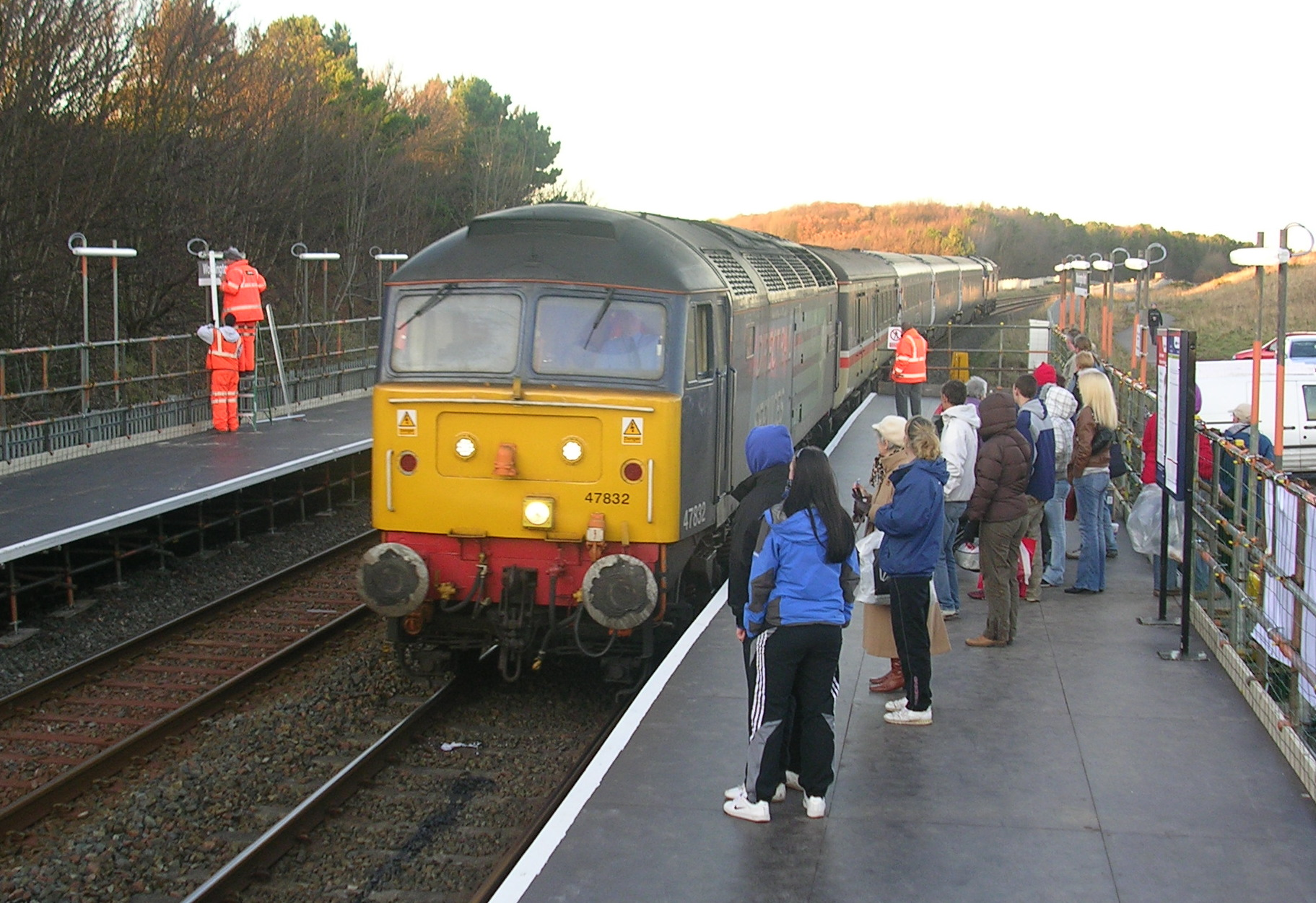
Network Rail's new Workington Workington North Temporary Station opened 30 November 2009.

In the U.K., Cumbria's Workington North Temporary Station was officially opened on 30 November 2009.

On the 30th more than 100 people died as heavy rain flood Jeddah, Saudi Arabia. The poorly designed and built local infrastructure and mismanagement of city works construction have been blamed, as well as the effects of Global Warming.

== December ==
=== December 1–2 ===
On December 1 and 2 heavy rain fell in the British Isles, and into the night, the rain band hit the cold air and turned to snow giving about 1 foot (30 cm) on some hilltops and mountains across Scotland.

On 2 December, thousands of acres of Irish farmland remained underwater, floodwaters were still rising in some County Galway villages and roads in County Clare and Galway were still impassable. Floods were still in situ across the UK and both bus and train services were disrupted in Essex, Cumbria and Pembrokeshire. The River Severn and River Derwent were put on flood watch by the Environment Agency.

=== December 3, 2009 – January 1, 2010 ===
Toronto, Ontario, Canada was hit by both a cold front and two extreme cold weather warnings between December 3 and January 1. A strong arctic cold front moved through Alberta from the northwest, bringing from 4 to 12 inches (10 to 30 cm) of snowfall. Winds gusted to 50 mph (80 km/h), causing whiteout and blizzard conditions across most of Alberta. The southern half of the province got the worst of the storm. The winds blew the snow into massive drifts and snow banks up to 10 feet (3.0 m) in height. Numerous communities in Calgary were completely snowed in for three days, from December 5 to 7. Numerous cars and trucks were abandoned, with many of them buried up to their roofs in snow.

=== December 4–7 ===
Between December 4–7 a heavy snow storm hit Calgary and disrupted travel in general Canada.

=== December 6–14 ===
The December 2009 North American snowstorms were a meteorological event in North America that started on December 11. The snowstorms brought record amounts of snow to the Midwest and contributed to deaths of 16 people. The storms affected a number of US states, including Arizona, Wisconsin and New York, as well as Canada. Although the initial storm had virtually subsided by December 11, further snow was expected to fall.

A weak disturbance that started overnight on December 6 stalled over the western United States and intensified rapidly. Heavy downpours began early in the morning of December 7 and continued non-stop until the evening, triggering flash-flood watches. The storm dropped as much as 4.5 in (110 mm) of rain in Cuyamaca, San Diego, causing blackouts in some locations. This storm was followed by a small semi-tropical winter storm which started overnight on December 10 and then stalled over Southern California and intensified, causing heavy downpours. In addition to 4 inches (100 mm) of rain, this storm gave pea-sized-hail and gusty winds before weakening and moving away from Southern California on December 13.

Heavy snow hit Wisconsin, New York, Washington, D.C., and parts of Maryland on the 10th and 14th. Heavy rain hit parts of Arizona on the 11th.

In Vancouver, BC a strong winter storm deposited anywhere from 10 to 30 cm of heavy snow from the night of the 12th through to the morning of the 15th after a frigid arctic air that had been over the region for days with as low as -15 °C temperatures met with moist Pacific air.

=== December 8–16 ===
Light snow began to fall in the Grampian Mountains on December 8. On the 8th more heavy snow showers followed on the 18th. Heavy overnight snow caused widespread disruption across England in the South East, East Anglia, the East Midlands and Yorkshire and the Humber. East Winds brought further snowfalls in the northern half of the UK.

Overnight, five Eurostar trains were stuck in the Channel Tunnel, trapping 2,000 people for 16 hours after electrical failures due to cold temperatures. Many schools in England were closed on the 9th. During the December 2009 European snowfall, four Eurostar trains broke down inside the Channel Tunnel, after leaving France, and one in Kent on 18 December. Although the trains had been winterised, the systems had not coped with the conditions. Over 2,000 passengers were stuck inside failed trains inside the tunnel, and over 75,000 had their services disrupted. All Eurostar services were cancelled from Saturday 19 December to Monday 21 December 2009. An independent review, published on 12 February 2010, was critical of the contingency plans in place for assisting passengers stranded by the delays, calling them "insufficient".

The cold weather began in earnest on December 10, with temperatures in Braemar, Aberdeenshire reaching a low of −4.9 °C on the 10th, −7 °C on the 11th, and −8.9 °C on the 12th. This was the beginning of the "Big Freeze". Between December 11 and 16, cold air from the north and east brought subzero temperatures to many northern parts of the UK and the southern county of Oxfordshire, along with dense fog.

=== December 14–21 ===
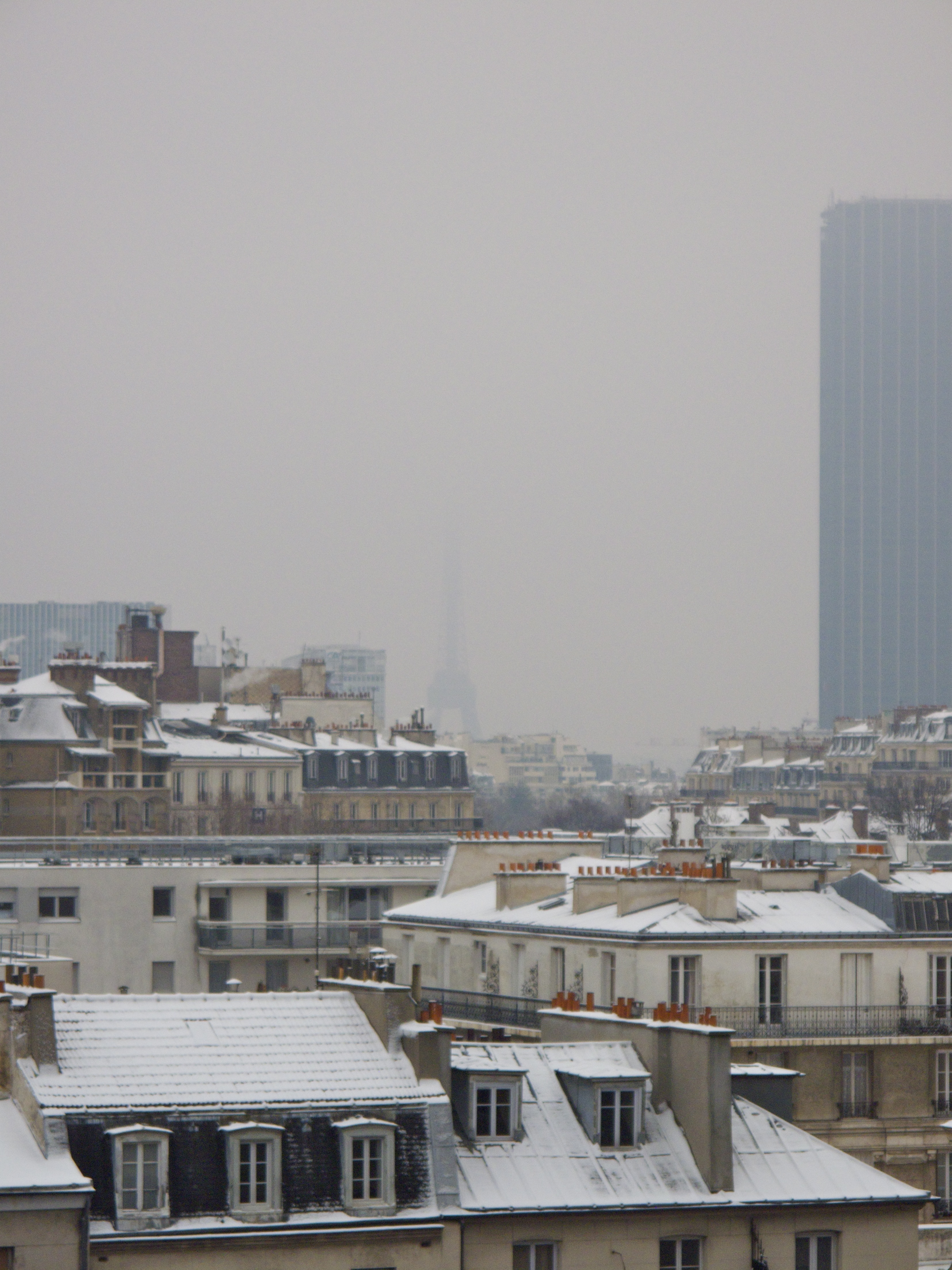
Paris, France, on 17 December

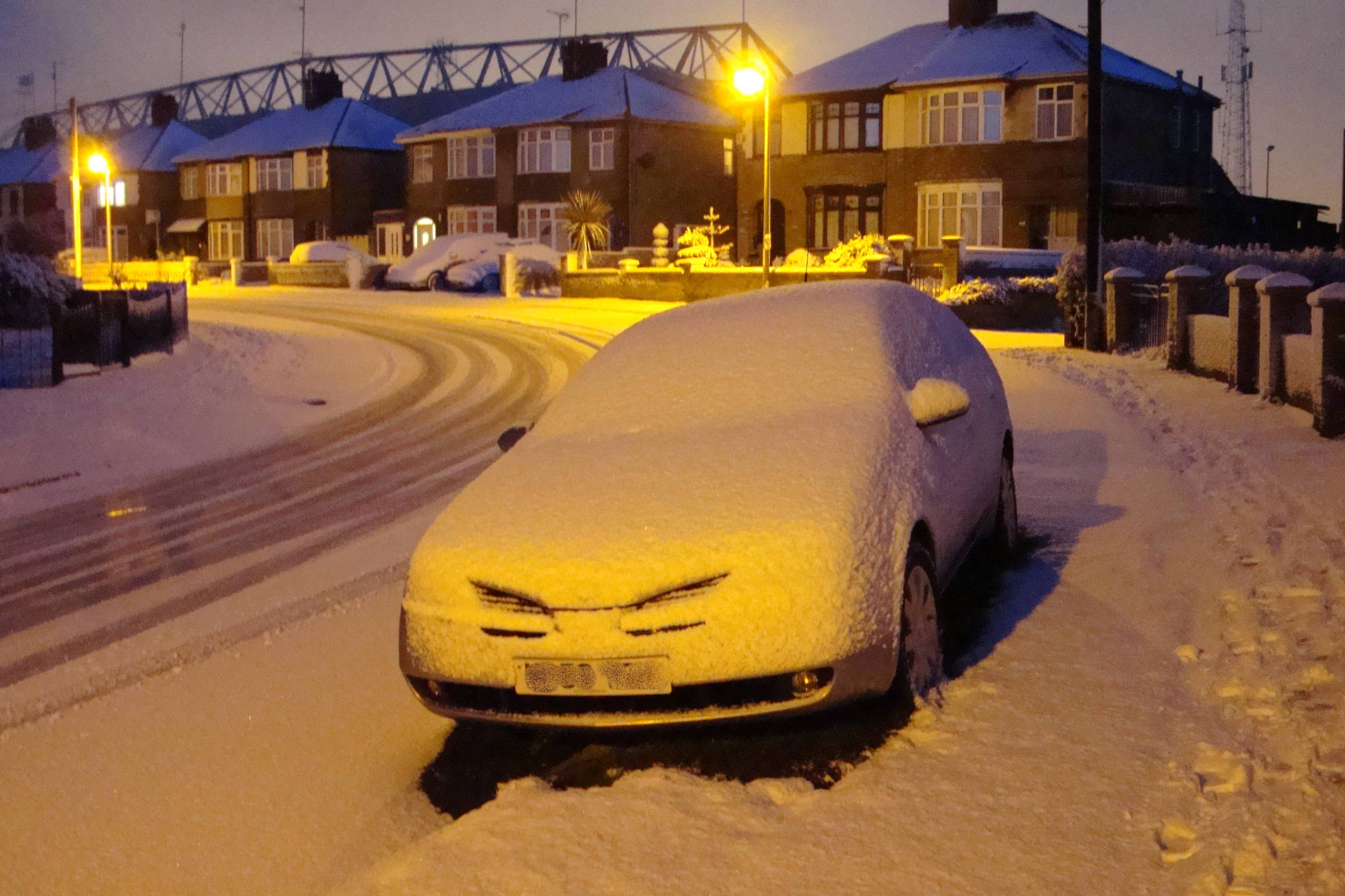
Peterborough, England, on 18 December

A major blizzard killed 11 people in Romania between December 14 and 21.

Wintery showers of rain, sleet, and heavy snow affected East and South-East parts of the United Kingdom. On 18 December, heavy snowfall caused widespread disruption and travel chaos across large parts of Lancashire, South East England, East Anglia, the East Midlands and Yorkshire and the Humber, forcing schools to close early for the upcoming Christmas holiday and cutting power supplies in some areas. The heaviest snowfall in 20 years also caused temperatures to fall as low as −16 °C (3 °F) in the Scottish Highlands.

More heavy snow showers followed on December 18. Heavy overnight snow caused widespread disruption across England in the South East, East Anglia, the East Midlands, Yorkshire, and the Humber. Five Eurostar trains were stuck in the Channel Tunnel after electrical failures due to cold temperatures, trapping 2,000 people for up to 16 hours. Many schools in England were closed on December 18.

Heavy snowfall and sub-zero temperatures killed at least 290 people across Europe. Temperatures fell to as low as −33 °C (−27 °F) in Germany, suspending and cancelling flights and stranding thousands of Christmas passengers. As many as 40% of flights from Paris's two airports, Orly and Charles de Gaulle, were cancelled. Berlin Tegel Airport, Amsterdam's Schiphol Airport, and Frankfurt International Airport were forced to close due to ice on the runway.

Heavy snow fell in both the Russian territories of Krasnodar Krai and in the Russian Far East on December the 18th. The Far Eastern storm had heavy snow flurries occurred across the Sea of Okhotsk, Cape Lopatka, Avacha Bay, Petropavlovsk-Kamchatsky, Volcanoes of Kamchatka, which a UNESCO World Heritage Site in the Kamchatka Peninsula's Central Range Mountains on December the 18th.

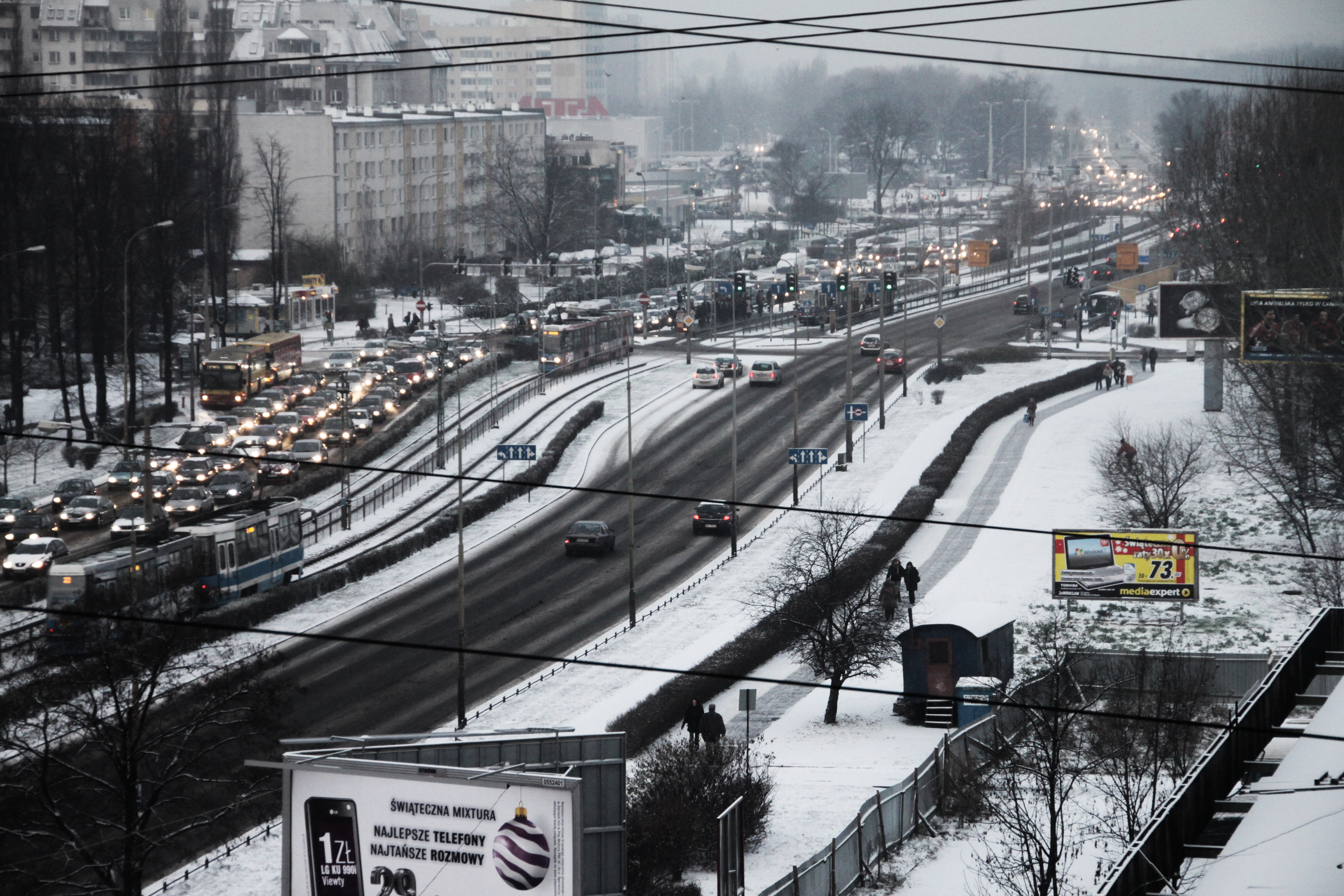
Wrocław, Poland, on 20 December.

On December 20, 3 people froze to death in Steiermark, Austria, while blizzards hit S.W. Norway. December 21 and 22 saw 20 cm of snow fall in Moscow and nearby towns Temperatures of as low as −20 °C killed 47 people in Poland on December 20. In northern Italy, some locations recorded the lowest temperature since 1985, with one low reaching −17 °C (1 °F). Finland, the UK, Belgium, and the Netherlands also recorded record low temperatures.

In the United Kingdom, many major motorways, including the M25, M4, M40 and M1, were brought to a standstill due to snow drifts, cold, and ice, leaving many towns gridlocked. The UK's Highways Agency tried to grit the M11 and M1, only to have a gritter van skid off the M11 and into a deep snow drift. Some people were able to travel from London Victoria Station to Ashford International railway station courtesy of a steam train hauled by Tornado. Widespread transport disruption to roads, railways, buses, and airports affected much of England, Wales, Scotland and Northern Ireland.

In Zagreb, Croatia, around 50 passengers were injured when a train travelling from Sisak to Zagreb failed to stop due to black ice on the rails and hit a buffer at the city's main railway station. One person suffered life-threatening injuries, while some 40 others required medical attention. A homeless man froze to death in southern Kosovo during a localized snowstorm. In Bosnia and Herzegovina, 3 people were found dead from hypothermia in Sarajevo and Teslić.

=== December 16–19 ===
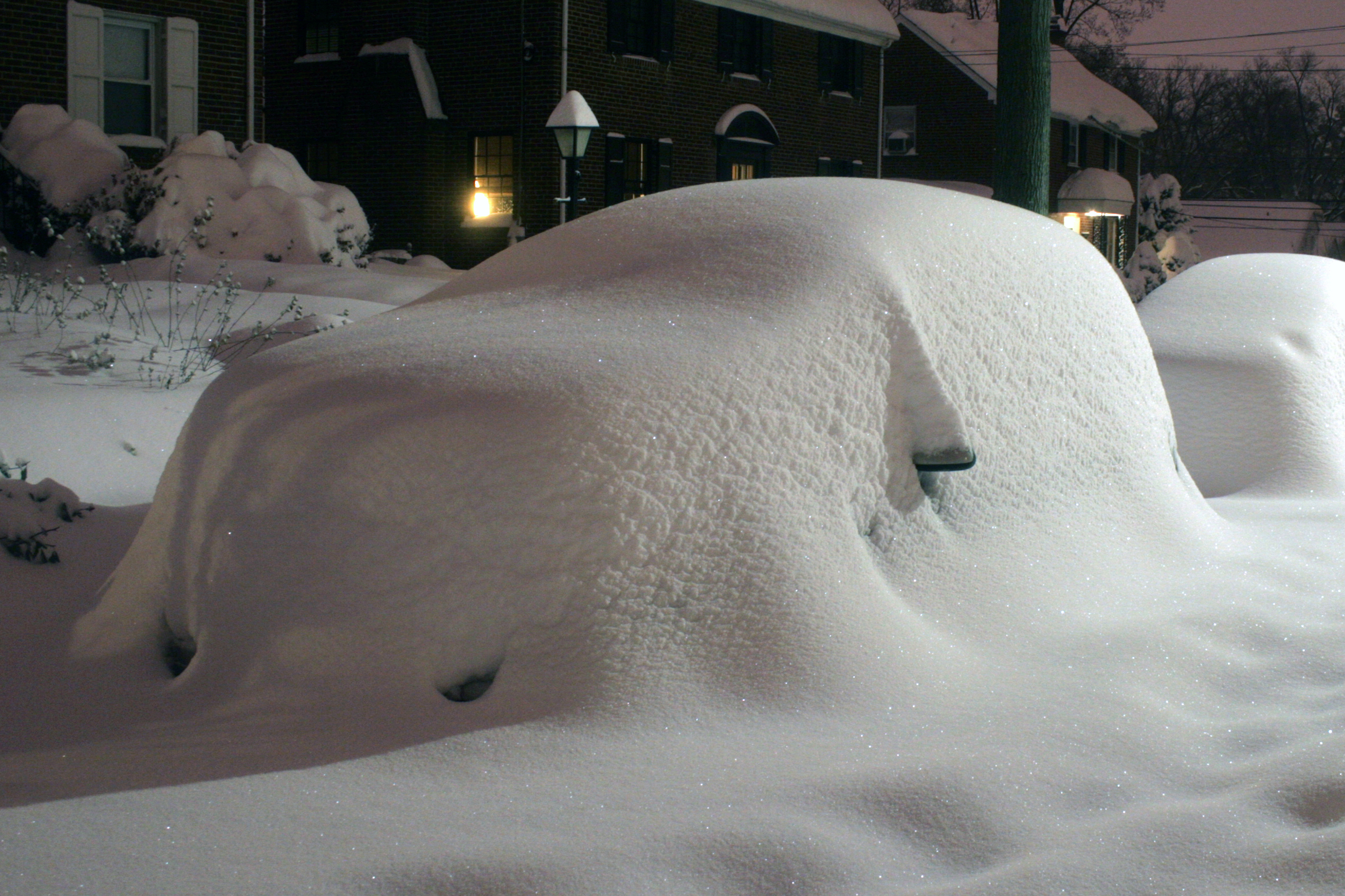
Cars buried by nearly 24 inches (61 cm) of snow in Woodley Park, Washington, D.C., on December 19.

A powerful nor'easter brought blizzard conditions to the northeastern and mid-atlantic United States, as well as Nova Scotia in Canada on 16 December. Washington, D.C., received nearly two feet (over 60 cm) of snow, setting a city record for December snowfall. New York City and southern New England were forecast to receive over a foot of snow. The snow covered most of New England, disrupting travel in New York and Pennsylvania as local record low temperatures are recorded as snow falls in Florida on the 17th. Seven people were killed as a result of the storm.

19 December 2009 also saw a meeting of both meteorological, provincial and governmental officials from across Eastern Siberia and the neighbouring provinces of Northeast China on how to cope with any future severe storms in southern Sakhalin Island and Heilongjiang Province. 8 people had died on the island by this date

=== December 20–22 ===
On December 20, nearly a foot and a half of snow fell in parts of Buncombe County and around other parts of North Carolina, with the highest amounts seen north and east of Transylvania County. This was the most snow seen in the region since 1996. Two feet of snow was recorded on Mt. Mitchell. National Guard units were mobilized to help stranded drivers and clear roads. Red Cross and National Guard shelters were opened in Buncombe, Madison and McDowell counties to accommodate travellers stranded by miles-long backups on the congested and debris-strewn I-40 and I-26. Hundreds of trees and limbs fell under the weight of the snow, blocking roads and leaving tens of thousands without power or phones. On December 22, blizzard conditions also struck Washington, D.C. Snow fall would be widely spread across the north eastern USA and most of the Eastern Seaboard.

On December 20 snow near the city of Hanover caused miles-long traffic jams on the Autobahn. There had been road 50 accidents reported on the stretch of Autobahn, which only has 5-6 accident a day in normal weather. The trains running between Warsaw and Poznań were delayed by at least an hour due to snow drifts on the tracks and fallen power lines. The Polish Meteorological Institute predicted the weather would not change for the next few days and temperatures would stay at -10C for the next couple of days. Poland, northern Germany, Scandinavia, Lithuania and Hungary would all see at least some heavy snow in places that day. Light snow was reported in most parts on continental Europe and the UK by the 22nd. Twenty-three football matches and two horse races were called off in the UK.

=== December 21, 2009—January 3, 2010 ===
In Mongolia, heavy December snowstorms killed 2,000 cattle and 2 people. The worst of the snowstorms occurred between December 21 and January 3.

=== December 21–22 ===
On December 21 blizzards disrupted New England, south western Ukraine, Düsseldorf, Frankfurt, Bosnia, Serbia, Paris, the Netherlands and London.

On December 22, a blanket of heavy snow fell upon large parts of Japan and South Korea, causing the deaths of 10 Japanese and 3 South Korean people. Snow was piled up to 184 cm high in parts of Niigata. Up to 650,000 homes and businesses lost electricity, and local trains were also halted by the power outage. In Fukui, two nuclear power plants automatically shut down due to technical problems caused by the unusually heavy snowfalls. South Korea deployed several thousand troops to clear highways and remove snow from the roofs of weak buildings after up to a metre of snow had fallen over the past two weeks. Although the storm certainly affected North Korea as well, no reports are available.

Also on the 22nd, snowstorms hit Leicestershire and Warsaw. At the same time, a Winter storm hit Moscow, Saint Petersburg, and parts of Tannu Tuva, while a Siberian cyclone started up over Yakutia and headed for Khabarovsk Krai.

=== December 22–28 ===
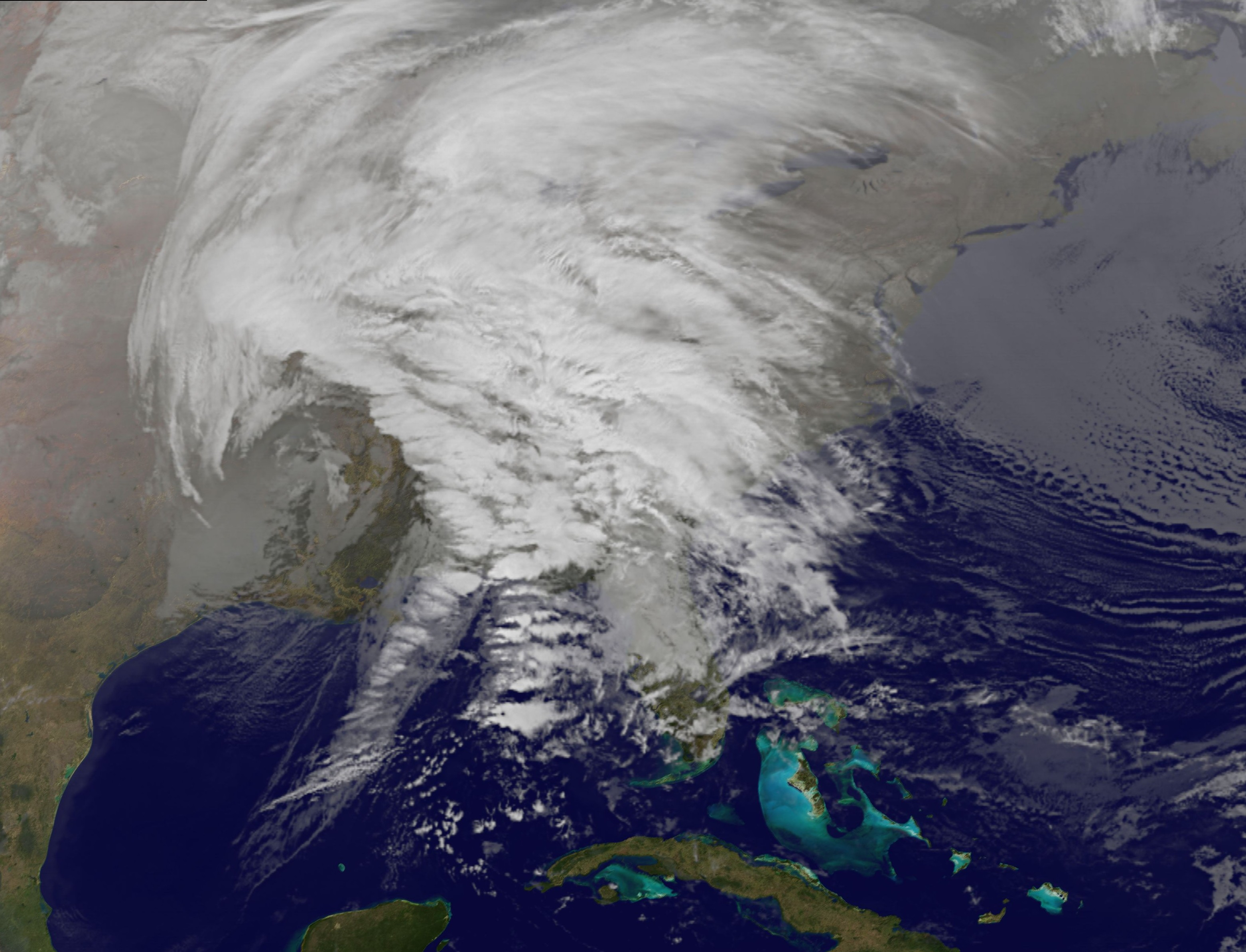
The 2009 American Christmas Winter Storm on December 24 over the Southeast United States.

Starting on December 22, a large winter storm began moving across the Great Plains and Midwest. It claimed 21 lives, canceled hundreds of flights and knocked out power across most of West Virginia. The storm stalled and spun around itself for a few days before continuing northeast. Many parts of the Great Plains experienced heavy snowfall, while places further north such as Chicago and Ottawa received freezing rain. As the snow and rain subsided on the 27th, it left record rainfalls in Texas to the Upper Midwest. The storm dumped 23.9 in (61 cm) of snow in Grand Forks, North Dakota, and 18 in (46 cm) near Norfolk, Nebraska. In the East, higher temperatures and rains have started melting and washing away last week's record-setting snowfalls, threatening the region with flooding. The National Weather Service also of flooding in parts of the South and Midwest, and winter weather advisories were in effect in sections of Nebraska, Illinois, Indiana and Michigan through the Sunday. A man drowned after slipping into the Kennebec River, near Moosehead Lake in Maine. Over 30 inches (76 cm) of snow fell in South Dakota. Several inches of snow also fell in the Las Vegas Valley, Nevada. In southern Ontario, snowsqualls fed into a cold front behind the main low pressure center of the storm to produce a rapid drop in temperatures on December 28.

An outbreak of 28 tornadoes also occurred in the Southeastern United States. One EF3 tornado caused major damage in Lufkin, Texas, injuring two people.

=== December 23, 2009—January 1, 2010 ===
December 23 to 26 saw heavy snow hit both Primorsky (Primorye) Krai, Khabarovsk Krai, Sakhalin Oblast and Kamchatka Krai. The weekend saw a migratory cyclone bringing a warm spell and snowstorms reaching Primorsky on the Friday. Heavy snow badly disrupted life in Vladivostok in December as sleet and gale-force wind occurred on Primorsky Krai's south coast. Over two days, temperatures rose from -4 °C up to -2 °C. On the night of December 26 the strengthening cyclone began drifting to the southern coast of Primorsky and over Sakhalin Krai. Snow also fell in Amur Oblast. President Vladimir Putin visited Vladivostok on the 25th.

Heavy snowfall also began in Saint Petersburg, Russia. By December 26, the city was under 35 cm of snow, creating the most December snowfall seen in the city since 1881. A snowstorm also occurred in parts of the Barents Sea.

On December 30, an emergency warning about the passage of another powerful cyclone was issued to all the territories and population centres along Russia's Pacific Coast. The gales, heavy snowfall, blizzards and a sharp fall in air temperatures hit the Sea of Okhotsk and the surrounding territories of Primorsky Krai, Sakhalin Oblast, Khabarovsk Krai and Magadan Oblast. The Far Eastern territorial centre of the federal Ministry for Emergency Situations and Civil Defence (E.M.E.R.C.O.M.) warned that the cyclone would produce snow banks, icy conditions on roads, as well as snow bringing down phone and power transmission lines in Primorsky territory. The temperatures reckoned to have fallen near the expected −7 °C. The temperature was that which usually occurs in a Siberian cyclone, when it reaches the Russian Far East. Forecasters said there was a strong possibility of heavy snowfall and blizzards along the eastern districts of the Khabarovsk Krai, in parts of the Sakhalin Island and on the southern Kuril Islands December 31 and January 1.

The last week of 2009 saw an Arctic storm bearing down on Sakhalin Island, and local officials told people not to drive their cars outside any city limits and banned the rather dangerous practice of ice fishing, due to the purported death of a Nivkh fisherman, until the storm had passed. Nonetheless, dozens of cars were buried in snow and in one village, rescuers dug out 56 cars, freeing 74 passengers and giving aid to those who were haplessly trapped. People in cars that remained stuck were being provided with both water, bread and fuel via snowmobile. The towns of Korsakov and Poronaysk were worst hit, and parts of the local taiga forests of fir and birch had been entirely up-rooted and buried by the blizzard conditions.

=== December 25–30 ===
About 60% of the Italian city of Venice was flooded by a heavy rainstorm on December the 25th.

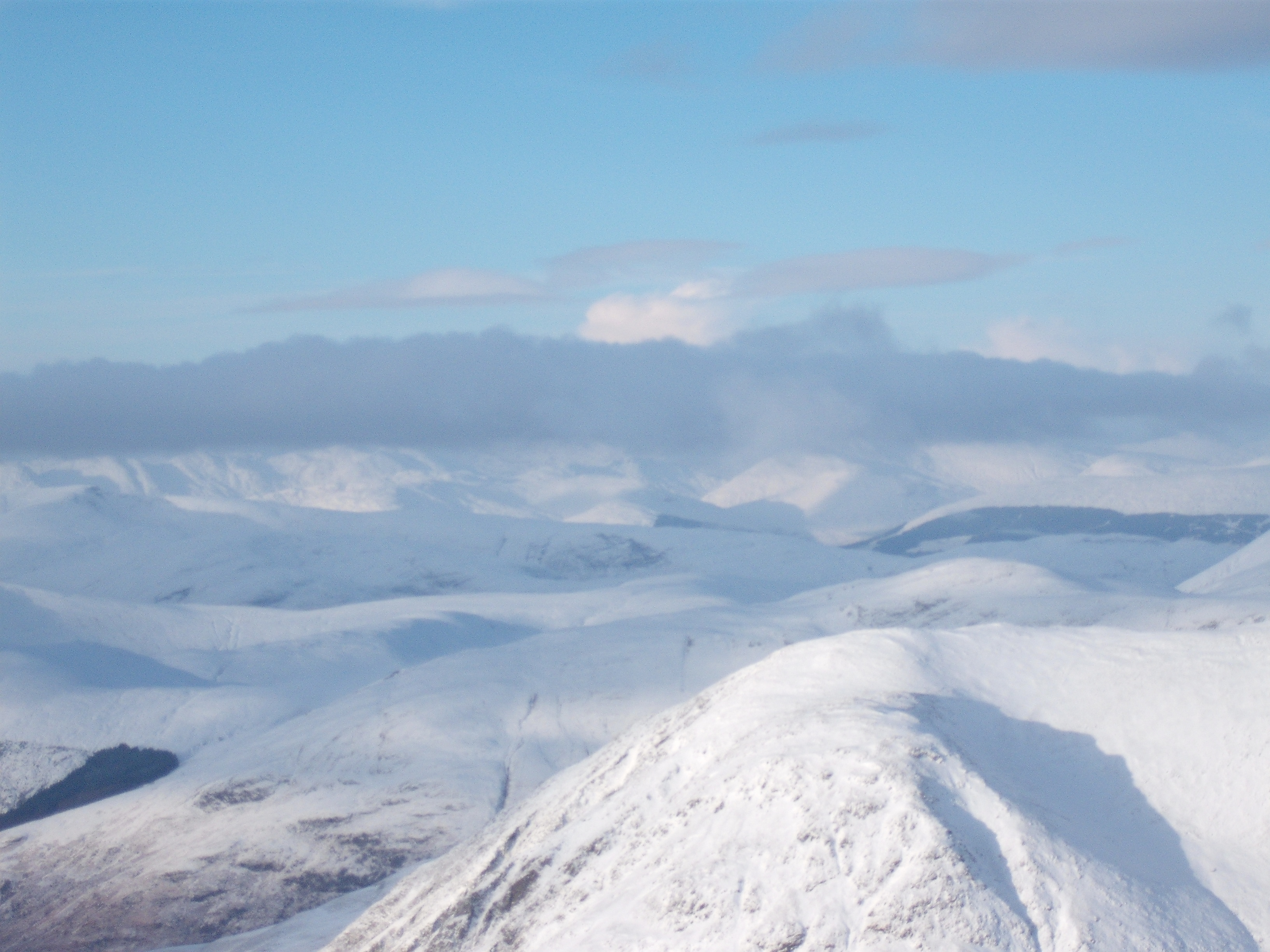
Glen Coe, Scotland, on 27 December.

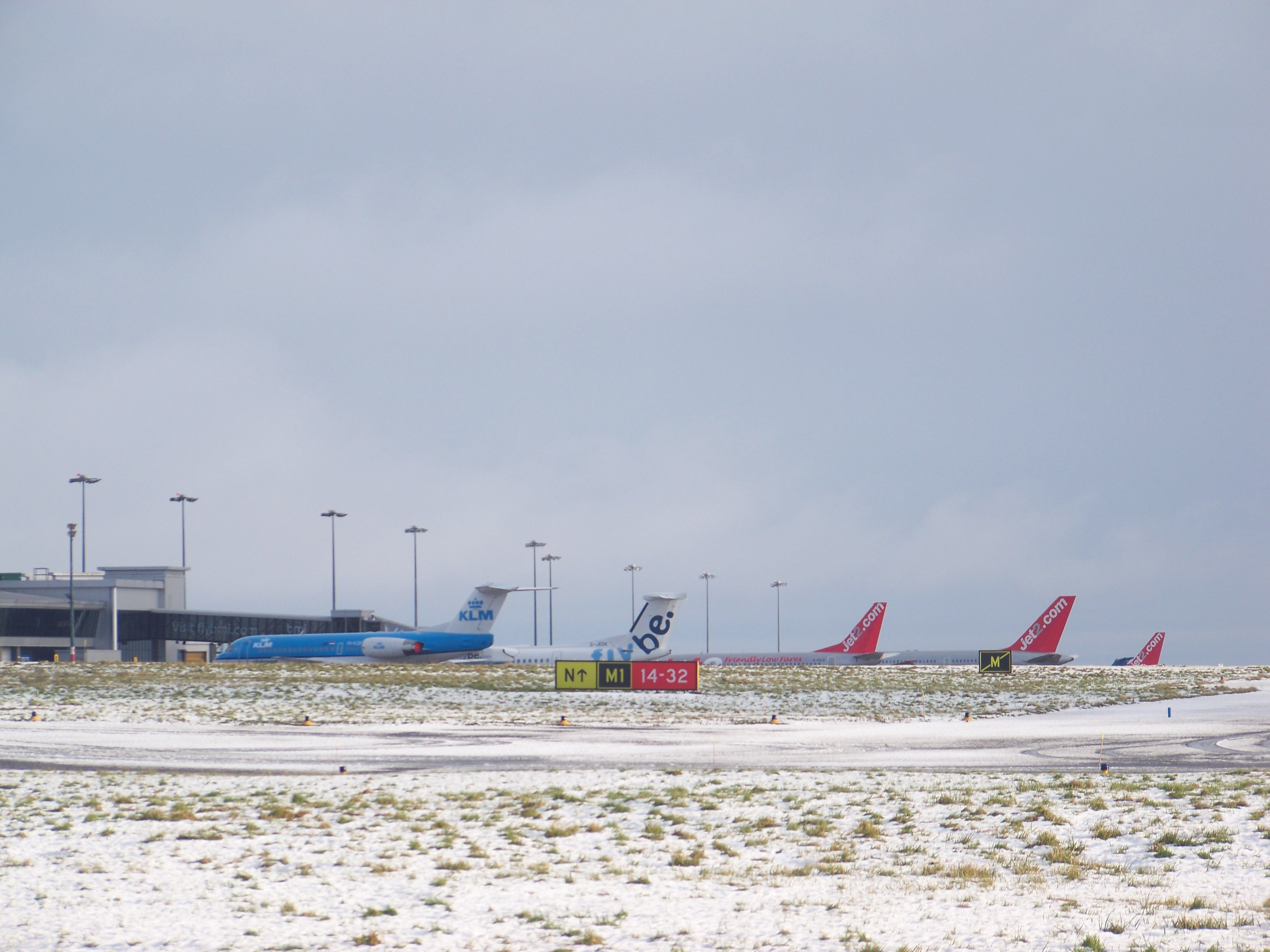
Leeds Bradford Airport following heavy snowfall on 27 December 2009.

Parts of England again suffered repeated power cuts, and Scotland experienced fresh snowfall overnight on 26–27 December with the worst affected area being Perthshire, where between 12 and 18 inches (300–460 mm) fell.

Temperatures dropped to −18 °C (0 °F) in parts of the Highlands overnight on 28–29 December, with Braemar recording Britain's lowest temperature of the winter. Fresh travel warnings were issued on 29 December as the wintry conditions continued to cause problems on Scotland's roads.

The runway of Inverness Airport was briefly closed because of snow and ice, and First ScotRail reduced services to and from Glasgow Central because of the severe conditions.

The snow and icy conditions were good for the Scottish ski industry, which said the weather helped it to experience its best start to the season for several years.

Warnings of heavy snow were issued for Wales, the Midlands, north-west England, eastern and southern England, and Yorkshire and Humber. More snow began falling across parts of Wales and central and northern England on the evening of 29 December, with Wales recording the heaviest of the snow showers where some rural areas were cut off by of up to 30 centimetres (12 in). Snow was also reported in parts of the West Midlands region and Yorkshire.

In Italy, December 30 saw hundreds of homes in Tuscany evacuated because of flooding and Spain's rescue services were on yellow danger alert after flash floods destroyed roads and landslides swept railways away. Transport Links between Almeria, Granada, Málaga and Sevilla were severed. Drought-blighted Andalusia has had its fifth day of rain, and Portugal was on orange flood alert. Authorities said the rain had destroyed millions of Euros worth of agricultural produce. The harbours were closed and the Madeira archipelago islands were also under threat of both flooding and gale-force winds, as 110 km/h whipped up six-metre -high waves.

=== December 28, 2009—January 3, 2010 ===
At least two of the Russian Far East storms stacked up over the Gulf of Alaska during December 28. Various weather forecasts suggested that one would spread valley rain and mountain snow across Northern California and drop up to half an inch of rain across the northern Sacramento Valley over the next few days. The National Weather Service issued a Winter Weather Advisory warning for the Mount Shasta area, where forecasters expected 1 to 3 inches (76 mm) of snow in town and up to 10 inches (250 mm) above 5,000 feet (1,500 m). The second cold front, and its related storm, would bring more rain and high country snow to the north state by New Year's Eve or New Year's Day.

The blizzards began on New Year's Eve, and lasted until January 3. The worst of the blizzards occurred on December 31, when an avalanche derailed a diesel locomotive fitted with a railway snowplough off its railway tracks. The storm continued through 1 January, when three workers sent to repair the damage were swept away by the howling blizzard that was ripping through Sakhalin Island according to the RIA Novosti news service. One worker was found alive and rescue teams retrieved the body of a second Sunday morning. The situation worsened to the point that 140 soldiers were ordered to help dig the train out from beneath 350,000 cubic feet (9,900 m^{3}) of snow. A local man, Andrei Sukhonosov, trying to return home to the city of Tomari was on the buried train.

Authorities and rescue services in Sakhalin Oblast were put on alert, and warned of a high risk of avalanches on the island's numerous hills and mountains. Another avalanche warning was issued on the 2nd, for Sakhalin Island, due to hazardous levels of snowfall during yet another Siberian snow cyclone and blizzard, emergency officials said. The authorities in Primorsky and Khabarovsk Krai were also put on alert, just in case things got ant worse. The last two Russian Far Eastern storms dissipated in the Gulf of Alaska on January 5 and 6 respectively.

=== December 29–31 ===
Following the deadly 2009 North American Christmas winter storm, a medium-sized nor'easter formed in Texas and brought moderate snow to the western portion of the state on December 29. In anticipation of the event Texas Governor Rick Perry activated his resources ahead of the winter storm. It then moved through the Southeast and brought heavy rain and freezing rain to higher altitudes. Some snow was reported in Clayton, Georgia, but did not accumulate. It then moved quickly up the East Coast of the United States, bringing freezing rain and sleet to the Mid-Atlantic and moderate to heavy snow to the Tri-State Area (New York, New Jersey, Connecticut). 5 inches (13 cm) at the most was reported in White Plains 4.5 inches (11 cm) in Hartford. It then brought about 2 inches (5.1 cm) to Boston and southeastern New England. Overnight January 1, it strengthened explosively over water and looped back around to create a blizzard in northern New England. Up to 19 inches (48 cm) was on the ground in Lubec, Maine, by Sunday, and on Saturday it moved to southern New England. 13 inches (33 cm) fell in Lexington, Massachusetts, making that the most fallen in southern New England in the season. Boston received 9 inches (23 cm). The storm moved into the Labrador Sea by Sunday afternoon, leaving behind a pattern where multiple storms within the broader low undergo cyclogenesis to track north of Newfoundland.

Sportscotland Avalanche Information Service (SAIS) issued warnings about conditions on Scottish mountains on December 30. However, three people died in three large avalanches. Two climbers were killed as a result of an avalanche on Ben Nevis, while a man was airlifted from Liathach, a mountain in Torridon, after getting into trouble, and died in hospital.

Continued icy weather in Scotland on New Year's Eve led to the cancellation of Hogmanay celebrations in Inverness amid concerns over public safety. New Year celebrations in other parts of Scotland went ahead as planned. North-east Scotland experienced fresh snowfall during the afternoon and evening of 31 December. For a second time that week Inverness Airport was closed forcing several hundred passengers to make alternative arrangements. In Batley, West Yorkshire 2,500 imperial gallons (11 m^{3}) of water leaked into the local gas network, leaving 400 homes in Dewsbury and Batley without gas during sub-zero temperatures. The final homes were reconnected on 7 January.

December 31 to January 5 saw heavy flooding in southern Spain and heavy snow in northern Spain.

== Fatalities ==
The death toll finally stood at:

| Nation | Fatalities |
|---|---|
| Saudi Arabia | 100 (estimated) |
| Bolivia | 52 |
| Peru | 19 |
| Ecuador | 16 |
| India | 205 |
| Italy | 1 |
| North Korea | 1 (unconfirmed) |
| Poland | 119 |
| Czech Republic | 1 |
| Pakistan | 29 |
| Slovakia | 1 |
| Hungary | 1 |
| Taiwan | 462 |
| The PRC | 84 |
| Romania | 11 |
| USA | 60 |
| Russia | 11 |
| UK | 27 |
| France | 1 |
| Portugal | 1 |
| Mongolia | 55 |
| Haiti | 5 |
| Austria | 3 |
| Mexico | 9 |

== Political impact ==
Much of the snowstorm activity coincided with Copenhagen Summit of December 2009 as well as the Climatic Research Unit email controversy one month prior. The unusual weather patterns that year (particularly in the Southern United States) provided an opportunity to promote or question the theory of global warming, and led to an increasing use of the phrase "climate change" as opposed to "global warming."

== Gallery ==
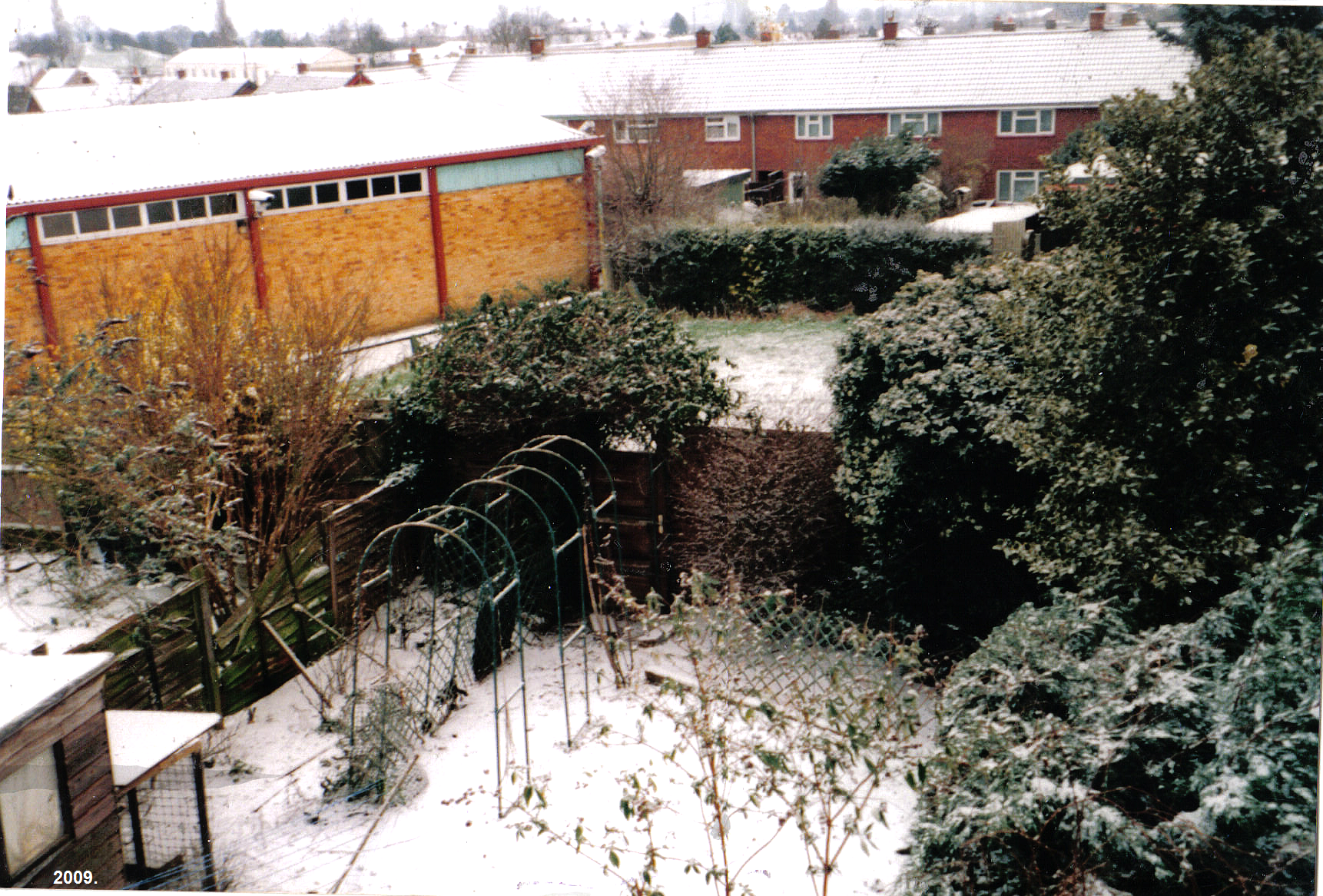
Snow fall in Banbury during December 2009.

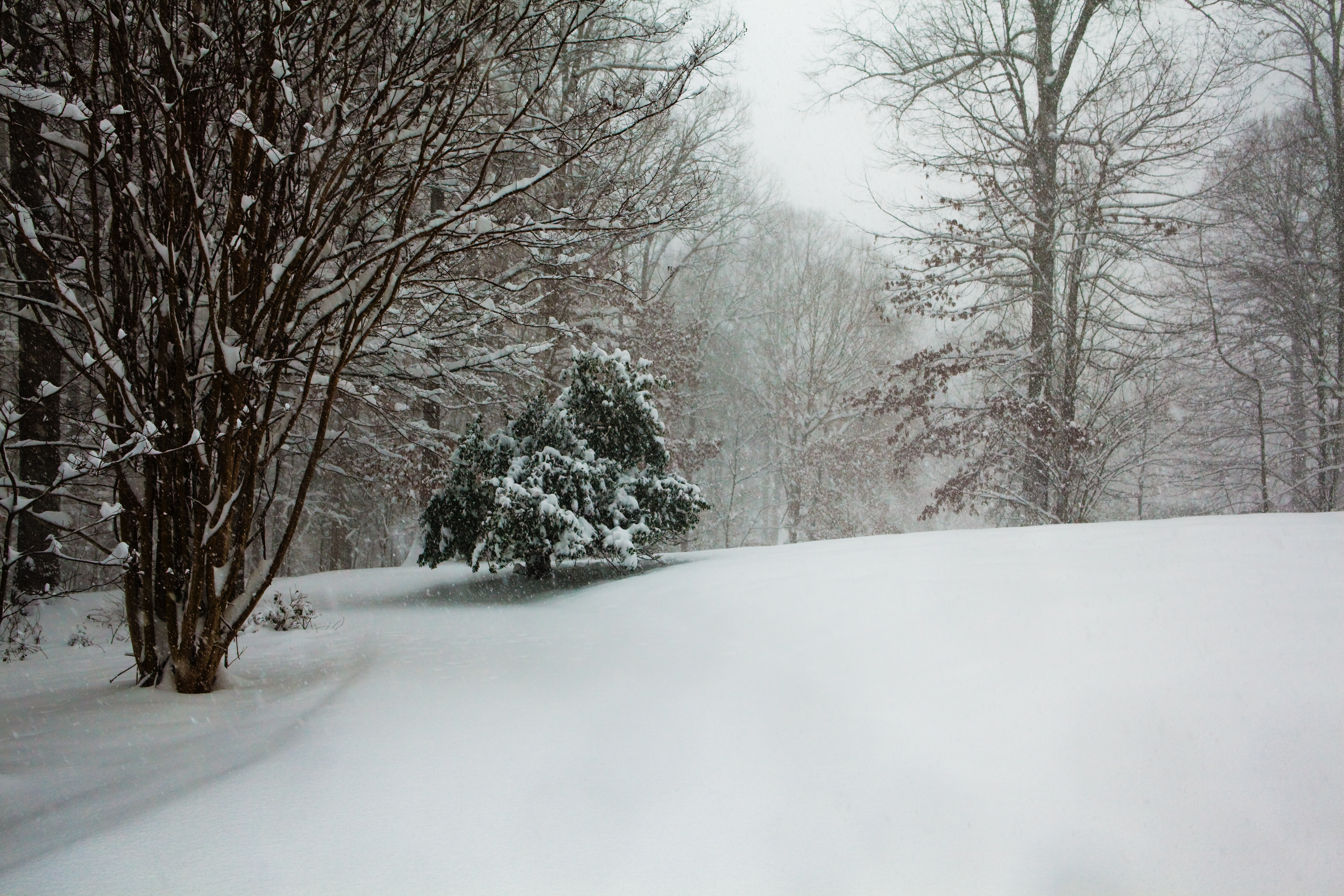
Snowfall during the blizzard in Clifton, Virginia, U.S.A., completely covers a road and reduces visibility on 19 December 2009.

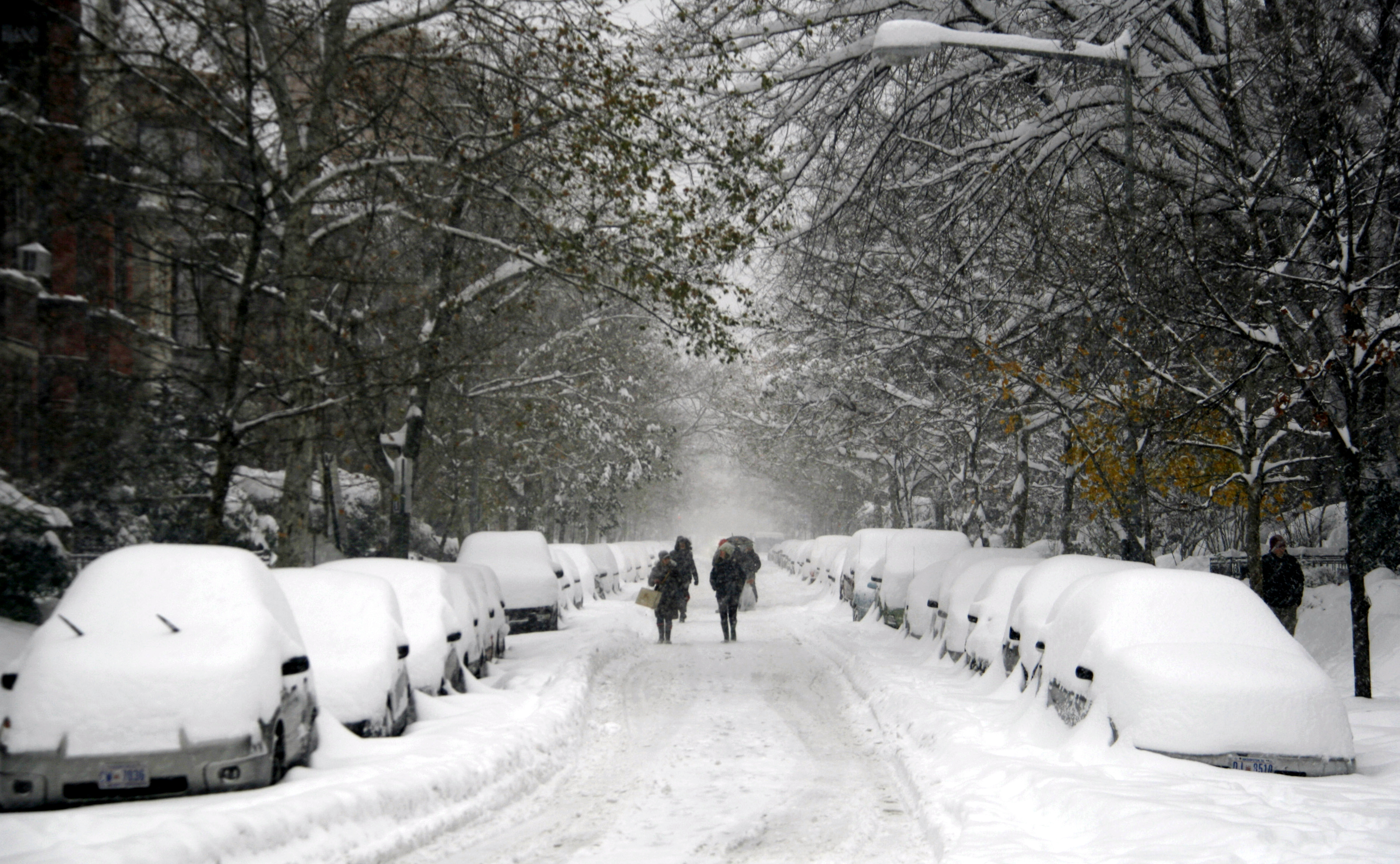
Streetscape of the Dupont Circle neighborhood of Washington, D.C., on 19 December 2009.

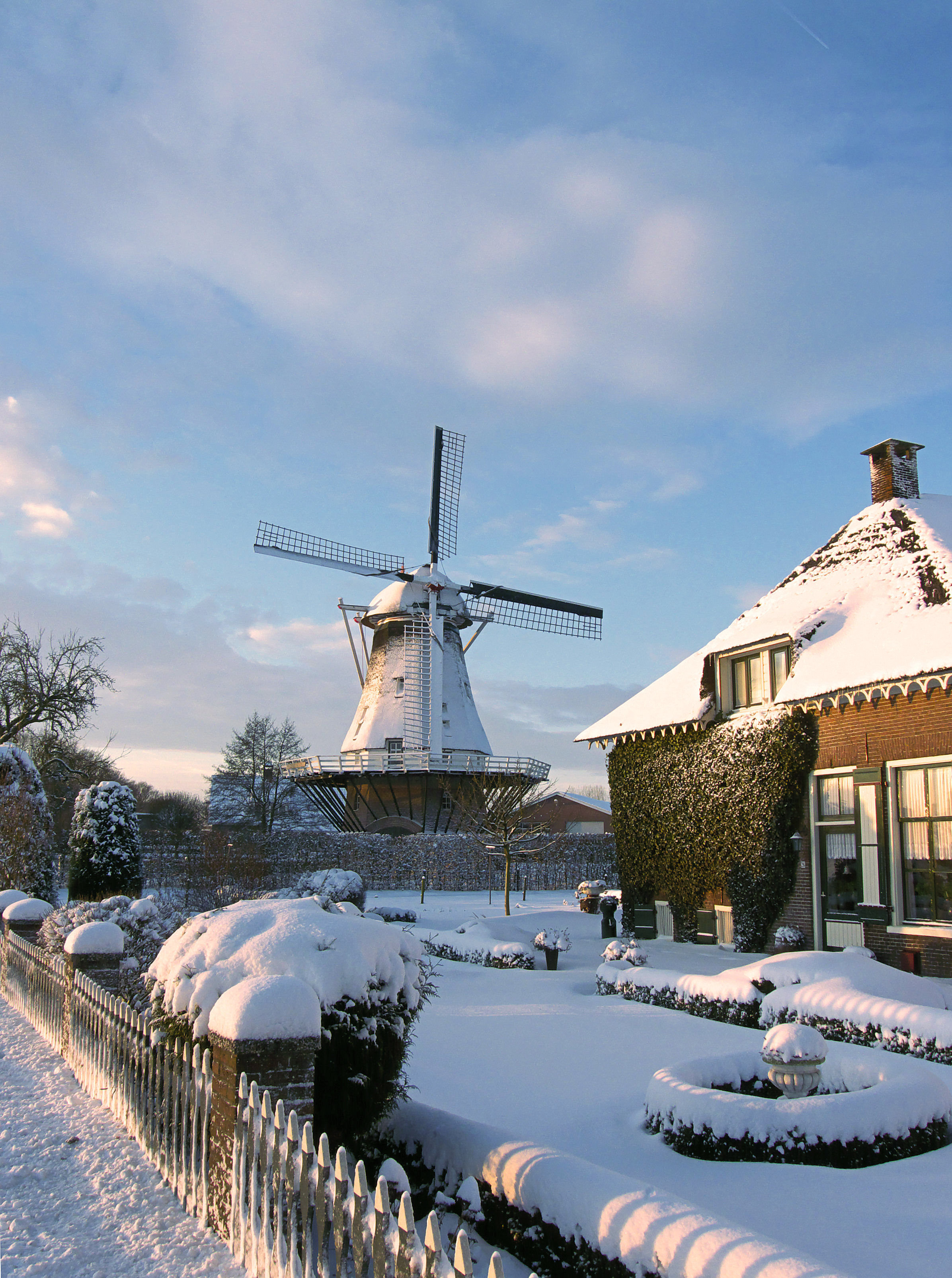
Ede, Netherlands, on 20 December.

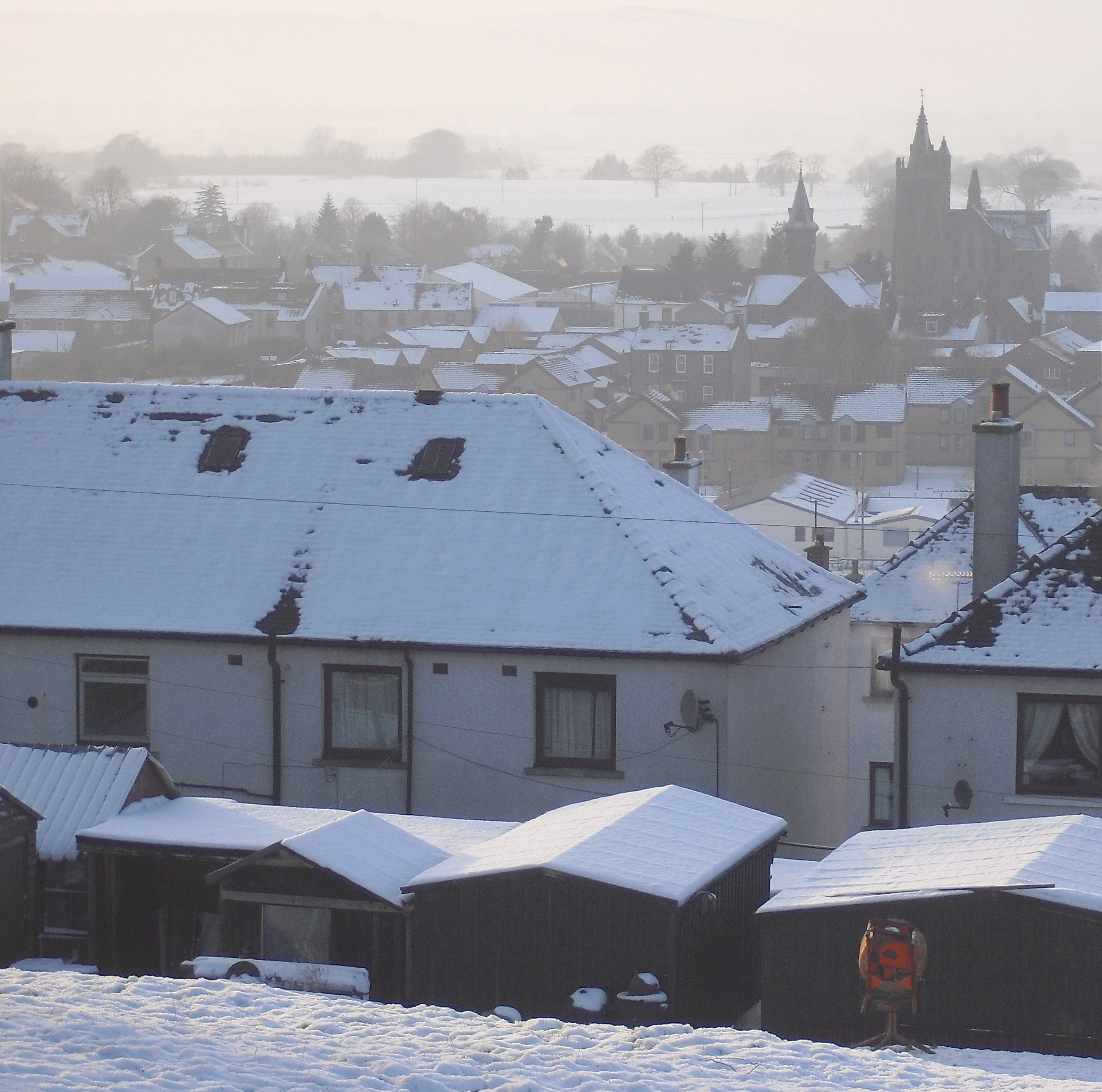
Lockerbie, Scotland, on 25 December.

== See also ==
- Winter storm
- Winter of 2009–10 in Europe
- 2009 West Africa floods
- 2013–14 North American winter
- Global storm activity of 2008
- Global storm activity of 2010
- Winter storms of 2009–10 in East Asia
- 2010 Northern Hemisphere heat waves
- Global storm activity of 2008
- Winter of 1946–47 in the United Kingdom
- Winter of 1962–63 in the United Kingdom
- February 2009 Great Britain and Ireland snowfall
- Winter of 1990–91 in Western Europe
- Cyclogenesis
- Jet stream
- Arctic oscillation
- North Atlantic oscillation
- Pacific–North American teleconnection pattern
- El Niño–Southern Oscillation
- Gulf Stream
- European windstorm
- Global storm activity of 2007
- Global storm activity of 2006

Global weather by year
| Preceded by 2008 | Weather of 2009 | Succeeded by 2010 |
