= Tempo River =

Small river in County Fermanagh, Northern Ireland

Coordinates: 54°16′52″N 7°29′10″W

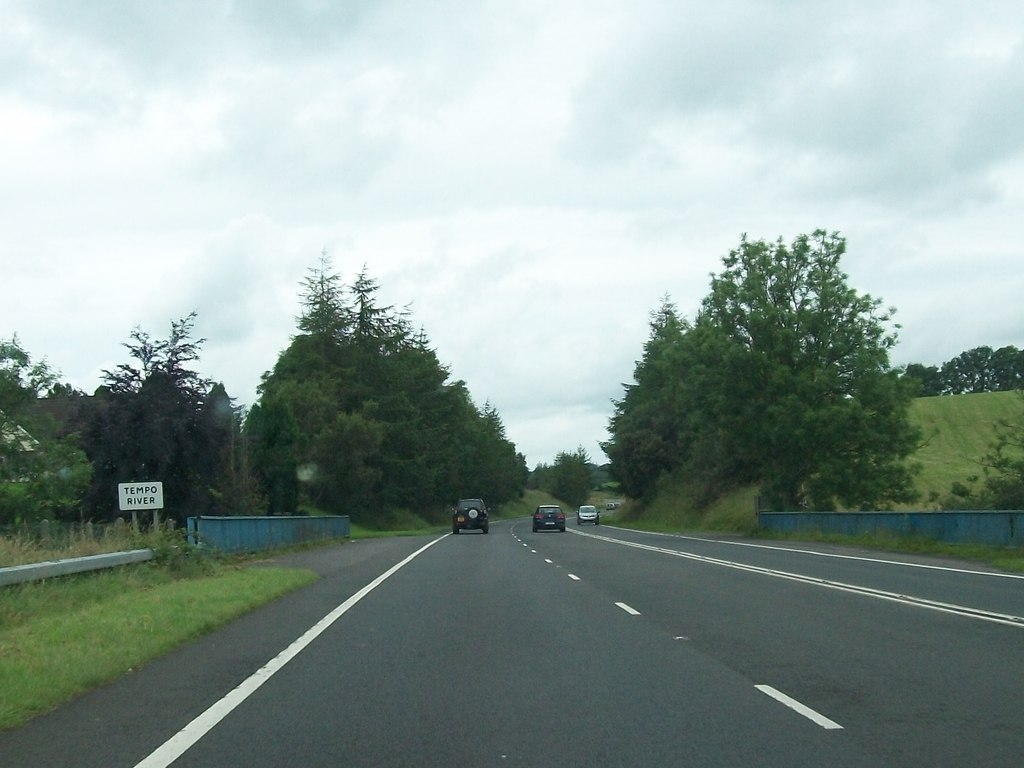
- Tempo River Bridge

Location
- Country: Northern Ireland
- County: County Fermanagh

The Tempo River is a small river in County Fermanagh, Northern Ireland. The river rises near Dooneen Forest, flows through the town of Tempo, finally joining with the Colebrooke River before it enters Upper Lough Erne. The Tempo River locale has been designated as an Area of Special Scientific Interest in Northern Ireland.

The underlying geology of the river is old red sandstone, carboniferous limestone and basal clastic bedrock with extensive sand and gravel deposits throughout its length. The river is lowland riffle and run dominated with occasional deeper sections of glide.

The Tempo is one of the few rivers in Northern Ireland which still retains a substantial population of the freshwater pearl mussel. This species was once very common, covering large areas of riverbed in many of the river systems of Northern Ireland. In recent decades it has undergone a dramatic decline and has totally disappeared from all but a small number of rivers. The decline has been largely due to historical pearl fishing and more recently river engineering works and poor water quality. Remnant populations such as that occurring at the Tempo River are of considerable conservation importance as they are generally genetically and morphologically distinct and may be useful in any future conservation or reintroduction programme. The Freshwater Pearl Mussel population in Tempo River was assessed as 'stable' in a 2018 study by the Joint Nature Conservation Committee.

Animals found in the river include otters, white-clawed crayfish, kingfishers, Atlantic salmon, and brown trout.

== See also ==
- List of rivers of Ireland
