= Colebrooke River =

River in Northern Ireland, part of the Erne system

Coordinates: 54°15′N 7°30′W

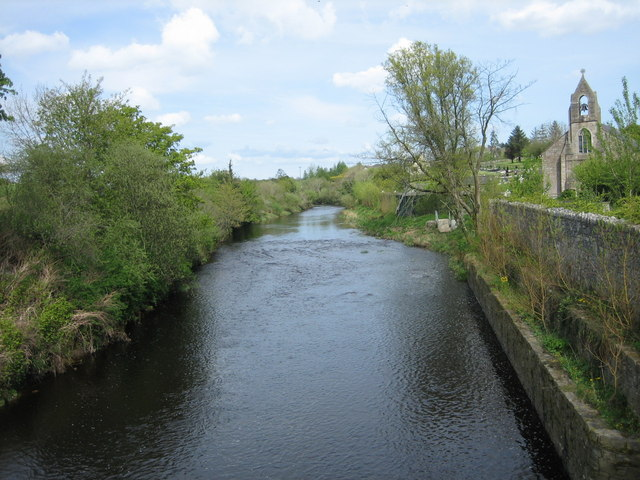
The Colebrooke River. Looking upstream at Maguiresbridge.

The Colebrooke River (Irish: An Abha Dhubh) is a river in County Fermanagh, Northern Ireland. Its source is in the Sliabh Beagh mountains where it is known as the Many Burns.

The river flows in a south-westerly direction, through Maguiresbridge, before merging with the Tempo River and finally entering Upper Lough Erne near Inishcollan, Lisnaskea.

== Angling ==
The river has abundant large bream, roach, perch, rudd and pike. At the end of the season salmon and trout can be caught as they move from Lough Erne to their spawning grounds in the river's upper reaches.

Some of the river is private fishing water on the Colebrooke Park estate.

== Geology ==
The Brookeborough Diamond, the only gem-quality diamond to have been found in Ireland, was discovered in the Colebrooke River in 1816. Karelian Diamond Resources plc, a Dublin-based company, was awarded a prospecting licence in the area in 2019 and undertook a sampling program which found chromite in stream sediments from the river.

== See also ==
- List of rivers of Ireland
