= Shūzō =

- Gender: Male

Origin
- Origin: Japanese
- Meaning: Different meanings depending on the kanji used

Shūzō, Shuzo, Shuhzoh or Shuuzou (written: 周造, 周藏, 修造, 修三 or 秀三) is a masculine Japanese given name. Notable people with the name include:

- Aoki Shūzō (青木 周藏; 1844–1914), Japanese diplomat and politician
- Shuzo Awaji (淡路 修三; born 1949), Japanese Go player
- Kuki Shūzō (九鬼 周造; 1888–1941), Japanese academic and philosopher
- Shuzo Matsuoka (松岡 修造; born 1967), Japanese tennis player
- Shuzo Ohira (大平 修三; 1930–1998), Japanese Go player
- Shūzō Oshimi (押見 修造; born 1981), Japanese manga artist
- Shūzō Takiguchi (瀧口 修造; 1903–1979), Japanese poet, art critic and artist
- Shuzo Yajima (矢島 秀三; 1946–2006), Japanese water polo player
