= List of townlands of County Roscommon =

This is a sortable table of the approximately 2,060 townlands in County Roscommon, Ireland.

Duplicate names occur where there is more than one townland with the same name in the county. Names marked in bold typeface are towns and villages, and the word Town appears for those entries in the Acres column.

== Townland list ==
| Townland | Acres | Barony | Civil parish | Poor law union |
|---|---|---|---|---|
| Abbeycartron | 32 | Roscommon | Elphin | Strokestown |
| Acres | 125 | Frenchpark | Kilmacumsy | Boyle |
| Acres | 133 | Ballintober South | Roscommon | Roscommon |
| Adragool | 231 | Castlereagh | Kilkeevin | Castlereagh |
| Aghabehy | 537 | Boyle | Kilronan | Boyle |
| Aghacarra | 587 | Boyle | Boyle | Boyle |
| Aghaclogher | 200 | Roscommon | Cloonfinlough | Roscommon |
| Aghacurreen | 761 | Frenchpark | Tibohine | Castlereagh |
| Aghadangan | 145 | Roscommon | Lissonuffy | Strokestown |
| Aghaderry | 397 | Frenchpark | Tibohine | Castlereagh |
| Aghadrestan | 563 | Frenchpark | Tibohine | Castlereagh |
| Aghafin | 561 | Boyle | Kilronan | Boyle |
| Aghagad | 420 | Athlone | Fuerty | Roscommon |
| Aghagad Beg & Creemully | 940 | Athlone | Fuerty | Roscommon |
| Aghagower | 731 | Athlone | Fuerty | Roscommon |
| Aghagowla | 311 | Boyle | Boyle | Boyle |
| Aghalahard | 150 | Roscommon | Cloonfinlough | Roscommon |
| Aghalour | 680 | Frenchpark | Tibohine | Castlereagh |
| Aghalustia | 1,180 | Frenchpark | Castlemore | Castlereagh |
| Aghamannan | 116 | Ballintober North | Kilglass | Strokestown |
| Aghamore | 200 | Roscommon | Aughrim | Carrick on Shannon |
| Aghamore | 59 | Roscommon | Lissonuffy | Strokestown |
| Aghamuck | 189 | Ballintober South | Kilgefin | Roscommon |
| Aghawaracahill | 35 | Ballintober North | Kilmore | Carrick on Shannon |
| Aghawerriny | 166 | Ballintober South | Kilgefin | Roscommon |
| Aghloonagh | 59 | Roscommon | Ogulla | Strokestown |
| Aghmagree | 521 | Ballintober South | Kilteevan | Roscommon |
| Aghnagrange | 100 | Boyle | Boyle | Boyle |
| Aghnasurn | 70 | Boyle | Kilbryan | Boyle |
| Aghoo | 219 | Boyle | Ardcarn | Boyle |
| Aghrafinigan | 282 | Boyle | Ardcarn | Boyle |
| Alderford | 251 | Boyle | Kilronan | Boyle |
| Altagowlan | 583 | Boyle | Kilronan | Boyle |
| Altoghil | 64 | Boyle | Kilronan | Boyle |
| Altore | 286 | Castlereagh | Kiltullagh | Castlereagh |
| America | 291 | Moycarn | Moore | Ballinasloe |
| Annacloghan | 36 | Boyle | Kilronan | Boyle |
| Annagh | 241 | Boyle | Kilronan | Boyle |
| Annagh | 103 | Ballintober North | Kilmore | Carrick on Shannon |
| Annagh | 541 | Castlereagh | Kilkeevin | Castlereagh |
| Annagh (or Drumanilra) | 166 | Boyle | Kilbryan | Boyle |
| Annaghbeg | 249 | Boyle | Tumna | Carrick on Shannon |
| Annaghbeg | 271 | Roscommon | Killukin | Strokestown |
| Annaghmaghera | 477 | Castlereagh | Kilkeevin | Castlereagh |
| Annaghmagurthan | 38 | Boyle | Ardcarn | Carrick on Shannon |
| Annaghmona | 34 | Boyle | Tumna | Carrick on Shannon |
| Annaghmore | 151 | Ballintober South | Kilteevan | Roscommon |
| Annaghmore | 388 | Roscommon | Ogulla | Strokestown |
| Anrittabeg | 320 | Ballintober South | Cloontuskert | Roscommon |
| Araghty | 577 | Athlone | Athleague | Roscommon |
| Ardagawna | 242 | Athlone | Drum | Athlone |
| Ardagh | 345 | Frenchpark | Kilcolagh | Boyle |
| Ardakillin | 554 | Roscommon | Killukin | Strokestown |
| Ardanaffrin | 82 | Ballintober North | Kilmore | Carrick on Shannon |
| Ardass | 134 | Castlereagh | Kilkeevin | Castlereagh |
| Ardcarn | 264 | Moycarn | Creagh | Ballinasloe |
| Ardcarn | 631 | Boyle | Ardcarn | Boyle |
| Ardchamoyle | 49 | Boyle | Tumna | Carrick on Shannon |
| Ardcolagh | 229 | Frenchpark | Kilmacumsy | Boyle |
| Ardcollum | 65 | Boyle | Kilronan | Boyle |
| Ardcolman | 171 | Athlone | Dysart | Athlone |
| Ardconra | 190 | Boyle | Ardcarn | Boyle |
| Ardcoran | 54 | Boyle | Boyle | Boyle |
| Ardcorcoran | 54 | Boyle | Boyle | Boyle |
| Ardeash | 156 | Boyle | Ardcarn | Boyle |
| Ardeevin | 515 | Castlereagh | Baslick | Castlereagh |
| Ardgallagher | 165 | Ballintober North | Kilmore | Carrick on Shannon |
| Ardglass | 254 | Boyle | Ardcarn | Boyle |
| Ardkeel | 421 | Ballintober South | Roscommon | Roscommon |
| Ardkeenagh | 206 | Boyle | Estersnow | Boyle |
| Ardkeenagh | 202 | Roscommon | Kilcooley | Strokestown |
| Ardkeenagh Plunkett | 245 | Roscommon | Kilcooley | Strokestown |
| Ardkeenan | 950 | Athlone | Drum | Athlone |
| Ardlagheen Beg | 209 | Ballymoe | Cloonygormican | Roscommon |
| Ardlagheen More (or Highlake) | 528 | Ballymoe | Cloonygormican | Castlereagh |
| Ardlavagh | 165 | Boyle | Killukin | Carrick on Shannon |
| Ardleckna | 192 | Roscommon | Aughrim | Carrick on Shannon |
| Ardlougher | 127 | Roscommon | Aughrim | Carrick on Shannon |
| Ardmacroan | 67 | Ballintober North | Kilmore | Carrick on Shannon |
| Ardmore | 262 | Boyle | Boyle | Boyle |
| Ardmore | 383 | Boyle | Killukin | Boyle |
| Ardmore | 110 | Frenchpark | Kilnamanagh | Castlereagh |
| Ardmore | 702 | Ballymoe | Dunamon | Roscommon |
| Ardmoyle | 188 | Frenchpark | Kilnamanagh | Boyle |
| Ardmullan | 628 | Athlone | Cam | Athlone |
| Ardnaglug | 1,048 | Moycarn | Moore | Ballinasloe |
| Ardnagowna | 183 | Roscommon | Elphin | Strokestown |
| Ardnamullagh | 81 | Castlereagh | Ballintober | Castlereagh |
| Ardnanagh | 221 | Ballintober South | Roscommon | Roscommon |
| Ardnanure | 82 | Athlone | Drum | Athlone |
| Ardsallagh | 192 | Boyle | Boyle | Boyle |
| Ardsallagh Beg | 206 | Ballintober South | Roscommon | Roscommon |
| Ardsallagh More | 270 | Ballintober South | Roscommon | Roscommon |
| Arignagh | 45 | Ballymoe | Oran | Roscommon |
| Arm | 823 | Castlereagh | Kilkeevin | Castlereagh |
| Arraghan | 344 | Castlereagh | Kilcorkey | Castlereagh |
| Ash Islands | 1 | Boyle | Kilbryan | Boyle |
| Ashbrook (or Knocknabarnaboy) | 246 | Roscommon | Lissonuffy | Strokestown |
| Ashford | 414 | Moycarn | Creagh | Ballinasloe |
| Ashpark | 241 | Ballymoe | Drumatemple | Castlereagh |
| Assaun | 127 | Frenchpark | Creeve | Carrick on Shannon |
| **Athleague** | Town | Athlone | Athleague | Roscommon |
| Athleague | 325 | Athlone | Athleague | Roscommon |
| **Athlone** | Town | Athlone | St. Peter's | Athlone |
| Athlone & Bigmeadow | 111 | Athlone | St. Peter's | Athlone |
| Athroe | 111 | Roscommon | Shankill | Boyle |
| Atteagh | 211 | Athlone | Kiltoom | Athlone |
| Attiaghygrana | 178 | Frenchpark | Creeve | Carrick on Shannon |
| Attiballa | 35 | Roscommon | Elphin | Strokestown |
| Atticorra | 399 | Moycarn | Creagh | Ballinasloe |
| Attiknockan | 249 | Athlone | Tisrara | Roscommon |
| Attirory | 546 | Moycarn | Creagh | Ballinasloe |
| Attishane | 233 | Castlereagh | Kiltullagh | Castlereagh |
| Aughrim | 347 | Roscommon | Aughrim | Carrick on Shannon |
| Ballagh | 1,210 | Athlone | Rahara | Athlone |
| Ballagh | 169 | Ballintober North | Kilmore | Carrick on Shannon |
| Ballagh | 183 | Ballintober South | Kilgefin | Roscommon |
| Ballaghabawbeg | 427 | Castlereagh | Baslick | Castlereagh |
| Ballaghabawmore | 224 | Roscommon | Ogulla | Strokestown |
| Ballaghcullia | 361 | Castlereagh | Kilcorkey | Castlereagh |
| Ballina | 223 | Athlone | Taghboy | Athlone |
| Ballinaboy | 96 | Ballintober South | Roscommon | Roscommon |
| Ballinafad | 272 | Roscommon | Cloonfinlough | Strokestown |
| Ballinagard | 404 | Ballintober South | Roscommon | Roscommon |
| **Ballinasloe** | Town | Moycarn | Creagh | Ballinasloe |
| Ballincool | 118 | Castlereagh | Kilcorkey | Castlereagh |
| Ballincurry | 192 | Ballintober South | Kilgefin | Roscommon |
| Ballindall | 242 | Ballintober South | Roscommon | Roscommon |
| Ballinderry | 1,411 | Ballintober South | Kilbride | Roscommon |
| Ballindollaghan (Crump) | 428 | Castlereagh | Baslick | Castlereagh |
| Ballindollaghan (Knox) | 298 | Castlereagh | Baslick | Castlereagh |
| Ballindrehid | 51 | Boyle | Killukin | Carrick on Shannon |
| Ballindrumlea | 774 | Castlereagh | Kilkeevin | Castlereagh |
| Ballinlig | 381 | Athlone | Fuerty | Roscommon |
| Ballinlig | 165 | Athlone | Kilmeane | Roscommon |
| **Ballinlough** | Town | Castlereagh | Kiltullagh | Castlereagh |
| Ballinlough | 189 | Castlereagh | Kiltullagh | Castlereagh |
| Ballinoughquarter | 107 | Castlereagh | Kiltullagh | Castlereagh |
| Ballinphuill | 122 | Boyle | Boyle | Boyle |
| Ballinphuill | 60 | Castlereagh | Kilkeevin | Castlereagh |
| Ballinphuill | 481 | Frenchpark | Tibohine | Castlereagh |
| Ballinross | 381 | Castlereagh | Kiltullagh | Castlereagh |
| Ballintemple | 110 | Roscommon | Cloonfinlough | Strokestown |
| Ballintober | 58 | Castlereagh | Ballintober | Castlereagh |
| Ballinturly | 408 | Ballymoe | Cloonygormican | Roscommon |
| Ballinturly | 367 | Athlone | Fuerty | Roscommon |
| Ballinvilla | 406 | Boyle | Killummod | Carrick on Shannon |
| Ballinvoher | 177 | Boyle | Estersnow | Boyle |
| Ballinvoher | 192 | Frenchpark | Kilnamanagh | Boyle |
| Ballinwully | 164 | Ballintober South | Kilgefin | Roscommon |
| Balloony | 132 | Castlereagh | Baslick | Castlereagh |
| Bally Beg | 53 | Roscommon | Lissonuffy | Strokestown |
| Bally More | 192 | Roscommon | Lissonuffy | Strokestown |
| Ballyardan | 103 | Boyle | Ardcarn | Boyle |
| Ballybane (Reynolds) | 145 | Castlereagh | Kiltullagh | Castlereagh |
| Ballybane Lower | 151 | Castlereagh | Kiltullagh | Castlereagh |
| Ballybane Upper | 92 | Castlereagh | Kiltullagh | Castlereagh |
| Ballybaun | 97 | Boyle | Boyle | Boyle |
| Ballybeg | 257 | Roscommon | Ogulla | Strokestown |
| Ballyboughan | 261 | Ballintober South | Roscommon | Roscommon |
| Ballybride | 486 | Ballintober South | Roscommon | Roscommon |
| Ballybrogan | 591 | Athlone | St. Johns | Athlone |
| Ballybroghan | 134 | Roscommon | Kilcooley | Strokestown |
| Ballyclare | 283 | Ballintober South | Cloontuskert | Roscommon |
| Ballyclare Island | 2 | Ballintober South | Cloontuskert | Roscommon |
| Ballyconboy | 879 | Castlereagh | Kilcorkey | Castlereagh |
| Ballycreggan | 344 | Athlone | Kiltoom | Athlone |
| Ballyculleen | 175 | Boyle | Killukin | Carrick on Shannon |
| Ballycummin | 124 | Ballintober North | Kilmore | Carrick on Shannon |
| Ballydaly | 268 | Roscommon | Killukin | Strokestown |
| Ballydangan | 53 | Moycarn | Moore | Ballinasloe |
| Ballydooley | 415 | Ballymoe | Oran | Roscommon |
| Ballyduffy | 223 | Roscommon | Lissonuffy | Strokestown |
| **Ballyfarnan** | Town | Boyle | Kilronan | Boyle |
| Ballyfeeny | 117 | Roscommon | Bumlin | Strokestown |
| Ballyfeeny | 654 | Ballintober North | Kilglass | Strokestown |
| Ballyfinegan | 438 | Castlereagh | Ballintober | Castlereagh |
| Ballyforan | 477 | Athlone | Taghboy | Athlone |
| Ballyformoyle | 727 | Boyle | Ardcarn | Boyle |
| Ballygalda (or Trust) | 596 | Ballintober South | Roscommon | Roscommon |
| Ballygate | 38 | Ballintober North | Termonbarry | Strokestown |
| Ballygatta and Corraree | 525 | Athlone | Taghmaconnell | Athlone |
| Ballyglass | 270 | Athlone | Dysart | Athlone |
| Ballyglass | 2,000 | Castlereagh | Baslick | Castlereagh |
| Ballyglass | 294 | Ballintober South | Cloontuskert | Roscommon |
| Ballyglass | 77 | Athlone | Killinvoy | Roscommon |
| Ballyglass | 300 | Athlone | Rahara | Roscommon |
| Ballyglass | 495 | Roscommon | Killukin | Strokestown |
| Ballyglass (Dodwell) | 298 | Athlone | Dysart | Athlone |
| Ballyglass East | 403 | Frenchpark | Tibohine | Castlereagh |
| Ballyglass Lower | 177 | Ballymoe | Cloonygormican | Roscommon |
| Ballyglass Upper | 545 | Ballymoe | Cloonygormican | Roscommon |
| Ballyglass West | 283 | Frenchpark | Tibohine | Castlereagh |
| Ballygortagh | 113 | Moycarn | Creagh | Ballinasloe |
| Ballyhammon | 127 | Roscommon | Lissonuffy | Strokestown |
| Ballyhollaghan | 67 | Frenchpark | Creeve | Carrick on Shannon |
| Ballyhubert | 327 | Roscommon | Lissonuffy | Strokestown |
| Ballyhugh | 31 | Moycarn | Creagh | Ballinasloe |
| Ballykeevican | 35 | Boyle | Kilbryan | Boyle |
| Ballykilcline | 610 | Ballintober North | Kilglass | Strokestown |
| Ballyleague | 374 | Ballintober South | Cloontuskert | Roscommon |
| Ballylion | 342 | Athlone | Cam | Athlone |
| Ballylugnagon | 269 | Boyle | Boyle | Boyle |
| Ballymacfarrane | 481 | Ballymoe | Dunamon | Roscommon |
| Ballymacurly North | 193 | Ballymoe | Cloonygormican | Roscommon |
| Ballymacurly South | 697 | Ballymoe | Cloonygormican | Roscommon |
| Ballymaglancy | 195 | Ballymoe | Cloonygormican | Castlereagh |
| Ballymagrine | 222 | Ballintober North | Termonbarry | Strokestown |
| Ballymartin | 257 | Ballintober North | Kilglass | Strokestown |
| Ballymartin Beg | 113 | Ballintober South | Roscommon | Roscommon |
| Ballymartin More | 249 | Ballintober South | Roscommon | Roscommon |
| Ballymintan | 104 | Athlone | Dysart | Athlone |
| Ballymore East (or Corbally) | 395 | Boyle | Boyle | Boyle |
| Ballymore West | 427 | Boyle | Boyle | Boyle |
| Ballymoylin | 265 | Ballintober North | Kilglass | Strokestown |
| Ballymullavil | 202 | Athlone | Kiltoom | Athlone |
| Ballymulrennan | 102 | Castlereagh | Kilkeevin | Castlereagh |
| Ballymurray | 322 | Athlone | Kilmeane | Roscommon |
| Ballymurray | 291 | Roscommon | Elphin | Strokestown |
| Ballynacullia | 124 | Ballintober South | Roscommon | Roscommon |
| Ballynaheglish | 89 | Ballymoe | Cloonygormican | Castlereagh |
| Ballynahoogh (or Cavetown) | 319 | Boyle | Estersnow | Boyle |
| Ballynahowna | 286 | Castlereagh | Kilcorkey | Castlereagh |
| Ballynanultagh | 196 | Boyle | Boyle | Boyle |
| Ballypheasan | 199 | Ballintober South | Roscommon | Roscommon |
| Ballyrevagh and Porteen | 305 | Athlone | Dysart | Athlone |
| Ballyrevagh West and Porteen | 363 | Athlone | Dysart | Athlone |
| Ballyroddy | 634 | Roscommon | Shankill | Boyle |
| Ballysundrivan | 357 | Frenchpark | Creeve | Carrick on Shannon |
| Ballytoohey | 878 | Ballintober North | Termonbarry | Strokestown |
| Ballytrasna | 251 | Boyle | Boyle | Boyle |
| Banada | 580 | Frenchpark | Kilcolman | Castlereagh |
| Barcullin | 111 | Boyle | Ardcarn | Boyle |
| Barnaboy | 191 | Frenchpark | Kilnamanagh | Castlereagh |
| Barnacawley | 836 | Frenchpark | Tibohine | Castlereagh |
| Barnacullen | 397 | Athlone | Rahara | Roscommon |
| Barnhill | 180 | Ballintober South | Roscommon | Roscommon |
| Barravally | 112 | Ballintober North | Kilglass | Strokestown |
| Barrinagh | 268 | Castlereagh | Kiltullagh | Castlereagh |
| Barrinagh | 116 | Roscommon | Shankill | Strokestown |
| Barry Beg | 768 | Athlone | Kiltoom | Athlone |
| Barry More | 1,140 | Athlone | Kiltoom | Athlone |
| Baslick | 129 | Castlereagh | Baslick | Castlereagh |
| **Battlebridge** | Town | Boyle | Tumna | Carrick on Shannon |
| Beagh | 413 | Castlereagh | Kilkeevin | Castlereagh |
| Beagh (Brabazon) | 446 | Moycarn | Creagh | Ballinasloe |
| Beagh (Naghten) | 33 | Moycarn | Creagh | Ballinasloe |
| Beagh (Trench) | 121 | Moycarn | Creagh | Ballinasloe |
| Beaghbeg | 101 | Moycarn | Creagh | Ballinasloe |
| Bealragh | 398 | Roscommon | Aughrim | Carrick on Shannon |
| Behy | 196 | Boyle | Ardcarn | Boyle |
| Behy | 210 | Boyle | Boyle | Boyle |
| Belderg | 21 | Ballintober South | Kilteevan | Roscommon |
| Bella | 280 | Frenchpark | Kilcolagh | Boyle |
| Bellacagher | 485 | Ballymoe | Drumatemple | Castlereagh |
| Bellagill | 197 | Moycarn | Creagh | Ballinasloe |
| Bellanacarrow | 120 | Athlone | Fuerty | Roscommon |
| **Bellanagare** | Town | Castlereagh | Kilcorkey | Castlereagh |
| Bellanagare | 316 | Castlereagh | Kilcorkey | Castlereagh |
| Bellanamullia | 421 | Athlone | St. Peter's | Athlone |
| Bellanamullia | 104 | Roscommon | Bumlin | Strokestown |
| Bellaneeny | 140 | Athlone | Taghmaconnell | Athlone |
| **Bellaugh** | Town | Athlone | St. Peter's | Athlone |
| Bellaugh | 354 | Athlone | St. Peter's | Athlone |
| Bellmount (or Cloggernagh) | 50 | Roscommon | Lissonuffy | Strokestown |
| Bellspark | 21 | Boyle | Boyle | Boyle |
| Belrea | 277 | Athlone | Drum | Athlone |
| Benmore | 217 | Castlereagh | Kiltullagh | Castlereagh |
| Betal | 159 | Castlereagh | Kiltullagh | Castlereagh |
| Bigmeadow and Athlone | 111 | Athlone | St. Peter's | Athlone |
| Binmuck | 222 | Athlone | St. Johns | Athlone |
| Blackfallow | 87 | Boyle | Ardcarn | Boyle |
| Bloomfield | 113 | Roscommon | Kilcooley | Strokestown |
| Bodorragha | 142 | Boyle | Kilbryan | Boyle |
| Bodorragha | 203 | Boyle | Kilronan | Boyle |
| **Bogganfin** | Town | Athlone | St. Peter's | Athlone |
| Bogganfin | 291 | Athlone | Kiltoom | Athlone |
| Bogganfin | 105 | Athlone | St. Peter's | Athlone |
| Bogganfin | 163 | Athlone | Kilmeane | Roscommon |
| Bogwood (or Carrowntogher) | 200 | Ballintober South | Kilgefin | Roscommon |
| Bohagh | 533 | Castlereagh | Ballintober | Castlereagh |
| Bohergarve | 152 | Ballintober South | Roscommon | Roscommon |
| Boherroe | 35 | Frenchpark | Creeve | Carrick on Shannon |
| Bolarry | 68 | Boyle | Kilronan | Boyle |
| Boleyduff | 119 | Athlone | Taghmaconnell | Athlone |
| Bolinree | 122 | Athlone | Kilmeane | Roscommon |
| Boyanagh | 161 | Roscommon | Aughrim | Carrick on Shannon |
| Boyanagh | 96 | Roscommon | Elphin | Strokestown |
| **Boyle** | Town | Boyle | Boyle | Boyle |
| Brackloon | 542 | Roscommon | Shankill | Boyle |
| Brackloon | 32 | Boyle | Tumna | Boyle |
| Brackloon | 336 | Castlereagh | Ballintober | Castlereagh |
| Brackloon | 553 | Castlereagh | Kilcorkey | Castlereagh |
| Brackloon | 447 | Athlone | Fuerty | Roscommon |
| Breanabeg | 313 | Castlereagh | Kilkeevin | Castlereagh |
| Breanamore | 580 | Frenchpark | Tibohine | Castlereagh |
| Breandrum | 161 | Boyle | Boyle | Boyle |
| Breanletter | 606 | Boyle | Ardcarn | Boyle |
| Bredagh | 380 | Athlone | Dysart | Athlone |
| Bredagh | 291 | Athlone | Kiltoom | Athlone |
| Breeole | 290 | Athlone | Dysart | Athlone |
| Breeole West | 73 | Athlone | Dysart | Athlone |
| Brideswell | 263 | Athlone | Cam | Athlone |
| Bridgecartron (or Derrycashel) | 362 | Boyle | Ardcarn | Boyle |
| Brierfield | 288 | Ballymoe | Cloonygormican | Castlereagh |
| Brislagh | 490 | Boyle | Boyle | Boyle |
| Bryan Beg | 42 | Roscommon | Aughrim | Carrick on Shannon |
| Bryan More | 84 | Roscommon | Aughrim | Carrick on Shannon |
| Buckill | 827 | Frenchpark | Tibohine | Castlereagh |
| Bullock Island | 11 | Boyle | Ardcarn | Boyle |
| Bumlin | 257 | Roscommon | Bumlin | Strokestown |
| Bunnageddy | 176 | Roscommon | Lissonuffy | Strokestown |
| Bunnamucka | 221 | Roscommon | Killukin | Strokestown |
| Bunnaribba | 121 | Athlone | St. Peter's | Athlone |
| Bunreagh | 263 | Boyle | Killummod | Boyle |
| Bushfield | 388 | Ballymoe | Cloonygormican | Castlereagh |
| Caddellbrook | 216 | Castlereagh | Baslick | Castlereagh |
| Caher | 350 | Castlereagh | Kilkeevin | Castlereagh |
| Caher | 188 | Frenchpark | Tibohine | Castlereagh |
| Caldragh | 212 | Frenchpark | Kilmacumsy | Boyle |
| Caldragh | 198 | Roscommon | Kiltrustan | Strokestown |
| Caldrymoran | 131 | Roscommon | Shankill | Strokestown |
| Callow (or Runnawillin) | 632 | Frenchpark | Kilnamanagh | Castlereagh |
| Callowbeg | 282 | Athlone | Drum | Athlone |
| Caltragh | 54 | Ballintober South | Cloontuskert | Roscommon |
| Caltragh | 132 | Athlone | Rahara | Roscommon |
| Caltraghbeg | 74 | Athlone | Cam | Athlone |
| Cam | 1,009 | Athlone | Cam | Athlone |
| Camcloon | 194 | Moycarn | Moore | Ballinasloe |
| Camlagh | 620 | Athlone | Taghmaconnell | Ballinasloe |
| Camlin | 274 | Boyle | Estersnow | Boyle |
| Cammoge | 535 | Roscommon | Elphin | Strokestown |
| Cams | 818 | Athlone | Fuerty | Roscommon |
| Canal and Banks | 28 | Athlone | St. Peter's | Athlone |
| Canbo | 315 | Boyle | Killummod | Carrick on Shannon |
| Candlefield | 140 | Castlereagh | Kiltullagh | Castlereagh |
| Cappagh | 47 | Frenchpark | Castlemore | Castlereagh |
| Cappagh | 153 | Ballintober South | Kilgefin | Roscommon |
| Cappagh | 65 | Roscommon | Kilbride | Strokestown |
| Cappaleitrim | 524 | Moycarn | Moore | Ballinasloe |
| Cappalisheen | 226 | Athlone | Kiltoom | Athlone |
| Cappantogher | 268 | Moycarn | Moore | Ballinasloe |
| Cappayuse | 324 | Moycarn | Moore | Ballinasloe |
| Caran | 100 | Frenchpark | Kilmacumsy | Boyle |
| Caran | 312 | Ballymoe | Cloonygormican | Castlereagh |
| Caran | 334 | Ballymoe | Drumatemple | Castlereagh |
| Caran Bog | 39 | Ballymoe | Cloonygormican | Castlereagh |
| Caranlea | 92 | Frenchpark | Kilmacumsy | Boyle |
| Cargin Demesne | 394 | Roscommon | Ogulla | Strokestown |
| Carkfree | 191 | Boyle | Estersnow | Boyle |
| Carnagh East | 864 | Athlone | St. Johns | Athlone |
| Carnagh West | 459 | Athlone | St. Johns | Athlone |
| Carnakit | 410 | Castlereagh | Baslick | Castlereagh |
| Carns | 391 | Roscommon | Ogulla | Strokestown |
| Carradooan | 106 | Castlereagh | Kilkeevin | Castlereagh |
| Carraghs East | 454 | Castlereagh | Kiltullagh | Castlereagh |
| Carraghs West | 321 | Castlereagh | Kiltullagh | Castlereagh |
| Carrick | 610 | Athlone | Cam | Athlone |
| Carrick | 219 | Athlone | Kiltoom | Athlone |
| Carrick | 424 | Castlereagh | Kiltullagh | Castlereagh |
| **Carrick on Shannon(Part)** | Town | Boyle | Killukin | Carrick on Shannon |
| Carrickadraan | 113 | Boyle | Kilronan | Boyle |
| Carrickbeg | 173 | Athlone | Cam | Athlone |
| Carrickbeg | 85 | Athlone | Tisrara | Roscommon |
| Carrickilla | 85 | Roscommon | Aughrim | Carrick on Shannon |
| Carricklom | 82 | Roscommon | Aughrim | Carrick on Shannon |
| Carrickmore | 431 | Boyle | Boyle | Boyle |
| Carricknagat | 134 | Athlone | Tisrara | Roscommon |
| Carricknashee | 33 | Boyle | Kilronan | Boyle |
| Carrickynaghtan | 293 | Athlone | Drum | Athlone |
| Carrickynaghtan and Garrynagawna Bog | 973 | Athlone | Drum | Athlone |
| Carrigan Beg | 131 | Athlone | St. Johns | Athlone |
| Carrigan More | 461 | Athlone | St. Johns | Athlone |
| Carrigans Park | 248 | Ballymoe | Dunamon | Roscommon |
| Carrigeen | 193 | Frenchpark | Kilcolagh | Boyle |
| Carrigeen | 184 | Roscommon | Shankill | Boyle |
| Carrigeen | 74 | Boyle | Tumna | Carrick on Shannon |
| Carrigeen | 430 | Ballintober North | Kilglass | Strokestown |
| Carrigeenacreeha | 207 | Frenchpark | Kilcolagh | Boyle |
| Carrigeenagappul | 79 | Frenchpark | Kilcolagh | Boyle |
| Carrigeenagappul | 325 | Roscommon | Kilcooley | Strokestown |
| Carrigeenagowna | 196 | Boyle | Boyle | Boyle |
| Carrigeencarragh | 264 | Boyle | Estersnow | Boyle |
| Carrigeenduff | 81 | Roscommon | Aughrim | Carrick on Shannon |
| Carrigeens | 174 | Athlone | Kilmeane | Roscommon |
| Carrigeenynaghtan | 382 | Frenchpark | Kilcolagh | Boyle |
| Carroward | 101 | Boyle | Killukin | Carrick on Shannon |
| Carroward | 209 | Ballintober South | Kilbride | Roscommon |
| Carroward | 90 | Ballintober South | Kilgefin | Roscommon |
| Carroward | 292 | Athlone | Tisrara | Roscommon |
| Carroward | 221 | Roscommon | Lissonuffy | Strokestown |
| Carrowbane | 95 | Frenchpark | Tibohine | Castlereagh |
| Carrowbaun | 130 | Boyle | Kilronan | Boyle |
| Carrowbaun | 239 | Castlereagh | Ballintober | Castlereagh |
| Carrowbaun | 128 | Castlereagh | Baslick | Castlereagh |
| Carrowbaun | 376 | Ballymoe | Cloonygormican | Castlereagh |
| Carrowbaun | 140 | Ballintober South | Kilbride | Roscommon |
| Carrowbeg | 82 | Boyle | Kilronan | Boyle |
| Carrowbehy | 838 | Frenchpark | Tibohine | Castlereagh |
| Carrowboy | 93 | Ballintober South | Kilbride | Roscommon |
| Carrowclogher | 251 | Roscommon | Cloonfinlough | Strokestown |
| Carrowcrin | 29 | Frenchpark | Kilmacumsy | Boyle |
| Carrowcrin | 274 | Ballintober South | Kilbride | Roscommon |
| Carrowcuill | 184 | Ballintober North | Kilmore | Carrick on Shannon |
| Carrowduff & Garbally | 924 | Athlone | Taghmaconnell | Athlone |
| Carrowduff Lower | 333 | Ballymoe | Cloonygormican | Castlereagh |
| Carrowduff Upper | 192 | Ballymoe | Cloonygormican | Castlereagh |
| Carroweighter | 216 | Ballymoe | Oran | Roscommon |
| Carrowgarve | 156 | Castlereagh | Kilkeevin | Castlereagh |
| Carrowgarve | 536 | Frenchpark | Tibohine | Castlereagh |
| Carrowgarve | 200 | Ballymoe | Oran | Roscommon |
| Carrowgarve | 474 | Roscommon | Ogulla | Strokestown |
| Carrowgobbadagh | 94 | Roscommon | Elphin | Strokestown |
| Carrowkeel | 242 | Athlone | Taghboy | Athlone |
| Carrowkeel | 135 | Boyle | Estersnow | Boyle |
| Carrowkeel | 23 | Frenchpark | Kilmacumsy | Boyle |
| Carrowkeel | 138 | Frenchpark | Kilnamanagh | Boyle |
| Carrowkeel | 154 | Castlereagh | Baslick | Castlereagh |
| Carrowkeel | 173 | Castlereagh | Kilkeevin | Castlereagh |
| Carrowkeel | 285 | Athlone | Fuerty | Roscommon |
| Carrowkeel | 38 | Ballintober South | Kilbride | Roscommon |
| Carrowkeel | 156 | Athlone | Rahara | Roscommon |
| Carrowkeel | 122 | Roscommon | Clooncraff | Strokestown |
| Carrowkeel | 78 | Roscommon | Ogulla | Strokestown |
| Carrowkeel Upper | 125 | Roscommon | Clooncraff | Strokestown |
| Carrowkeeny | 348 | Athlone | Kiltoom | Athlone |
| Carrowkeeran | 303 | Athlone | Taghmaconnell | Athlone |
| Carrowmoneen | 135 | Frenchpark | Kilcolagh | Boyle |
| Carrowmoneen | 185 | Ballintober South | Kilgefin | Roscommon |
| Carrowmoney | 421 | Athlone | Rahara | Roscommon |
| Carrowmore | 195 | Athlone | Taghboy | Athlone |
| Carrowmore | 212 | Boyle | Ardcarn | Boyle |
| Carrowmore | 179 | Boyle | Kilbryan | Boyle |
| Carrowmore | 25 | Boyle | Kilronan | Boyle |
| Carrowmore | 456 | Boyle | Killummod | Carrick on Shannon |
| Carrowmore | 127 | Ballintober North | Kilmore | Carrick on Shannon |
| Carrowmore | 166 | Castlereagh | Kilkeevin | Castlereagh |
| Carrowmore | 583 | Ballintober South | Roscommon | Roscommon |
| Carrowmurragh | 791 | Athlone | Kiltoom | Athlone |
| Carrownabrickna | 605 | Ballintober South | Roscommon | Roscommon |
| Carrownadurly | 274 | Athlone | Taghboy | Athlone |
| Carrownagappul | 217 | Boyle | Estersnow | Boyle |
| Carrownagashel | 178 | Boyle | Ardcarn | Boyle |
| Carrownageelaun | 185 | Roscommon | Ogulla | Strokestown |
| Carrownageeloge | 185 | Ballymoe | Oran | Roscommon |
| Carrownageeragh | 295 | Boyle | Boyle | Boyle |
| Carrownaglearagh | 516 | Roscommon | Aughrim | Carrick on Shannon |
| Carrownagullagh | 170 | Roscommon | Kiltrustan | Strokestown |
| Carrownaknockaun | 266 | Frenchpark | Tibohine | Castlereagh |
| Carrownalassan | 1,241 | Ballintober South | Kilbride | Roscommon |
| Carrownamaddy | 427 | Athlone | St. Johns | Athlone |
| Carrownamaddy | 421 | Roscommon | Creeve | Strokestown |
| Carrownamorheeny | 139 | Roscommon | Shankill | Strokestown |
| Carrownanalt | 216 | Boyle | Kilronan | Boyle |
| Carrownaskeagh | 190 | Roscommon | Cloonfinlough | Strokestown |
| Carrownaskeagh | 182 | Roscommon | Ogulla | Strokestown |
| Carrowncaran | 96 | Frenchpark | Kilmacumsy | Boyle |
| Carrowncloghan | 207 | Athlone | Kiltoom | Athlone |
| Carrowncully | 184 | Frenchpark | Kilmacumsy | Boyle |
| Carrowndangan | 323 | Ballymoe | Cloonygormican | Castlereagh |
| Carrownderry | 554 | Athlone | Kiltoom | Athlone |
| Carrowndrisha | 458 | Athlone | Killinvoy | Roscommon |
| Carrowngarry | 77 | Frenchpark | Kilmacumsy | Boyle |
| Carrownolan | 277 | Athlone | Kiltoom | Athlone |
| Carrownrinny | 70 | Roscommon | Kilcooley | Strokestown |
| Carrownrinny | 70 | Roscommon | Killukin | Strokestown |
| Carrownskeheen | 207 | Ballintober North | Kilglass | Strokestown |
| Carrowntarriff | 454 | Athlone | Taghboy | Athlone |
| Carrowntemple | 128 | Athlone | Tisrara | Roscommon |
| Carrowntlieve | 405 | Athlone | Tisrara | Roscommon |
| Carrowntogher | 113 | Frenchpark | Kilmacumsy | Boyle |
| Carrowntogher (or Bogwood) | 200 | Ballintober South | Kilgefin | Roscommon |
| Carrowntoosan | 111 | Roscommon | Ogulla | Strokestown |
| Carrowntornan | 144 | Ballintober South | Kilbride | Roscommon |
| Carrowntryla | 132 | Roscommon | Cloonfinlough | Strokestown |
| Carrownure | 53 | Athlone | Kiltoom | Athlone |
| Carrownure | 129 | Athlone | Taghmaconnell | Ballinasloe |
| Carrownure Lower | 180 | Athlone | St. Johns | Athlone |
| Carrownure Upper | 162 | Athlone | St. Johns | Athlone |
| Carrownurlar | 102 | Frenchpark | Kilnamanagh | Castlereagh |
| Carrownurlar | 86 | Athlone | Taghboy | Roscommon |
| Carrownurlar | 356 | Roscommon | Elphin | Strokestown |
| Carrownvally | 137 | Roscommon | Killukin | Strokestown |
| Carrowphadeen | 544 | Athlone | St. Johns | Athlone |
| Carrowreagh | 682 | Athlone | Taghmaconnell | Ballinasloe |
| Carrowreagh | 655 | Roscommon | Aughrim | Carrick on Shannon |
| Carrowreagh | 385 | Boyle | Killummod | Carrick on Shannon |
| Carrowreagh | 235 | Castlereagh | Ballintober | Castlereagh |
| Carrowreagh | 675 | Castlereagh | Kilcorkey | Castlereagh |
| Carrowreagh | 385 | Frenchpark | Kilnamanagh | Castlereagh |
| Carrowreagh | 237 | Castlereagh | Kiltullagh | Castlereagh |
| Carrowreagh | 464 | Athlone | Athleague | Roscommon |
| Carrowreagh (or Keelcurragh) | 53 | Ballintober South | Kilgefin | Roscommon |
| Carrowroe | 496 | Ballintober South | Roscommon | Roscommon |
| Carrowstellan | 149 | Athlone | Fuerty | Roscommon |
| Cartron | 190 | Athlone | Kiltoom | Athlone |
| Cartron | 163 | Athlone | St. Peter's | Athlone |
| Cartron | 109 | Boyle | Ardcarn | Boyle |
| Cartron | 117 | Frenchpark | Creeve | Carrick on Shannon |
| Cartron | 277 | Boyle | Killummod | Carrick on Shannon |
| Cartron | 58 | Ballymoe | Drumatemple | Castlereagh |
| Cartron | 70 | Ballymoe | Cloonygormican | Roscommon |
| Cartron | 78 | Ballintober South | Kilbride | Roscommon |
| Cartron | 61 | Ballintober South | Kilgefin | Roscommon |
| Cartron | 46 | Athlone | Killinvoy | Roscommon |
| Cartron | 201 | Athlone | Tisrara | Roscommon |
| Cartron | 286 | Roscommon | Elphin | Strokestown |
| Cartron | 65 | Roscommon | Kilcooley | Strokestown |
| Cartron (Brett) | 70 | Ballintober South | Roscommon | Roscommon |
| Cartron (Coote) | 119 | Ballintober South | Roscommon | Roscommon |
| Cartron (Hartland) | 228 | Ballintober North | Kilmore | Carrick on Shannon |
| Cartron (King) | 113 | Ballintober North | Kilmore | Carrick on Shannon |
| Cartron (or Old Glebe) | 54 | Ballintober South | Kilgefin | Roscommon |
| Cartron Beg | 117 | Frenchpark | Tibohine | Castlereagh |
| Cartron More | 392 | Frenchpark | Tibohine | Castlereagh |
| Cartronaglogh | 143 | Boyle | Kilronan | Boyle |
| Cartronagor | 146 | Roscommon | Shankill | Strokestown |
| Cartronavally | 197 | Boyle | Kilronan | Boyle |
| Cartroncaran | 26 | Frenchpark | Kilmacumsy | Boyle |
| Cartroncarrowntogher | 152 | Frenchpark | Kilmacumsy | Boyle |
| Cartronkilly | 194 | Athlone | Dysart | Athlone |
| Cartronperagh | 32 | Athlone | Killinvoy | Roscommon |
| Cashel | 196 | Boyle | Kilronan | Boyle |
| Cashel | 86 | Castlereagh | Kilcorkey | Castlereagh |
| Cashel | 136 | Castlereagh | Kiltullagh | Castlereagh |
| Cashelfinoge (or Lugnamuddagh) | 211 | Boyle | Boyle | Boyle |
| Cashelmeehan | 794 | Ballintober South | Kilbride | Roscommon |
| Cashelnagole | 150 | Castlereagh | Kilcorkey | Castlereagh |
| Casheltauna | 335 | Ballintober South | Kilbride | Roscommon |
| Cashlieve | 281 | Castlereagh | Kiltullagh | Castlereagh |
| Castlecoote | 524 | Athlone | Fuerty | Roscommon |
| Castleland | 265 | Roscommon | Ogulla | Strokestown |
| Castlenode | 220 | Roscommon | Bumlin | Strokestown |
| **Castleplunket** | Town | Castlereagh | Baslick | Castlereagh |
| Castleplunket | 393 | Castlereagh | Baslick | Castlereagh |
| Castlequarter | 262 | Castlereagh | Kiltullagh | Castlereagh |
| Castlerange | 802 | Athlone | Fuerty | Roscommon |
| **Castlereagh** | Town | Castlereagh | Kilkeevin | Castlereagh |
| Castlereagh | 148 | Castlereagh | Kilkeevin | Castlereagh |
| Castleruby | 271 | Castlereagh | Baslick | Castlereagh |
| Castlesampson | 1,560 | Athlone | Taghmaconnell | Athlone |
| Castleteheen | 575 | Castlereagh | Baslick | Castlereagh |
| Castletension Demesne | 600 | Boyle | Kilronan | Boyle |
| Castletown | 70 | Frenchpark | Creeve | Carrick on Shannon |
| Caul | 579 | Ballintober North | Kilglass | Strokestown |
| Cavetown (or Ballynahoogh) | 319 | Boyle | Estersnow | Boyle |
| Chanterland (or Windmillpark) | 103 | Roscommon | Elphin | Strokestown |
| Charlestown | 167 | Ballintober North | Kilmore | Carrick on Shannon |
| Cherryfield (or Drishaghan) | 174 | Roscommon | Shankill | Strokestown |
| Church Hill | 114 | Boyle | Ardcarn | Carrick on Shannon |
| Church Island | 4 | Boyle | Boyle | Boyle |
| Churchacres | 70 | Boyle | Kilronan | Boyle |
| Churchquarter | 99 | Castlereagh | Kiltullagh | Castlereagh |
| Clarary | 181 | Moycarn | Creagh | Ballinasloe |
| Clare | 197 | Roscommon | Cloonfinlough | Strokestown |
| Clashaganny | 59 | Roscommon | Killukin | Strokestown |
| Clashcarragh | 97 | Frenchpark | Tibohine | Castlereagh |
| Cleaboy | 257 | Castlereagh | Ballintober | Castlereagh |
| Cleaghbeg | 37 | Moycarn | Creagh | Ballinasloe |
| Cleaghgarve | 57 | Moycarn | Creagh | Ballinasloe |
| Cleaheen | 681 | Boyle | Tumna | Carrick on Shannon |
| Cleen | 426 | Boyle | Ardcarn | Boyle |
| Cleenraugh | 207 | Frenchpark | Kilmacumsy | Boyle |
| Clegna | 326 | Boyle | Ardcarn | Carrick on Shannon |
| Clerragh | 306 | Boyle | Ardcarn | Boyle |
| Clerragh | 259 | Frenchpark | Tibohine | Castlereagh |
| Cloggaltonroe | 119 | Roscommon | Lissonuffy | Strokestown |
| Cloggarnagh | 407 | Frenchpark | Tibohine | Castlereagh |
| Cloggernagh (or Bellmount) | 50 | Roscommon | Lissonuffy | Strokestown |
| Cloghan | 376 | Athlone | Taghboy | Athlone |
| Cloghans Glebe | 89 | Athlone | Kiltoom | Athlone |
| Clogher | 275 | Boyle | Estersnow | Boyle |
| Clogher | 182 | Ballintober North | Kilmore | Carrick on Shannon |
| Clogher | 135 | Ballymoe | Cloonygormican | Roscommon |
| Clogher Beg | 205 | Roscommon | Elphin | Strokestown |
| Clogher Lower | 244 | Castlereagh | Kiltullagh | Castlereagh |
| Clogher More | 320 | Roscommon | Elphin | Strokestown |
| Clogher Upper | 452 | Castlereagh | Kiltullagh | Castlereagh |
| Cloghnashade | 249 | Athlone | Tisrara | Roscommon |
| Cloomeigh | 230 | Roscommon | Kilcooley | Strokestown |
| Cloonacaltry | 402 | Athlone | Taghmaconnell | Athlone |
| Cloonacarrow | 230 | Frenchpark | Kilnamanagh | Boyle |
| Cloonacarrow | 109 | Boyle | Tumna | Boyle |
| Cloonacolly | 700 | Frenchpark | Tibohine | Castlereagh |
| Cloonadarragh East | 104 | Ballymoe | Drumatemple | Glennamaddy |
| Cloonaddra | 613 | Ballintober South | Cloontuskert | Roscommon |
| Cloonaddron | 732 | Athlone | Taghmaconnell | Ballinasloe |
| Cloonaff | 345 | Castlereagh | Kilkeevin | Castlereagh |
| Cloonageeragh | 560 | Ballintober South | Kilgefin | Roscommon |
| Cloonagh | 360 | Athlone | Taghboy | Athlone |
| Cloonagh | 488 | Frenchpark | Tibohine | Castlereagh |
| Cloonaghbaun | 62 | Boyle | Ardcarn | Boyle |
| Cloonaghbrack | 80 | Moycarn | Creagh | Ballinasloe |
| Cloonagrassan | 351 | Ballymoe | Drumatemple | Castlereagh |
| Cloonahee | 317 | Roscommon | Clooncraff | Strokestown |
| Cloonakille | 274 | Athlone | St. Peter's | Athlone |
| Cloonakilleg | 609 | Athlone | Tisrara | Roscommon |
| Cloonakilly | 135 | Roscommon | Killukin | Strokestown |
| Cloonakilly Beg | 135 | Roscommon | Killukin | Strokestown |
| Cloonakilly More | 206 | Roscommon | Killukin | Strokestown |
| Cloonalis | 214 | Castlereagh | Kilkeevin | Castlereagh |
| Cloonalough | 741 | Castlereagh | Kiltullagh | Castlereagh |
| Cloonamuinia | 201 | Ballymoe | Dunamon | Roscommon |
| Cloonanart Beg | 93 | Roscommon | Kilcooley | Strokestown |
| Cloonanart More | 122 | Roscommon | Kilcooley | Strokestown |
| Cloonard | 355 | Frenchpark | Tibohine | Castlereagh |
| Cloonargid | 563 | Frenchpark | Tibohine | Castlereagh |
| Cloonark | 871 | Athlone | Drum | Athlone |
| Cloonarragh | 496 | Frenchpark | Tibohine | Castlereagh |
| Cloonarragh | 508 | Ballintober South | Kilbride | Roscommon |
| Cloonastiallas | 245 | Roscommon | Killukin | Strokestown |
| Cloonaufill | 221 | Ballintober North | Termonbarry | Strokestown |
| Cloonaufill Island | 2 | Ballintober North | Termonbarry | Strokestown |
| Cloonavery | 143 | Ballintober North | Kilmore | Carrick on Shannon |
| Cloonavindin | 232 | Castlereagh | Kilkeevin | Castlereagh |
| Cloonbard | 659 | Castlereagh | Baslick | Castlereagh |
| Cloonbeggaun | 916 | Moycarn | Moore | Ballinasloe |
| Cloonbigny | 368 | Athlone | Taghmaconnell | Ballinasloe |
| Cloonboley | 440 | Athlone | Drum | Athlone |
| Cloonbonniff | 234 | Castlereagh | Kilkeevin | Castlereagh |
| Cloonbony | 472 | Ballintober South | Kilbride | Roscommon |
| Cloonboyoge | 79 | Roscommon | Shankill | Strokestown |
| Cloonbrackna | 94 | Ballintober South | Roscommon | Roscommon |
| Cloonbunny | 631 | Frenchpark | Tibohine | Castlereagh |
| Cloonburren | 897 | Moycarn | Moore | Ballinasloe |
| Cloonca | 462 | Athlone | Tisrara | Roscommon |
| Clooncah | 109 | Castlereagh | Kilkeevin | Castlereagh |
| Clooncah | 270 | Frenchpark | Tibohine | Castlereagh |
| Clooncah | 566 | Roscommon | Cloonfinlough | Roscommon |
| Clooncah | 338 | Ballintober South | Kilteevan | Roscommon |
| Clooncalgy | 86 | Castlereagh | Kiltullagh | Castlereagh |
| Clooncalgy Beg | 123 | Castlereagh | Kiltullagh | Castlereagh |
| Clooncalgy More | 419 | Castlereagh | Kiltullagh | Castlereagh |
| Clooncan | 1,203 | Castlereagh | Kilkeevin | Castlereagh |
| Clooncashel Beg | 346 | Ballintober South | Kilgefin | Roscommon |
| Clooncashel More | 276 | Ballintober South | Kilgefin | Roscommon |
| Cloonchambers | 733 | Castlereagh | Kilkeevin | Castlereagh |
| Clooncommon Beg | 116 | Ballintober North | Kilmore | Carrick on Shannon |
| Clooncommon More | 330 | Ballintober North | Kilmore | Carrick on Shannon |
| Cloonconny | 92 | Roscommon | Kilbride | Strokestown |
| Cloonconra | 743 | Castlereagh | Kilkeevin | Castlereagh |
| Cloonconra | 221 | Ballintober South | Kilteevan | Roscommon |
| Clooncoose | 171 | Ballintober North | Kilmore | Carrick on Shannon |
| Clooncoose | 86 | Boyle | Tumna | Carrick on Shannon |
| Clooncoose North | 771 | Castlereagh | Kilkeevin | Castlereagh |
| Clooncoose South | 118 | Castlereagh | Kilkeevin | Castlereagh |
| Clooncor | 174 | Roscommon | Kilcooley | Strokestown |
| Clooncoran | 540 | Athlone | Taghmaconnell | Ballinasloe |
| Clooncosker | 165 | Roscommon | Clooncraff | Strokestown |
| Clooncraff | 797 | Ballintober South | Kilteevan | Roscommon |
| Clooncraffield | 291 | Castlereagh | Kilkeevin | Castlereagh |
| Clooncraft | 327 | Roscommon | Clooncraff | Strokestown |
| Clooncran | 115 | Castlereagh | Kilkeevin | Castlereagh |
| Clooncrim | 825 | Castlereagh | Kiltullagh | Castlereagh |
| Clooncruffer | 140 | Boyle | Ardcarn | Boyle |
| Clooncullaan | 644 | Roscommon | Elphin | Strokestown |
| Clooncullaan | 162 | Roscommon | Kilcooley | Strokestown |
| Clooncunny | 394 | Roscommon | Elphin | Strokestown |
| Cloondacarra | 283 | Castlereagh | Kilkeevin | Castlereagh |
| Cloondacarra Beg | 254 | Castlereagh | Kilkeevin | Castlereagh |
| Cloondarah | 280 | Athlone | Tisrara | Roscommon |
| Cloondart | 194 | Frenchpark | Tibohine | Castlereagh |
| Cloonearagh | 339 | Roscommon | Cloonfinlough | Strokestown |
| Clooneen | 56 | Moycarn | Creagh | Ballinasloe |
| Clooneen | 217 | Frenchpark | Kilnamanagh | Boyle |
| Clooneen | 719 | Athlone | Athleague | Roscommon |
| Clooneen | 44 | Athlone | Rahara | Roscommon |
| Clooneen (Blakeny) | 261 | Ballintober North | Kilglass | Strokestown |
| Clooneen (Hartland) | 458 | Roscommon | Kilglass | Strokestown |
| Clooneenbaun | 1,577 | Athlone | Fuerty | Roscommon |
| **Clooneenbeg** | Town | Athlone | Athleague | Roscommon |
| Clooneigh | 85 | Boyle | Tumna | Carrick on Shannon |
| Clooneigh | 538 | Ballintober South | Kilteevan | Roscommon |
| Clooneigh | 230 | Roscommon | Kilcooley | Strokestown |
| Clooneish | 510 | Moycarn | Moore | Ballinasloe |
| Cloonelly | 82 | Roscommon | Kilbride | Strokestown |
| Cloonelt | 480 | Castlereagh | Kilkeevin | Castlereagh |
| Cloonerk | 180 | Ballintober South | Kilbride | Roscommon |
| Cloonerkaun | 408 | Castlereagh | Kiltullagh | Castlereagh |
| Cloonerkhaun | 408 | Castlereagh | Kiltullagh | Castlereagh |
| Cloonerra | 129 | Roscommon | Cloonfinlough | Strokestown |
| Clooneskert | 188 | Ballintober South | Kilteevan | Roscommon |
| Cloonfad | 681 | Moycarn | Moore | Ballinasloe |
| Cloonfad | 315 | Boyle | Tumna | Carrick on Shannon |
| Cloonfad | 388 | Castlereagh | Kilkeevin | Castlereagh |
| Cloonfad | 637 | Frenchpark | Tibohine | Castlereagh |
| Cloonfad | 550 | Ballintober North | Termonbarry | Strokestown |
| Cloonfad East | 1,090 | Castlereagh | Kiltullagh | Castlereagh |
| Cloonfad More | 370 | Roscommon | Aughrim | Carrick on Shannon |
| Cloonfad West | 354 | Castlereagh | Kiltullagh | Castlereagh |
| Cloonfadbeg | 161 | Roscommon | Aughrim | Carrick on Shannon |
| Cloonfelliv | 471 | Castlereagh | Kilkeevin | Castlereagh |
| Cloonfineen | 309 | Castlereagh | Kiltullagh | Castlereagh |
| Cloonfinglas | 809 | Frenchpark | Tibohine | Castlereagh |
| Cloonfinlough | 401 | Roscommon | Cloonfinlough | Strokestown |
| Cloonfower | 1,215 | Castlereagh | Kilkeevin | Castlereagh |
| Cloonfower | 255 | Ballintober North | Termonbarry | Strokestown |
| Cloonfree | 796 | Roscommon | Cloonfinlough | Strokestown |
| Cloongarvan | 99 | Roscommon | Clooncraff | Strokestown |
| Cloonglasny Beg | 335 | Roscommon | Clooncraff | Strokestown |
| Cloonglasny More | 163 | Roscommon | Clooncraff | Strokestown |
| Cloongowna | 665 | Athlone | Drum | Athlone |
| Cloongownagh | 235 | Boyle | Tumna | Carrick on Shannon |
| Cloongreaghan | 326 | Boyle | Ardcarn | Carrick on Shannon |
| Clooniff | 715 | Moycarn | Moore | Ballinasloe |
| Cloonillan | 465 | Athlone | Drum | Athlone |
| Clooninisclin | 550 | Castlereagh | Kiltullagh | Castlereagh |
| Clooniniselin | 550 | Castlereagh | Kiltullagh | Castlereagh |
| Cloonkeehan East | 156 | Castlereagh | Kiltullagh | Castlereagh |
| Cloonkeehan West | 164 | Castlereagh | Kiltullagh | Castlereagh |
| Cloonkeen | 364 | Athlone | Taghmaconnell | Ballinasloe |
| Cloonkeen | 132 | Boyle | Tumna | Carrick on Shannon |
| Cloonkeen | 1,181 | Castlereagh | Kilkeevin | Castlereagh |
| Cloonkerin | 528 | Frenchpark | Kilcolagh | Boyle |
| Cloonlarge | 330 | Ballintober South | Kilteevan | Roscommon |
| Cloonlatieve | 228 | Castlereagh | Kilkeevin | Castlereagh |
| Cloonlaughnam | 829 | Athlone | Tisrara | Roscommon |
| Cloonlee | 422 | Castlereagh | Kiltullagh | Castlereagh |
| Cloonlish (or Robinhood) | 257 | Castlereagh | Kiltullagh | Castlereagh |
| Cloonmaan | 93 | Boyle | Tumna | Carrick on Shannon |
| Cloonmacmullan | 166 | Frenchpark | Kilnamanagh | Boyle |
| Cloonmagunnaun | 587 | Frenchpark | Kilnamanagh | Castlereagh |
| Cloonmahaan | 179 | Roscommon | Elphin | Strokestown |
| Cloonmaul | 453 | Frenchpark | Tibohine | Castlereagh |
| Cloonmeane | 125 | Ballintober North | Kilmore | Carrick on Shannon |
| Cloonmore | 349 | Ballintober South | Kilteevan | Roscommon |
| Cloonmore | 1,384 | Ballintober North | Termonbarry | Strokestown |
| Cloonmullenan | 93 | Ballymoe | Oran | Roscommon |
| Cloonmullin | 398 | Frenchpark | Tibohine | Castlereagh |
| Cloonmurly | 327 | Ballintober South | Kilteevan | Roscommon |
| Cloonmurray | 273 | Roscommon | Killukin | Strokestown |
| Cloonmustra | 168 | Ballintober South | Cloontuskert | Roscommon |
| Cloonoghil | 455 | Athlone | Taghmaconnell | Athlone |
| Cloonown | 2,469 | Athlone | St. Peter's | Athlone |
| Cloonrabrackan | 203 | Roscommon | Bumlin | Strokestown |
| Cloonradoon | 461 | Roscommon | Bumlin | Strokestown |
| Cloonrane | 278 | Roscommon | Cloonfinlough | Strokestown |
| Cloonree | 394 | Castlereagh | Kilkeevin | Castlereagh |
| Cloonreliagh | 226 | Castlereagh | Kiltullagh | Castlereagh |
| Cloonrollagh | 223 | Athlone | Drum | Athlone |
| Cloonroughan | 388 | Castlereagh | Kilkeevin | Castlereagh |
| Cloonroughan | 426 | Roscommon | Elphin | Strokestown |
| Cloonsellan | 416 | Ballintober South | Kilteevan | Roscommon |
| Cloonshaghan | 338 | Boyle | Estersnow | Boyle |
| Cloonshannagh | 64 | Ballintober North | Kilmore | Carrick on Shannon |
| Cloonshannagh | 607 | Roscommon | Bumlin | Strokestown |
| Cloonshannagh | 309 | Roscommon | Kiltrustan | Strokestown |
| Cloonshannagh | 665 | Ballintober North | Termonbarry | Strokestown |
| Cloonshanville | 929 | Frenchpark | Tibohine | Castlereagh |
| Cloonshask | 324 | Moycarn | Moore | Ballinasloe |
| Cloonshee | 233 | Roscommon | Clooncraff | Strokestown |
| Cloonshee (Connor) | 122 | Ballintober South | Kilgefin | Roscommon |
| Cloonshee (Hartland) | 139 | Ballintober South | Kilgefin | Roscommon |
| Cloonsheever | 875 | Frenchpark | Tibohine | Castlereagh |
| Cloonsillagh | 230 | Ballintober North | Kilmore | Carrick on Shannon |
| Cloonskeeveen | 133 | Boyle | Tumna | Carrick on Shannon |
| Cloonslanor | 392 | Roscommon | Cloonfinlough | Strokestown |
| Cloonsreane | 212 | Roscommon | Killukin | Strokestown |
| Cloonsuck | 343 | Castlereagh | Kilkeevin | Castlereagh |
| Cloontarsna | 258 | Castlereagh | Kilkeevin | Castlereagh |
| Cloonteem | 260 | Ballintober North | Kilmore | Carrick on Shannon |
| Cloontimullan | 224 | Ballintober South | Kilteevan | Roscommon |
| Cloontogher | 254 | Ballintober South | Kilteevan | Roscommon |
| Cloontowart | 539 | Frenchpark | Tibohine | Castlereagh |
| Cloontrask | 409 | Castlereagh | Kilkeevin | Castlereagh |
| **Cloontuskert** | Town | Ballintober South | Cloontuskert | Roscommon |
| Cloontuskert | 820 | Ballintober South | Cloontuskert | Roscommon |
| Cloonulty | 439 | Moycarn | Moore | Ballinasloe |
| Cloonybeirne | 539 | Ballintober South | Roscommon | Roscommon |
| Cloonybeirne | 370 | Roscommon | Killukin | Strokestown |
| Cloonybrennan | 267 | Roscommon | Elphin | Strokestown |
| Cloonybrien | 83 | Boyle | Ardcarn | Boyle |
| Cloonycarran Beg | 13 | Roscommon | Lissonuffy | Strokestown |
| Cloonycarran More | 264 | Roscommon | Lissonuffy | Strokestown |
| Cloonycattan | 170 | Roscommon | Clooncraff | Carrick on Shannon |
| Cloonycolgan | 188 | Ballymoe | Oran | Roscommon |
| Cloonyeffer | 166 | Roscommon | Shankill | Strokestown |
| Cloonykelly | 231 | Athlone | Athleague | Roscommon |
| Cloonykerry | 309 | Castlereagh | Ballintober | Castlereagh |
| Cloonylyon | 202 | Roscommon | Cloonfinlough | Strokestown |
| Cloonyogan | 139 | Roscommon | Killukin | Strokestown |
| Cloonyourish | 264 | Athlone | Fuerty | Roscommon |
| Cloonyquin | 258 | Athlone | Fuerty | Roscommon |
| Cloonyquin | 528 | Roscommon | Elphin | Strokestown |
| Clydagh Lower | 165 | Castlereagh | Kiltullagh | Castlereagh |
| Clydagh Upper | 201 | Castlereagh | Kiltullagh | Castlereagh |
| Coarse Island | 1 | Ballintober North | Kilglass | Strokestown |
| Coffalstack | 100 | Roscommon | Lissonuffy | Strokestown |
| Coggalbeg | 276 | Ballintober South | Kilbride | Strokestown |
| Coggalfortyacres | 165 | Roscommon | Lissonuffy | Strokestown |
| Coggalkeenagh | 94 | Roscommon | Lissonuffy | Strokestown |
| Coggalmore | 86 | Roscommon | Lissonuffy | Strokestown |
| Coggalstack | 100 | Roscommon | Lissonuffy | Strokestown |
| Coggaltonroe | 119 | Roscommon | Lissonuffy | Strokestown |
| Commeen | 79 | Athlone | Dysart | Athlone |
| Commeen | 176 | Roscommon | Clooncraff | Strokestown |
| Commons | 1 | Athlone | Taghboy | Athlone |
| Commons | 80 | Castlereagh | Kiltullagh | Castlereagh |
| Cooladye | 177 | Boyle | Tumna | Boyle |
| Coolagarry | 607 | Athlone | Cam | Athlone |
| Coolagarry | 157 | Frenchpark | Tibohine | Castlereagh |
| Coolaphubble | 133 | Athlone | Kilmeane | Roscommon |
| Coolatinny | 216 | Castlereagh | Kiltullagh | Castlereagh |
| Coolatober | 697 | Athlone | Taghboy | Athlone |
| Coolcam | 243 | Castlereagh | Kiltullagh | Castlereagh |
| Coolderry | 220 | Moycarn | Creagh | Ballinasloe |
| Coolderry | 139 | Moycarn | Moore | Ballinasloe |
| Coolderry | 424 | Athlone | Tisrara | Roscommon |
| Cooldorragh | 119 | Athlone | Dysart | Athlone |
| Coolfree | 472 | Athlone | Taghmaconnell | Ballinasloe |
| Coollusty | 356 | Athlone | Athleague | Roscommon |
| Coolmeen | 247 | Roscommon | Clooncraff | Roscommon |
| Coolmeen | 145 | Athlone | Fuerty | Roscommon |
| Coolnageer | 578 | Athlone | Cam | Athlone |
| Coolnagranshy | 70 | Boyle | Boyle | Boyle |
| Coolougher | 258 | Castlereagh | Kiltullagh | Castlereagh |
| Coolshaghtena | 672 | Ballintober South | Cloontuskert | Roscommon |
| Cooltacker | 84 | Ballintober South | Kilgefin | Roscommon |
| Coolteige | 118 | Ballintober South | Kilbride | Roscommon |
| Cooltona | 116 | Athlone | Kilmeane | Roscommon |
| Coolumber | 396 | Moycarn | Moore | Ballinasloe |
| Cooly | 456 | Athlone | Fuerty | Roscommon |
| Coosaun | 133 | Castlereagh | Kiltullagh | Castlereagh |
| Cootehall | 225 | Boyle | Tumna | Boyle |
| Copse | 226 | Boyle | Boyle | Boyle |
| Corbally | 121 | Roscommon | Kilcooley | Strokestown |
| Corbally (or Ballymore East) | 395 | Boyle | Boyle | Boyle |
| Corbally and Slieve | 1,181 | Ballymoe | Ballynakill | Roscommon |
| Corbally East | 158 | Frenchpark | Creeve | Carrick on Shannon |
| Corbally Middle | 172 | Frenchpark | Creeve | Carrick on Shannon |
| Corbally West | 223 | Frenchpark | Creeve | Carrick on Shannon |
| Corbaun | 151 | Ballintober North | Kilmore | Carrick on Shannon |
| Corbo | 370 | Ballintober South | Kilbride | Roscommon |
| Corboghil | 139 | Roscommon | Cloonfinlough | Strokestown |
| Corboley | 366 | Athlone | Killinvoy | Roscommon |
| Corderry | 212 | Boyle | Ardcarn | Boyle |
| Corderryhugh | 193 | Athlone | Fuerty | Roscommon |
| Cordrehid | 183 | Boyle | Killukin | Carrick on Shannon |
| Cordrumman | 325 | Roscommon | Bumlin | Strokestown |
| Cordrumman | 89 | Roscommon | Kiltrustan | Strokestown |
| Corgarrow | 241 | Roscommon | Kiltrustan | Strokestown |
| Corgarve | 279 | Frenchpark | Creeve | Carrick on Shannon |
| Corgarve | 131 | Athlone | Kilmeane | Roscommon |
| Corglass | 287 | Boyle | Kilronan | Boyle |
| Corgorman | 160 | Boyle | Kilronan | Boyle |
| Corgowan | 172 | Ballintober North | Kilglass | Strokestown |
| Corgullion | 227 | Ballintober North | Kilmore | Carrick on Shannon |
| Corhawny | 157 | Roscommon | Lissonuffy | Strokestown |
| Corkeenagh | 71 | Roscommon | Clooncraff | Strokestown |
| Corker | 141 | Roscommon | Kilcooley | Strokestown |
| Corkip | 132 | Athlone | Taghmaconnell | Athlone |
| Corlis | 151 | Roscommon | Aughrim | Carrick on Shannon |
| Corlis | 537 | Castlereagh | Baslick | Castlereagh |
| Cornabanny | 232 | Castlereagh | Kiltullagh | Castlereagh |
| Cornacarta | 332 | Boyle | Boyle | Boyle |
| Cornafulla | 801 | Athlone | Drum | Athlone |
| Cornagee | 172 | Boyle | Kilronan | Boyle |
| Cornageeha | 311 | Athlone | Cam | Athlone |
| Cornaglia | 490 | Boyle | Boyle | Boyle |
| Cornagrea | 204 | Boyle | Ardcarn | Boyle |
| Cornalee | 617 | Athlone | Cam | Athlone |
| Cornalee | 14 | Athlone | Dysart | Athlone |
| Cornamaddy | 150 | Athlone | Kilmeane | Roscommon |
| Cornamart | 180 | Athlone | Killinvoy | Roscommon |
| Cornameelta | 725 | Boyle | Boyle | Boyle |
| Cornamucklagh | 65 | Boyle | Ardcarn | Boyle |
| Cornamucklagh (or Falmore) | 478 | Castlereagh | Kilcorkey | Castlereagh |
| Cornapallis | 116 | Athlone | Tisrara | Roscommon |
| Cornaseer | 371 | Athlone | Kiltoom | Athlone |
| Cornashinnagh | 238 | Ballintober South | Kilbride | Roscommon |
| Cornasleehan | 157 | Ballintober North | Kilmore | Carrick on Shannon |
| Cornaveagh | 399 | Moycarn | Moore | Ballinasloe |
| Cornaveagh | 371 | Boyle | Estersnow | Boyle |
| Corra More (or Gorteencloogh) | 682 | Athlone | Athleague | Roscommon |
| Corrabaun | 312 | Roscommon | Elphin | Strokestown |
| Corrabeg | 80 | Roscommon | Kilcooley | Strokestown |
| Corraclogh | 190 | Athlone | Kiltoom | Athlone |
| Corracoggil North | 523 | Frenchpark | Tibohine | Castlereagh |
| Corracoggil South | 354 | Frenchpark | Tibohine | Castlereagh |
| Corracreigh | 396 | Roscommon | Elphin | Strokestown |
| Corradrehid | 407 | Ballintober South | Kilbride | Roscommon |
| Corradrehid | 139 | Roscommon | Lissonuffy | Strokestown |
| Corragarve | 136 | Roscommon | Kilcooley | Strokestown |
| Corralara | 198 | Ballintober North | Kilmore | Carrick on Shannon |
| Corralea | 373 | Athlone | Cam | Athlone |
| Corramagrine | 203 | Ballintober North | Termonbarry | Strokestown |
| Corramore | 1,157 | Athlone | Kiltoom | Athlone |
| Corrantotan | 171 | Athlone | Kiltoom | Athlone |
| Corraree (or Ballygatta) | 525 | Athlone | Taghmaconnell | Athlone |
| Corraslira | 365 | Roscommon | Ogulla | Strokestown |
| Corrasluastia | 520 | Castlereagh | Kiltullagh | Castlereagh |
| Corrastoona Beg | 201 | Ballymoe | Drumatemple | Castlereagh |
| Corrastoona More | 327 | Ballymoe | Drumatemple | Castlereagh |
| Corratrench | 88 | Boyle | Ardcarn | Boyle |
| Corraun | 426 | Ballintober North | Termonbarry | Strokestown |
| Corrcommeen | 366 | Frenchpark | Tibohine | Castlereagh |
| Correagh | 55 | Roscommon | Kilcooley | Strokestown |
| Correal | 330 | Athlone | Fuerty | Roscommon |
| Correal | 342 | Athlone | Tisrara | Roscommon |
| Correen | 308 | Moycarn | Moore | Ballinasloe |
| Correenbeg | 399 | Moycarn | Moore | Ballinasloe |
| Corroy | 244 | Frenchpark | Kilmacumsy | Boyle |
| Corroy | 201 | Athlone | Kilmeane | Roscommon |
| Corry | 804 | Roscommon | Aughrim | Carrick on Shannon |
| Corry | 101 | Ballintober North | Kilmore | Carrick on Shannon |
| Corry | 319 | Ballintober South | Kilgefin | Roscommon |
| Corry East | 164 | Roscommon | Shankill | Boyle |
| Corry West | 167 | Roscommon | Shankill | Boyle |
| Corskeagh | 314 | Frenchpark | Tibohine | Castlereagh |
| Corskeagh | 169 | Roscommon | Kiltrustan | Strokestown |
| Cortober | 183 | Boyle | Killukin | Carrick on Shannon |
| Cortrasna | 85 | Boyle | Ardcarn | Boyle |
| Cranberry Island | 386 | Moycarn | Moore | Ballinasloe |
| Crancam | 100 | Athlone | Drum | Athlone |
| Crannagh | 327 | Athlone | Drum | Athlone |
| Crannagh Beg | 204 | Athlone | Drum | Athlone |
| Crannagh More | 403 | Athlone | Drum | Athlone |
| Creagh | 191 | Athlone | Drum | Athlone |
| Creagh | 273 | Moycarn | Creagh | Ballinasloe |
| Creaghnakirka | 72 | Roscommon | Aughrim | Carrick on Shannon |
| Creeharmore | 355 | Athlone | Taghboy | Athlone |
| Creemully & Aghagad Beg | 940 | Athlone | Fuerty | Roscommon |
| Creen (or Tonroe) | 306 | Frenchpark | Kilnamanagh | Boyle |
| Creeve | 192 | Ballymoe | Oran | Roscommon |
| Creeve | 324 | Roscommon | Creeve | Strokestown |
| Creeve | 143 | Roscommon | Shankill | Strokestown |
| Creevelea | 138 | Ballymoe | Cloonygormican | Castlereagh |
| Creevolan | 173 | Frenchpark | Creeve | Carrick on Shannon |
| Creevy | 644 | Frenchpark | Tibohine | Castlereagh |
| Creevyquin | 229 | Ballintober South | Kilteevan | Roscommon |
| Cregga | 480 | Roscommon | Kiltrustan | Strokestown |
| Creggameen | 571 | Castlereagh | Kilkeevin | Castlereagh |
| Creggan | 892 | Athlone | Drum | Athlone |
| Creggan | 390 | Moycarn | Moore | Ballinasloe |
| Creggan | 115 | Athlone | Killinvoy | Roscommon |
| Cregganabeaka | 242 | Athlone | Drum | Athlone |
| Creggancor | 635 | Castlereagh | Kilkeevin | Castlereagh |
| Cregganycarna | 312 | Athlone | Taghmaconnell | Ballinasloe |
| Creggaslin | 120 | Castlereagh | Kilkeevin | Castlereagh |
| Creglahan | 447 | Castlereagh | Kilkeevin | Castlereagh |
| Creta | 112 | Roscommon | Kiltrustan | Strokestown |
| Croghan | 387 | Boyle | Killukin | Boyle |
| Cronin | 202 | Athlone | Taghboy | Athlone |
| Crooderry | 113 | Boyle | Ardcarn | Boyle |
| Crosshill | 261 | Boyle | Kilronan | Boyle |
| Crossna | 203 | Boyle | Ardcarn | Boyle |
| Crowsgap | 84 | Athlone | Kilmeane | Roscommon |
| Cruit | 49 | Athlone | Kilmeane | Roscommon |
| Crunkill | 105 | Ballintober North | Kilglass | Strokestown |
| Cuilbalkeen | 218 | Boyle | Kilronan | Boyle |
| Cuilbeg | 332 | Ballintober North | Termonbarry | Strokestown |
| Cuilfadda and Derrinshin | 530 | Athlone | Taghmaconnell | Athlone |
| Cuilglass | 42 | Athlone | Drum | Athlone |
| Cuilkeel | 106 | Boyle | Kilronan | Boyle |
| Cuillard | 144 | Boyle | Kilronan | Boyle |
| Cuillawinnia | 282 | Athlone | Tisrara | Roscommon |
| Cuilleen | 49 | Athlone | Drum | Athlone |
| Cuilleen | 1,115 | Moycarn | Creagh | Ballinasloe |
| Cuilleenirwan | 400 | Athlone | Dysart | Athlone |
| Cuilleenoolagh | 526 | Athlone | Dysart | Athlone |
| Cuilmore | 516 | Athlone | Taghmaconnell | Athlone |
| Cuilmore | 26 | Boyle | Ardcarn | Boyle |
| Cuilmore | 243 | Roscommon | Clooncraff | Strokestown |
| Cuilmore | 165 | Roscommon | Kiltrustan | Strokestown |
| Cuilnakeava | 126 | Athlone | Taghboy | Roscommon |
| Cuilrevagh | 418 | Roscommon | Kiltrustan | Strokestown |
| Cuiltaboolie | 144 | Boyle | Ardcarn | Boyle |
| Cuiltyboe | 227 | Frenchpark | Tibohine | Castlereagh |
| Cuiltyconeen | 137 | Boyle | Tumna | Carrick on Shannon |
| Cuiltyconway | 163 | Ballintober North | Kilmore | Carrick on Shannon |
| Cuiltygower | 170 | Boyle | Kilronan | Boyle |
| Cuiltyshinnoge | 234 | Ballintober North | Kilmore | Carrick on Shannon |
| Culkeen | 354 | Castlereagh | Kiltullagh | Castlereagh |
| Culleenaghamore | 662 | Ballintober North | Kilglass | Strokestown |
| Culleenanory | 167 | Roscommon | Lissonuffy | Strokestown |
| Culleenatreen (or Flagford) | 185 | Boyle | Killummod | Carrick on Shannon |
| Culleenrevagh | 212 | Roscommon | Aughrim | Carrick on Shannon |
| Culliagh Lower | 238 | Roscommon | Bumlin | Strokestown |
| Culliagh Upper | 180 | Roscommon | Bumlin | Strokestown |
| Culliagharny | 579 | Moycarn | Creagh | Ballinasloe |
| Culliaghbeg | 525 | Moycarn | Creagh | Ballinasloe |
| Culliaghmore | 1,651 | Moycarn | Moore | Ballinasloe |
| Culliaghy | 45 | Ballintober South | Cloontuskert | Roscommon |
| Curragh | 109 | Castlereagh | Kiltullagh | Castlereagh |
| Curraghadoon | 256 | Athlone | Taghboy | Athlone |
| Curraghagower | 358 | Moycarn | Moore | Ballinasloe |
| Curraghalaher | 97 | Athlone | St. Johns | Athlone |
| Curraghaleen | 439 | Athlone | Drum | Athlone |
| Curraghard | 319 | Frenchpark | Tibohine | Castlereagh |
| **Curraghboy** | Town | Athlone | Cam | Athlone |
| Curraghboy | 743 | Athlone | Cam | Athlone |
| Curraghduffy | 80 | Roscommon | Lissonuffy | Strokestown |
| Curraghnaboley | 71 | Boyle | Kilronan | Boyle |
| Curraghnaboll | 410 | Athlone | Drum | Athlone |
| Curraghnaveen | 123 | Athlone | Rahara | Roscommon |
| Curraghroe | 146 | Roscommon | Lissonuffy | Strokestown |
| Curraghsallagh | 1,099 | Frenchpark | Tibohine | Swineford |
| Curreentorpan | 347 | Frenchpark | Tibohine | Castlereagh |
| Curry | 861 | Athlone | Cam | Athlone |
| Curry | 956 | Athlone | Kilmeane | Roscommon |
| Curry | 136 | Roscommon | Clooncraff | Strokestown |
| Curry | 102 | Roscommon | Cloonfinlough | Strokestown |
| Curry | 219 | Roscommon | Kiltrustan | Strokestown |
| Curryroe | 195 | Athlone | Drum | Athlone |
| Dacklin | 191 | Boyle | Killummod | Carrick on Shannon |
| Danesfort | 385 | Boyle | Killummod | Carrick on Shannon |
| Dangan (King) | 170 | Ballintober North | Kilmore | Carrick on Shannon |
| Dangan (Nugent) | 308 | Ballintober North | Kilmore | Carrick on Shannon |
| Davis's Island | 38 | Boyle | Tumna | Boyle |
| Deanery | 92 | Roscommon | Elphin | Strokestown |
| Deerpark | 794 | Boyle | Boyle | Boyle |
| Deerpark | 69 | Boyle | Killukin | Carrick on Shannon |
| Deerpark | 31 | Boyle | Killummod | Carrick on Shannon |
| Deerpark | 103 | Castlereagh | Kilcorkey | Castlereagh |
| Demesne | 1,499 | Boyle | Ardcarn | Boyle |
| Demesne | 103 | Boyle | Boyle | Boyle |
| Demesne | 436 | Boyle | Kilbryan | Boyle |
| Demesne | 557 | Castlereagh | Kilkeevin | Castlereagh |
| Dergraw | 285 | Boyle | Ardcarn | Carrick on Shannon |
| Derinshin and Cuilfadda (or Cuilfada) | 530 | Athlone | Taghmaconnell | Athlone |
| Derrane | 818 | Ballintober South | Kilbride | Roscommon |
| Derraun | 157 | Boyle | Killummod | Carrick on Shannon |
| Derreen | 149 | Boyle | Tumna | Carrick on Shannon |
| Derreen | 250 | Castlereagh | Kilcorkey | Castlereagh |
| Derreen | 129 | Castlereagh | Kilkeevin | Castlereagh |
| Derreen | 196 | Roscommon | Cloonfinlough | Strokestown |
| Derreen Island | 1 | Roscommon | Clooncraff | Strokestown |
| Derreenacoosan | 110 | Boyle | Ardcarn | Boyle |
| Derreenadouglas | 406 | Boyle | Ardcarn | Boyle |
| Derreenagan | 146 | Boyle | Kilbryan | Boyle |
| Derreenagarry | 127 | Boyle | Ardcarn | Boyle |
| Derreenahinch | 84 | Boyle | Ardcarn | Boyle |
| Derreenamackaun | 244 | Frenchpark | Tibohine | Castlereagh |
| Derreenanannagh | 197 | Boyle | Ardcarn | Carrick on Shannon |
| Derreenanarry | 127 | Boyle | Ardcarn | Boyle |
| Derreenargan | 451 | Boyle | Ardcarn | Boyle |
| Derreenasalt | 93 | Boyle | Ardcarn | Boyle |
| Derreenaseer | 190 | Boyle | Ardcarn | Boyle |
| Derreenasoo | 325 | Boyle | Tumna | Carrick on Shannon |
| Derreenatawy | 83 | Boyle | Ardcarn | Boyle |
| Derreenavicara | 149 | Boyle | Kilronan | Boyle |
| Derreenavoggy | 389 | Boyle | Kilronan | Boyle |
| Derreendooey | 163 | Boyle | Ardcarn | Boyle |
| Derreendorragh | 109 | Castlereagh | Kiltullagh | Castlereagh |
| Derreenine | 368 | Boyle | Ardcarn | Boyle |
| Derreenteige | 244 | Castlereagh | Kiltullagh | Castlereagh |
| Derreentunny | 100 | Boyle | Kilbryan | Boyle |
| Derrinea | 282 | Frenchpark | Tibohine | Castlereagh |
| Derrineel | 543 | Moycarn | Moore | Ballinasloe |
| Derrineel | 214 | Athlone | Athleague | Roscommon |
| Derrinisky | 146 | Boyle | Kilronan | Boyle |
| Derrinlurg | 218 | Athlone | Tisrara | Roscommon |
| Derrinturk | 125 | Ballintober South | Kilteevan | Roscommon |
| Derry | 170 | Frenchpark | Tibohine | Castlereagh |
| Derrycahill | 501 | Athlone | Dysart | Athlone |
| Derrycanan | 436 | Ballintober South | Kilbride | Roscommon |
| Derrycarbry | 271 | Ballintober South | Kilteevan | Roscommon |
| Derrycashel | 256 | Boyle | Ardcarn | Boyle |
| Derrycashel | 849 | Roscommon | Lissonuffy | Strokestown |
| Derrycashel (or Bridgecartron) | 362 | Boyle | Ardcarn | Boyle |
| Derrycoagh | 114 | Frenchpark | Kilnamanagh | Boyle |
| Derryconny | 64 | Ballintober South | Kilbride | Roscommon |
| Derrydonnell | 207 | Ballintober South | Roscommon | Roscommon |
| Derryfeacle | 134 | Ballintober North | Kilglass | Strokestown |
| Derrygirraun | 392 | Boyle | Ardcarn | Carrick on Shannon |
| Derryglad | 228 | Athlone | Cam | Athlone |
| Derryhanee | 348 | Roscommon | Lissonuffy | Strokestown |
| Derryharraun East | 130 | Castlereagh | Kiltullagh | Castlereagh |
| Derryharraun West | 259 | Castlereagh | Kiltullagh | Castlereagh |
| Derryherk | 365 | Boyle | Ardcarn | Boyle |
| Derrylahan | 897 | Moycarn | Moore | Ballinasloe |
| Derrylahan | 256 | Castlereagh | Kiltullagh | Castlereagh |
| Derrylahan | 250 | Frenchpark | Tibohine | Castlereagh |
| Derrylow | 424 | Boyle | Killukin | Boyle |
| Derrymacstur | 143 | Ballintober North | Kilglass | Strokestown |
| Derrymaquirk | 281 | Boyle | Boyle | Boyle |
| Derrymoylin | 476 | Ballintober North | Termonbarry | Strokestown |
| Derrynadooey | 147 | Boyle | Kilronan | Boyle |
| Derrynagallion | 46 | Boyle | Kilronan | Boyle |
| Derrynasee | 296 | Athlone | Kiltoom | Athlone |
| Derrynaskineen | 46 | Boyle | Ardcarn | Boyle |
| Derryonogh | 157 | Ballintober North | Termonbarry | Strokestown |
| Derryphatten | 151 | Roscommon | Killukin | Strokestown |
| Derryquirk | 227 | Roscommon | Kilcooley | Strokestown |
| Derryvung | 309 | Castlereagh | Kiltullagh | Castlereagh |
| Derryvunny | 184 | Boyle | Kilbryan | Boyle |
| Derrywanna | 95 | Boyle | Kilbryan | Boyle |
| Devenish Island | 20 | Moycarn | Moore | Ballinasloe |
| Dockery's Island | 1 | Ballintober North | Kilglass | Strokestown |
| Dogs Island | 1 | Athlone | Kilmeane | Roscommon |
| Dolanstown Kilcashel | 199 | Moycarn | Moore | Ballinasloe |
| Dooan | 66 | Ballintober North | Kilglass | Strokestown |
| Doogary | 306 | Boyle | Ardcarn | Boyle |
| Doogarymore | 260 | Ballintober South | Kilteevan | Roscommon |
| Dooghan | 557 | Athlone | Drum | Athlone |
| Dooherty | 310 | Ballintober South | Kilbride | Roscommon |
| Doon | 761 | Boyle | Boyle | Boyle |
| Doon | 242 | Roscommon | Killukin | Strokestown |
| Doonahaha | 45 | Roscommon | Lissonuffy | Strokestown |
| Doonard Beg | 140 | Roscommon | Kiltrustan | Strokestown |
| Doonard More | 275 | Roscommon | Kiltrustan | Strokestown |
| Dooneen | 861 | Frenchpark | Kilcolagh | Boyle |
| Dooneen | 393 | Roscommon | Clooncraff | Carrick on Shannon |
| Dooneen | 79 | Ballymoe | Cloonygormican | Castlereagh |
| Dooslattagh | 485 | Ballintober North | Kilglass | Strokestown |
| Doovoge | 182 | Athlone | St. Peter's | Athlone |
| Dorrary | 192 | Boyle | Tumna | Carrick on Shannon |
| Doughil | 666 | Roscommon | Cloonfinlough | Strokestown |
| Doughloon | 60 | Roscommon | Kiltrustan | Strokestown |
| Dower | 106 | Frenchpark | Kilnamanagh | Castlereagh |
| Drimnagh | 230 | Roscommon | Ogulla | Strokestown |
| Drinagh | 1,323 | Roscommon | Lissonuffy | Strokestown |
| Drinaun | 470 | Roscommon | Elphin | Strokestown |
| Driney | 520 | Frenchpark | Tibohine | Castlereagh |
| Drishaghan (or Cherryfield) | 174 | Roscommon | Shankill | Strokestown |
| Drishaghaun | 375 | Frenchpark | Kilcolagh | Boyle |
| Drishaghaun East | 176 | Castlereagh | Baslick | Castlereagh |
| Drishaghaun West | 166 | Castlereagh | Baslick | Castlereagh |
| Drishoge | 79 | Boyle | Killukin | Carrick on Shannon |
| Dromore | 126 | Boyle | Kilronan | Boyle |
| Dromore | 176 | Boyle | Tumna | Carrick on Shannon |
| Drum | 20 | Athlone | Drum | Athlone |
| Drum (or Warren) | 581 | Boyle | Boyle | Boyle |
| Drumagissaun | 197 | Ballintober North | Kilglass | Strokestown |
| Drumalagagh | 832 | Moycarn | Moore | Ballinasloe |
| Drumaloughr | 424 | Castlereagh | Kilkeevin | Castlereagh |
| Drumamoodan | 135 | Roscommon | Aughrim | Carrick on Shannon |
| Drumanilra (or Annag) | 166 | Boyle | Kilbryan | Boyle |
| Drumanilra (or Mounteagle) | 312 | Boyle | Tumna | Carrick on Shannon |
| Drumanone | 155 | Boyle | Boyle | Boyle |
| Drumastemple | 264 | Ballymoe | Drumatemple | Castlereagh |
| Drumatybonniff | 110 | Boyle | Tumna | Carrick on Shannon |
| Drumboylan | 207 | Boyle | Tumna | Carrick on Shannon |
| Drumbrick | 185 | Boyle | Ardcarn | Carrick on Shannon |
| Drumbrisny | 175 | Boyle | Tumna | Carrick on Shannon |
| Drumcleavry | 140 | Ballintober North | Kilmore | Carrick on Shannon |
| Drumcormick | 117 | Boyle | Ardcarn | Boyle |
| Drumdaff | 73 | Boyle | Kilronan | Boyle |
| Drumdaff | 276 | Ballintober South | Kilbride | Roscommon |
| Drumdoe | 449 | Boyle | Boyle | Boyle |
| Drumercool | 163 | Boyle | Killukin | Carrick on Shannon |
| Drumerr | 187 | Boyle | Killummod | Carrick on Shannon |
| Drumharlow | 144 | Boyle | Tumna | Boyle |
| Druminagh | 172 | Frenchpark | Tibohine | Castlereagh |
| Drumlahard | 236 | Boyle | Tumna | Carrick on Shannon |
| Drumlion | 241 | Boyle | Killukin | Carrick on Shannon |
| Drumlish | 347 | Roscommon | Clooncraff | Strokestown |
| Drumlosh | 1,493 | Athlone | Drum | Athlone |
| Drummad | 548 | Frenchpark | Tibohine | Castlereagh |
| Drumman | 117 | Roscommon | Elphin | Strokestown |
| Drumman Beg | 204 | Ballintober North | Kilglass | Strokestown |
| Drumman More | 548 | Ballintober North | Kilglass | Strokestown |
| Drummans Island | 37 | Boyle | Kilbryan | Boyle |
| Drummin | 265 | Castlereagh | Kilcorkey | Castlereagh |
| Drummod | 239 | Roscommon | Clooncraff | Strokestown |
| Drummullin | 94 | Roscommon | Clooncraff | Strokestown |
| Drumshannagh | 153 | Boyle | Boyle | Boyle |
| Drumsillagh | 140 | Boyle | Tumna | Boyle |
| Drumsillagh | 278 | Boyle | Ardcarn | Carrick on Shannon |
| Dundermot | 224 | Ballymoe | Drumatemple | Castlereagh |
| Dundonnell | 393 | Athlone | Taghmaconnell | Ballinasloe |
| Dungar | 36 | Frenchpark | Tibohine | Castlereagh |
| Dunmurraghoe | 75 | Roscommon | Elphin | Strokestown |
| Eden | 422 | Frenchpark | Tibohine | Castlereagh |
| Edenan | 42 | Roscommon | Shankill | Strokestown |
| Edenan and Kinclare | 624 | Roscommon | Shankill | Boyle |
| **Elphin** | Town | Roscommon | Elphin | Strokestown |
| Elphin | 787 | Roscommon | Elphin | Strokestown |
| Emlagh | 261 | Frenchpark | Kilnamanagh | Boyle |
| Emlagh | 134 | Boyle | Tumna | Boyle |
| Emlagh | 458 | Castlereagh | Baslick | Castlereagh |
| Emlagh | 231 | Castlereagh | Kilkeevin | Castlereagh |
| Emlagh | 182 | Roscommon | Elphin | Strokestown |
| Emlagh Beg | 231 | Ballymoe | Oran | Roscommon |
| Emlagh More | 664 | Ballymoe | Oran | Roscommon |
| Emlaghglasny | 363 | Ballymoe | Ballynakill | Castlereagh |
| Emlaghkeadew | 548 | Athlone | Fuerty | Roscommon |
| Emlaghnagree | 267 | Ballymoe | Oran | Roscommon |
| Emlaghyroyin | 417 | Ballymoe | Dunamon | Roscommon |
| Emmoo | 247 | Ballintober South | Roscommon | Roscommon |
| Enagh | 277 | Boyle | Killukin | Boyle |
| Enfield | 413 | Castlereagh | Ballintober | Castlereagh |
| Erenagh | 154 | Ballintober South | Cloontuskert | Roscommon |
| Erra | 854 | Roscommon | Lissonuffy | Strokestown |
| Erriblagh | 177 | Frenchpark | Creeve | Carrick on Shannon |
| Errick Beg | 47 | Athlone | Tisrara | Roscommon |
| Errick More | 129 | Athlone | Tisrara | Roscommon |
| Errironagh | 367 | Boyle | Ardcarn | Boyle |
| Erris | 323 | Boyle | Boyle | Boyle |
| Errit | 1,203 | Frenchpark | Tibohine | Castlereagh |
| Esker | 260 | Athlone | Taghmaconnell | Athlone |
| Esker Beg | 176 | Athlone | Taghmaconnell | Athlone |
| Eskerbaun | 490 | Athlone | Cam | Athlone |
| Estersnow | 216 | Boyle | Estersnow | Boyle |
| Evikeens | 198 | Boyle | Boyle | Boyle |
| Fairymount | 676 | Ballintober South | Kilgefin | Roscommon |
| Falledeen | 104 | Castlereagh | Kiltullagh | Castlereagh |
| Falmore & Cornamucklagh | 478 | Castlereagh | Kilcorkey | Castlereagh |
| Falsk | 198 | Roscommon | Killukin | Strokestown |
| Faltia | 432 | Moycarn | Moore | Ballinasloe |
| Farbreagues | 222 | Athlone | Kilmeane | Roscommon |
| Farnbeg | 189 | Roscommon | Bumlin | Strokestown |
| Farnmore | 173 | Roscommon | Cloonfinlough | Strokestown |
| Farranagalliagh | 98 | Boyle | Estersnow | Boyle |
| Farranagalliagh East | 49 | Boyle | Ardcarn | Boyle |
| Farranagalliagh West | 42 | Boyle | Ardcarn | Boyle |
| Farranawillin | 100 | Castlereagh | Baslick | Castlereagh |
| Farrankelly | 419 | Athlone | Fuerty | Roscommon |
| Faus | 574 | Boyle | Estersnow | Boyle |
| Fawnanierin | 146 | Boyle | Kilbryan | Boyle |
| Feacle | 459 | Athlone | Taghmaconnell | Athlone |
| Feamore | 123 | Athlone | Kiltoom | Athlone |
| Fearagh | 901 | Athlone | Kilmeane | Roscommon |
| Fearagh (Caddell) | 227 | Ballintober North | Kilmore | Carrick on Shannon |
| Fearagh (Mahon) | 264 | Ballintober North | Kilmore | Carrick on Shannon |
| Fearaghafin | 88 | Ballymoe | Oran | Roscommon |
| Fearmore | 50 | Ballintober South | Kilbride | Roscommon |
| Feenagh (or Tonroe) | 217 | Frenchpark | Kilnamanagh | Boyle |
| Feevagh | 120 | Athlone | Dysart | Athlone |
| Feevagh Beg | 244 | Athlone | Dysart | Athlone |
| Feevagh More | 954 | Athlone | Dysart | Athlone |
| Ferrinch Island | 3 | Ballintober South | Cloontuskert | Roscommon |
| Fiddaun | 180 | Castlereagh | Kiltullagh | Castlereagh |
| Figh | 734 | Frenchpark | Tibohine | Castlereagh |
| Finisclin | 527 | Boyle | Estersnow | Boyle |
| Finnor | 365 | Boyle | Killummod | Carrick on Shannon |
| Flagford (or Culleenatreen) | 185 | Boyle | Killummod | Carrick on Shannon |
| Flanafreeson (or Goat Island) | 1 | Roscommon | Clooncraff | Strokestown |
| Flaskagh Beg | 87 | Roscommon | Elphin | Strokestown |
| Flaskagh More | 191 | Roscommon | Elphin | Strokestown |
| Flegans | 32 | Athlone | Kiltoom | Athlone |
| Foghanagh Beg | 148 | Ballymoe | Drumatemple | Castlereagh |
| Foghanagh More | 268 | Ballymoe | Drumatemple | Castlereagh |
| Fortaugustus | 83 | Castlereagh | Kiltullagh | Castlereagh |
| Fostragh | 320 | Boyle | Ardcarn | Boyle |
| Foughil | 527 | Castlereagh | Kilkeevin | Castlereagh |
| Foxborough | 403 | Castlereagh | Kiltullagh | Castlereagh |
| Foxborough | 330 | Roscommon | Elphin | Strokestown |
| Foxhill | 147 | Boyle | Tumna | Carrick on Shannon |
| Frenchlawn | 413 | Castlereagh | Ballintober | Castlereagh |
| **Frenchpark** | Town | Frenchpark | Tibohine | Castlereagh |
| Frenchpark Demesne | 1,134 | Frenchpark | Tibohine | Castlereagh |
| **Fuerty** | Town | Athlone | Fuerty | Roscommon |
| Fuerty | 216 | Athlone | Fuerty | Roscommon |
| Funshinagh | 218 | Athlone | Tisrara | Roscommon |
| Funshinagh (Madden) | 241 | Athlone | Tisrara | Roscommon |
| Funshinagh (Trench) | 309 | Athlone | Tisrara | Roscommon |
| Galey | 439 | Athlone | Killinvoy | Roscommon |
| Galey Beg | 295 | Athlone | St. Johns | Athlone |
| Gallagh | 230 | Ballintober South | Cloontuskert | Roscommon |
| Gallowstown (or Lisnacroghy) | 229 | Ballintober South | Roscommon | Roscommon |
| Ganaveens | 59 | Athlone | Rahara | Roscommon |
| Garbally and Carrowduff | 924 | Athlone | Taghmaconnell | Athlone |
| Gardenstown | 207 | Ballintober South | Cloontuskert | Roscommon |
| Gardenstown (or Legvoy) | 176 | Boyle | Killukin | Carrick on Shannon |
| Garranlahan Beg | 128 | Castlereagh | Kiltullagh | Castlereagh |
| Garranlahan More | 171 | Castlereagh | Kiltullagh | Castlereagh |
| Garrow | 689 | Boyle | Boyle | Boyle |
| Garrowlougher | 121 | Boyle | Tumna | Boyle |
| Garryglass | 92 | Roscommon | Bumlin | Strokestown |
| Garrymona Island | 9 | Ballintober North | Kilmore | Carrick on Shannon |
| Garrynagawna | 427 | Athlone | Drum | Athlone |
| Garrynagawna Bog and Carrickynaghtan | 973 | Athlone | Drum | Athlone |
| Garrynagran | 336 | Athlone | Taghboy | Athlone |
| Garrynphort | 388 | Athlone | Cam | Athlone |
| Garrynphort | 116 | Athlone | Taghboy | Athlone |
| Garrynphort | 188 | Roscommon | Shankill | Castlereagh |
| Giddaun | 55 | Boyle | Kilronan | Boyle |
| Gillstown | 193 | Ballintober North | Kilglass | Strokestown |
| Glasdrumman | 111 | Boyle | Kilronan | Boyle |
| Glebe | 33 | Boyle | Ardcarn | Boyle |
| Glebe | 35 | Boyle | Boyle | Boyle |
| Glebe | 81 | Boyle | Kilronan | Boyle |
| Glebe | 30 | Roscommon | Aughrim | Carrick on Shannon |
| Glebe | 21 | Boyle | Killukin | Carrick on Shannon |
| Glebe | 37 | Athlone | Athleague | Roscommon |
| Glebe | 32 | Athlone | Fuerty | Roscommon |
| Glebe | 56 | Athlone | Killinvoy | Roscommon |
| Glebe | 23 | Ballintober North | Kilglass | Strokestown |
| Glebe | 26 | Ballintober North | Termonbarry | Strokestown |
| Glebe East | 34 | Frenchpark | Tibohine | Castlereagh |
| Glebe West | 35 | Frenchpark | Tibohine | Castlereagh |
| Glen | 40 | Ballintober North | Kilglass | Strokestown |
| Glenballythomas | 835 | Roscommon | Ogulla | Strokestown |
| Glenfin | 43 | Athlone | Rahara | Roscommon |
| Glenmore | 316 | Athlone | Taghmaconnell | Ballinasloe |
| Glenmore | 35 | Castlereagh | Kiltullagh | Castlereagh |
| Glennameeltoge (or Midgefield) | 90 | Roscommon | Cloonfinlough | Strokestown |
| Glennanammer | 177 | Athlone | Athleague | Roscommon |
| Glennanea | 262 | Athlone | Taghmaconnell | Athlone |
| Glenrevagh | 165 | Athlone | Taghboy | Athlone |
| Glenrevagh | 170 | Athlone | Kilmeane | Roscommon |
| Glentaun | 224 | Moycarn | Creagh | Ballinasloe |
| Glenties | 83 | Castlereagh | Kiltullagh | Castlereagh |
| Glenvela | 266 | Castlereagh | Baslick | Castlereagh |
| Glooria | 177 | Boyle | Estersnow | Boyle |
| Glooria | 199 | Boyle | Ardcarn | Carrick on Shannon |
| Goat Island (or Flanafreeson) | 1 | Roscommon | Clooncraff | Strokestown |
| Gort and Killiaghan | 764 | Athlone | St. Johns | Athlone |
| Gortacarnan | 49 | Athlone | Rahara | Roscommon |
| Gortacoosan | 138 | Athlone | Kiltoom | Athlone |
| Gortaganny | 443 | Frenchpark | Tibohine | Castlereagh |
| Gortaganny | 82 | Athlone | Rahara | Roscommon |
| Gortamarle | 101 | Castlereagh | Kiltullagh | Castlereagh |
| Gortanabla | 406 | Athlone | Taghmaconnell | Ballinasloe |
| Gortaphuill | 40 | Athlone | Cam | Athlone |
| Gortaphuill | 255 | Athlone | Taghboy | Athlone |
| Gortboy | 41 | Castlereagh | Ballintober | Castlereagh |
| Gortcloonagh | 199 | Ballymoe | Cloonygormican | Roscommon |
| Gorteenacammadil | 480 | Castlereagh | Kiltullagh | Castlereagh |
| Gorteenbrack | 94 | Athlone | Fuerty | Roscommon |
| Gorteencloogh (or Corra More) | 682 | Athlone | Athleague | Roscommon |
| Gortfree and Inchiroe | 263 | Athlone | Cam | Athlone |
| Gortgallan | 482 | Ballintober South | Cloontuskert | Roscommon |
| Gorticmeelra | 14 | Ballymoe | Oran | Roscommon |
| Gortleck | 96 | Boyle | Tumna | Carrick on Shannon |
| Gortlustia | 118 | Roscommon | Bumlin | Strokestown |
| Gortmore | 54 | Athlone | Fuerty | Roscommon |
| Gortnacloy | 435 | Frenchpark | Kilmacumsy | Boyle |
| Gortnacrannagh | 324 | Roscommon | Shankill | Strokestown |
| Gortnadarra | 63 | Athlone | Rahara | Roscommon |
| Gortnagoyne | 250 | Castlereagh | Kilcorkey | Castlereagh |
| Gortnasharoge | 194 | Moycarn | Creagh | Ballinasloe |
| Gortnasharvoge | 194 | Moycarn | Creagh | Ballinasloe |
| Gortnasillagh | 426 | Castlereagh | Baslick | Castlereagh |
| Gortnasoolboy | 119 | Athlone | Cam | Athlone |
| Gortnasythe | 219 | Athlone | Cam | Athlone |
| Gorttoose | 253 | Roscommon | Bumlin | Strokestown |
| Gortyleane | 107 | Ballintober South | Kilgefin | Roscommon |
| Graffoge | 483 | Roscommon | Bumlin | Strokestown |
| Gragullagh | 72 | Roscommon | Aughrim | Carrick on Shannon |
| Grallagh | 392 | Frenchpark | Tibohine | Castlereagh |
| Grallagh | 295 | Roscommon | Elphin | Strokestown |
| Grallagh Beg | 120 | Boyle | Boyle | Boyle |
| Grallagh More | 240 | Boyle | Boyle | Boyle |
| Granaghan (Dillon) | 477 | Roscommon | Lissonuffy | Strokestown |
| Granaghan (Martin) | 356 | Roscommon | Lissonuffy | Strokestown |
| Grange | 1,018 | Athlone | Cam | Athlone |
| Grange | 271 | Roscommon | Aughrim | Carrick on Shannon |
| Grange | 390 | Castlereagh | Kiltullagh | Castlereagh |
| Grange | 1,578 | Ballintober South | Kilbride | Roscommon |
| Grange | 246 | Roscommon | Kiltrustan | Strokestown |
| Grange | 102 | Roscommon | Ogulla | Strokestown |
| Grange Beg | 545 | Boyle | Boyle | Boyle |
| Grange More | 509 | Boyle | Boyle | Boyle |
| Granny | 504 | Boyle | Estersnow | Boyle |
| Greagh | 192 | Boyle | Kilronan | Boyle |
| Greaghacorra | 94 | Boyle | Kilronan | Boyle |
| Greaghnafarna | 298 | Boyle | Kilronan | Boyle |
| Greaghnageeragh | 316 | Boyle | Kilronan | Boyle |
| Greaghnaglogh | 318 | Boyle | Kilronan | Boyle |
| Greaghnaleava Beg | 75 | Boyle | Kilronan | Boyle |
| Greaghnaleava More | 83 | Boyle | Kilronan | Boyle |
| Greatmeadow | 105 | Boyle | Boyle | Boyle |
| Green Island | 1 | Boyle | Ardcarn | Boyle |
| Grevisk | 146 | Boyle | Ardcarn | Boyle |
| Greyfield | 189 | Boyle | Kilronan | Boyle |
| Gubbarudda | 357 | Boyle | Kilronan | Boyle |
| Harepark | 68 | Boyle | Boyle | Boyle |
| Harristown | 394 | Castlereagh | Kilkeevin | Castlereagh |
| Heathfield | 263 | Castlereagh | Baslick | Castlereagh |
| Hermit Island | 1 | Boyle | Kilbryan | Boyle |
| Highbog | 141 | Athlone | Rahara | Roscommon |
| Highlake (or Ardlagheen More) | 528 | Ballymoe | Cloonygormican | Castlereagh |
| Hillsend | 74 | Moycarn | Moore | Ballinasloe |
| **Hillstreet** | Town | Roscommon | Aughrim | Carrick on Shannon |
| **Hillstreet** | Town | Ballintober North | Kilmore | Carrick on Shannon |
| Hogs Island | 10 | Boyle | Boyle | Boyle |
| Hollymount (or Knockaculleen) | 540 | Boyle | Ardcarn | Boyle |
| Horse Island | 1 | Athlone | Kiltoom | Athlone |
| Hughestown | 106 | Boyle | Tumna | Boyle |
| Hundredacres | 230 | Castlereagh | Kiltullagh | Castlereagh |
| Illanamoe | 1 | Ballintober North | Kilglass | Strokestown |
| Illangarre | 1 | Roscommon | Clooncraff | Strokestown |
| Illangarre | 3 | Ballintober North | Kilglass | Strokestown |
| Illangarve | 1 | Roscommon | Clooncraff | Strokestown |
| Illangarve | 3 | Ballintober North | Kilglass | Strokestown |
| Inchinalee | 18 | Athlone | Drum | Athlone |
| Inchiroe and Gortfree | 263 | Athlone | Cam | Athlone |
| Inishatirra | 19 | Boyle | Tumna | Carrick on Shannon |
| Inishmoylin | 7 | Ballintober North | Kilglass | Strokestown |
| Island Lower | 205 | Ballymoe | Oran | Roscommon |
| Island Upper | 113 | Ballymoe | Oran | Roscommon |
| Jamestown | 363 | Athlone | Taghboy | Athlone |
| Johnstown Demesne | 745 | Athlone | Drum | Athlone |
| Kanefield | 159 | Castlereagh | Baslick | Castlereagh |
| Keadagh | 40 | Athlone | Kiltoom | Athlone |
| **Keadew** | Town | Boyle | Kilronan | Boyle |
| Keadew East | 318 | Boyle | Kilronan | Boyle |
| Keadew West | 273 | Boyle | Kilronan | Boyle |
| Keelbanada | 1,047 | Frenchpark | Kilcolman | Castlereagh |
| Keelcurragh (or Carrowreagh) | 53 | Ballintober South | Kilgefin | Roscommon |
| Keeloges | 45 | Athlone | Drum | Athlone |
| Keeloges | 164 | Boyle | Kilbryan | Boyle |
| Keelty | 196 | Athlone | Drum | Athlone |
| Keelty | 102 | Castlereagh | Ballintober | Castlereagh |
| Keenagh (Clanrickard) | 181 | Athlone | Athleague | Roscommon |
| Keenagh (Donnellan East) | 80 | Athlone | Athleague | Roscommon |
| Keenagh (Donnellan West) | 117 | Athlone | Athleague | Roscommon |
| Kellybrook | 422 | Athlone | Killinvoy | Roscommon |
| Kellybrook | 51 | Athlone | St. Johns | Roscommon |
| Kennyborough | 46 | Castlereagh | Ballintober | Castlereagh |
| Kerlagh | 59 | Ballintober North | Kilglass | Strokestown |
| Keyfield | 206 | Castlereagh | Kiltullagh | Castlereagh |
| Kilbarry | 861 | Ballintober North | Termonbarry | Strokestown |
| Kilbeg | 90 | Ballintober North | Kilglass | Strokestown |
| Kilbegly | 395 | Moycarn | Moore | Ballinasloe |
| Kilbride | 76 | Ballintober North | Kilmore | Carrick on Shannon |
| Kilbryan | 64 | Boyle | Kilbryan | Boyle |
| Kilcanoran | 113 | Roscommon | Aughrim | Carrick on Shannon |
| Kilcar | 776 | Athlone | Cam | Athlone |
| Kilcash | 683 | Athlone | Kilmeane | Roscommon |
| Kilcashel Dolanstown | 199 | Moycarn | Moore | Ballinasloe |
| Kilcloghan | 206 | Roscommon | Kiltrustan | Strokestown |
| Kilclogherna | 89 | Roscommon | Kiltrustan | Strokestown |
| Kilcock | 92 | Ballintober North | Kilmore | Carrick on Shannon |
| Kilcolagh | 248 | Frenchpark | Kilcolagh | Boyle |
| Kilcooley | 106 | Roscommon | Kilcooley | Strokestown |
| Kilcorkey | 215 | Castlereagh | Kilcorkey | Castlereagh |
| Kilcroy | 128 | Roscommon | Aughrim | Carrick on Shannon |
| Kildalloge | 205 | Roscommon | Kiltrustan | Strokestown |
| Kildurney | 211 | Athlone | Cam | Athlone |
| Kilfaughna | 164 | Boyle | Ardcarn | Boyle |
| Kilgarve | 224 | Moycarn | Creagh | Ballinasloe |
| Kilgarve | 179 | Boyle | Kilronan | Boyle |
| Kilgarve | 715 | Frenchpark | Tibohine | Castlereagh |
| Kilgarve | 324 | Ballintober North | Kilglass | Strokestown |
| Kilglass | 161 | Athlone | Kilmeane | Roscommon |
| Kilgraffy | 81 | Ballintober North | Kilglass | Strokestown |
| Kilkenny | 343 | Athlone | Taghmaconnell | Athlone |
| Killappoge | 212 | Boyle | Killummod | Boyle |
| Killarney | 346 | Ballintober South | Roscommon | Roscommon |
| Killastalliff | 134 | Ballintober North | Kilglass | Strokestown |
| Killaster | 312 | Castlereagh | Kilcorkey | Castlereagh |
| Killattimoriarty | 307 | Ballintober South | Kilgefin | Roscommon |
| Killavackan | 310 | Roscommon | Cloonfinlough | Strokestown |
| Killea | 58 | Athlone | Kilmeane | Roscommon |
| Killeen East | 197 | Roscommon | Shankill | Strokestown |
| Killeen West | 221 | Roscommon | Shankill | Strokestown |
| Killeenadeema | 172 | Athlone | Rahara | Roscommon |
| Killeenboy | 589 | Ballintober South | Kilteevan | Roscommon |
| Killeenrevagh | 288 | Athlone | Killinvoy | Roscommon |
| Killegan | 209 | Ballintober North | Kilglass | Strokestown |
| Killegian | 502 | Athlone | Taghmaconnell | Ballinasloe |
| Killeglan | 502 | Athlone | Taghmaconnell | Ballinasloe |
| Killerdoo | 48 | Boyle | Boyle | Boyle |
| Killerr | 270 | Ballymoe | Drumatemple | Castlereagh |
| Killiaghan and Gort | 764 | Athlone | St. Johns | Athlone |
| Killinaddan | 93 | Roscommon | Aughrim | Carrick on Shannon |
| Killinordan | 212 | Roscommon | Bumlin | Strokestown |
| Killinordanbeg | 245 | Roscommon | Bumlin | Strokestown |
| Killinraghty Big | 257 | Ballymoe | Oran | Roscommon |
| Killinraghty Little | 86 | Ballymoe | Oran | Roscommon |
| Killinvoy | 350 | Athlone | Killinvoy | Roscommon |
| Killoy | 123 | Athlone | Killinvoy | Athlone |
| Killukin | 149 | Boyle | Killukin | Carrick on Shannon |
| Killukin | 193 | Roscommon | Killukin | Strokestown |
| Killultagh | 87 | Roscommon | Cloonfinlough | Roscommon |
| Killummond | 348 | Boyle | Killummod | Carrick on Shannon |
| Killynagh Beg | 124 | Roscommon | Elphin | Strokestown |
| Killynagh More | 173 | Roscommon | Elphin | Strokestown |
| Kilmacananneny | 422 | Roscommon | Lissonuffy | Strokestown |
| Kilmacarril | 73 | Boyle | Tumna | Carrick on Shannon |
| Kilmacroy | 402 | Boyle | Boyle | Boyle |
| Kilmacuagh | 80 | Ballintober South | Kilgefin | Roscommon |
| Kilmacumsy | 365 | Frenchpark | Kilmacumsy | Boyle |
| Kilmass | 85 | Athlone | Rahara | Roscommon |
| Kilmocolmock | 437 | Athlone | Drum | Athlone |
| Kilmore | 127 | Athlone | Killinvoy | Athlone |
| Kilmore | 69 | Ballintober North | Kilmore | Carrick on Shannon |
| Kilmore | 206 | Castlereagh | Kilkeevin | Castlereagh |
| Kilmore | 503 | Athlone | Athleague | Roscommon |
| Kilmore | 216 | Roscommon | Bumlin | Strokestown |
| Kilmurry | 452 | Castlereagh | Baslick | Castlereagh |
| Kilnacloghy | 105 | Ballintober South | Cloontuskert | Roscommon |
| Kilnagralta | 201 | Athlone | Tisrara | Roscommon |
| Kilnalosset | 116 | Ballintober South | Kilgefin | Roscommon |
| Kilnamanagh | 356 | Athlone | St. Peter's | Athlone |
| Kilnamanagh | 456 | Frenchpark | Kilnamanagh | Boyle |
| Kilnamryall | 398 | Roscommon | Shankill | Boyle |
| Kilnanooan | 171 | Roscommon | Elphin | Strokestown |
| Kilnassillagh | 107 | Ballintober South | Kilgefin | Roscommon |
| Kilree | 161 | Roscommon | Ogulla | Strokestown |
| Kilroddan | 204 | Frenchpark | Tibohine | Castlereagh |
| Kilronan Mountain | 654 | Boyle | Kilronan | Boyle |
| Kilrooan | 144 | Frenchpark | Tibohine | Castlereagh |
| Kilroosky | 92 | Ballintober South | Kilgefin | Roscommon |
| Kilteasheen | 205 | Boyle | Kilbryan | Boyle |
| Kilteevan | 523 | Ballintober South | Kilteevan | Roscommon |
| Kiltoom | 115 | Athlone | Kiltoom | Athlone |
| Kiltrustan | 316 | Roscommon | Kiltrustan | Strokestown |
| Kiltullagh | 218 | Castlereagh | Kiltullagh | Castlereagh |
| Kiltultoge | 694 | Ballymoe | Cloonygormican | Roscommon |
| Kiltybanks | 813 | Frenchpark | Tibohine | Castlereagh |
| Kiltybrannock | 204 | Boyle | Boyle | Boyle |
| Kiltycreaghtan | 298 | Boyle | Boyle | Boyle |
| Kiltymaine | 330 | Frenchpark | Tibohine | Castlereagh |
| Kilvoy | 483 | Roscommon | Shankill | Castlereagh |
| Kinard | 234 | Roscommon | Clooncraff | Strokestown |
| Kinclare | 166 | Roscommon | Shankill | Boyle |
| Kinclare and Edenan | 624 | Roscommon | Shankill | Boyle |
| Kingsland | 666 | Frenchpark | Kilnamanagh | Boyle |
| Kinitty | 865 | Ballintober South | Kilbride | Roscommon |
| Knock | 679 | Athlone | Taghmaconnell | Ballinasloe |
| Knockacorha | 124 | Boyle | Killukin | Carrick on Shannon |
| Knockaculleen (or Hollymount) | 540 | Boyle | Ardcarn | Boyle |
| Knockadaff | 382 | Boyle | Ardcarn | Boyle |
| Knockadalteen | 148 | Boyle | Killukin | Carrick on Shannon |
| Knockadangan | 823 | Athlone | Athleague | Roscommon |
| Knockadoo | 107 | Boyle | Boyle | Boyle |
| Knockadoobrusna | 177 | Boyle | Boyle | Boyle |
| Knockadrehid | 182 | Boyle | Ardcarn | Boyle |
| Knockadryan | 75 | Boyle | Kilronan | Boyle |
| Knockalaghtar(Sandford) | 233 | Castlereagh | Ballintober | Castlereagh |
| Knockalaghtar(Wills) | 335 | Castlereagh | Ballintober | Castlereagh |
| Knockalegan East | 103 | Castlereagh | Baslick | Castlereagh |
| Knockalegan West | 126 | Castlereagh | Baslick | Castlereagh |
| Knockananima | 100 | Boyle | Killukin | Carrick on Shannon |
| Knockanyconor | 311 | Athlone | St. Johns | Athlone |
| Knockarush | 555 | Boyle | Boyle | Boyle |
| Knockavreaneen | 68 | Ballintober North | Kilmore | Carrick on Shannon |
| Knockavroe | 232 | Boyle | Boyle | Boyle |
| Knockavurrea | 29 | Ballintober South | Kilgefin | Roscommon |
| Knockavurrea | 122 | Roscommon | Elphin | Strokestown |
| **Knockcroghery** | Town | Athlone | Killinvoy | Roscommon |
| Knockcroghery | 217 | Athlone | Killinvoy | Roscommon |
| Knockdrumdonnell | 82 | Athlone | Kilmeane | Roscommon |
| Knockglass | 995 | Frenchpark | Kilcolagh | Boyle |
| Knockhall | 1,653 | Ballintober North | Kilglass | Strokestown |
| Knockmeane | 233 | Athlone | Kilmeane | Roscommon |
| Knockmurry | 21 | Castlereagh | Kilkeevin | Castlereagh |
| Knocknabarnaboy (or Ashbrook) | 246 | Roscommon | Lissonuffy | Strokestown |
| Knocknabeast | 61 | Boyle | Ardcarn | Boyle |
| Knocknacarrow | 128 | Boyle | Ardcarn | Boyle |
| Knocknacloy | 90 | Boyle | Boyle | Boyle |
| Knocknafushoga | 321 | Boyle | Estersnow | Boyle |
| Knocknagawna | 344 | Ballintober North | Kilmore | Carrick on Shannon |
| Knocknanool | 370 | Athlone | Kiltoom | Athlone |
| Knocknashee | 117 | Boyle | Boyle | Boyle |
| Knockranny | 376 | Boyle | Kilronan | Boyle |
| Knockroe | 32 | Boyle | Ardcarn | Boyle |
| Knockroe | 304 | Boyle | Estersnow | Boyle |
| Knockroe | 534 | Boyle | Killummod | Carrick on Shannon |
| Knockroe | 274 | Castlereagh | Kilcorkey | Castlereagh |
| Knockroe | 71 | Castlereagh | Kilkeevin | Castlereagh |
| Knockskehan | 235 | Athlone | St. Johns | Athlone |
| Knockvicar | 153 | Boyle | Ardcarn | Boyle |
| Kye | 350 | Roscommon | Clooncraff | Strokestown |
| Laboge | 62 | Athlone | Kilmeane | Roscommon |
| Lack | 427 | Ballintober North | Termonbarry | Strokestown |
| Lackagh | 128 | Ballintober North | Kilmore | Carrick on Shannon |
| Lackan | 180 | Frenchpark | Kilcolagh | Boyle |
| Lackan | 337 | Roscommon | Aughrim | Carrick on Shannon |
| Lackan | 370 | Roscommon | Cloonfinlough | Roscommon |
| Lackan | 216 | Athlone | Kilmeane | Roscommon |
| Lackan | 494 | Athlone | Rahara | Roscommon |
| Laghtcausk | 420 | Roscommon | Elphin | Strokestown |
| Lahagboy | 67 | Roscommon | Aughrim | Carrick on Shannon |
| Lahan Island | 2 | Boyle | Ardcarn | Boyle |
| Lamb Island | 3 | Moycarn | Moore | Ballinasloe |
| **Lanesborough** | Town | Ballintober South | Cloontuskert | Roscommon |
| Laragh and Ross | 736 | Ballymoe | Drumatemple | Castlereagh |
| Largan | 108 | Boyle | Kilbryan | Boyle |
| Largan | 211 | Roscommon | Kiltrustan | Strokestown |
| Laughil | 162 | Moycarn | Creagh | Ballinasloe |
| Laughil | 93 | Boyle | Tumna | Carrick on Shannon |
| Laughil | 81 | Castlereagh | Kiltullagh | Castlereagh |
| Lavagh | 536 | Ballintober North | Kilglass | Strokestown |
| Lavally | 160 | Roscommon | Kiltrustan | Strokestown |
| Leabeg | 494 | Ballymoe | Drumatemple | Castlereagh |
| Leam | 629 | Boyle | Boyle | Boyle |
| Leamore | 461 | Ballymoe | Ballynakill | Castlereagh |
| Lecarrow | 133 | Boyle | Boyle | Boyle |
| Lecarrow | 236 | Frenchpark | Creeve | Carrick on Shannon |
| Lecarrow | 92 | Castlereagh | Ballintober | Castlereagh |
| Lecarrow | 36 | Ballymoe | Drumatemple | Castlereagh |
| Lecarrow | 344 | Frenchpark | Tibohine | Castlereagh |
| Lecarrow | 261 | Roscommon | Clooncraff | Strokestown |
| Lecarrow | 199 | Ballintober North | Kilglass | Strokestown |
| Legan | 452 | Ballintober North | Kilglass | Strokestown |
| Leggatinty | 773 | Frenchpark | Tibohine | Castlereagh |
| Legvoy (or Gardenstown) | 176 | Boyle | Killukin | Carrick on Shannon |
| Leiterra | 160 | Boyle | Ardcarn | Boyle |
| Leitrim | 1,491 | Frenchpark | Tibohine | Castlereagh |
| Leitrim | 124 | Ballintober South | Kilbride | Roscommon |
| Lenanamalla | 125 | Athlone | Tisrara | Roscommon |
| Letfordspark | 53 | Boyle | Boyle | Boyle |
| Lettreen | 155 | Roscommon | Kiltrustan | Strokestown |
| Leveelick | 251 | Castlereagh | Kilkeevin | Castlereagh |
| Liberty | 258 | Moycarn | Moore | Ballinasloe |
| Lisbaun | 298 | Athlone | Kiltoom | Athlone |
| Lisboy | 207 | Castlereagh | Kilkeevin | Castlereagh |
| Lisboy | 235 | Roscommon | Shankill | Strokestown |
| Lisbride | 254 | Ballintober South | Roscommon | Roscommon |
| Liscam | 69 | Athlone | Cam | Athlone |
| Liscoffy (Kelly) | 222 | Athlone | Athleague | Roscommon |
| Liscoffy (Madden) | 152 | Athlone | Athleague | Roscommon |
| Liscolvan | 86 | Ballintober North | Kilmore | Carrick on Shannon |
| Lisdaly | 361 | Boyle | Killummod | Boyle |
| Lisdaulan | 709 | Athlone | Killinvoy | Roscommon |
| Lisdillure | 263 | Athlone | Drum | Athlone |
| Lisdrumneill | 329 | Frenchpark | Tibohine | Castlereagh |
| Lisduff | 297 | Frenchpark | Tibohine | Castlereagh |
| Lisduff | 221 | Athlone | Tisrara | Roscommon |
| Lisduff | 207 | Roscommon | Kiltrustan | Strokestown |
| Lisfarrellboy | 42 | Boyle | Tumna | Boyle |
| Lisfelim | 806 | Athlone | St. Johns | Athlone |
| Lisgarve | 218 | Frenchpark | Kilmacumsy | Boyle |
| Lisgillalea | 180 | Athlone | Tisrara | Roscommon |
| Lisgobban | 256 | Ballintober South | Kilbride | Roscommon |
| Lisgreaghan | 60 | Boyle | Ardcarn | Boyle |
| Lisheen | 199 | Castlereagh | Baslick | Castlereagh |
| Lisheen | 198 | Roscommon | Kiltrustan | Strokestown |
| Lisheenanierin | 90 | Roscommon | Cloonfinlough | Strokestown |
| Lisheenloughtin | 16 | Ballintober South | Kilbride | Roscommon |
| Lishugh | 124 | Roscommon | Aughrim | Carrick on Shannon |
| Lislea | 99 | Boyle | Kilronan | Boyle |
| Lisliddy | 155 | Castlereagh | Kilkeevin | Castlereagh |
| Lismacool | 378 | Frenchpark | Kilmacumsy | Boyle |
| Lismageevoge | 108 | Frenchpark | Creeve | Carrick on Shannon |
| Lismagroon | 49 | Athlone | Killinvoy | Roscommon |
| Lismaha | 239 | Athlone | Tisrara | Roscommon |
| Lismeehy | 123 | Roscommon | Lissonuffy | Strokestown |
| Lismoyle | 61 | Athlone | Cam | Athlone |
| Lismulkeare | 131 | Boyle | Ardcarn | Boyle |
| Lismurtagh | 217 | Castlereagh | Baslick | Castlereagh |
| Lismurtagh | 164 | Roscommon | Ogulla | Strokestown |
| Lisnaboll | 97 | Frenchpark | Kilmacumsy | Boyle |
| Lisnacroghy (or Gallowstown) | 229 | Ballintober South | Roscommon | Roscommon |
| Lisnagard | 180 | Roscommon | Elphin | Strokestown |
| Lisnagavragh | 393 | Athlone | Tisrara | Roscommon |
| Lisnagirra | 263 | Athlone | Athleague | Roscommon |
| Lisnagroagh | 66 | Athlone | Fuerty | Roscommon |
| Lisnagroob | 198 | Castlereagh | Kiltullagh | Castlereagh |
| Lisnahirka | 101 | Roscommon | Cloonfinlough | Strokestown |
| Lisnahoon | 70 | Athlone | Killinvoy | Roscommon |
| Lisnalannow | 64 | Athlone | Athleague | Roscommon |
| Lisnalegan | 150 | Ballymoe | Cloonygormican | Roscommon |
| Lisnamucklagh | 28 | Athlone | Dysart | Athlone |
| Lisnamucklagh | 244 | Athlone | Taghboy | Athlone |
| Lisnamult | 261 | Ballintober South | Roscommon | Roscommon |
| Lisnanarriagh | 335 | Ballintober South | Cloontuskert | Roscommon |
| Lisnaneane | 255 | Roscommon | Kilcooley | Strokestown |
| Lisnanuran | 200 | Roscommon | Aughrim | Carrick on Shannon |
| Lisnasillagh | 245 | Athlone | Athleague | Roscommon |
| Lisnatea | 146 | Athlone | Fuerty | Roscommon |
| Lisphilip | 146 | Frenchpark | Kilmacumsy | Boyle |
| Lisroyne | 448 | Roscommon | Bumlin | Strokestown |
| Lissacarrow | 178 | Athlone | Fuerty | Roscommon |
| Lissacurkia | 382 | Frenchpark | Tibohine | Castlereagh |
| Lissacurkia | 133 | Roscommon | Kilcooley | Strokestown |
| Lissadorn | 572 | Roscommon | Aughrim | Carrick on Shannon |
| Lissagallan | 1,000 | Athlone | Fuerty | Roscommon |
| Lissalway | 1,525 | Castlereagh | Baslick | Castlereagh |
| Lissananny | 545 | Frenchpark | Tibohine | Castlereagh |
| Lissaneaville | 500 | Athlone | Fuerty | Roscommon |
| Lissanisky | 105 | Athlone | Kilmeane | Roscommon |
| Lissanisky | 103 | Ballymoe | Oran | Roscommon |
| Lissaphobble | 64 | Roscommon | Lissonuffy | Strokestown |
| Lissaphuca | 148 | Athlone | Taghboy | Athlone |
| Lissaphuca | 111 | Roscommon | Kilcooley | Strokestown |
| Lissavilla | 116 | Roscommon | Aughrim | Carrick on Shannon |
| Lissawaddy | 214 | Castlereagh | Baslick | Castlereagh |
| Lisseenamanragh | 126 | Athlone | Taghboy | Athlone |
| Lisseevin | 110 | Boyle | Kilronan | Boyle |
| Lisserdrea | 611 | Boyle | Boyle | Boyle |
| Lissergool | 678 | Frenchpark | Tibohine | Castlereagh |
| Lissian | 387 | Frenchpark | Castlemore | Castlereagh |
| Lissonuffy | 168 | Roscommon | Lissonuffy | Strokestown |
| Lissydaly | 153 | Frenchpark | Tibohine | Castlereagh |
| Lissygreaghan | 103 | Athlone | Kiltoom | Athlone |
| Listhomasroe | 164 | Castlereagh | Kilkeevin | Castlereagh |
| Liswilliam | 259 | Athlone | Taghboy | Athlone |
| Lodge | 203 | Boyle | Killukin | Carrick on Shannon |
| Long Island | 144 | Athlone | St. Peter's | Athlone |
| Long Island | 29 | Moycarn | Moore | Ballinasloe |
| Long Island Little | 1 | Athlone | St. Peter's | Athlone |
| Longfield | 127 | Athlone | Rahara | Roscommon |
| Longford | 394 | Castlereagh | Kilkeevin | Castlereagh |
| Longnamuck | 231 | Athlone | Killinvoy | Roscommon |
| Loughbally | 452 | Frenchpark | Kilcolagh | Boyle |
| **Loughglinn** | Town | Frenchpark | Tibohine | Castlereagh |
| Loughglinn | 137 | Frenchpark | Tibohine | Castlereagh |
| Loughglinn Demesne | 1,105 | Frenchpark | Tibohine | Castlereagh |
| Loughlackagh | 156 | Moycarn | Moore | Ballinasloe |
| Loughnaneane | 184 | Ballintober South | Roscommon | Roscommon |
| Lowberry | 106 | Castlereagh | Kiltullagh | Castlereagh |
| Lowfield | 93 | Ballintober North | Kilmore | Carrick on Shannon |
| Lowparks | 68 | Boyle | Boyle | Boyle |
| Lowtown Kilcashel | 939 | Moycarn | Moore | Ballinasloe |
| Lugakeeran | 368 | Castlereagh | Kilcorkey | Castlereagh |
| Lugateane | 185 | Roscommon | Aughrim | Carrick on Shannon |
| Lugboy | 445 | Athlone | Taghmaconnell | Athlone |
| Lugboy | 257 | Roscommon | Elphin | Strokestown |
| Luggs | 64 | Roscommon | Kiltrustan | Strokestown |
| Lugnamuddagh (or Cashelfinoge) | 211 | Boyle | Boyle | Boyle |
| Lugnashammer | 151 | Boyle | Killukin | Boyle |
| Lurga | 195 | Boyle | Tumna | Carrick on Shannon |
| Lurgaboy | 111 | Boyle | Kilronan | Boyle |
| Lurgan | 294 | Frenchpark | Kilcolagh | Boyle |
| Lurgan | 81 | Boyle | Kilronan | Boyle |
| Lurgan | 215 | Roscommon | Shankill | Strokestown |
| Lurraga | 103 | Boyle | Kilronan | Boyle |
| Lustia | 290 | Boyle | Tumna | Carrick on Shannon |
| Lyonstown | 191 | Boyle | Ardcarn | Boyle |
| Lysterfield | 453 | Athlone | Cam | Athlone |
| Macnadille | 114 | Boyle | Killukin | Carrick on Shannon |
| Manor | 470 | Roscommon | Killukin | Strokestown |
| Mantuar | 327 | Frenchpark | Kilcolagh | Boyle |
| Martry | 194 | Frenchpark | Creeve | Carrick on Shannon |
| Marystown | 189 | Castlereagh | Kiltullagh | Castlereagh |
| Meehaun | 74 | Athlone | Killinvoy | Roscommon |
| Meelick | 122 | Ballintober North | Kilmore | Carrick on Shannon |
| Meelick | 33 | Castlereagh | Kiltullagh | Castlereagh |
| Meelick | 203 | Frenchpark | Tibohine | Castlereagh |
| Meelick | 316 | Ballintober North | Termonbarry | Strokestown |
| Meelickaduff | 99 | Castlereagh | Kilkeevin | Castlereagh |
| Meelickroe | 248 | Castlereagh | Kiltullagh | Castlereagh |
| Meeltraun (Daniel Kelly) | 138 | Castlereagh | Kiltullagh | Castlereagh |
| Meeltraun (Denis Kelly) | 125 | Castlereagh | Kiltullagh | Castlereagh |
| Meeltraun (O'Flyn) | 111 | Castlereagh | Kiltullagh | Castlereagh |
| Meeltraun (Wills) | 212 | Castlereagh | Kiltullagh | Castlereagh |
| Meera | 174 | Boyle | Tumna | Carrick on Shannon |
| Mewlaghmore | 124 | Castlereagh | Kilkeevin | Castlereagh |
| Midgefield (or Glennameeltoge) | 90 | Roscommon | Cloonfinlough | Strokestown |
| Mihanagh | 167 | Roscommon | Kiltrustan | Strokestown |
| Mihanboy | 278 | Athlone | Drum | Athlone |
| Milltown | 1,048 | Athlone | Dysart | Athlone |
| Milltown | 118 | Ballintober North | Kilmore | Carrick on Shannon |
| Milltown | 640 | Castlereagh | Baslick | Castlereagh |
| Milltown | 144 | Castlereagh | Kiltullagh | Castlereagh |
| Moanvane | 135 | Castlereagh | Kiltullagh | Castlereagh |
| Mocmoyne | 202 | Boyle | Boyle | Boyle |
| Moheedian | 344 | Frenchpark | Creeve | Carrick on Shannon |
| Moher | 521 | Ballintober South | Cloontuskert | Roscommon |
| Moher | 347 | Roscommon | Cloonfinlough | Strokestown |
| Moher | 240 | Ballintober North | Kilglass | Strokestown |
| Moigh | 171 | Boyle | Tumna | Carrick on Shannon |
| Moigh Lower | 170 | Castlereagh | Kiltullagh | Castlereagh |
| Moigh Upper | 167 | Castlereagh | Kiltullagh | Castlereagh |
| Moneen | 48 | Ballintober South | Cloontuskert | Roscommon |
| Moneenacully | 80 | Roscommon | Bumlin | Strokestown |
| Moneenbog | 113 | Ballintober North | Termonbarry | Strokestown |
| Moneyboy | 167 | Roscommon | Kilcooley | Strokestown |
| Moneyduff | 84 | Ballintober North | Kilmore | Carrick on Shannon |
| Moneylea | 235 | Roscommon | Elphin | Castlereagh |
| Moneymore | 408 | Athlone | Kilmeane | Roscommon |
| Mongagh | 341 | Roscommon | Lissonuffy | Strokestown |
| Monksland | 1,333 | Athlone | St. Peter's | Athlone |
| Moor | 227 | Castlereagh | Kilkeevin | Castlereagh |
| Moore North | 303 | Moycarn | Moore | Ballinasloe |
| Moore South | 571 | Moycarn | Moore | Ballinasloe |
| Mote Demesne | 1,263 | Athlone | Kilmeane | Roscommon |
| Mount Talbot | 657 | Athlone | Tisrara | Roscommon |
| Mountain Lower | 424 | Castlereagh | Kiltullagh | Castlereagh |
| Mountain Upper | 392 | Castlereagh | Kiltullagh | Castlereagh |
| Mountallen | 137 | Boyle | Kilronan | Boyle |
| Mountdelvin | 457 | Castlereagh | Kiltullagh | Castlereagh |
| Mountdillon | 1,369 | Roscommon | Lissonuffy | Strokestown |
| Mountdruid | 212 | Castlereagh | Kilcorkey | Castlereagh |
| Mounteagle (or Drumanilra) | 312 | Boyle | Tumna | Carrick on Shannon |
| Mountpleasant | 245 | Roscommon | Kilbride | Strokestown |
| Mountplunkett | 451 | Athlone | Killinvoy | Athlone |
| Mountprospect | 99 | Boyle | Ardcarn | Boyle |
| Moydow | 151 | Athlone | Kilmeane | Roscommon |
| Moyglass | 230 | Ballintober North | Kilmore | Carrick on Shannon |
| Moyglass | 402 | Ballintober North | Kilglass | Strokestown |
| Moyliss | 323 | Athlone | Fuerty | Roscommon |
| Moyne | 731 | Frenchpark | Tibohine | Castlereagh |
| Moynure | 156 | Athlone | Drum | Athlone |
| Moyoran | 210 | Boyle | Tumna | Carrick on Shannon |
| Moyvannan | 600 | Athlone | Kiltoom | Athlone |
| Muckanagh | 405 | Ballintober North | Kilglass | Strokestown |
| Muff | 306 | Athlone | Fuerty | Roscommon |
| Mullagh | 42 | Athlone | Kiltoom | Athlone |
| Mullaghardagh | 223 | Athlone | Taghboy | Athlone |
| Mullaghlusky | 55 | Boyle | Kilronan | Boyle |
| Mullaghmacormick | 596 | Ballintober North | Kilglass | Strokestown |
| Mullaghmore | 180 | Boyle | Killukin | Carrick on Shannon |
| Mullaghnashee | 423 | Frenchpark | Tibohine | Castlereagh |
| Mullaun | 166 | Boyle | Kilronan | Boyle |
| Mullen | 1,426 | Frenchpark | Tibohine | Castlereagh |
| Mullenduff | 251 | Frenchpark | Kilcolagh | Boyle |
| Mullygollan | 162 | Castlereagh | Baslick | Castlereagh |
| Mullymucks | 1,541 | Ballintober South | Kilbride | Roscommon |
| Nadnaveagh | 261 | Roscommon | Killukin | Strokestown |
| New Glebe | 17 | Ballintober South | Kilgefin | Roscommon |
| Newtown | 140 | Athlone | Drum | Athlone |
| Newtown | 278 | Moycarn | Creagh | Ballinasloe |
| Newtown | 355 | Ballintober South | Kilteevan | Roscommon |
| Newtown | 593 | Ballymoe | Oran | Roscommon |
| Newtown | 381 | Roscommon | Bumlin | Strokestown |
| Newtown | 566 | Ballintober North | Termonbarry | Strokestown |
| Newtown Farragher | 759 | Ballymoe | Cloonygormican | Castlereagh |
| Newtown Kilcashel | 282 | Moycarn | Moore | Ballinasloe |
| Newtowncarrigans | 231 | Ballymoe | Dunamon | Roscommon |
| Northyard | 441 | Roscommon | Bumlin | Strokestown |
| Oakfield | 283 | Roscommon | Cloonfinlough | Strokestown |
| Oakport Demesne | 587 | Boyle | Ardcarn | Boyle |
| Ogulla | 235 | Roscommon | Ogulla | Strokestown |
| Old Glebe (or Cartron) | 54 | Ballintober South | Kilgefin | Roscommon |
| Oldtown | 239 | Frenchpark | Kilmacumsy | Boyle |
| Oldtown Kilcashel | 403 | Moycarn | Moore | Ballinasloe |
| Onagh | 834 | Athlone | Taghmaconnell | Athlone |
| Oran | 275 | Ballymoe | Oran | Roscommon |
| Orchard Island | 7 | Boyle | Ardcarn | Boyle |
| O'Reilly's Island | 12 | Boyle | Kilronan | Boyle |
| Ovaun | 104 | Roscommon | Shankill | Strokestown |
| Paddock | 9 | Boyle | Ardcarn | Boyle |
| Parkeel | 271 | Frenchpark | Tibohine | Castlereagh |
| Parkmore | 293 | Moycarn | Creagh | Ballinasloe |
| Peak | 387 | Castlereagh | Kilcorkey | Castlereagh |
| Peak | 48 | Ballymoe | Cloonygormican | Roscommon |
| Pigeon Island | 10 | Ballintober North | Termonbarry | Strokestown |
| Pollalaher | 657 | Athlone | Cam | Athlone |
| Pollanalty East | 366 | Castlereagh | Kiltullagh | Castlereagh |
| Pollanalty West | 432 | Castlereagh | Kiltullagh | Castlereagh |
| Pollanaroo | 184 | Castlereagh | Kiltullagh | Castlereagh |
| Pollanea Lower | 152 | Castlereagh | Kiltullagh | Castlereagh |
| Pollanea Upper | 123 | Castlereagh | Kiltullagh | Castlereagh |
| Pollaphuca | 196 | Castlereagh | Kiltullagh | Castlereagh |
| Pollnamoghil | 66 | Roscommon | Aughrim | Carrick on Shannon |
| Pollower | 29 | Boyle | Ardcarn | Boyle |
| Pollower | 161 | Boyle | Kilbryan | Boyle |
| Pollranny | 138 | Castlereagh | Baslick | Castlereagh |
| Pollymount | 220 | Roscommon | Bumlin | Strokestown |
| Portaghard | 518 | Frenchpark | Tibohine | Castlereagh |
| Porteen (or Ballyrevagh West) | 363 | Athlone | Dysart | Athlone |
| Porteen (or Ballyrevagh) | 305 | Athlone | Dysart | Athlone |
| Portnacrinnaght | 144 | Frenchpark | Kilnamanagh | Boyle |
| Portnahinch | 152 | Ballintober South | Cloontuskert | Roscommon |
| Portnick | 122 | Moycarn | Creagh | Ballinasloe |
| Portobello | 474 | Frenchpark | Creeve | Carrick on Shannon |
| Portrunny | 10 | Athlone | Kilmeane | Roscommon |
| Powellshill | 59 | Boyle | Tumna | Carrick on Shannon |
| Quiltinan | 67 | Athlone | Fuerty | Roscommon |
| Rabbit Island | 1 | Ballintober North | Termonbarry | Strokestown |
| Rabbitburrow | 114 | Castlereagh | Kiltullagh | Castlereagh |
| Rabradagh | 166 | Ballymoe | Oran | Roscommon |
| Rackans | 178 | Athlone | Cam | Athlone |
| Raghrabeg | 1,172 | Moycarn | Moore | Ballinasloe |
| Rahara | 617 | Athlone | Rahara | Roscommon |
| Rahardagh | 332 | Castlereagh | Baslick | Castlereagh |
| Raheely | 350 | Frenchpark | Tibohine | Castlereagh |
| Raheen | 204 | Roscommon | Elphin | Strokestown |
| Rampark | 52 | Castlereagh | Kilkeevin | Castlereagh |
| Ranelagh | 71 | Athlone | St. Peter's | Athlone |
| Ranelagh | 71 | Ballintober South | Roscommon | Roscommon |
| Rat Island | 1 | Ballintober North | Kilmore | Carrick on Shannon |
| Ratallen | 718 | Frenchpark | Kilcolagh | Boyle |
| Ratawragh | 148 | Athlone | Kiltoom | Athlone |
| Rathardeagher | 90 | Frenchpark | Creeve | Carrick on Shannon |
| Rathbarna | 183 | Castlereagh | Kilkeevin | Castlereagh |
| Rathbrennan | 315 | Ballintober South | Roscommon | Roscommon |
| Rathcarran | 121 | Ballymoe | Drumatemple | Castlereagh |
| Rathconor | 1,045 | Ballintober South | Kilbride | Roscommon |
| Rathdiveen | 102 | Boyle | Ardcarn | Boyle |
| Rathdiveen | 91 | Boyle | Kilbryan | Boyle |
| Rathevin | 62 | Ballintober North | Kilmore | Carrick on Shannon |
| Rathfuadagh | 337 | Castlereagh | Baslick | Castlereagh |
| Rathkeery | 332 | Frenchpark | Tibohine | Castlereagh |
| Rathkeva | 202 | Roscommon | Ogulla | Strokestown |
| Rathkineely | 276 | Castlereagh | Kilcorkey | Castlereagh |
| Rathleg | 182 | Castlereagh | Kilkeevin | Castlereagh |
| Rathlena | 342 | Castlereagh | Kiltullagh | Castlereagh |
| Rathmew | 170 | Ballymoe | Oran | Roscommon |
| Rathmore | 292 | Ballintober South | Kilbride | Roscommon |
| Rathmore | 342 | Roscommon | Killukin | Strokestown |
| Rathmore | 262 | Roscommon | Kiltrustan | Strokestown |
| Rathmoyle | 545 | Castlereagh | Baslick | Castlereagh |
| Rathnaglye | 234 | Roscommon | Ogulla | Strokestown |
| Rathnallog | 412 | Castlereagh | Kilcorkey | Castlereagh |
| Rathnalulleagh | 334 | Castlereagh | Ballintober | Castlereagh |
| Rathnarovanagh | 182 | Ballintober North | Kilmore | Carrick on Shannon |
| Rathpeak | 761 | Moycarn | Moore | Ballinasloe |
| Rathroe | 142 | Roscommon | Shankill | Strokestown |
| Ratra | 325 | Frenchpark | Tibohine | Castlereagh |
| Rattinagh | 185 | Ballintober North | Kilglass | Strokestown |
| Raveege | 213 | Castlereagh | Ballintober | Castlereagh |
| Reagh | 163 | Roscommon | Cloonfinlough | Roscommon |
| Reycroftspark | 85 | Boyle | Ardcarn | Boyle |
| Rinanny Island | 37 | Ballintober South | Kilteevan | Roscommon |
| Rinn | 560 | Boyle | Ardcarn | Boyle |
| Rinnagan | 765 | Athlone | St. Johns | Athlone |
| Roadquarter | 70 | Castlereagh | Kiltullagh | Castlereagh |
| Robinhood (or Cloonish) | 257 | Castlereagh | Kiltullagh | Castlereagh |
| Rock | 25 | Boyle | Killukin | Carrick on Shannon |
| Rockhill | 98 | Boyle | Kilronan | Boyle |
| Rockland | 332 | Athlone | Taghmaconnell | Athlone |
| Rockville | 196 | Roscommon | Aughrim | Carrick on Shannon |
| Rodeen | 118 | Roscommon | Aughrim | Carrick on Shannon |
| Roo | 145 | Ballintober North | Kilmore | Carrick on Shannon |
| Rooaun | 142 | Moycarn | Creagh | Ballinasloe |
| Rooaun | 237 | Ballintober North | Kilglass | Strokestown |
| Rooaun Bog and Meadow | 90 | Moycarn | Creagh | Ballinasloe |
| Rooskagh | 1,252 | Athlone | St. Peter's | Athlone |
| **Roosky** | Town | Ballintober North | Termonbarry | Strokestown |
| Roosky | 490 | Frenchpark | Castlemore | Castlereagh |
| Roosky | 209 | Ballintober North | Termonbarry | Strokestown |
| Roosky New | 190 | Ballintober North | Termonbarry | Strokestown |
| Rooty | 158 | Moycarn | Moore | Ballinasloe |
| **Roscommon** | Town | Ballintober South | Roscommon | Roscommon |
| Rosmeen | 354 | Castlereagh | Ballintober | Castlereagh |
| Ross and Laragh | 736 | Ballymoe | Drumatemple | Castlereagh |
| Ross Beg | 297 | Roscommon | Elphin | Strokestown |
| Ross More East | 329 | Roscommon | Elphin | Strokestown |
| Ross More West | 250 | Roscommon | Elphin | Strokestown |
| Rover Lower | 306 | Boyle | Kilronan | Boyle |
| Rover Upper | 146 | Boyle | Kilronan | Boyle |
| Roverkilly | 222 | Athlone | Rahara | Roscommon |
| Roxborough | 1,076 | Ballintober South | Kilbride | Roscommon |
| Runnabackan | 285 | Ballymoe | Oran | Roscommon |
| Runnabehy | 328 | Frenchpark | Kilnamanagh | Castlereagh |
| Runnaboll | 322 | Frenchpark | Kilcolagh | Boyle |
| Runnacocka | 132 | Frenchpark | Kilmacumsy | Boyle |
| Runnameelta | 139 | Frenchpark | Kilnamanagh | Castlereagh |
| Runnamoat | 460 | Ballymoe | Cloonygormican | Roscommon |
| Runnaroddan | 126 | Frenchpark | Kilnamanagh | Boyle |
| Runnaroddaun | 76 | Frenchpark | Kilmacumsy | Boyle |
| Runnaruag | 148 | Frenchpark | Elphin | Strokestown |
| Runnateggal (or Ryefield) | 178 | Frenchpark | Creeve | Carrick on Shannon |
| Runnawillin (or Callow) | 632 | Frenchpark | Kilnamanagh | Castlereagh |
| Rush Hill | 68 | Boyle | Kilronan | Boyle |
| Rusheen | 379 | Boyle | Ardcarn | Boyle |
| Rusheen | 231 | Castlereagh | Baslick | Castlereagh |
| Rushpark Farragher | 208 | Ballymoe | Cloonygormican | Castlereagh |
| Rushport | 176 | Ballintober North | Kilmore | Carrick on Shannon |
| Ryefield (or Runnateggal) | 178 | Frenchpark | Creeve | Carrick on Shannon |
| Scardaun | 200 | Athlone | Athleague | Roscommon |
| Scor Beg | 233 | Frenchpark | Kilmacumsy | Boyle |
| Scor More | 212 | Frenchpark | Kilmacumsy | Boyle |
| Scrabbagh | 110 | Ballintober North | Kilmore | Carrick on Shannon |
| Scramoge | 290 | Roscommon | Bumlin | Strokestown |
| Scregg | 174 | Boyle | Killukin | Carrick on Shannon |
| Scregg | 53 | Castlereagh | Kiltullagh | Castlereagh |
| Scregg | 662 | Athlone | Killinvoy | Roscommon |
| Sedgy Island | 2 | Athlone | Kiltoom | Athlone |
| Seltannaveeny | 300 | Boyle | Kilronan | Boyle |
| Shanballybaun | 267 | Boyle | Tumna | Carrick on Shannon |
| Shanballylosky | 95 | Athlone | Taghboy | Athlone |
| Shanballymore | 88 | Ballintober South | Cloontuskert | Roscommon |
| Shankill | 365 | Roscommon | Shankill | Strokestown |
| Shankoagh | 373 | Ballymoe | Drumatemple | Castlereagh |
| Shanvoley | 25 | Boyle | Kilbryan | Boyle |
| Sheean | 94 | Athlone | Taghmaconnell | Athlone |
| Sheegeeragh | 182 | Roscommon | Killukin | Strokestown |
| Sheegorey | 716 | Boyle | Boyle | Boyle |
| Sheehaun (Hughes) | 17 | Ballintober South | Kilgefin | Roscommon |
| Sheehaun (Morton) | 172 | Ballintober South | Kilgefin | Roscommon |
| Sheepwalk | 715 | Frenchpark | Tibohine | Castlereagh |
| Sheerevagh | 225 | Frenchpark | Kilmacumsy | Boyle |
| Sheevannan | 359 | Frenchpark | Tibohine | Castlereagh |
| Skeagh | 306 | Ballintober North | Kilmore | Carrick on Shannon |
| Skeanamuck | 224 | Athlone | Taghmaconnell | Athlone |
| Skeanavart | 112 | Frenchpark | Kilmacumsy | Boyle |
| Skeavaily | 413 | Athlone | Taghmaconnell | Athlone |
| Skrine | 874 | Athlone | Kilmeane | Roscommon |
| Slattagh Beg | 175 | Ballintober North | Kilglass | Strokestown |
| Slattagh More | 865 | Ballintober North | Kilglass | Strokestown |
| Slevin | 448 | Castlereagh | Baslick | Castlereagh |
| Slevinagee | 103 | Ballintober South | Roscommon | Roscommon |
| Slieve and Corbally | 1,181 | Ballymoe | Ballynakill | Roscommon |
| Slieveroe | 220 | Frenchpark | Kilnamanagh | Castlereagh |
| Smaghraan | 178 | Ballintober South | Kilbride | Roscommon |
| Smutternagh | 363 | Boyle | Kilbryan | Boyle |
| Southpark Demesne | 763 | Castlereagh | Kilkeevin | Castlereagh |
| Spa | 257 | Boyle | Boyle | Boyle |
| Spring Gardens | 197 | Castlereagh | Kiltullagh | Castlereagh |
| Srabra | 109 | Boyle | Kilronan | Boyle |
| Srabragan | 247 | Boyle | Kilronan | Boyle |
| Sracocka | 127 | Frenchpark | Kilnamanagh | Castlereagh |
| Sraduff | 345 | Athlone | Taghmaconnell | Athlone |
| Srah | 70 | Castlereagh | Kiltullagh | Castlereagh |
| Srah | 88 | Athlone | Killinvoy | Roscommon |
| Srahauns | 127 | Athlone | Kiltoom | Athlone |
| Sralea | 204 | Moycarn | Creagh | Ballinasloe |
| Sranancoan | 119 | Boyle | Kilronan | Boyle |
| Sroankeeragh | 73 | Boyle | Tumna | Carrick on Shannon |
| Sroove | 249 | Roscommon | Killukin | Strokestown |
| Stag Island | 8 | Boyle | Boyle | Boyle |
| Steill | 291 | Roscommon | Ogulla | Strokestown |
| Stonepark | 41 | Frenchpark | Kilmacumsy | Boyle |
| Stonepark | 125 | Boyle | Kilronan | Boyle |
| Stonepark | 144 | Castlereagh | Kiltullagh | Castlereagh |
| Stonepark | 106 | Frenchpark | Tibohine | Castlereagh |
| Stonepark | 724 | Ballintober South | Roscommon | Roscommon |
| Stonepark North | 45 | Castlereagh | Kiltullagh | Castlereagh |
| Stonepark South | 85 | Castlereagh | Kiltullagh | Castlereagh |
| **Strokestown** | Town | Roscommon | Bumlin | Strokestown |
| **Strokestown** | Town | Roscommon | Kiltrustan | Strokestown |
| Suckfield | 127 | Moycarn | Creagh | Ballinasloe |
| Swallow Island | 4 | Boyle | Ardcarn | Boyle |
| Swinefield | 230 | Castlereagh | Kiltullagh | Castlereagh |
| Taduff East | 115 | Athlone | Drum | Athlone |
| Taduff West | 193 | Athlone | Drum | Athlone |
| Taghboy | 849 | Athlone | Taghboy | Athlone |
| Taghmaconnell | 728 | Athlone | Taghmaconnell | Athlone |
| Taghnarra | 647 | Castlereagh | Kilkeevin | Castlereagh |
| Taghnoose | 442 | Castlereagh | Kilkeevin | Castlereagh |
| Tansyfield | 132 | Roscommon | Elphin | Strokestown |
| Tartan | 513 | Frenchpark | Kilmacumsy | Boyle |
| Tawlaght | 154 | Boyle | Kilronan | Boyle |
| Tawlaght | 84 | Boyle | Killukin | Carrick on Shannon |
| Tawnagh | 554 | Athlone | Taghmaconnell | Athlone |
| Tawnagh More | 96 | Ballintober North | Kilmore | Carrick on Shannon |
| Tawnyneden | 147 | Boyle | Boyle | Boyle |
| Tawnyrover | 113 | Frenchpark | Tibohine | Castlereagh |
| Tawnytaskin | 232 | Boyle | Boyle | Boyle |
| Taylorstown | 171 | Athlone | Drum | Athlone |
| Teermore | 99 | Frenchpark | Kilmacumsy | Boyle |
| Teevnacreeva | 271 | Frenchpark | Tibohine | Castlereagh |
| Telton | 79 | Roscommon | Cloonfinlough | Strokestown |
| Termon | 207 | Boyle | Boyle | Boyle |
| Termon Beg | 330 | Castlereagh | Kilkeevin | Castlereagh |
| Termon More | 643 | Castlereagh | Kilkeevin | Castlereagh |
| Thomastown Demesne | 658 | Athlone | Drum | Athlone |
| Tibarney | 202 | Athlone | Tisrara | Roscommon |
| Tibohine | 305 | Frenchpark | Tibohine | Castlereagh |
| Timanagh | 403 | Castlereagh | Ballintober | Castlereagh |
| Timpaun | 136 | Boyle | Kilronan | Boyle |
| Tinacarra | 135 | Boyle | Boyle | Boyle |
| Tintagh | 473 | Boyle | Boyle | Boyle |
| Tirconnellbeg | 79 | Athlone | Dysart | Athlone |
| Tivannagh | 239 | Boyle | Boyle | Boyle |
| Toberataravan | 116 | Boyle | Tumna | Boyle |
| Toberavaddy | 302 | Athlone | Fuerty | Roscommon |
| Toberconor | 167 | Athlone | Rahara | Roscommon |
| Toberdan | 519 | Athlone | St. Johns | Athlone |
| Toberelva | 125 | Castlereagh | Baslick | Castlereagh |
| Toberiheen | 163 | Moycarn | Moore | Ballinasloe |
| Toberkeagh | 163 | Castlereagh | Ballintober | Castlereagh |
| Toberkeagh | 277 | Athlone | Athleague | Roscommon |
| Tobermacloughlin | 459 | Athlone | Taghmaconnell | Athlone |
| Tobermakee | 228 | Ballymoe | Drumatemple | Castlereagh |
| Toberpatrick | 515 | Roscommon | Kiltrustan | Strokestown |
| Toberreeoge | 71 | Athlone | Kilmeane | Roscommon |
| Toberrory | 574 | Roscommon | Elphin | Strokestown |
| Togher | 509 | Athlone | Taghmaconnell | Ballinasloe |
| Tonaknick | 36 | Frenchpark | Kilcolagh | Boyle |
| Tonalig | 464 | Moycarn | Creagh | Ballinasloe |
| Tonbaun | 294 | Ballymoe | Cloonygormican | Castlereagh |
| Tonereagh | 82 | Castlereagh | Baslick | Castlereagh |
| Tonlegee | 744 | Ballintober South | Kilbride | Roscommon |
| Tonlegee | 369 | Ballintober South | Kilteevan | Roscommon |
| Tonlemone | 147 | Moycarn | Creagh | Ballinasloe |
| Tonrevagh | 167 | Castlereagh | Kilkeevin | Castlereagh |
| Tonroe | 211 | Castlereagh | Baslick | Castlereagh |
| Tonroe (or Creen) | 306 | Frenchpark | Kilnamanagh | Boyle |
| Tonroe (or Feenagh) | 217 | Frenchpark | Kilnamanagh | Boyle |
| Tonvey | 298 | Moycarn | Moore | Ballinasloe |
| Tonycurneen | 66 | Roscommon | Lissonuffy | Strokestown |
| Tooloscan | 149 | Ballintober North | Kilmore | Carrick on Shannon |
| Toomona | 300 | Roscommon | Ogulla | Strokestown |
| Toomore | 456 | Roscommon | Aughrim | Carrick on Shannon |
| Tooreen | 75 | Roscommon | Lissonuffy | Strokestown |
| Toormore | 116 | Boyle | Killukin | Carrick on Shannon |
| Toorymartin | 92 | Boyle | Killukin | Carrick on Shannon |
| Torpan Beg | 233 | Athlone | Taghboy | Athlone |
| Torpan More | 241 | Athlone | Taghboy | Athlone |
| Tournagee | 192 | Frenchpark | Kilnamanagh | Boyle |
| Townparks | 183 | Moycarn | Creagh | Ballinasloe |
| Trean | 76 | Athlone | Kilmeane | Roscommon |
| Treanacreeve | 191 | Roscommon | Lissonuffy | Strokestown |
| Treanagry | 287 | Boyle | Estersnow | Boyle |
| Treanamarly | 260 | Boyle | Estersnow | Boyle |
| Trien | 483 | Castlereagh | Kilkeevin | Castlereagh |
| Trila (Dillon) | 318 | Roscommon | Lissonuffy | Strokestown |
| Trila (Martin) | 296 | Roscommon | Lissonuffy | Strokestown |
| Trilacroghan | 322 | Ballintober South | Kilgefin | Roscommon |
| Trinity Island | 1 | Boyle | Kilbryan | Boyle |
| **Tromaun** | Town | Athlone | Athleague | Roscommon |
| Tromaun | 716 | Athlone | Athleague | Roscommon |
| Tuam | 467 | Ballintober South | Kilgefin | Roscommon |
| Tullaghan | 317 | Frenchpark | Kilnamanagh | Boyle |
| Tullaghan | 326 | Castlereagh | Kilcorkey | Castlereagh |
| Tullen | 147 | Roscommon | Kiltrustan | Strokestown |
| Tullintuppen | 246 | Roscommon | Elphin | Strokestown |
| Tully | 204 | Moycarn | Moore | Ballinasloe |
| Tully | 255 | Ballintober North | Kilmore | Carrick on Shannon |
| Tully | 1,182 | Castlereagh | Kilcorkey | Castlereagh |
| Tully | 916 | Frenchpark | Tibohine | Castlereagh |
| Tully | 288 | Ballintober South | Kilbride | Roscommon |
| Tully | 413 | Ballintober North | Kilglass | Strokestown |
| Tullyboy | 166 | Boyle | Estersnow | Boyle |
| Tullycarton | 114 | Roscommon | Elphin | Strokestown |
| Tullyleague | 96 | Boyle | Tumna | Carrick on Shannon |
| Tullyloyd | 218 | Roscommon | Elphin | Strokestown |
| Tullynahaw | 482 | Boyle | Kilronan | Boyle |
| Tullynahearka | 82 | Roscommon | Aughrim | Carrick on Shannon |
| Tullyneeny | 182 | Athlone | Taghboy | Athlone |
| Tullyroe | 149 | Athlone | Kilmeane | Roscommon |
| Tullytawen | 681 | Boyle | Kilronan | Boyle |
| Tullyval | 156 | Boyle | Ardcarn | Boyle |
| Tullyvarran | 455 | Roscommon | Lissonuffy | Strokestown |
| Tullyvohaun | 244 | Boyle | Estersnow | Boyle |
| Tulrush | 208 | Moycarn | Creagh | Ballinasloe |
| **Tulsk** | Town | Roscommon | Ogulla | Strokestown |
| Tulsk | 76 | Roscommon | Ogulla | Strokestown |
| Tumna | 182 | Boyle | Tumna | Carrick on Shannon |
| Turkisland | 117 | Ballymoe | Oran | Roscommon |
| Turlagh | 17 | Boyle | Ardcarn | Boyle |
| Turlagh | 59 | Frenchpark | Creeve | Carrick on Shannon |
| Turlagh | 249 | Athlone | Rahara | Roscommon |
| Turlagharee | 121 | Frenchpark | Tibohine | Castlereagh |
| Turlaghmore | 250 | Athlone | Taghmaconnell | Athlone |
| Turlaghnamaddy | 78 | Frenchpark | Tibohine | Castlereagh |
| Turrock | 699 | Athlone | Taghboy | Athlone |
| Urrasaun | 228 | Frenchpark | Tibohine | Castlereagh |
| Usna | 201 | Boyle | Tumna | Boyle |
| Vesnoy | 189 | Roscommon | Bumlin | Strokestown |
| Warren | 121 | Athlone | St. Johns | Athlone |
| Warren (or Drum) | 581 | Boyle | Boyle | Boyle |
| Willsborough | 217 | Castlereagh | Kiltullagh | Castlereagh |
| Willsbrook | 465 | Castlereagh | Kilkeevin | Castlereagh |
| Willsgrove | 711 | Castlereagh | Ballintober | Castlereagh |
| Windmillpark (or Chanterland) | 103 | Roscommon | Elphin | Strokestown |
| Woodbrook | 354 | Boyle | Tumna | Carrick on Shannon |
| Woodfield | 284 | Boyle | Ardcarn | Boyle |
| Yellow Island Large | 1 | Athlone | Kiltoom | Athlone |
| Yellow Island Little | 1 | Athlone | Kiltoom | Athlone |
