= Athlone North =

Athlone North Baile Átha Luain Thuaidh (Irish)
- Barony
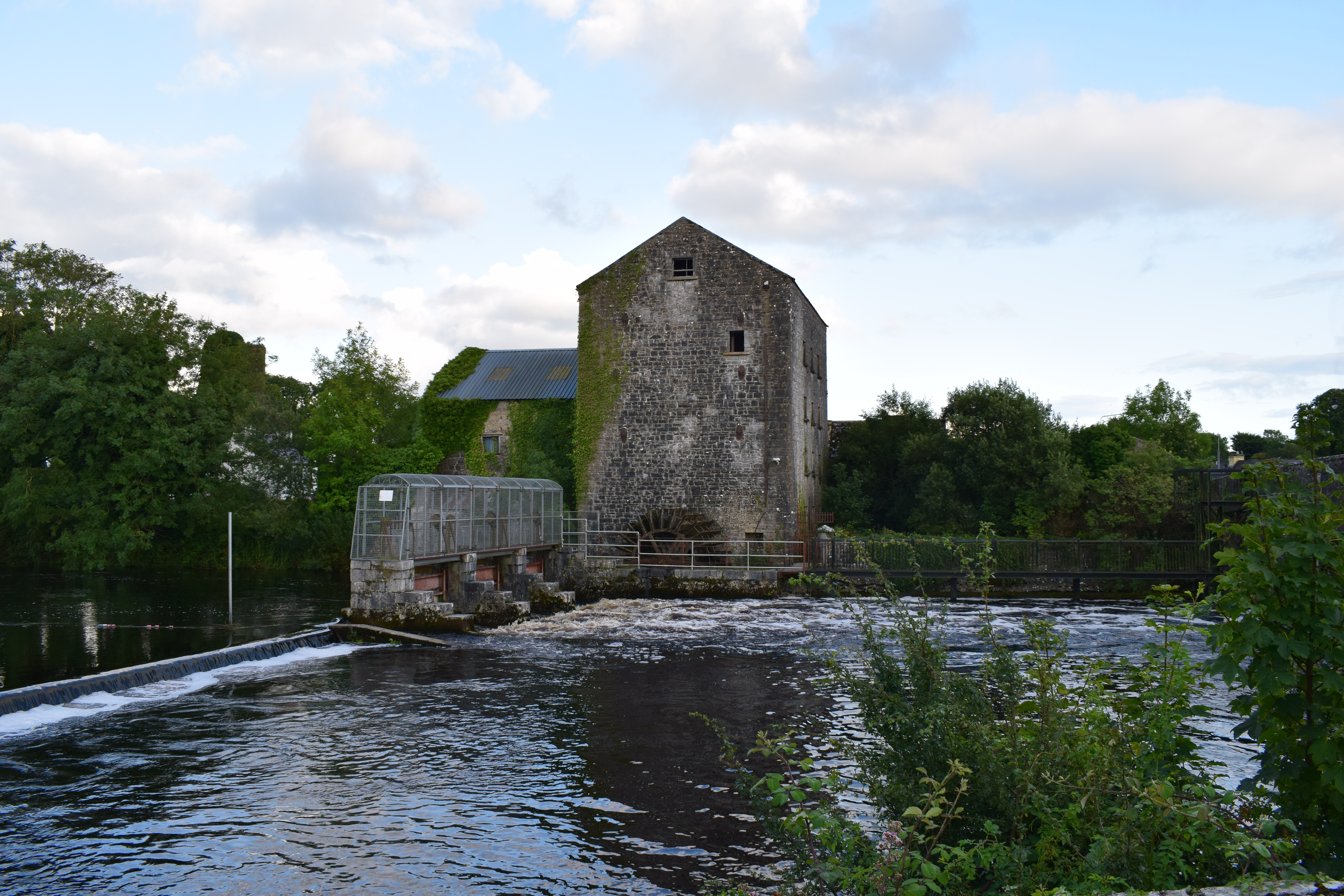
- Athleague mill in the barony of Athlone North

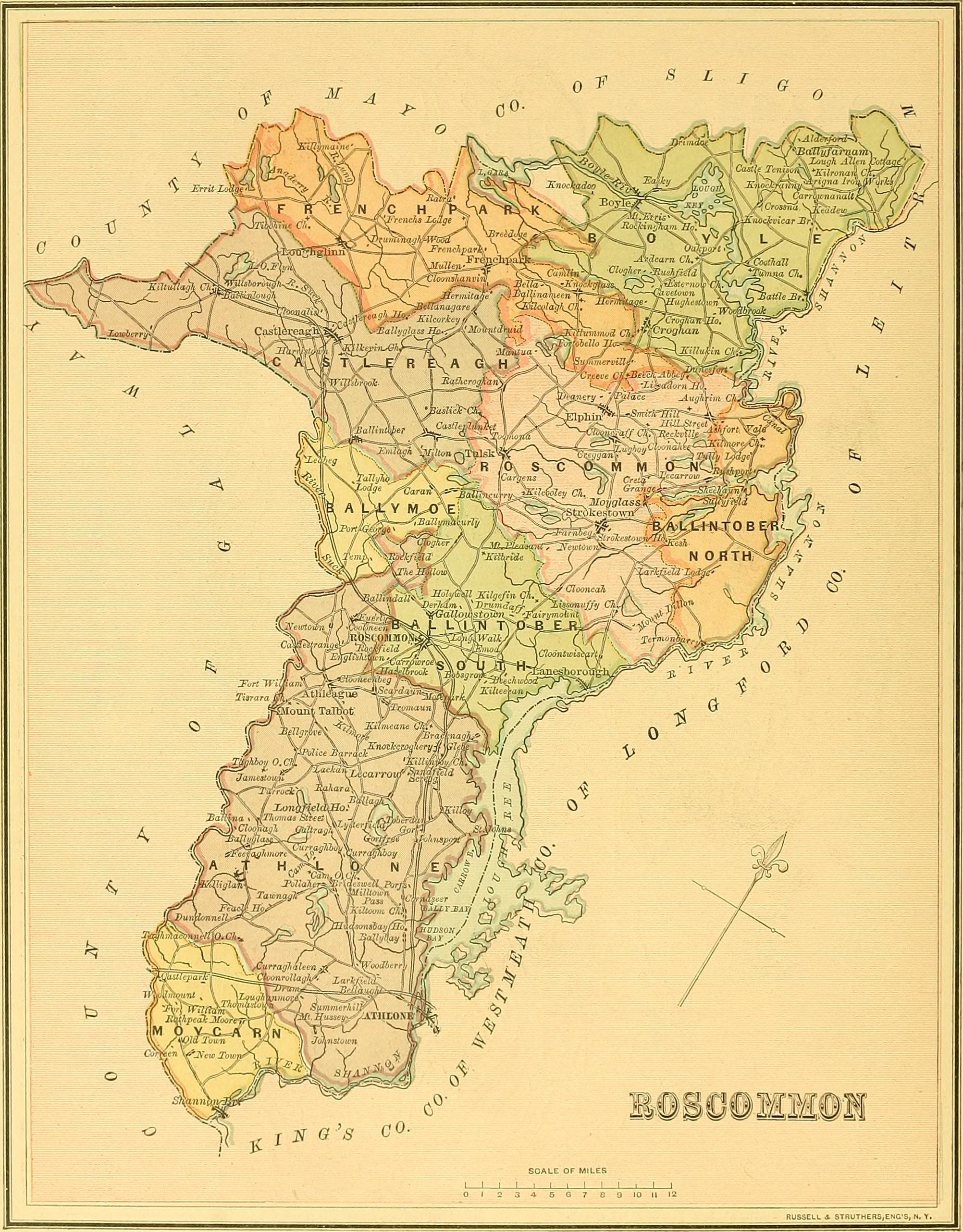
- Barony map of County Roscommon, 1900; Athlone barony is in the south, coloured purple, undivided.
- Sovereign state: Ireland
- Province: Connacht
- County: Roscommon

Area
  - Total: 234.16 km^{2} (90.41 sq mi)

Athlone North (Irish: Baile Átha Luain Thuaidh), also called North Athlone, is a barony in County Roscommon, Ireland. Baronies were mainly cadastral rather than administrative units. They acquired modest local taxation and spending functions in the 19th century before being superseded by the Local Government (Ireland) Act 1898.

== Etymology ==
Athlone North is named after Athlone town; however, it does not actually contain that town, which is located in Brawny barony, County Westmeath.

== Geography ==
Athlone North is located in the centre of County Roscommon, bounded by the River Shannon and Lough Ree to the east and the River Suck to the west.

== History ==
It was originally a single barony with Athlone South; they were separated by 1868.

Athlone barony was anciently ruled by the Ó Ceallaigh (O'Kellys), princes of Uí Maine. The Ó Fallúin (O'Fallons) were also a powerful family. It was created from the early medieval cantred of Tyrmany (Tír Maine), and by 1585 it was known as 'O'Kelly's Country'. By the 18th and 19th centuries, it was the seat of the Kellys, Mitchells and Cootes.

== List of settlements ==
Below is a list of settlements in Athlone North:

- Athleague
- Castlecoote
- Four Roads
- Knockcroghery
- Rahara
