= Athlone South =

Athlone South Baile Átha Luain Theas (Irish)
- Barony
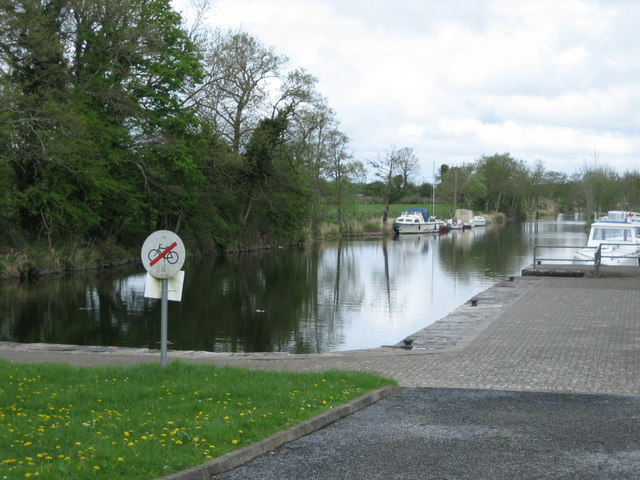
- Lecarrow

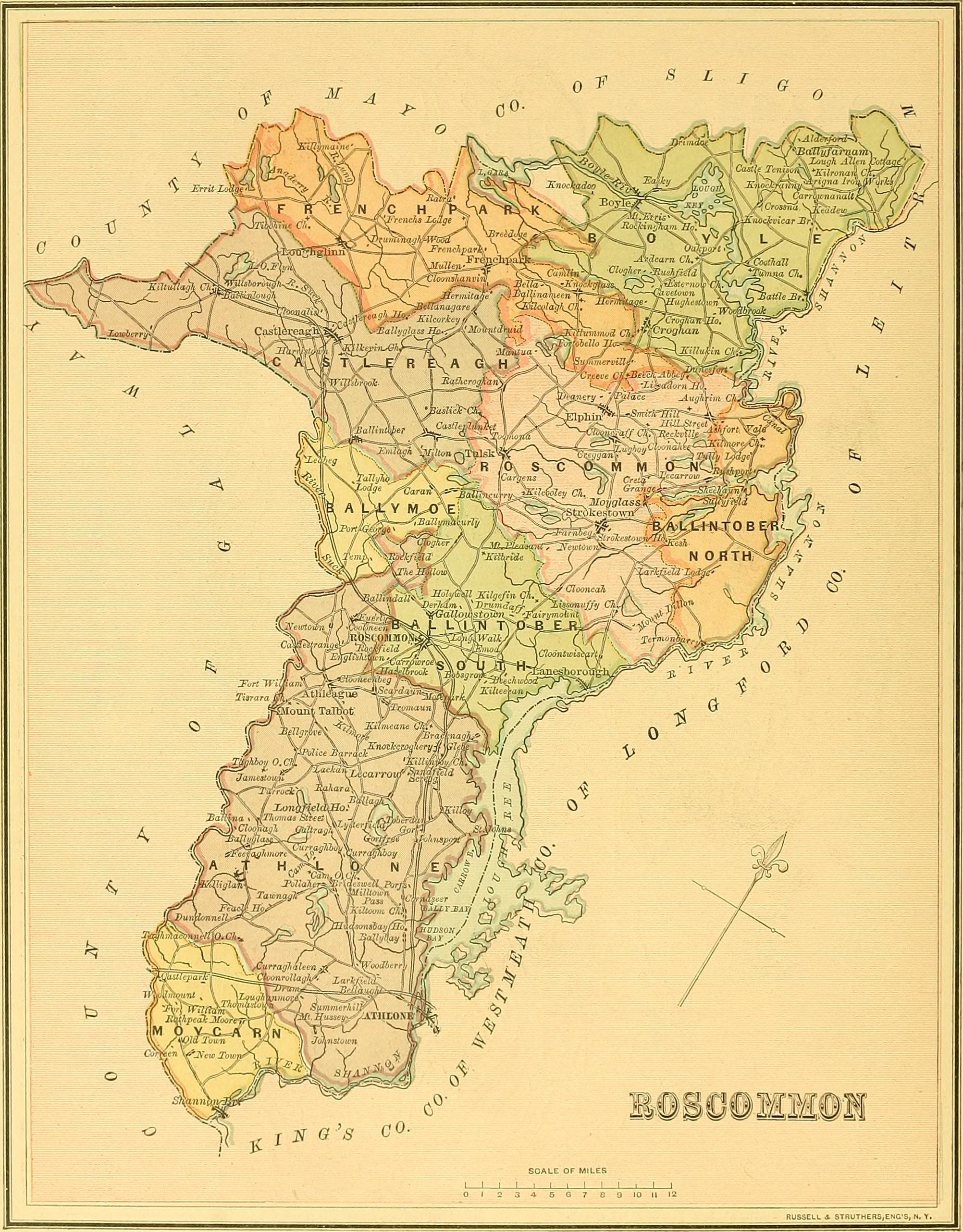
- Barony map of County Roscommon, 1900; Athlone barony is in the south, coloured purple, undivided.
- Sovereign state: Ireland
- Province: Connacht
- County: Roscommon

Area
  - Total: 322.37 km^{2} (124.47 sq mi)

Athlone South (Irish: Baile Átha Luain Theas), also called South Athlone, is a barony in County Roscommon, Ireland. Baronies were mainly cadastral rather than administrative units. They acquired modest local taxation and spending functions in the 19th century before being superseded by the Local Government (Ireland) Act 1898.

== Etymology ==
Athlone South is named after Athlone town; it contains the western portion of the town, west of the River Shannon, although part of it (seven townlands) has been transferred to County Westmeath.

== Geography ==
Athlone South is located in the south of County Roscommon, bounded by the River Shannon and Lough Ree to the east and the River Suck to the west.

== History ==
It was originally a single barony with Athlone North; they were separated by 1868.

Athlone barony was anciently ruled by the Ó Ceallaigh (O'Kellys), princes of Uí Maine. The Ó Fallúin (O'Fallons) were also a powerful family. It was created from the early medieval cantred of Tyrmany (Tír Maine), and by 1585 it was known as O'Kelly's Country. By the 18th and 19th centuries, it was the seat of the Kellys, Mitchells and Cootes.

== List of settlements ==
Below is a list of settlements in Athlone South:

- Athlone (western part)
- Bellanamullia
- Brideswell
- Cornafulla
- Curraghboy
- Dysart
- Kiltoom
- Lecarrow
- Taghmaconnell
