= Kiltivna =

Townland in County Galway, Ireland

Coordinates: 53.6541°N 8.6798°W

Kiltivna (Irish: Cill tSuibhne, meaning 'Sweeny's church'), also spelled Kiltevna, is a townland in the civil parish of Dunmore in County Galway, Ireland. It is located between the towns of Dunmore and Glenamaddy. The townland, which is 0.78 kilometres (0.48 mi) in area, had a population of 33 people as of the 2011 census.

Evidence of ancient settlement in the townland include several ringfort sites, a ruined medieval church and a graveyard. Some sources associate the ruined church with Saint Patrick. The current Catholic church in Kiltivna, which is dedicated to Christ the King, was built c. 1850. Other local amenities include a hardware store, a garage and a public house.
