= Rahara, Ireland =

Village in County Roscommon, Ireland

Rahara Ráth Ara
- Village
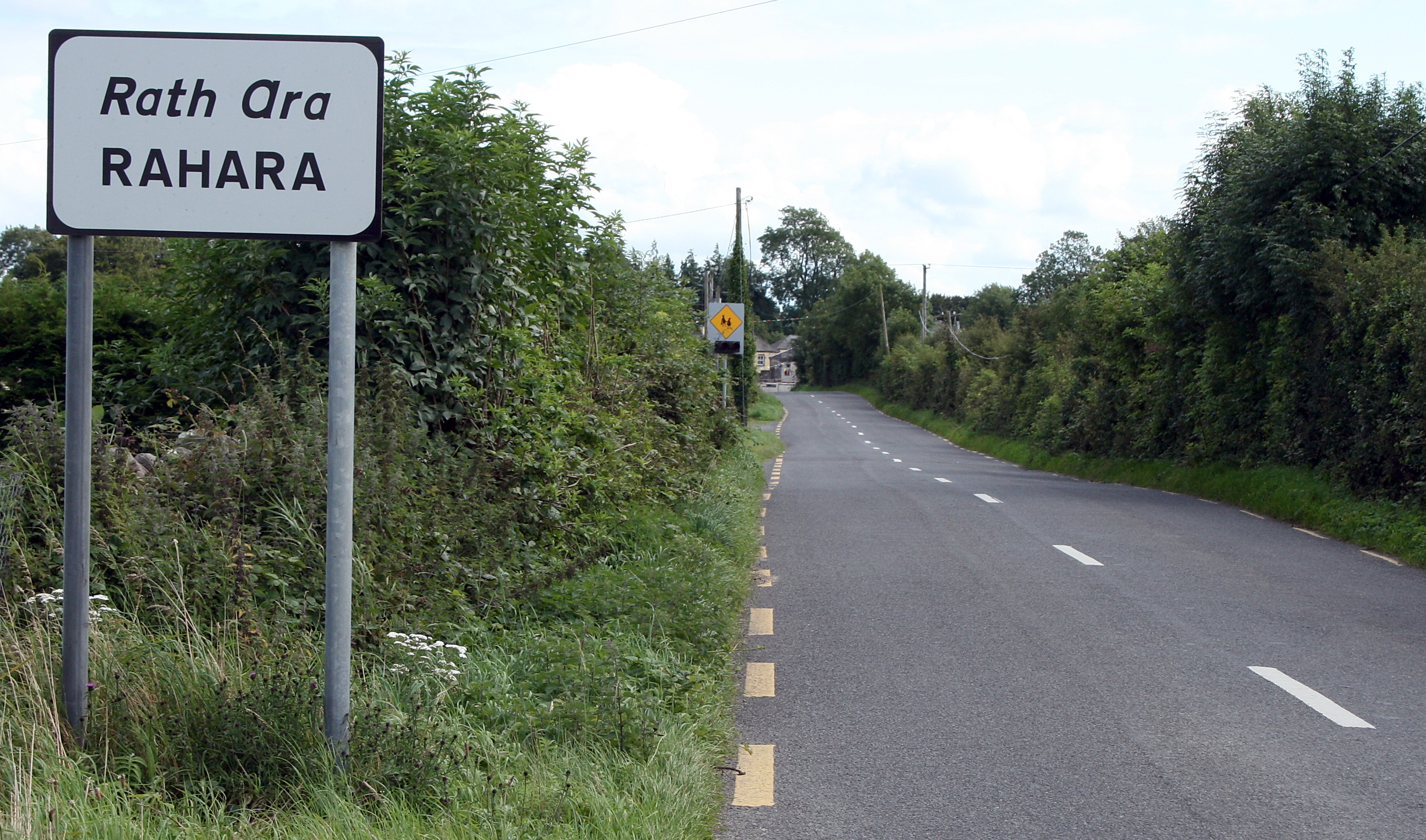
- Rahara on the R362

- Location in Ireland
- Coordinates: 53°31′16″N 8°08′24″W
- Country: Ireland
- Province: Connacht
- County: County Roscommon
- Time zone: UTC+0 (WET)
  - Summer (DST): UTC-1 (IST (WEST))

Rahara (Irish: Ráth Ara, meaning 'fort of the charioteer') is a village in County Roscommon, Ireland. It lies on the R362 regional road, between Athlone and Athleague about 3 km (1.9 mi) north of the village of Curraghboy. Rahara is in a townland and civil parish of the same name.

As of December 2011, the local primary school, Rahara National School, had an enrollment of 34 children. The Roman Catholic church in Rahara, the Church of Mary Immaculate, is in the combined parish of Knockcroghery, St. John's and Rahara of the Diocese of Elphin.

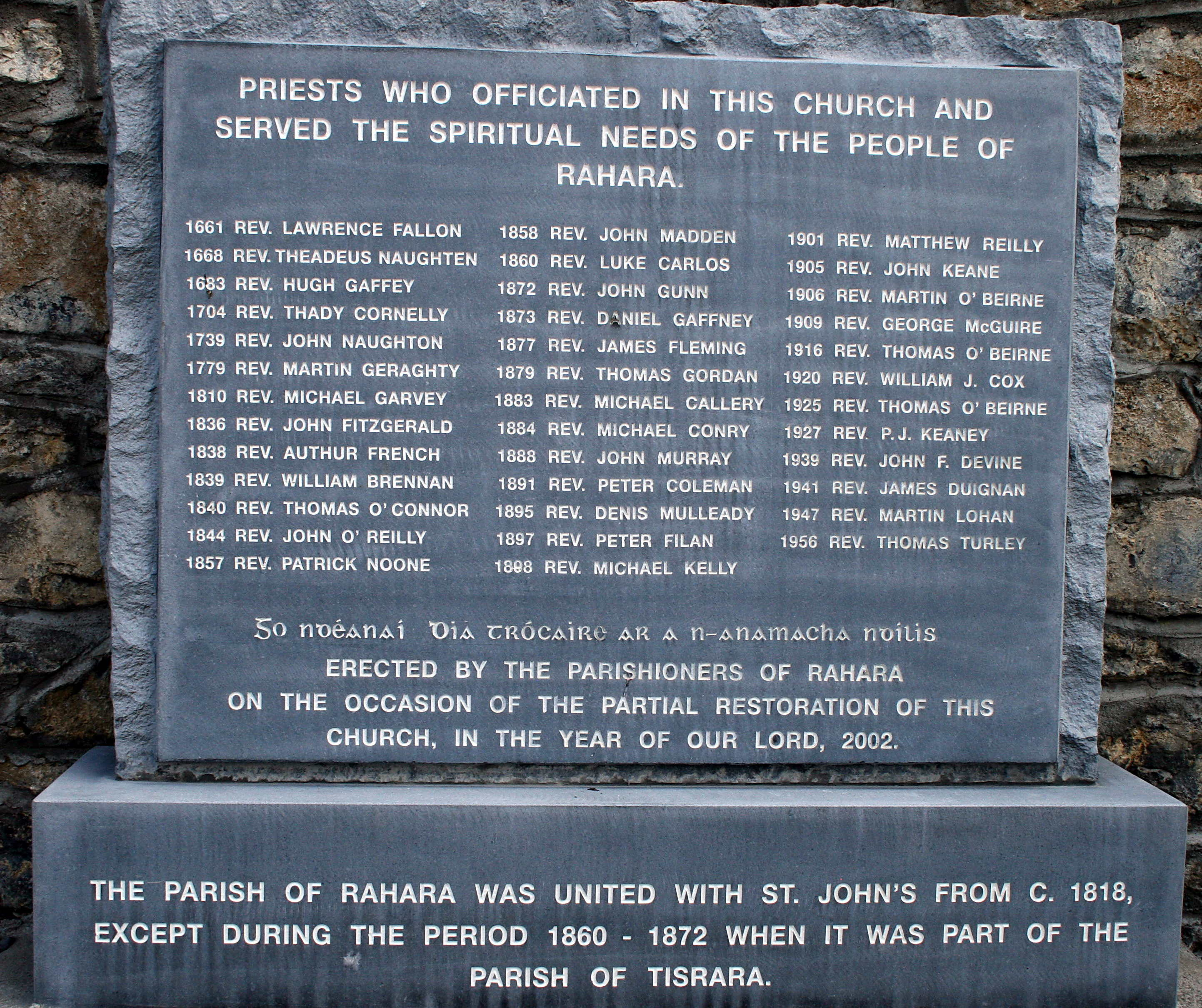
Commemorative stone listing former Catholic priests in Rahara

== See also ==
- List of towns and villages in Ireland
