= Ballymoe (County Galway barony) =

Land unit in County Galway, Ireland

Ballymoe Béal Átha Mó (Irish)
- Barony
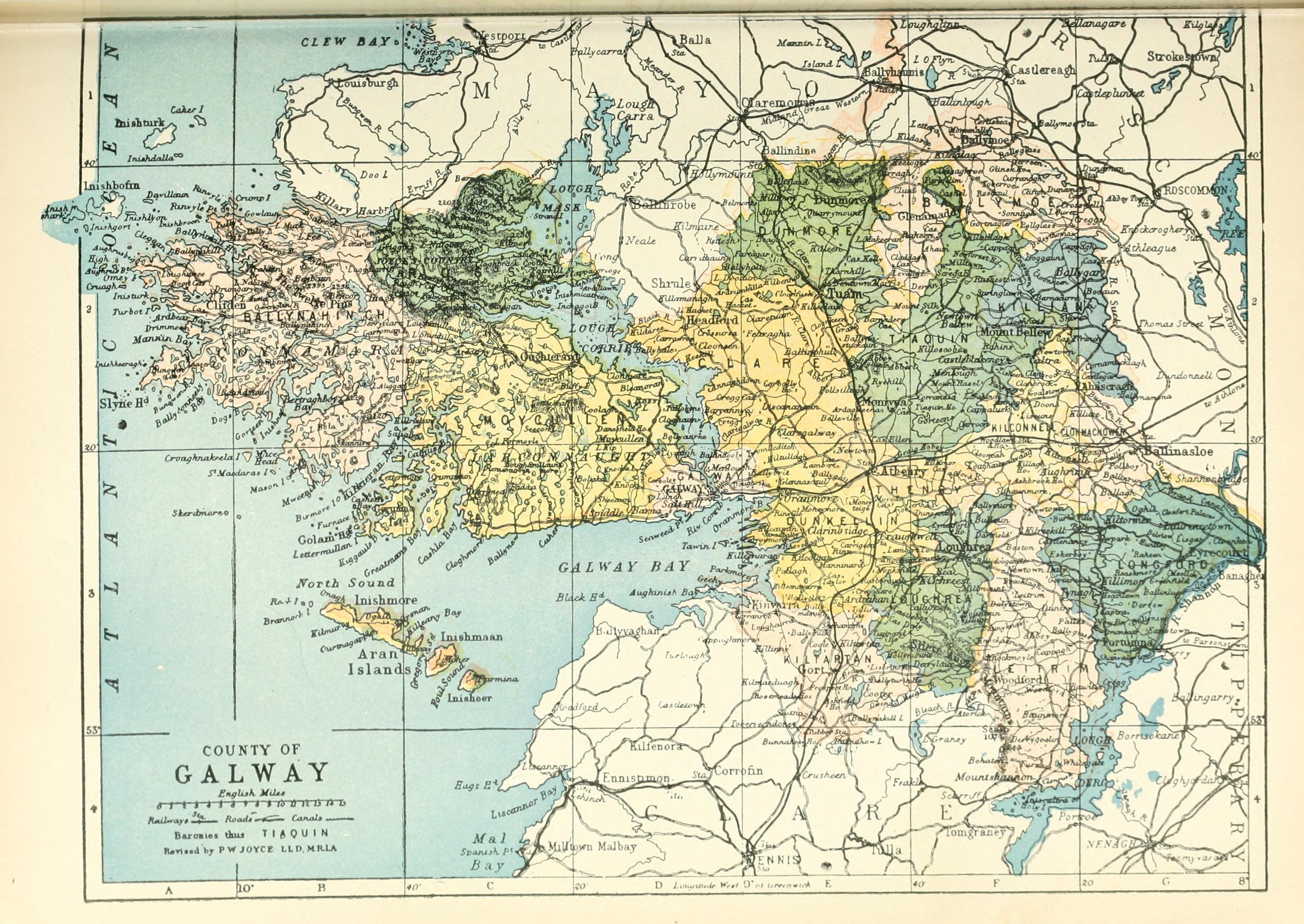
- Barony map of County Galway, 1900; Ballymoe is coloured pink, in the northeast.
- Sovereign state: Ireland
- Province: Connacht
- County: Galway

Area
  - Total: 361.26 km^{2} (139.48 sq mi)

Ballymoe (Irish: Béal Átha Mó) is a barony in County Galway, Ireland.

== Etymology ==
Ballymoe barony is named after Ballymoe town, County Galway; the name means "mouth of the ford of Mogh"; Mogh is a legendary figure linked to Queen Medb.

== Geography ==
Ballymoe barony is located in the northeast of County Galway.

== History ==
The O'Finnachta (O'Feenaghty) were chiefs in Ballymoe.

== Population centres ==
- Ballymoe
- Boyounagh
- Creggs
- Glenamaddy
- Kilsallagh
- Williamstown
