= Coalpits, County Galway =

Townland in County Galway, Ireland

Coalpits
- Townland
- Location in Ireland
- Coordinates: 53°35′38″N 8°22′42″W
- Country: Ireland
- Province: Connacht
- County: County Galway

Area
  - Total: 1.56 km^{2} (0.60 sq mi)
- Time zone: UTC+0 (WET)
  - Summer (DST): UTC-1 (IST (WEST))

Coalpits or sometimes Coal Pits is a townland of 386 acres in Athleague parish, in Killeroran district, in the Killian barony, the Union of Mountbellew, in County Galway, Ireland. Coalpits, which is known in Irish as Clais an Ghuail, is adjacent to the town of Hollygrove.

== Griffiths Valuation ==
Griffith's valuation lists the following people in Coalpits who leased the land they farmed from James Thewles:

- Brennan, Thomas
- Conran, Mary
- Patrick Corboy [sic] a.k.a. Patrick Conboy
- Cunniffe, Thomas
- Dignan, Peter
- Farrisy, Michael
- Gavan, Michael
- Gouran, Edmund
- Gouran, Patrick
- Gouran, Thomas
- Harraghtin, Patrick
- Kelly, Catherine
- Lohan, Patrick
- Murphy, Michael
- Ryan, Michael
