= Hollygrove, County Galway =

Hollygrove Garrán an Chuilinn
- Townland
- Location in Ireland
- Coordinates: 53°33′56″N 8°20′12″W
- Country: Ireland
- Province: Connacht
- County: County Galway

Area
  - Total: 1.14 km^{2} (0.44 sq mi)
- Time zone: UTC+0 (WET)
  - Summer (DST): UTC-1 (IST (WEST))

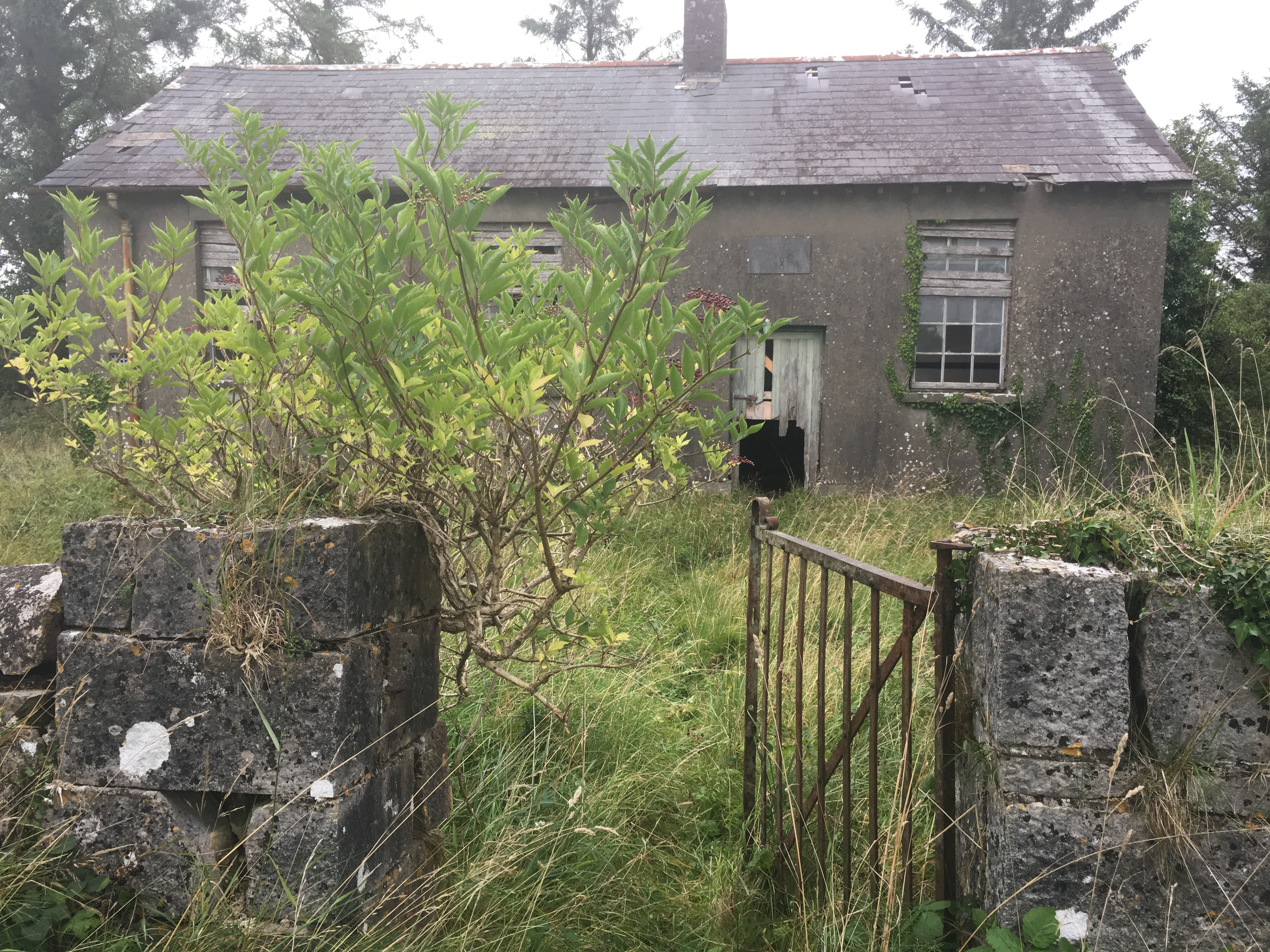

Hollygrove or sometimes Holly Grove (Irish: Garrán an Chuilinn) is a townland of 283 acres in Athleague parish, Killeroran district, Killian barony, Union of Mountbellew, in County Galway, Ireland. Hollygrove is adjacent to the townland of Coalpits and is on the border of counties Roscommon and Galway.

== Hollygrove Lake ==
Hollygrove Lake is a 50-acre (200,000 m^{2}) lake located between Ballygar and Athleague, downstream of Rookwood Bridge on the River Suck system. It is within half a kilometre of the main River Suck. The lake is shallow, typically 5 feet (1.5 m) deep with two deeper channels. It is primarily stocked with tench and pike.

== Griffiths Primary Valuation ==
Griffith's valuation between 1848 and 1864, lists the following people in Hollygrove who leased the land they farmed:

- Patrick Byrne
- John Droody
- James Feeney
- John Gouran
- Luke Hannelly
- John Hogan (1828-1886) who married Winifred Conboy (1827-?)
- Bernard Kelly
- Thomas Kerin
- Hannelly Leonard
- Michael Leonard
- Thomas Moran
- Patrick Reilly
- John Torpy
