= Drum, County Roscommon =

Drum An Droim
- Settlement
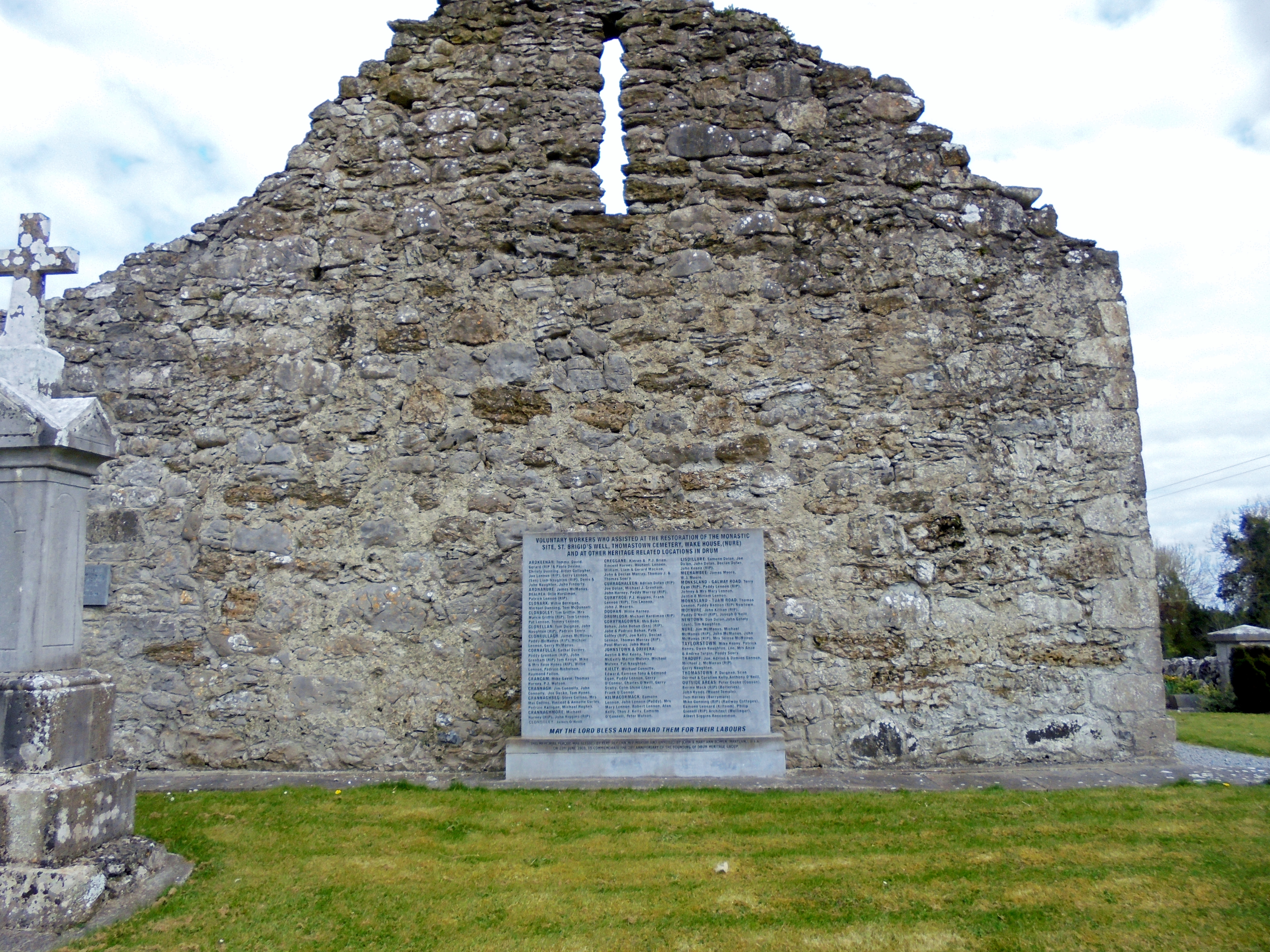
- Ruins at Drum Monastic Site

- Location in Ireland
- Coordinates: 53°24′05″N 8°00′50″W
- Country: Ireland
- Province: Connacht
- County: County Roscommon
- Time zone: UTC+0 (WET)
  - Summer (DST): UTC-1 (IST (WEST))
- Website: www.drum.ie

Drum (Irish: An Droim, meaning 'the ridge') is a civil parish in south County Roscommon about 5 km west of Athlone. It lies in the barony of Athlone. One of the townlands in the parish is also called Drum. Meehambee Dolmen, a portal tomb estimated to be 5,500 years old, is located in the northern part of the parish. In the village there are a number of historical and religious sites, including Drum Cemetery, St. Brigid's Church and Drum Monastic Site. Drum Parish Hall and Drum Heritage Visitor Centre are located next to the graveyard, in the townland of Belrea.

== Mount Florence ==
In the 1650s Melchior Moore was transplanted from Cregganstown, County Meath, to the parish of Drum, and his title to over 700 acres in the parish was confirmed by patent dated 24 Apr 1677. Melchior's son John Moore was an astute businessman and besides being a merchant in Dublin built up an estate in the parish of Drum through inheritance and acquisition. In 1723, following the death of John Moore, grandson of Melchior, the estate passed to his four sisters, one of whom, Mary, in 1725 married James Sullivan or O'Sullivan of Dublin. They had one son John, who had 3 sons James, Patrick and John.

In the early 1760s the descendants of the four sisters decided to divide the lands formally. The O'Sullivans took an estate known as the Whitehouse (later Mount Florence), which now lies on the R446 due south of Mount William, between Carrickynaghton, Taylorstown and Mount Hussey. On 23 December 1778 John O'Sullivan of Whitehouse swore an oath of allegiance to the King. Mount Florence descended to John O'Sullivan in 1823 upon his father dying young; his mother remarried Dr William O'Reilly of County Meath and they continued to live in the O'Sullivan Roscommon residence, then known as 'Whitehouse'. In 1855, when John O'Sullivan was in financial difficulties, Mount Florence was advertised for sale but the family retained it. In the 1870s the estate was of 1,489 acres. John O'Sullivan died there in 1874. His estate containing parts of Carrickynaghten, Garrynagowna and Carrickynaghten & Garrynagowna Bog was advertised for sale on 6 Feb 1883 by his widow, and by his son Raphael O'Sullivan, and was sold to the Greene family from the Ballinasloe area. It is now a ruin.

== Drum today ==
Drum was the birthplace of Fr James Coyle (1873-1921), who was murdered by the Ku Klux Klan in Birmingham, Alabama on 11 August 1921.

The railway line between Athlone and Athenry passes through the parish, as does the M6 motorway. The village of Cornafulla lies within the civil parish of Drum.

Drum surrounds the civil parish of St. Peters.

== See also ==
- List of towns and villages in Ireland
