= R366 road (Ireland) =

Road in Ireland

R366 road
- Bóthar R366
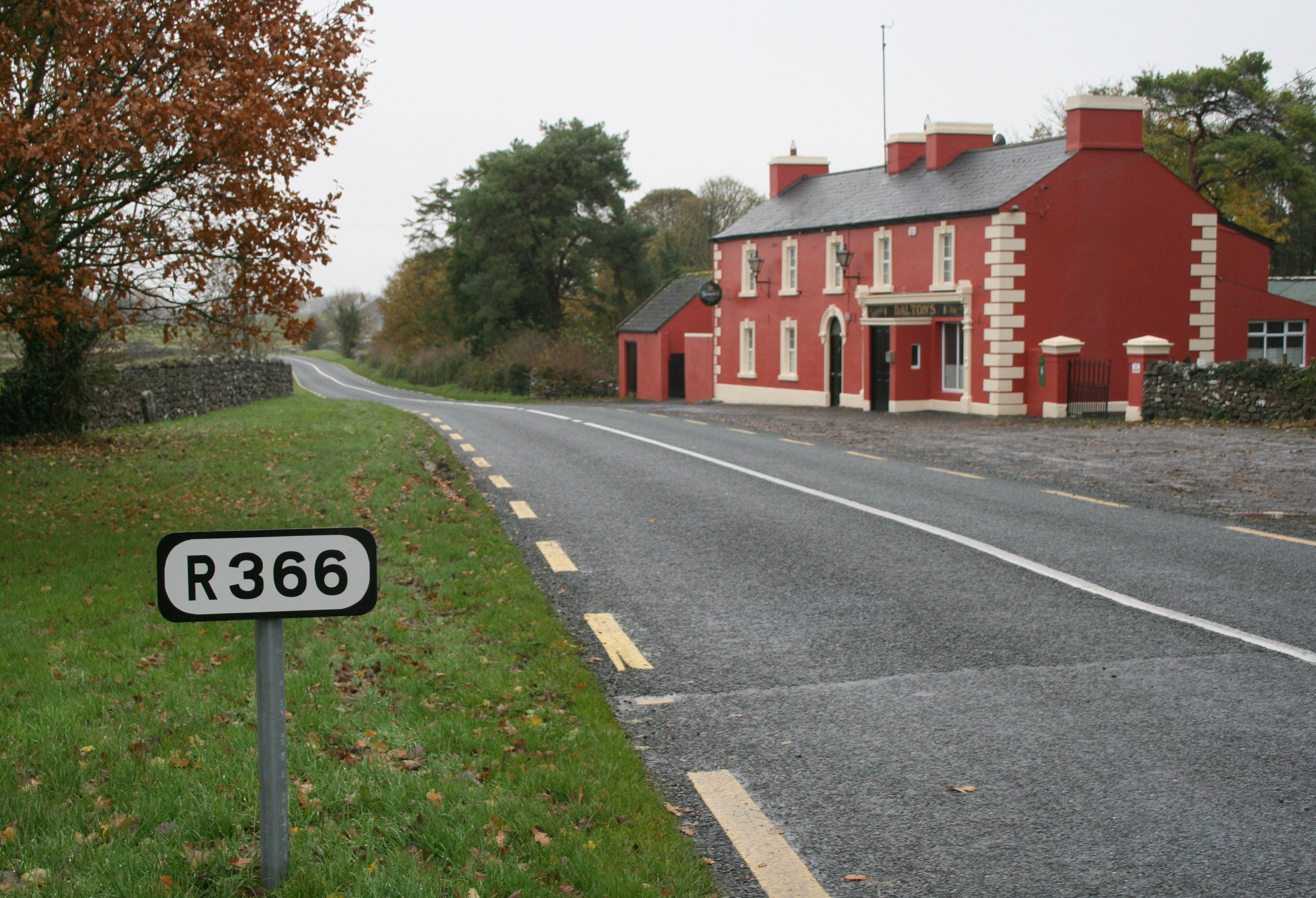
- R366 at Fuerty

Route information
- Length: 9 km (5.6 mi)

Location
- Country: Ireland
- Primary destinations: County Roscommon; Starts at junction with the R362; Castlecoote; Fuerty; Crosses the Athlone - Westport railway line; Roscommon – Terminates at the N63 at a roundabout junction on the town ring-road.

Highway system
- Roads in Ireland; Motorways; Primary; Secondary; Regional

The R366 road is a regional road in Ireland linking R362 regional road to the N63 national secondary road in Roscommon Town. It passes through the hamlets of Castlecoote and Fuerty en route. The road is 9 km (5.6 mi) long and is located entirely in County Roscommon.

== See also ==
- Roads in Ireland
- National primary road
- National secondary road
