= St. Peters, County Roscommon =

St. Peters
- Civil parish
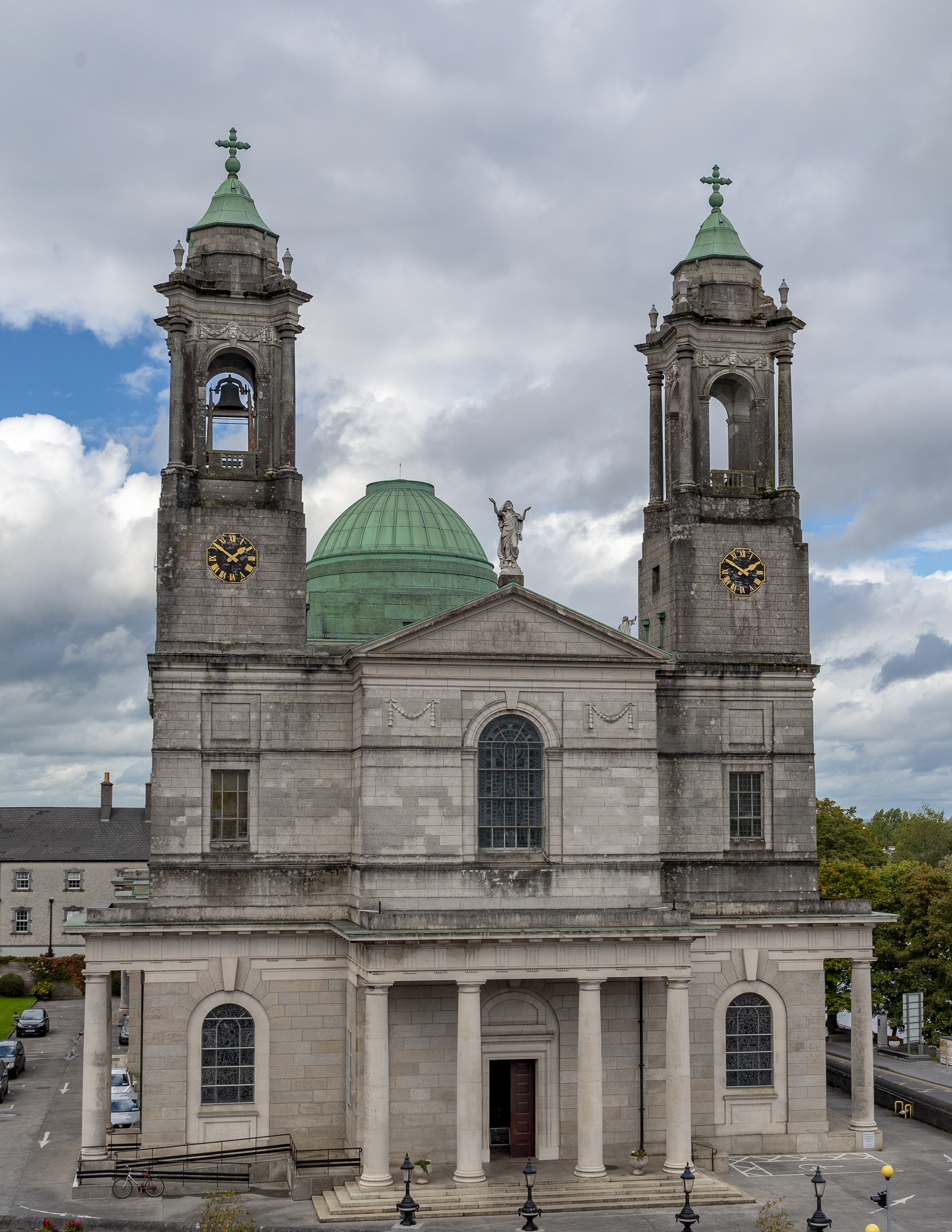
- Church of Saints Peter and Paul

- Location of St. Peters in Ireland
- Coordinates: 53°25′26″N 7°57′52″W
- Country: Ireland
- Province: Connacht
- County: County Roscommon

St. Peters is a civil parish in County Roscommon, with a small number of townlands in County Westmeath, Ireland. It is located in south-east County Roscommon.

St. Peters lies in the barony of Athlone.

The townlands in St Peters are: Banks, Bellanamullia, Bellaugh, Bogganfin, Bunnaribba, Canal and Banks, Cartron, Cloonakille, Cloonown, Doovoge, Killnamanagh, Long Island, Long Island (Little), Monksland, Rooskagh, Athlone and Bigmeadow, Ranelagh.

The neighbouring civil parishes are: St. Mary's to the east, and Drum to the north, south and west.
