= Castlecoote =

Castlecoote Bhaile Mhic Oireachtaigh
- Townland
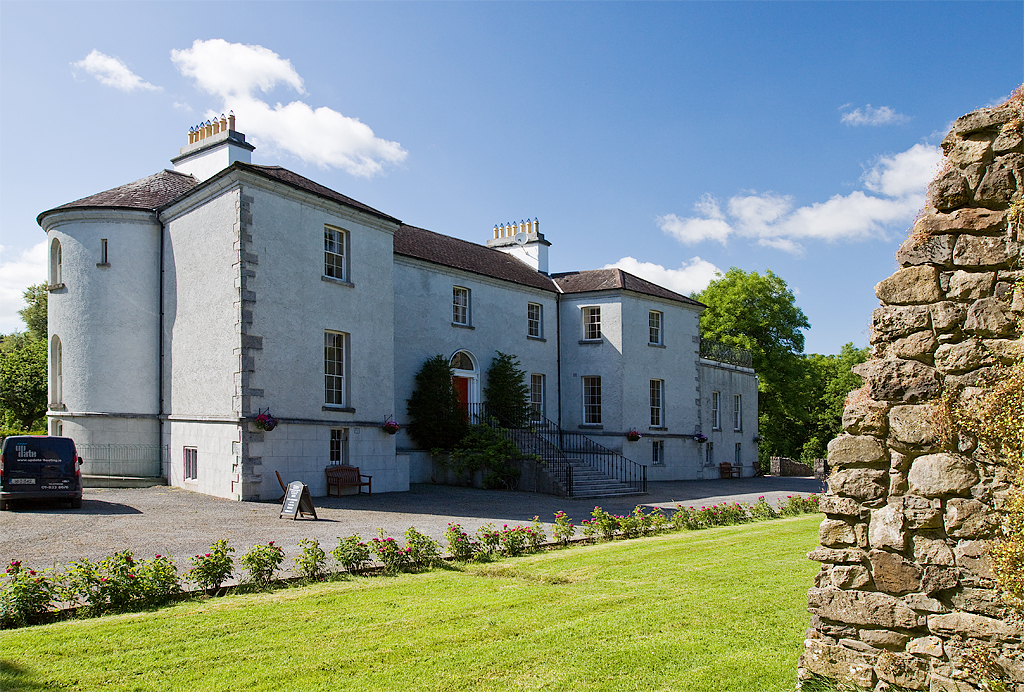
- Castlecoote house

- Location in Ireland
- Country: Ireland
- Province: Connacht
- County: County Roscommon
- Named for: Coote Family
- Time zone: WET
  - Summer (DST): IST (WEST)

Castlecoote (otherwise known in Irish: Bhaile Mhic Oireachtaigh) is a townland within the civil parish of Fuerty on the R366 regional road near the town of Roscommon in County Roscommon, Ireland. Castlecoote is known for Castlecoote house and the ruins of a much older castle. Wrapping around the grounds of Castlecoote House, the River Suck is a popular destination for trout and coarse angling.

== History ==
The name Castlecoote originates from Sir Charles Coote, a figure during the 1641 rebellion who resided in a fortified residence on the site. Today, the village remains largely centered around farming, agricultural activities and tourism on the Suck Valley Way.

=== Castlecoote House ===
Castlecoote House stands on the grounds of a former stronghold that dates back to the late 16th or early 17th century. Originally linked to the MacGeraghty clan of Fuerty, the site was later reinforced in 1616 after being granted to Sir Charles Coote. During the 1640s, it came under repeated assault, facing three separate attacks by Irish Confederates.

Set within the remains of an earlier fortified structure, the current house was added long after the original castle fell into decay. Defensive features are present, such as gun loops in the basement towers aimed toward the entrance. In the 1700s, the estate came under the ownership of the Gunning family, whose daughters gained widespread attention for their striking appearance. Later, in the 1900s, the house became the residence of Henry D. Strevens, a horseman. By the time it changed hands again in 1997 it was in a state of neglect, since then the new owner undertook a full restoration.

== Culture ==
The town is situated in the Roman Catholic Diocese of Elphin and is served by a church in the village. There are several pubs in the vicinity as well as the Castlecoote stores and a disused stone mill. The village has been awarded a category A gold medal at the 2019 Tidy Towns competition.

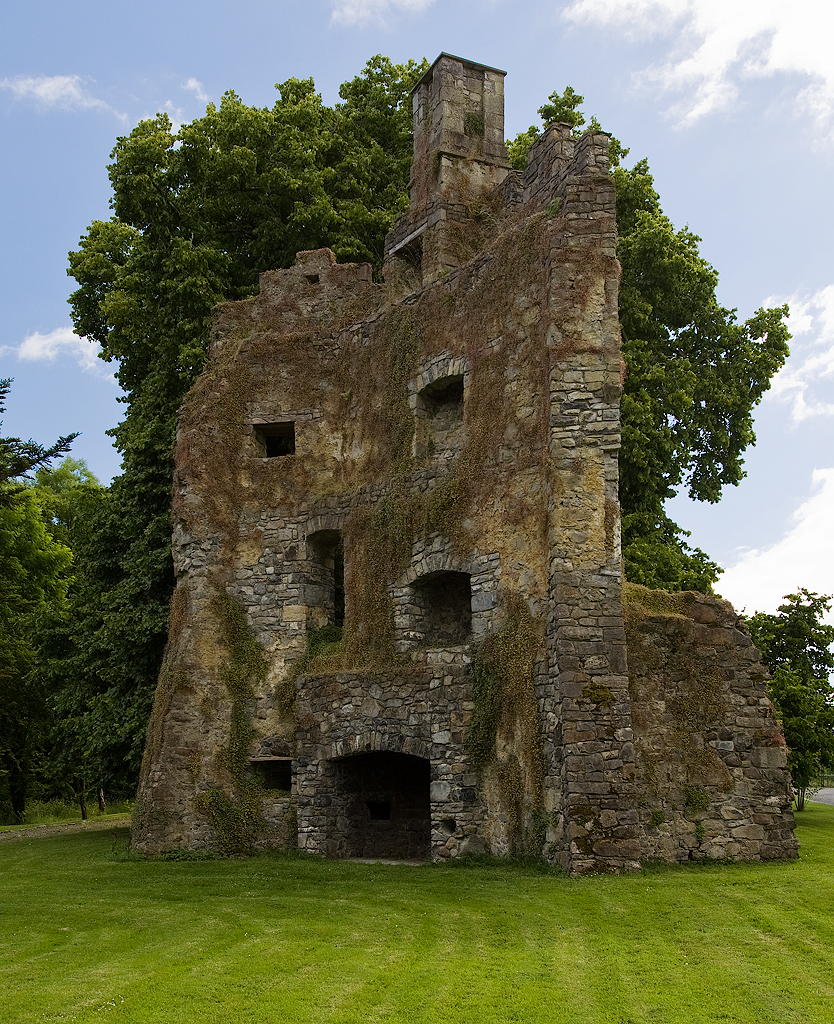
The ruin of the SE corner flanking tower on the lawn in front of the house. Part of the old castle's C17 fortifications.

== See also ==
- List of townlands of County Roscommon
- List of towns and villages in Ireland
- Cromwellian conquest of Ireland
