= Bellanamullia =

Village in County Roscommon, Ireland

Bealnamulla Béal Átha na Muille
- Village
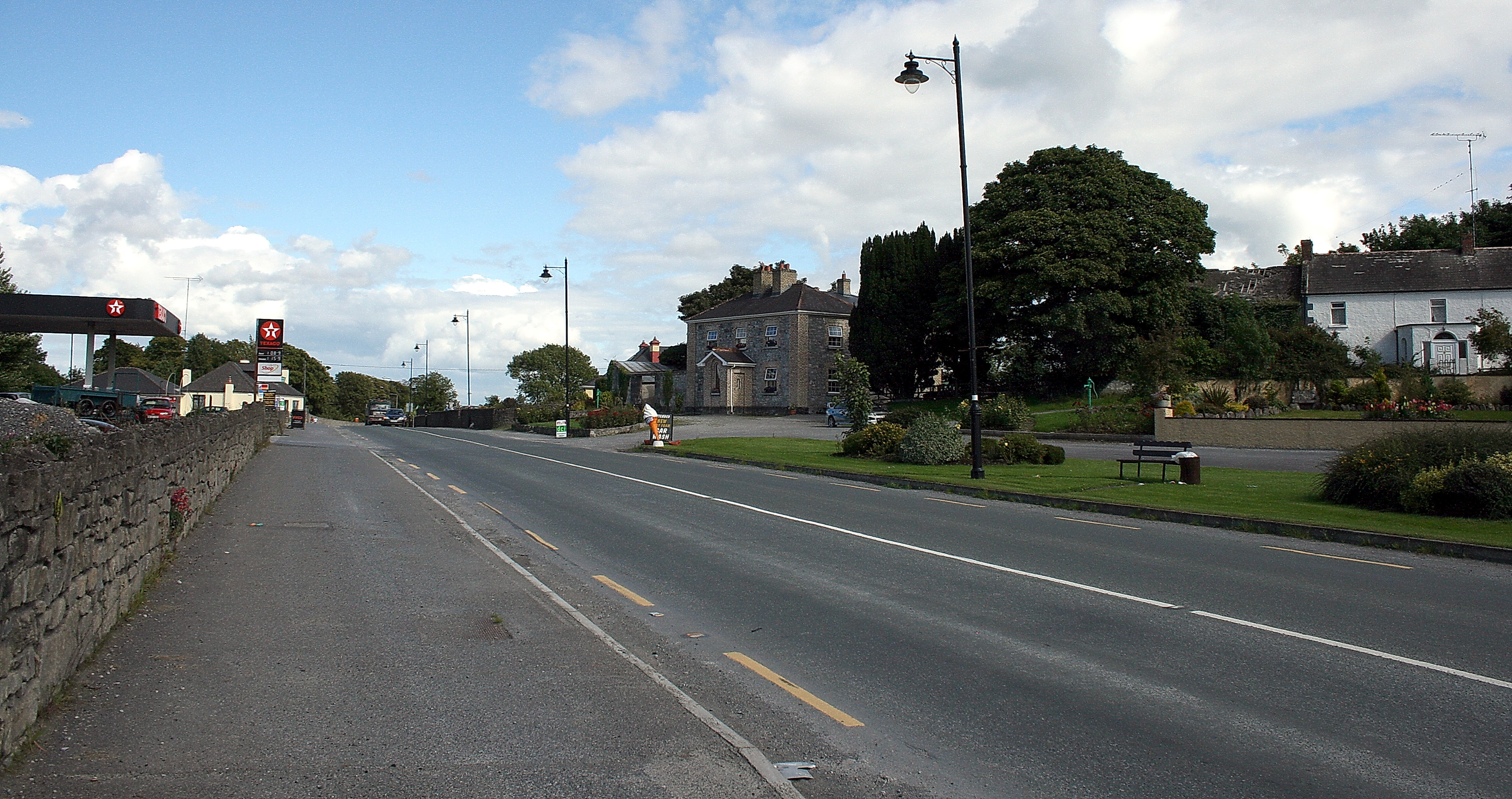
- Main Street

- Location in Ireland
- Coordinates: 53°25′37″N 8°00′51″W
- Country: Ireland
- Province: Connacht
- County: County Roscommon
- Elevation: 54 m (177 ft)
- Time zone: UTC+0 (WET)
  - Summer (DST): UTC-1 (IST (WEST))

Bellanamullia or Bealnamulla (Irish: Béal Átha na Muille, meaning 'mouth of the mill ford') is a village in County Roscommon, Ireland. It lies 4 km (2.5 mi) from the centre of Athlone, just beyond the urban boundary, on the R362 regional road.

The area has experienced growth in the early 21st century, attributable to Athlone's expansion.

Although a village in its own right, Bealnamulla is considered a suburb of Athlone town for census purposes.

The Meehambee Dolmen, a Megalithic tomb, is located about one kilometre south of the village.

== Notable people ==
- Michael Duignan, Roman Catholic prelate and current Bishop of Clonfert and Galway and Kilmacduagh, was educated in the village.

== See also ==
- List of towns and villages in Ireland
