= Creggs RFC =

Rugby union club in County Galway, Ireland

Creggs
- Full name: Creggs Rugby Football Club
- Union: IRFU; Connacht
- Founded: 1974
- Location: Creggs, County Galway, Ireland
- Ground(s): The Green, Creggs
- League: Connacht Junior 1A League

Official website
- creggsrugby.ie

Creggs Rugby Football Club is an Irish rugby union club based in Creggs, County Galway, close to the Galway–Roscommon county border. The club, which is affiliated to the Connacht branch of the Irish Rugby Football Union (IRFU), fields senior and underage teams, including boys' and girls' sections.

== History ==
Creggs RFC was formed in 1974. The club's early successes include winning the Connacht Junior Cup in 1978. The club spent two seasons in All-Ireland League Division 4 during the mid-1990s.

Creggs marked milestone anniversaries with club events including a 35th anniversary dinner in 2009, and a book launch to mark the club's 50th anniversary year in 2024.

In March 2025, Creggs won the Connacht Junior Cup for the seventh time. The club also completed a league-and-cup double that season.

== Facilities ==
Creggs play their home matches at 'The Green' in the village of Creggs. In 2017, Connacht Rugby reported that Creggs had purchased additional land and were undertaking a facilities' expansion that included laying new pitches.

The venue has also been used to host provincial fixtures, including schools competitions staged by Connacht Rugby.

== Honours ==
- Connacht Junior Cup: (7) (Creggs have won the trophy seven times, most recently in 2025)

== Notable players ==
- Ivana Kiripati – Ireland Women's international.

== See also ==
- Connacht Rugby
