= Fuerty =

Fuerty Fiodharta
- Townland
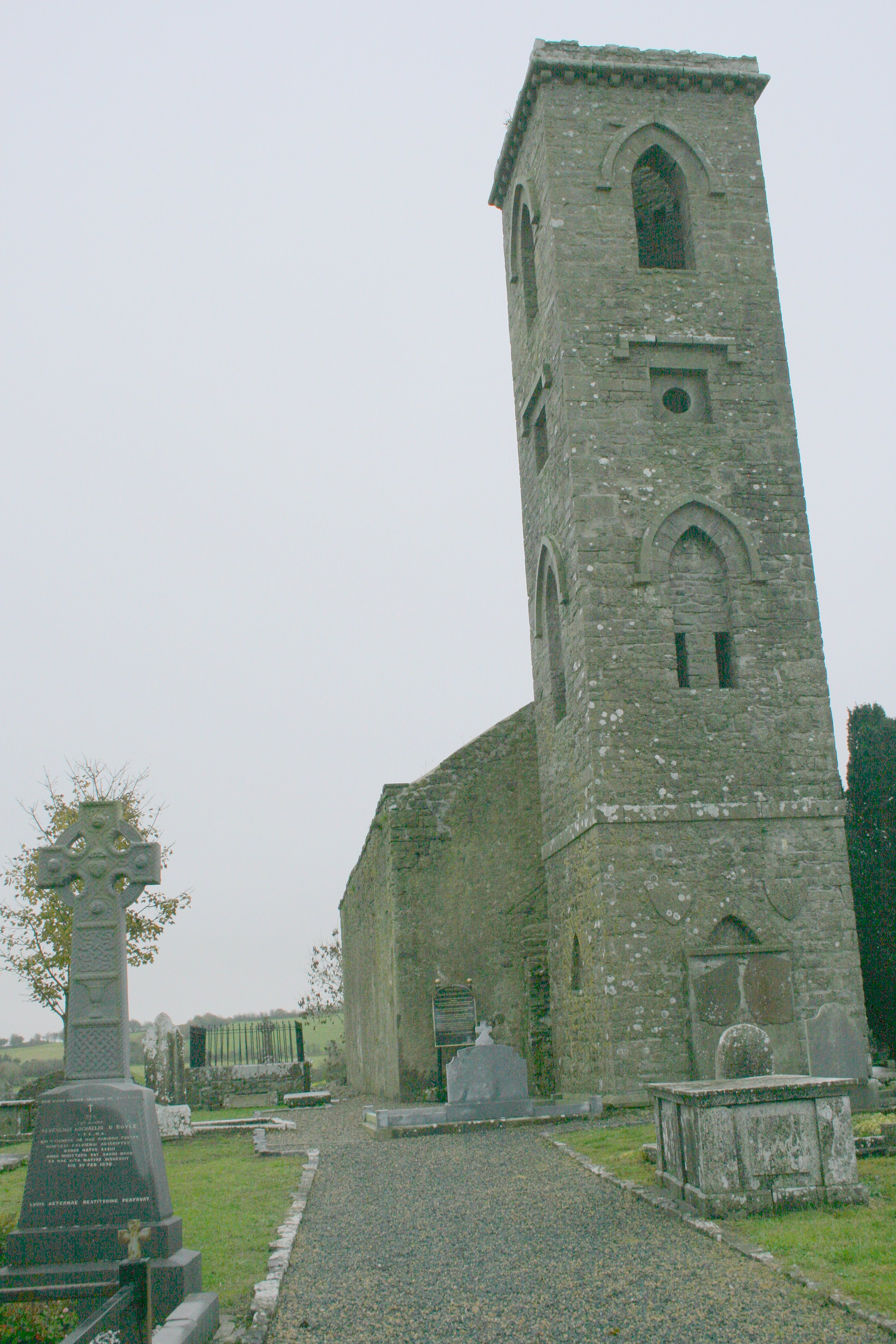
- Fuerty church and graveyard

- Location in Ireland
- Coordinates: 53°37′00″N 8°16′00″W
- Country: Ireland
- Province: Connacht
- County: County Roscommon
- Elevation: 75 m (246 ft)
- Time zone: UTC+0 (WET)
  - Summer (DST): UTC-1 (IST (WEST))
- Irish Grid Reference: M834574

Fuerty (historically Fewerty, from Irish: Fiodharta, meaning 'high wood') is a townland and civil parish on the R366 regional road near the town of Roscommon in County Roscommon, Ireland. Fuerty is known for a ruined church and ancient graveyard on the site of a Celtic Christian abbey.

== Church and graveyard ==
It is said that Saint Patrick visited Fuerty and left a deacon to found a monastic settlement here. The deacon, Justus, baptised Saint Ciarán, a local man around the year 500. Ciaran went on to found Clonmacnoise, which became one of the most important monasteries and centres of learning in Europe.

Two 8th century granite grave slabs in the west side of the tower bear inscriptions that can still be read. One of them bears the name of Ardeachan, Abbot of Clonmacnoise. The abbey was attacked and destroyed by the English Elizabethan invaders and all its monks were slain. Later, during the Cromwellian conquest of Ireland, it is claimed in a book by Skeffington Gibbon (published in 1829) that Cromwellian troops, under the leadership of Colonel (or Major) Ormsby, 'immolated' (i.e. killed by fire) more than one hundred elderly clergy at Fuerty abbey.

The existing ruins are of a 17th-century Church of Ireland. The tower was added in 1790 but the church was destroyed by fire in 1870.

== See also ==
- List of towns and villages in Ireland
