= R362 road (Ireland) =

Road in Ireland

R362 road
- Bóthar R362
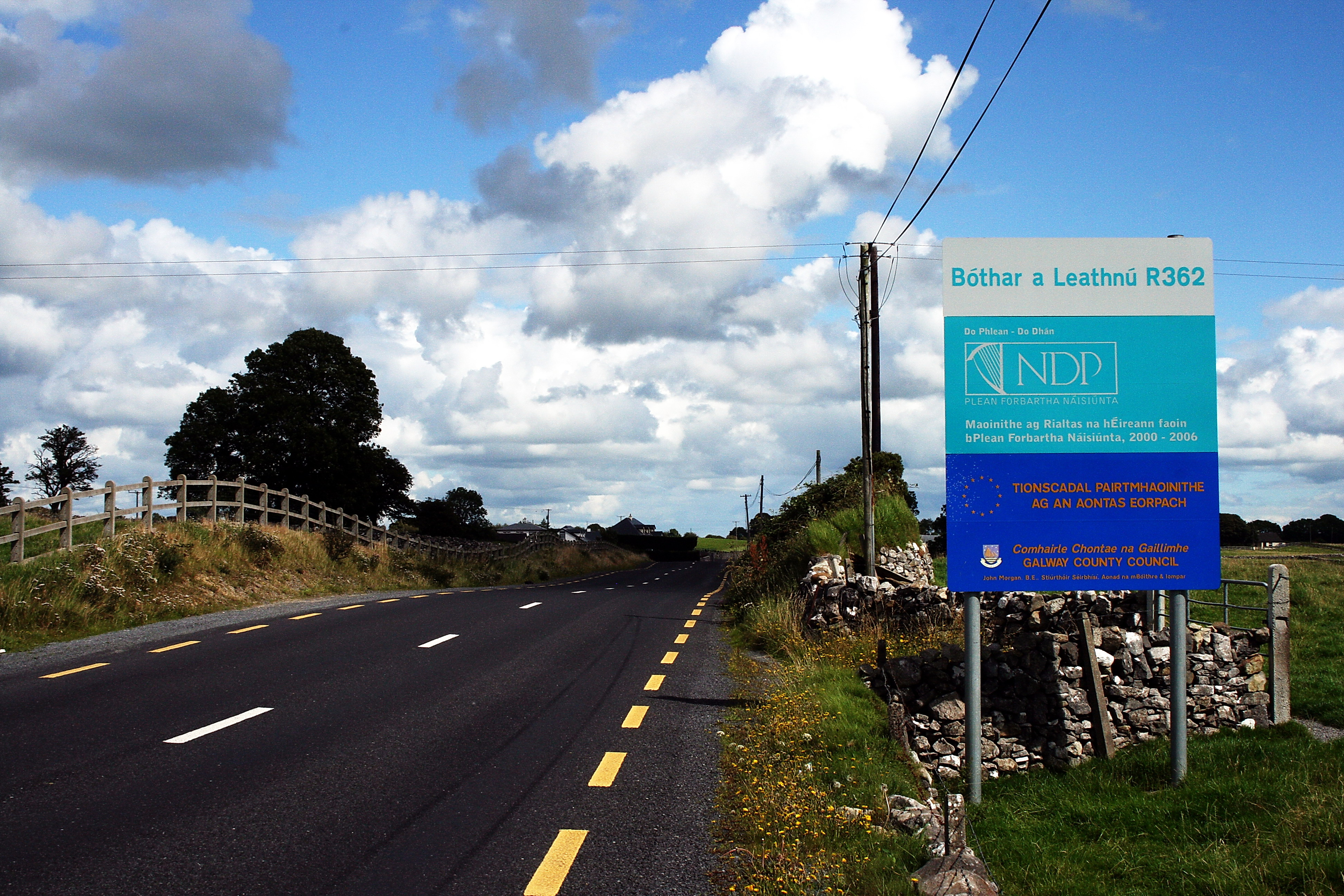
- R362 between Dunmore and Glenamaddy

Route information
- Length: 55 km (34 mi)

Location
- Country: Ireland
- Primary destinations: County Galway; 5 km northeast of Dunmore – leave the R360; Boyounagh; Glenamaddy – (R364); Glenamaddy Turlough; Creggs; County Roscommon; (R366); Castlestrange stone; Athleague – (N63); Rahara; Curraghboy; (R363); Bellanamullia – Meehambee Dolmen; Athlone – Terminates at the M6 at a grade separated junction.

Highway system
- Roads in Ireland; Motorways; Primary; Secondary; Regional

The R362 road is a regional road in Ireland linking Dunmore on the N83 (via 5 km of the R360) with the M6 at Athlone. It passes through Glenamaddy, Creggs, Athleague and Curraghboy en route. The road is 55 km (34 mi) long.

== See also ==
- Roads in Ireland
- National primary road
- National secondary road
