= Ivana Kiripati =

Irish rugby union player

- Born: 6 August 2003 (age 23) New Zealand
- Height: 157 cm (5 ft 2 in)

Rugby union career
- Position: Back row
- Current team: Creggs RFC
Provincial / State sides
Years	Team	Apps	(Points)
–	Connacht		
International career
Years	Team	Apps	(Points)
2025–	Ireland	2	(0)

Ivana Kiripati (born 6 August 2003) is an Irish rugby union player who plays in the back row for Creggs RFC and Connacht, and represents Ireland at international level.

== Early life and education ==
Kiripati was born in New Zealand and is of Samoan heritage. She was raised and educated in Athlone, and played her underage rugby with Buccaneers RFC.

She earned a scholarship to American International College in Springfield, Massachusetts, and graduated in 2025, studying criminal justice and psychology.

Rugby is a family tradition: her parents Kolo and Mele both played, and Mele coached Kiripati during her time with Buccaneers.

== Club and provincial career ==
After playing underage rugby with Buccaneers, Kiripati became registered with Creggs and progressed through Connacht’s age-grade pathway. She also featured for the Clovers in the Celtic Challenge.

== International career ==
Kiripati represented Ireland at under-20 level, including selection for the 2024 Six Nations Women’s Summer Series squad, where she was listed among the under-23 players available for selection.

In May 2025, she was named in Ireland’s Rugby World Cup preparation squad. She made her senior debut against Scotland at Virgin Media Park, Cork, in August 2025. She won a second cap during the same warm-up window, against Canada.

Kiripati was named in Ireland’s squad for the 2025 Women's Rugby World Cup.

== Contracts ==
In November 2025, Kiripati was awarded her first senior national contract as part of the IRFU’s centralised Women’s High Performance Programme for the 2025–26 season.
