= Glenamaddy Turlough =

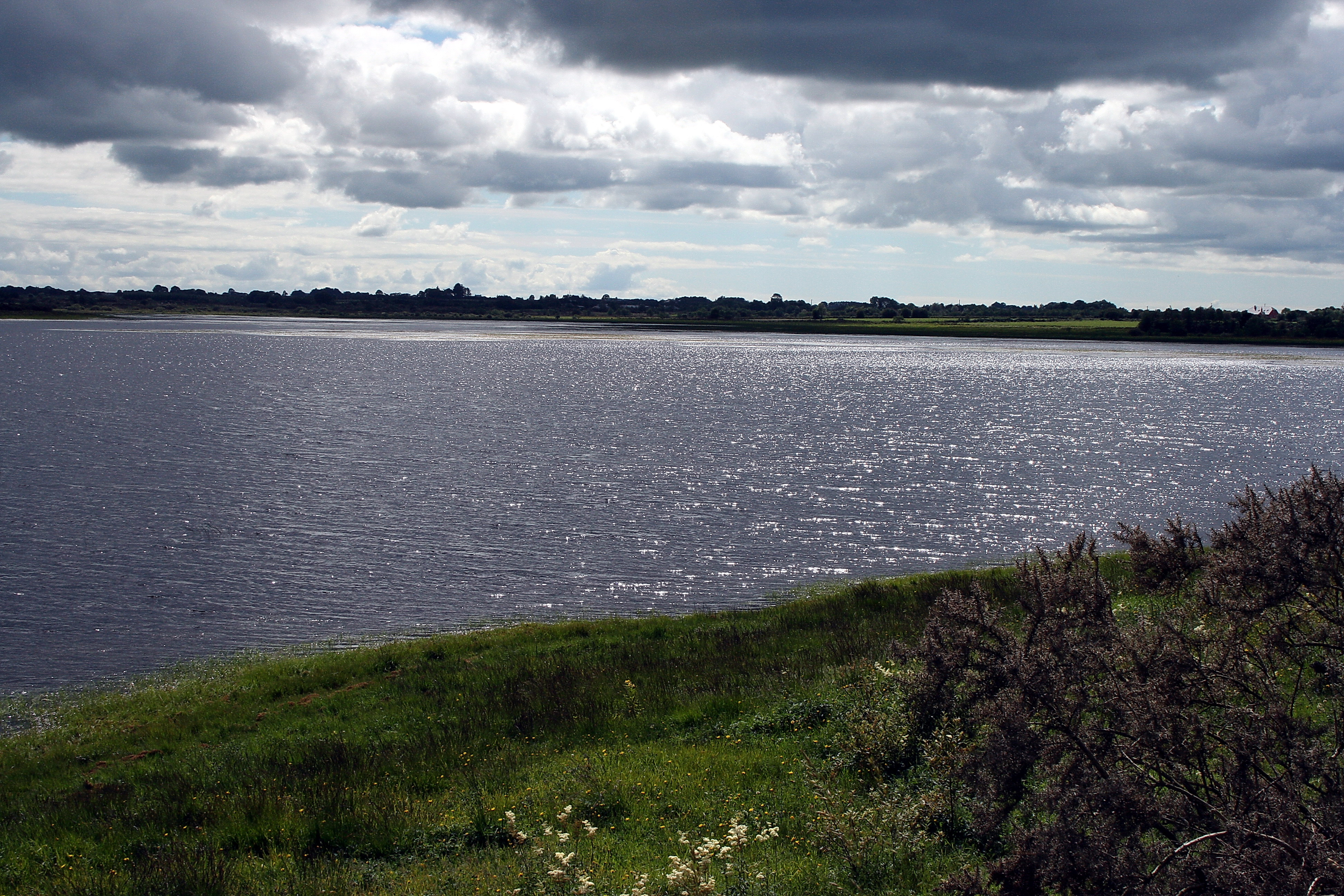
- August 2007. In the very wet summer of 2007 the lake is at its full winter level. Normally it is dried out in August.

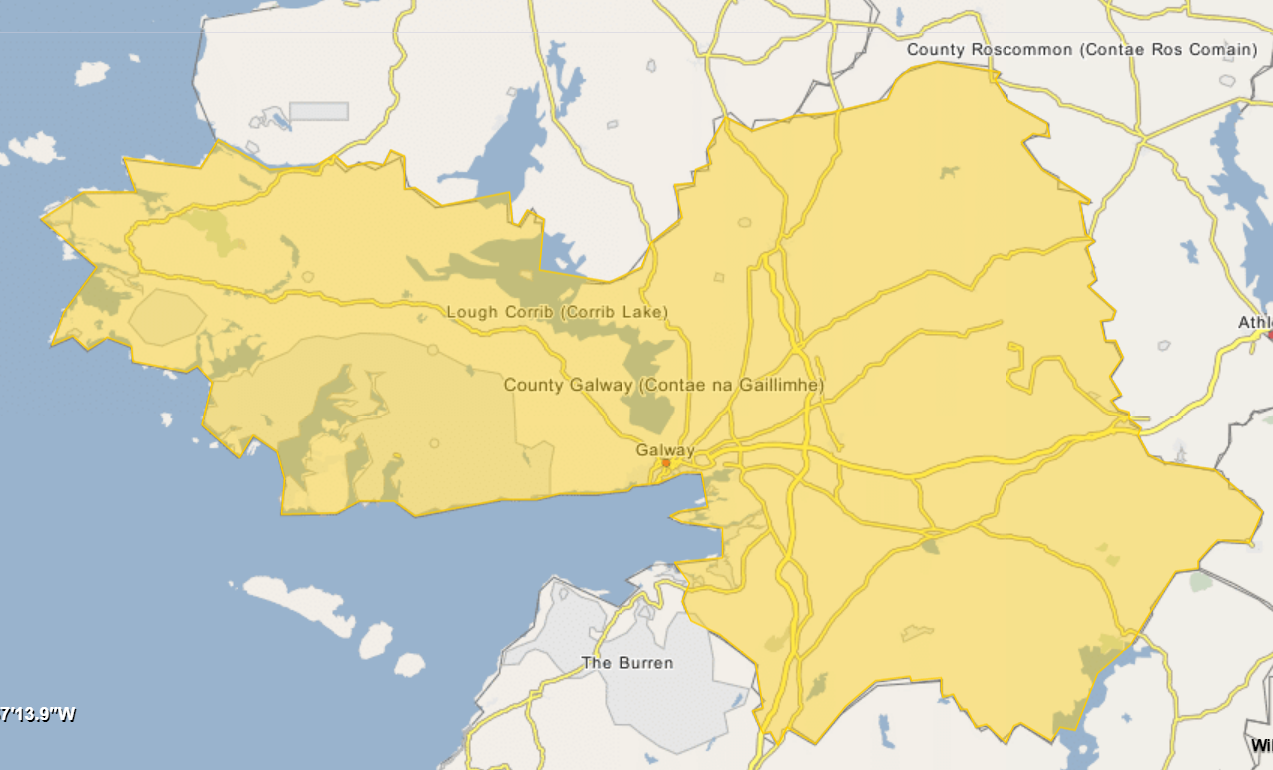
- Location within County Galway
- Location: County Galway
- Coordinates: 53°35′50″N 8°32′20″W
- Type: Turlough
- Basin countries: Ireland
- Surface area: 170 hectares (1.7 km^{2})

Glenamaddy Turlough is a turlough (seasonal lake which usually dries up in summer) east of the town of Glenamaddy, County Galway in Ireland. Glenamaddy Turlough lies alongside the R362 regional road in the outskirts of the town. It is part of a Special Area of Conservation defined by the National Parks and Wildlife Service.

The turlough is a habitat for many species of wetland birds, including the golden plover, whooper swans, wigeons, curlews and lapwing amongst others. Plant life includes large stands of peat grassland, Common Sedge, Amphibious Bistort and the rare Fen Violet which is a protected plant species.

== See also ==
- List of loughs in Ireland
- Geography of Ireland
