= Cornafulla =

Cornafulla Corr Na Fola
- Village
- Location in Ireland
- Coordinates: 53°22′34″N 8°00′18″W
- Country: Ireland
- Province: Connacht
- County: County Roscommon

Government
  - Dáil Éireann: Roscommon–Galway
- Time zone: UTC+0 (WET)
  - Summer (DST): UTC-1 (IST (WEST))
- Area code: 090, +353 90

Cornafulla (Irish: Corr na Fola, meaning 'hill of the blood') is a village in the parish of Drum in south County Roscommon, Ireland about 8 km west of Athlone along the R446 road. In the centre of the village is a national (primary) school, garage and car sales business. The post office and convenience store closed in 2019. The current national school was built in the 1980s to replace the original school. The old school house is now rented by the new school due to the large number of students attending. Construction of a major extension to the school was completed in 2011, and the school was recorded as having over 290 pupils enrolled as of 2013.

== See also ==
- List of towns and villages in Ireland
