= Skeffington Gibbon =

Irish writer

Skeffington Gibbon (fl. c. 1796) was an Irish writer.

The name "Skeffington Gibbon" is a pseudonym, as may also be "Augustus O'Kelly", the name that appears in the first version of his most famous book, published privately by O'Kelly himself in 1824. Patrick Melvin, author of Estates and Landed Society in Galway says "O'Kelly appears to have been either James or Augustus O'Kelly, a brother of Patrick O'Kelly or Kelly author of the Doneraile litany and The Eudoxologist--a poem in which he sung the praises of the gentry of Galway, Mayo and Roscommon".

This Augustus O'Kelly published a number of pamphlets in the 19th century but he is best known as the author of The Recollections of Skeffington Gibbon from 1796 to the present year, 1829; being an epitome of the lives and characters of the nobility and gentry of Roscommon; the genealogy of those who are descended from the kings of Connaught; and a memoir of the late Madame O'Connor Don.

The first edition of the book had extra words in the title, viz O'Kelly's Recollections of..... and included the name Augustus O'Kelly.

No details in the book relating to his birth, childhood or ancestry have been independently proven. The "Recollections" are highly personal and include scurrilous portraits of both families and individuals. Sir William Wilde suggested the author used his knowledge of family skeletons to make a living from the wealthy.

== Bibliography ==
- "The union of St. Patrick and John Bull". Publisher: Cork, 1864.
- "An epitome of the lives of the poets; the source and magnificent beauties of the rivers Lee, Blackwater, & Awebeg, and a poem on the sceneries of Corrin Hill". by Augustus O'Kelly Publisher: Cork, 1861.
- "Augustus O'Kelly's sixth historical, biographical and miscellaneous pamphlet, for 1863". by Augustus O'Kelly Publisher: Fermoy, pr. by William Lindsey, 1863.
- "Augustus O'Kelly's seventh historical, biographical and miscellaneous pamphlet, publ. for 1864". Language: English Publisher: Cork, pr. for the author, 1863.,
- "Skeffington Gibbon", Alan Moran, The Irish Genealogist, volume 16 no.2, 2023
