= Killian (barony) =

Barony in County Galway, Ireland

Killian Cill Liatháin (Irish)
- Barony
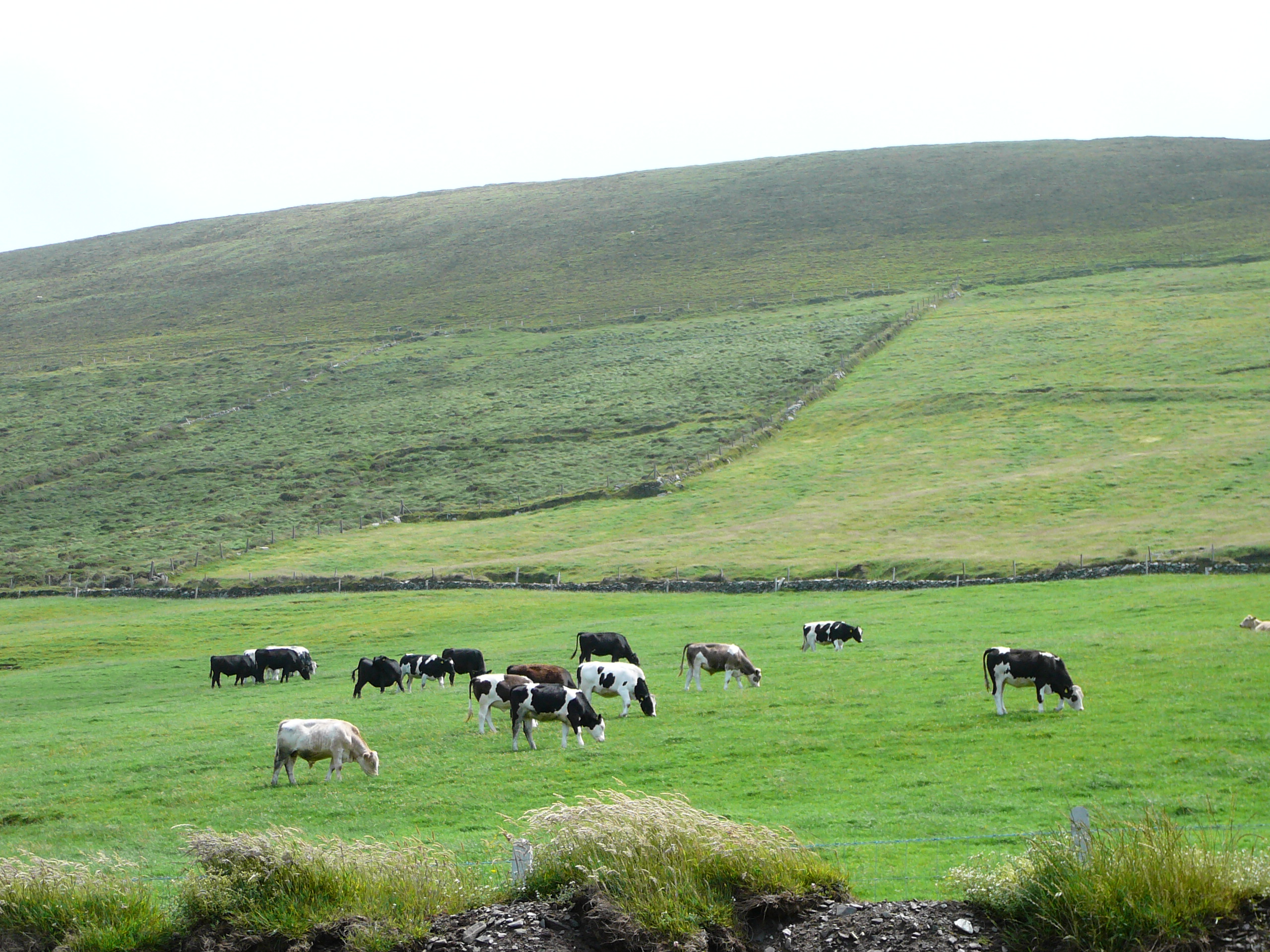
- Farmland in the townlands of Curry and Cloonbanniv

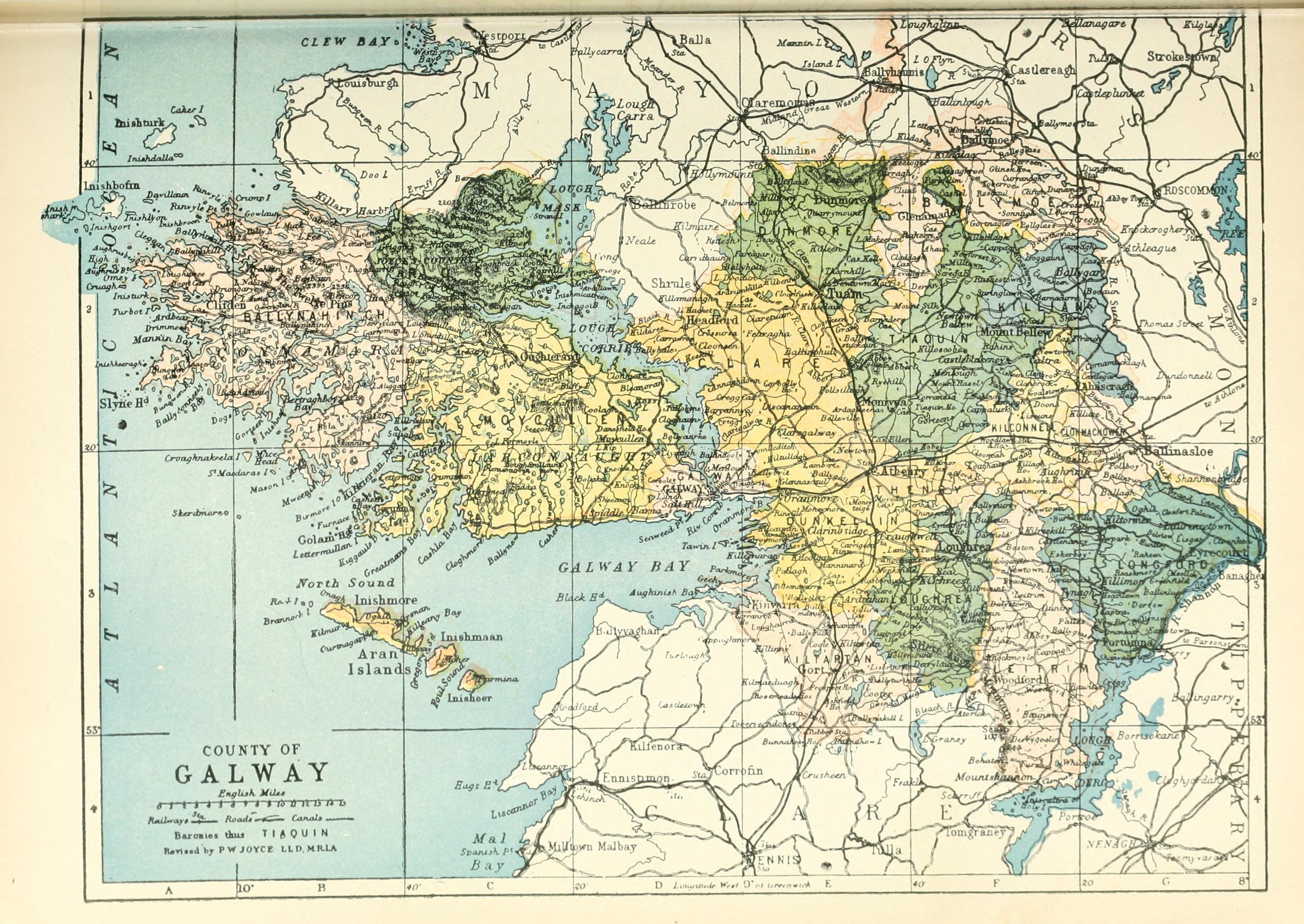
- Barony map of County Galway, 1900; Killian is in the east, coloured blue.

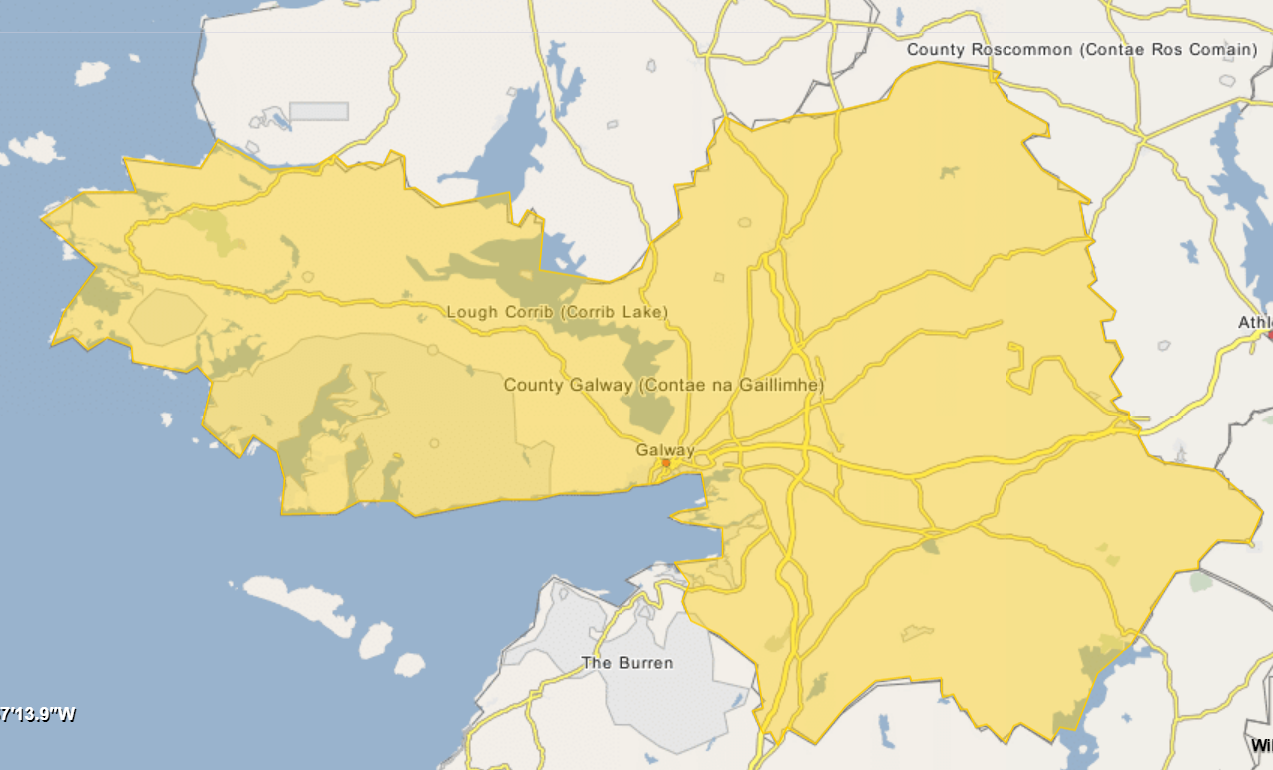
- Location within County Galway
- Coordinates: 53°29′N 8°21′W
- Sovereign state: Ireland
- Province: Connacht
- County: Galway

Area
  - Total: 262.3 km^{2} (101.3 sq mi)

Killian (Irish: Cill Liatháin) is a historical barony in eastern County Galway, Ireland.

Baronies were mainly cadastral rather than administrative units. They acquired modest local taxation and spending functions in the 19th century before being superseded by the Local Government (Ireland) Act 1898.

== History ==
The name derived from Irish Cill Liatháin, "Liadán's church," named for Liadán (Liedania), mother of Ciarán of Saigir.

The medieval Gaelic lords were the O'Moran, who ruled an area around Criffon, also including part of the barony of Ballymoe. After the Norman invasion of Ireland, the Cheevers family had land in Killian.

Killian barony was created before 1574.

== Geography ==
Killian is in the northeast of the county, on the west bank of the River Suck, where it forms part of the border with County Roscommon. It contains the lower reaches of the Shiven River, and Carrownagappul Bog.

== List of settlements ==
Settlements within the historical barony of Killian include:

- Ballygar
- Mountbellew
- Newbridge
