= Creggs =

Village in County Galway, Ireland

Creggs Na Creaga
- Village
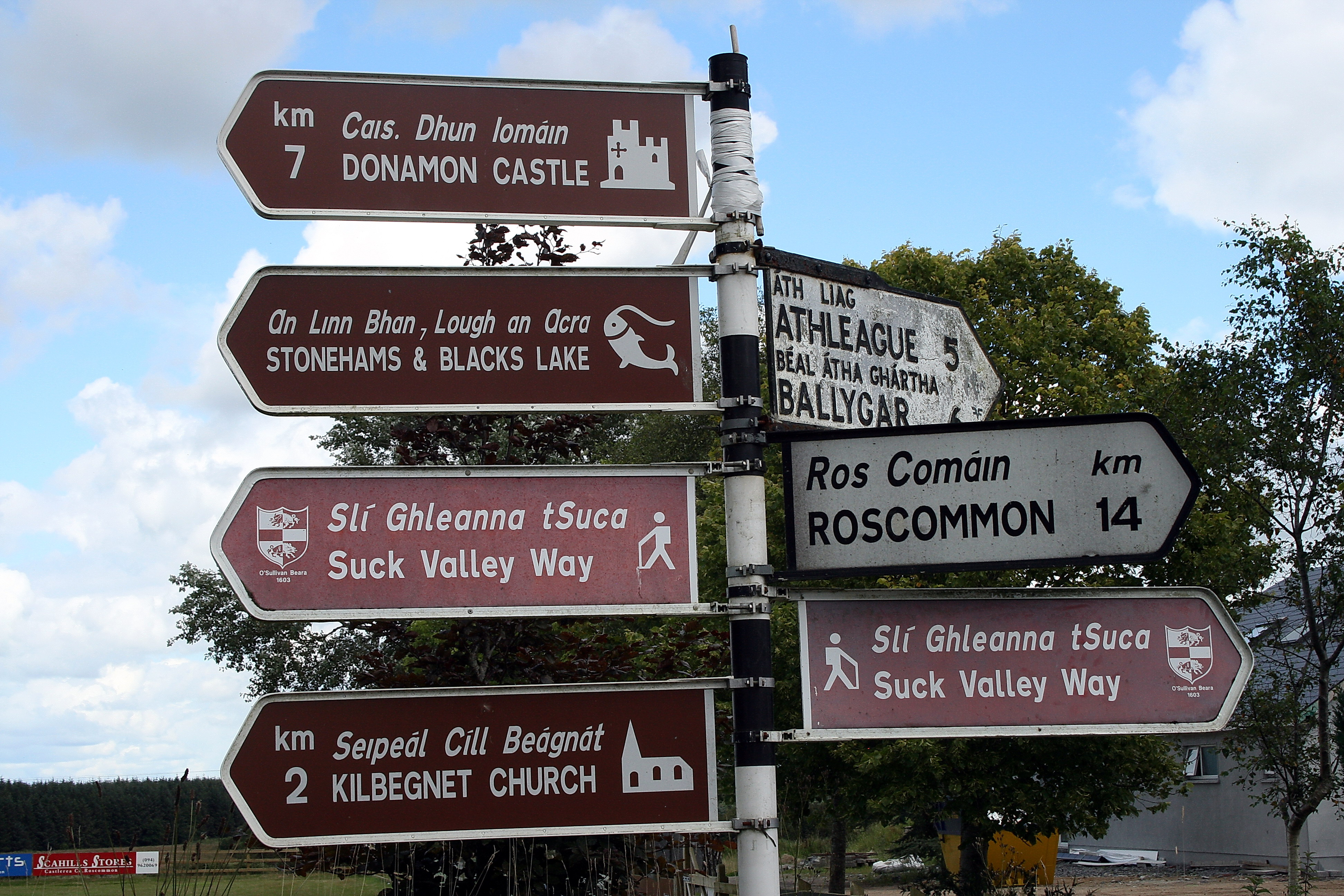
- Signpost in Creggs

- Location in Ireland
- Coordinates: 53.594°N 8.362°W
- Country: Ireland
- Province: Connacht
- County: County Galway
- Time zone: UTC±0 (WET)
  - Summer (DST): UTC+1 (IST)

Creggs (Irish: Na Creaga, lit. 'the rocks') is a small village and townland in County Galway, Ireland. It is on the border with County Roscommon, on the R362 regional road between Glenamaddy and Roscommon town.

== Amenities ==
With a population of approximately one hundred people, the village has two public houses, having formerly had seven. Creggs was once the location of a monthly fair, as well as dancing, football and feiseanna (Irish cultural festivals).

The local rugby union club, Creggs RFC, has four playing pitches, including a full-size artificial pitch. The club's grounds, known as "the Green", are surrounded by a one-kilometre community walkway.

== Parnell memorial ==
Charles Stewart Parnell delivered his last public speech at Creggs on 27 September 1891, addressing a crowd of several thousand in heavy rain despite being ill and against his doctor's advice. He died at Hove, England, nine days later, on 6 October 1891.

A memorial at the entrance to the rugby club commemorates the speech. It was unveiled by the Taoiseach, Éamon de Valera, in 1946, on the centenary of Parnell's birth.

== See also ==
- List of towns and villages in Ireland
