= Meehambee Dolmen =

Dolmen in County Roscommon, Ireland

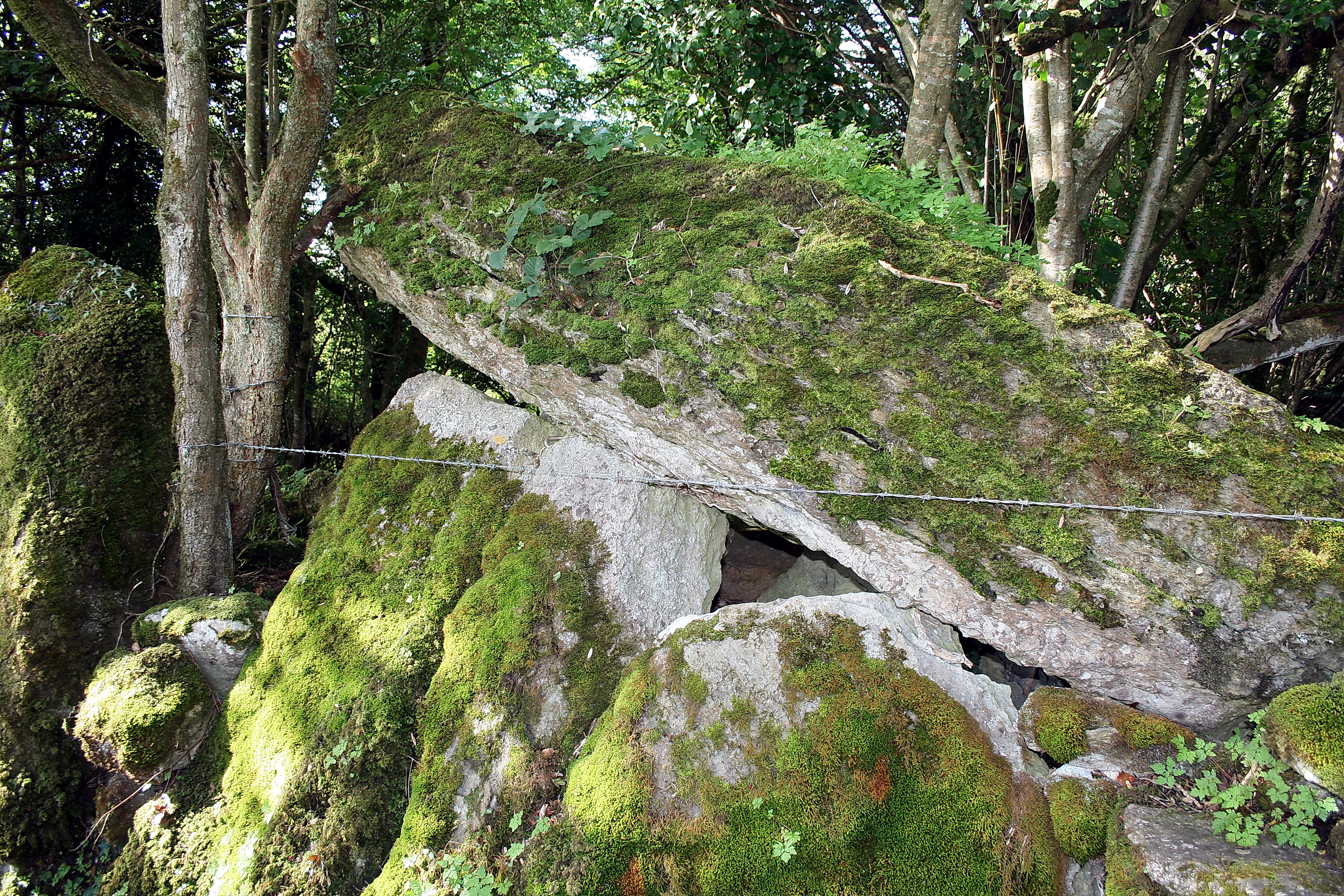
- The site in 2007
- Interactive map of Meehambee Dolmen
- 53°24′43″N 8°1′11″W
- Type: Dolmen (portal tomb)
- Location: Mihanboy, County Roscommon, Ireland

History
- Built: c. 3500 BC

Site notes
- Material: Sandstone
- Height: 2.3 m (7 ft 7 in)

The Meehambee Dolmen, also known as the Mihanboy Portal Tomb, is a Neolithic portal tomb located in the townland of Mihanboy, near Athlone in County Roscommon, Ireland. The monument is dated to around 3500 BC and is listed as a Recorded Monument under the National Monuments Acts.

Two stone axes were discovered near the tomb in the 1960s by local schoolchildren, indicating Neolithic activity in the surrounding landscape.

== Description ==
Meehambee is a characteristic Irish portal tomb consisting of tall portal stones, side stones and a doorstone supporting a large capstone. The surviving portal stone stands 2.3 meters high. The sandstone capstone, measuring approximately 4 × 2.5 meters, is estimated to weigh around 24 tonnes.

The rear support stone collapsed sometime after the medieval period, causing the capstone to slide backwards into its present 45-degree angle. The collapse also displaced the original doorstone.

The monument stands in light woodland near a historic bridle path and is partially covered in moss and leaf-litter, consistent with similar unexcavated sites in the region.

== Discovery and archaeological notes ==
Although locally known for centuries, Meehambee Dolmen entered official archaeological records in the 20th century and appears in the National Monuments Service database as RMP RO045-053001.

In a 2023, archaeological assessment conducted for Roscommon County Council, local oral tradition recorded that an 18th-century headstone in a nearby graveyard may have been fashioned from a missing stone of the tomb, though no physical evidence confirms this.

== Name and folklore ==
The Irish name of the townland, An Meathán Buí (“the yellow meadow”), gives rise to the anglicised form Meehambee.

In the 1930s, the Schools’ Folklore Collection recorded the dolmen under the name Leabaidh Éirn (“Éirn’s bed”). The account describes “four upright slabs topped by a huge oblong stone” and mentions a nearby earthwork known as “the Fort”, associated with fairy lore.

Some modern heritage writers note the presence of a hawthorn tree growing close to the monument, a species often linked with traditional beliefs in Ireland.

== Setting and access ==
The dolmen lies off an old bridle path that runs west of Bellanamullia. It is situated a short distance from the M6 motorway and accessed via a local road off the R362.

During motorway construction, the pathway leading to the monument was restored following community efforts to maintain access to the historic route.

== Archaeological context ==
Portal tombs date to the early and middle Neolithic (c. 3800–3200 BC) and are among the earliest megalithic monuments in Ireland. Excavated examples elsewhere in Ireland have produced human bone, stone tools, pottery fragments and other deposits.

Meehambee Dolmen has not been excavated, but its form and setting closely match the wider pattern of portal tombs concentrated in the Burren, Sligo–Leitrim uplands and the Midlands.

== Gallery ==
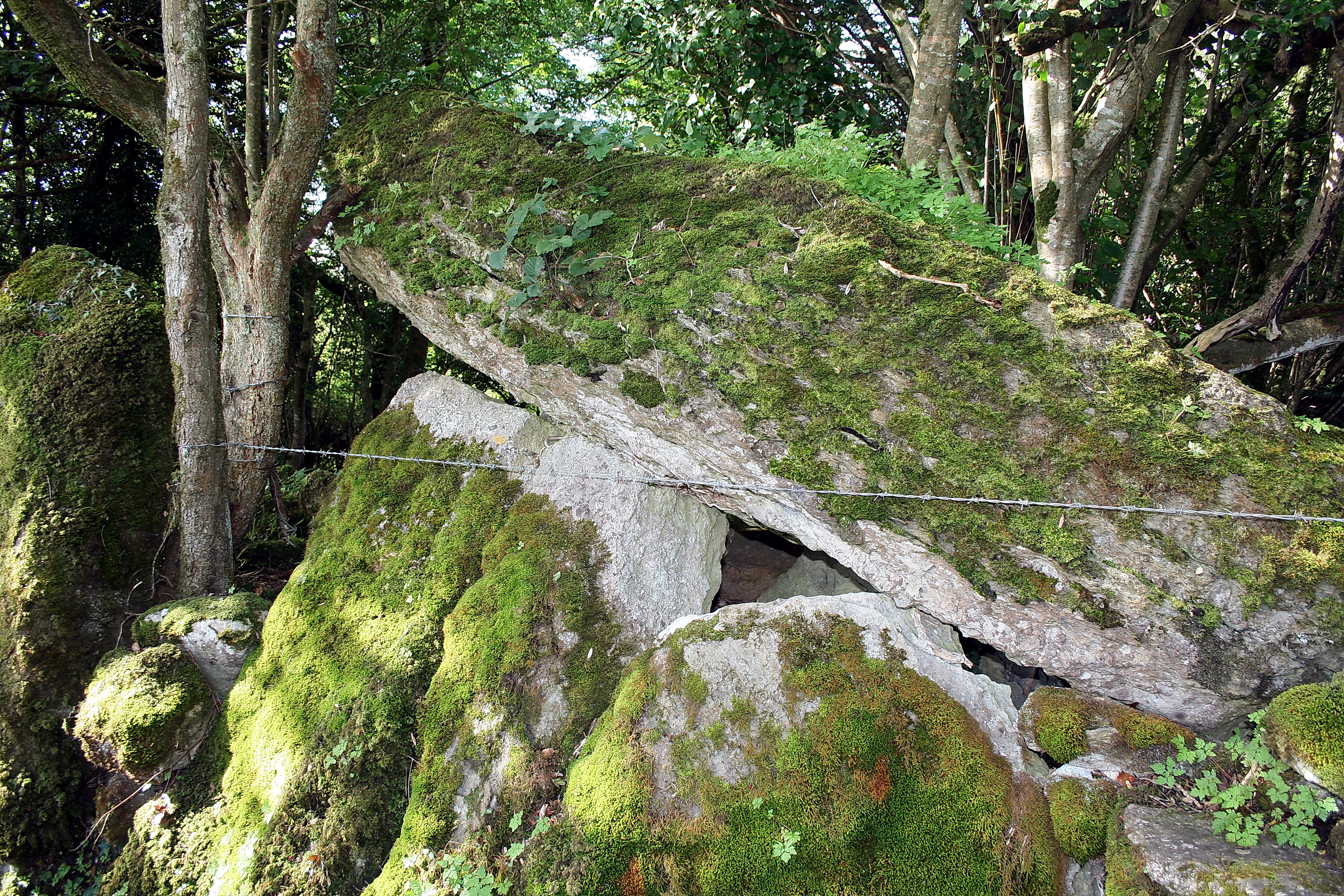
Meehambee Dolmen

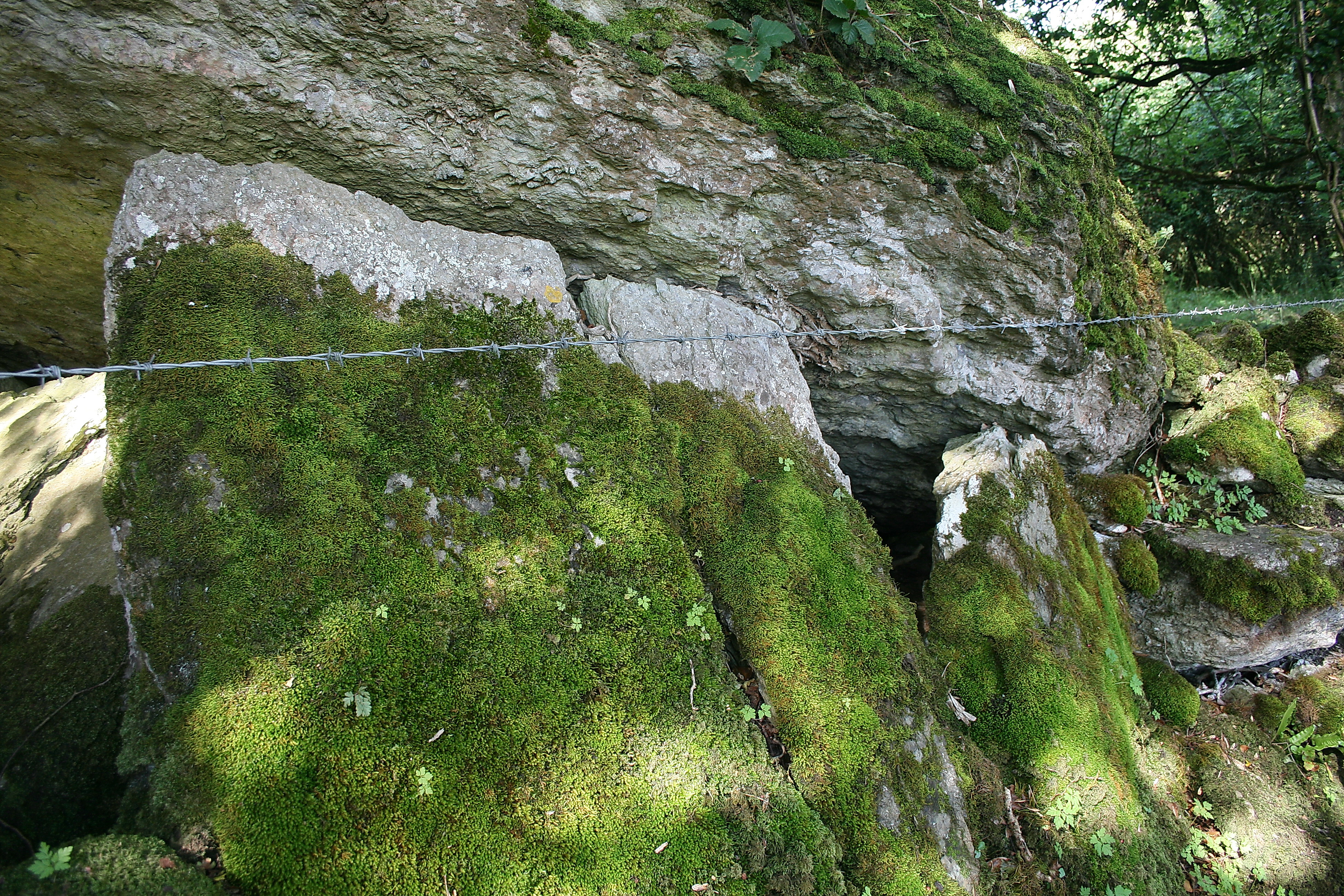
Meehambee Dolmen

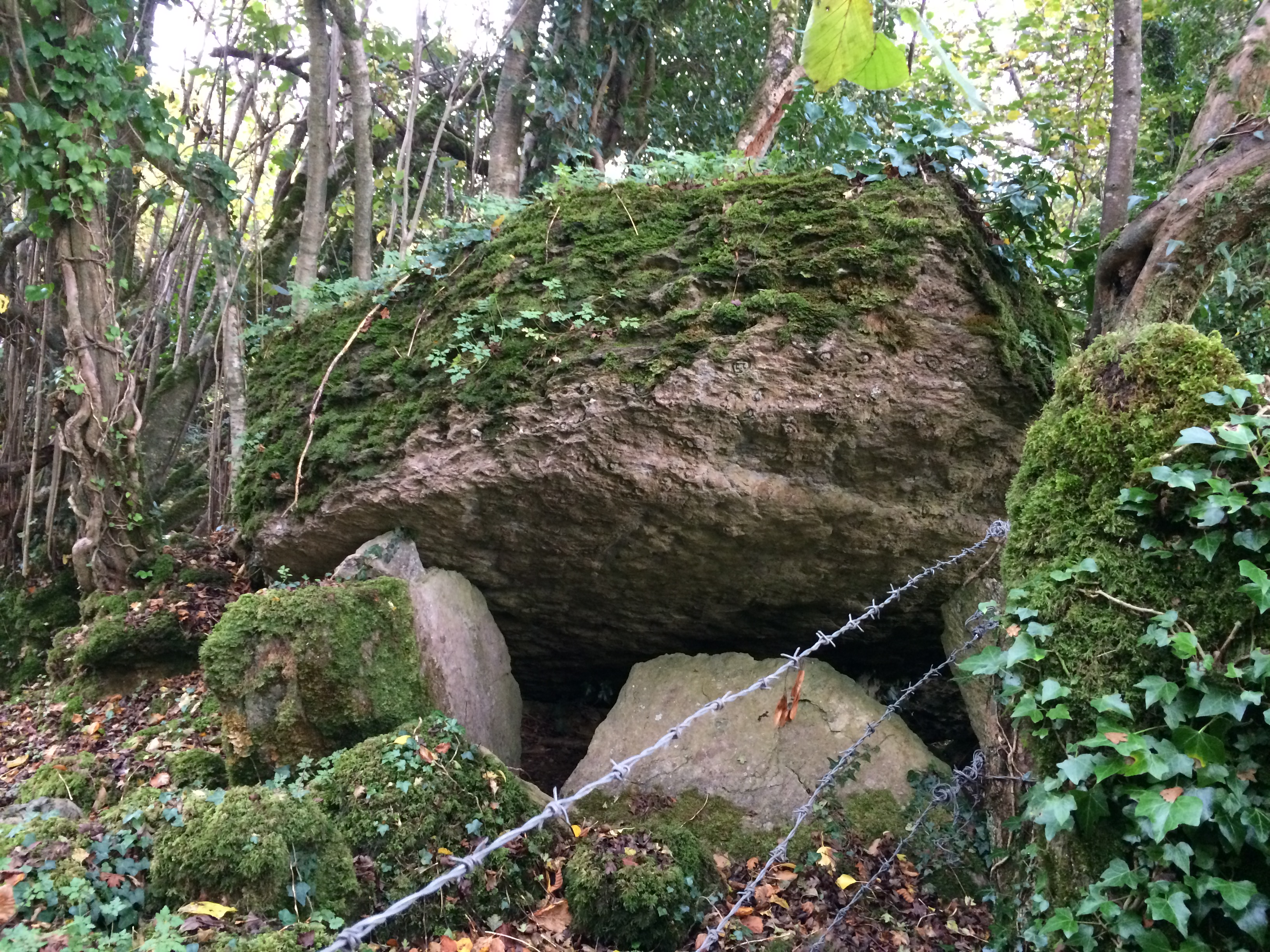
Meehambee Dolmen

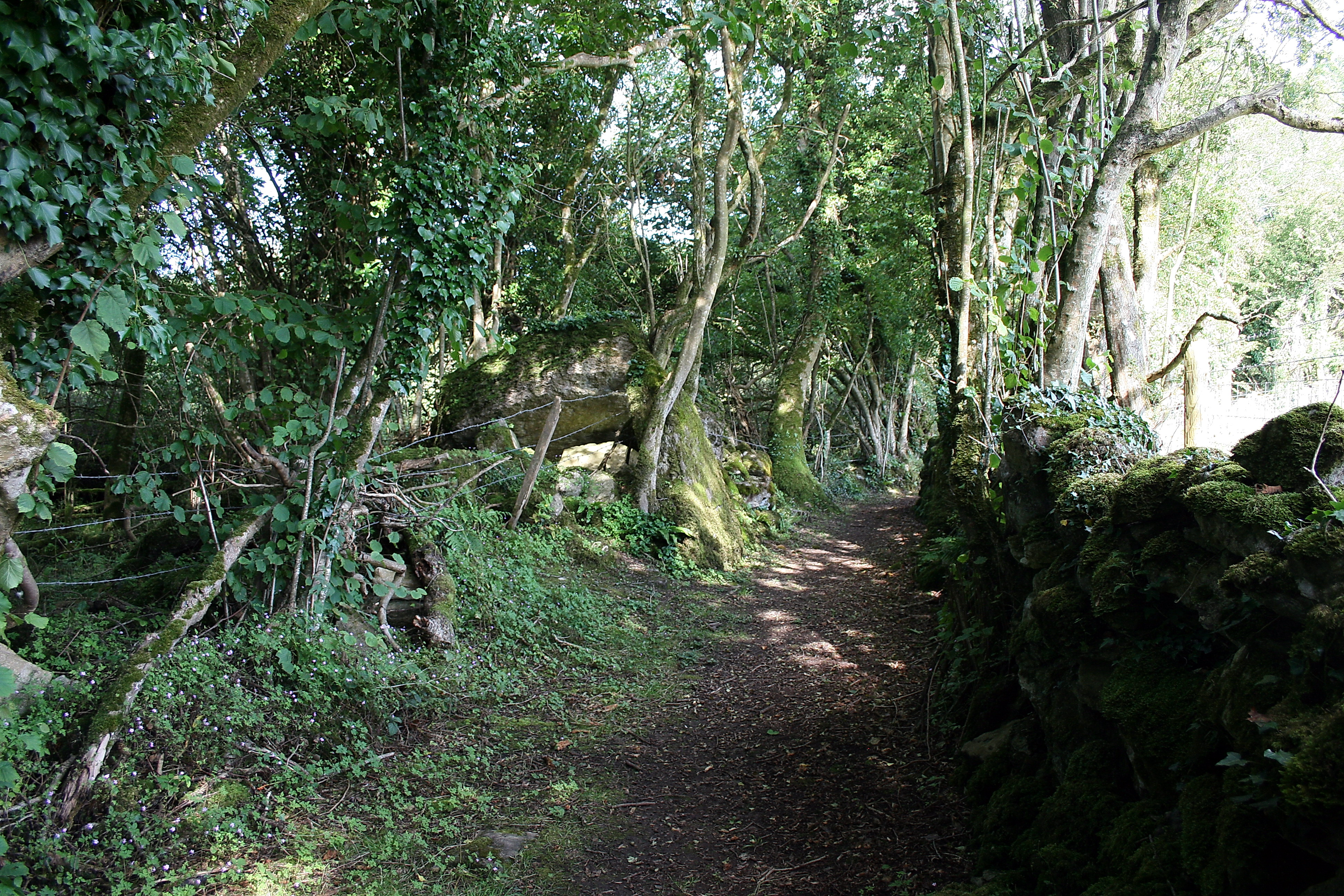
Camouflaged in moss, hardly visible on the bridle path

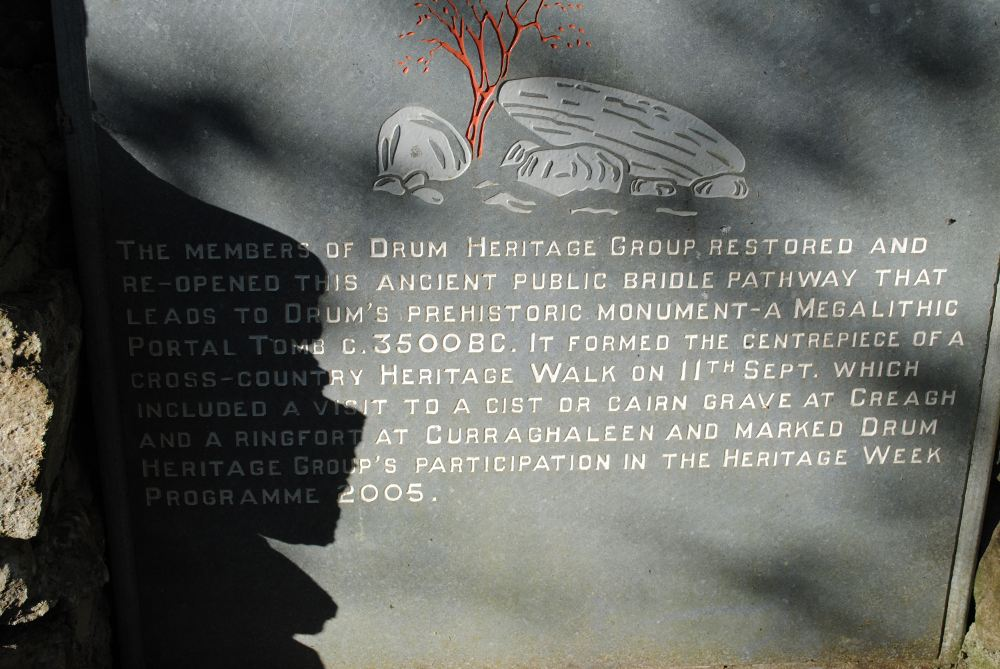
Information panel at site entrance

== See also ==
- Portal tomb
- Megalithic monuments in Ireland
- Neolithic Europe
