= Curraghboy =

Village in County Roscommon, Ireland

Curraghboy An Currach Buí
- Village
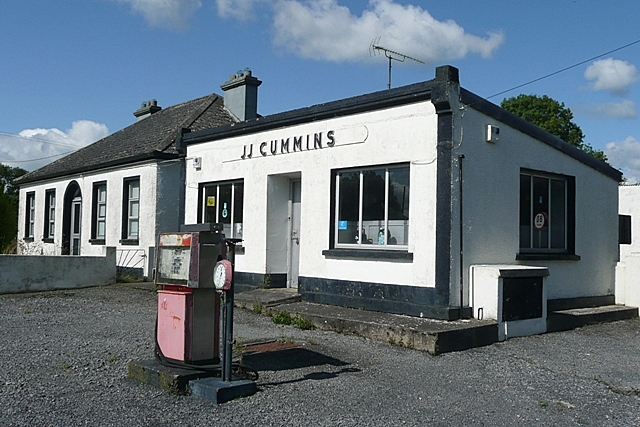
- Disused garage at Curraghboy

- Location in Ireland
- Coordinates: 53°29′02″N 8°06′36″W
- Country: Ireland
- Province: Connacht
- County: County Roscommon
- Time zone: UTC+0 (WET)
  - Summer (DST): UTC-1 (IST (WEST))

Curraghboy (Irish: An Currach Buí, meaning 'the yellow marsh') is a rural village in County Roscommon, Ireland. It lies 14 km (8.7 mi) northwest of Athlone on the R362 regional road. It has one public house and two grocery shops. It also has an indoor handball alley, Roman Catholic church and a national (primary) school.

== See also ==
- List of towns and villages in Ireland
