= Glenamaddy =

Town in County Galway, Ireland

Glenamaddy Gleann na Madadh (Irish)
- Town
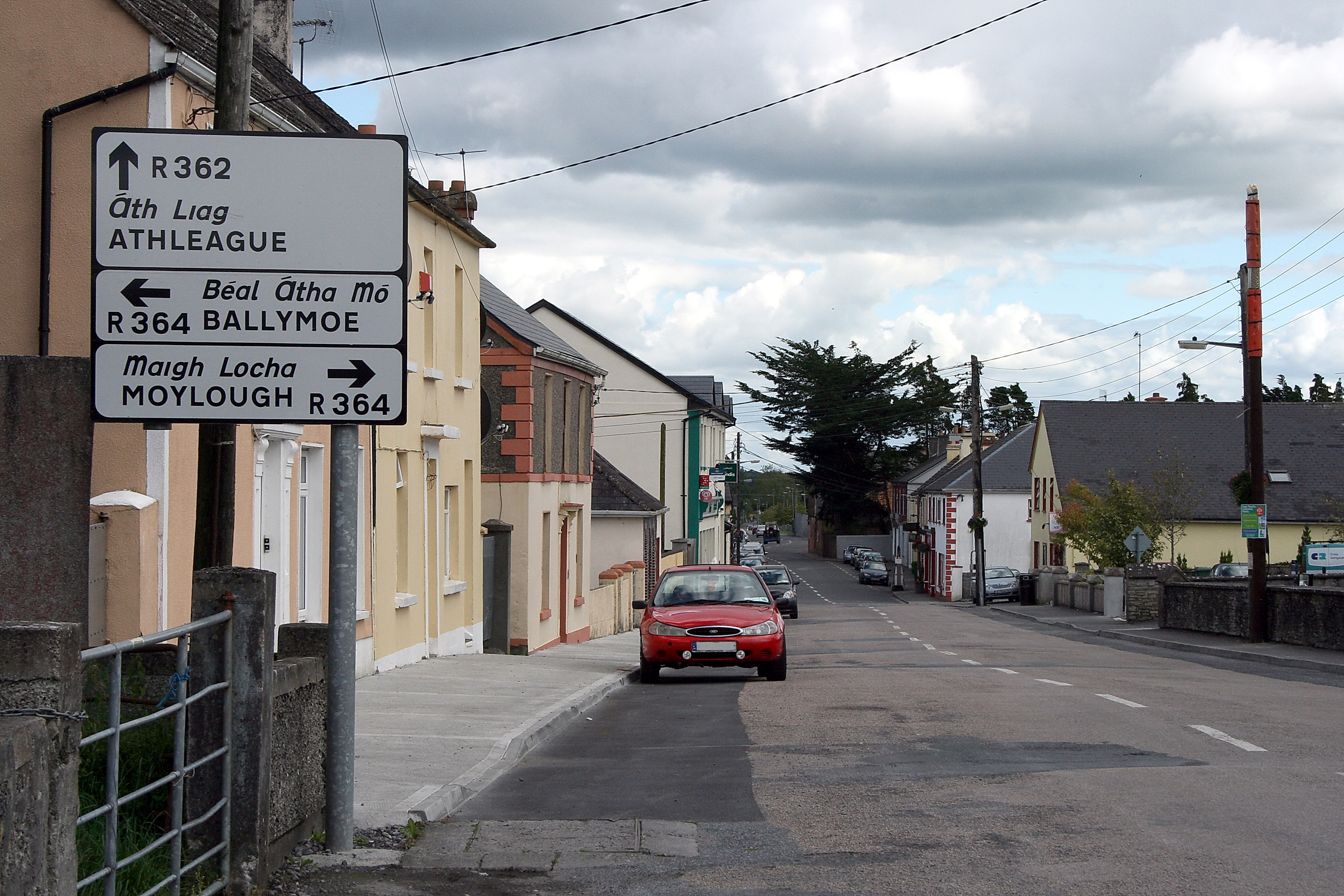
- Glenamaddy

- Location in Ireland
- Coordinates: 53.606°N 8.560°W
- Country: Ireland
- Province: Connacht
- County: County Galway
- Elevation: 87 m (285 ft)

Population (2022)
  - Total: 557
- Irish Grid Reference: M627620

Glenamaddy, or Glennamaddy (Irish: Gleann na Madadh), is a small town in County Galway, Ireland. 50 km north-east of Galway city, it lies at the crossroads of the R362 and R364 roads. Glenamaddy became a musical focal point in Connacht during the 1960s during the showband era.

To the east of the town lies Loch Lurgeen, a raised bog. The origins of the parish lie in the village of Boyounagh, which lies to the northwest of Glenamaddy.

== Name ==
It is unclear what the exact meaning and Irish translation for Glenamaddy is. It could be derived from the Irish Gleann na Madadh, Gleann meaning glen (valley) and madhadh from madra meaning dog. This would suggest that the name means Valley of the Dogs. This name could have originated from the shape of the Glenamaddy Turlough as looked at from above.

Glenamaddy might also have come from Gleann na Maighe Duibhí or Valley of the Black Plain, presumably because of the turlough lake in the area which dries up every year leaving behind a black plain of limestone.

== History ==
Glenamaddy was located in what was the medieval kingdom of Uí Díarmata, ruled by the O Concannon dynasty.

The town itself did not develop until the 1820s when a church was built and regular markets began in the town. From this time on, the town began to grow and shops and pubs were built around the square and on the four roads leading into the town. These "four roads" are reflected in a song of the same name. In 1853, a workhouse was built on the Creggs road.

In 1904, St. Patrick's church was built to replace the older church which was in the grounds of where the town graveyard stands today. In 1909, St. Bridget's Town Hall was built. In 1924, a mill was built in Leitra and gave employment in the area. Other local historic sites include a megalithic tomb at Ballinastack and a crannóg on Kiltullagh lake.

In the early 20th century, markets were common in the town as for some small cottage industries it was the main outlet for their wares. Cattle, pigs, sheep, animal feeds, and household supplies were all sold at these markets and large crowds gathered in the town on these days.

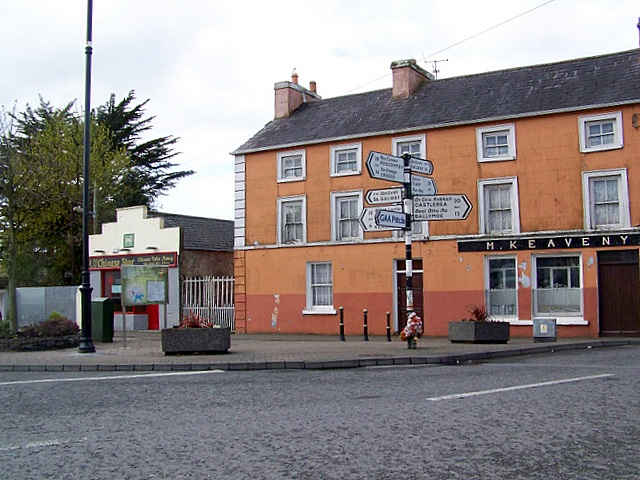
Crossroads in Glenamaddy

In the 21st century, Glenamaddy has some decline, including with the loss of its Bank of Ireland and Ulster Bank branches in 2006 and 2013 respectively. As of 2015, the town had reportedly lost over 120 of its young people to emigration. In the ten years between the 2006 and the 2016 census of Ireland, the population of Glenamaddy decreased by four percent, from 500 to 480 people.

=== Esker Mass Rock ===
During penal times (17th and 18th centuries), a priest would travel to Esker to celebrate mass at the site of a local mass rock. On one occasion, around the 1790s, a priest was celebrating mass at Esker. An informer had notified the authorities that the priest would be there. Although scouts were positioned along the hilltops, they didn't see the military authorities because they were dressed as common people and mingled among the crowd. As soon as the priest arrived, he was captured and was given a mock trial. He was hanged from a tree which is now called Sceach na gCloigeann (white thorn tree of the heads). The valley in which this occurred is known as Gleann an tSagairt (the priest's valley). A bell was found in a nearby field some years later. A brass cross was also found with no base, which had been painted black to prevent reflection of sunlight. For the year 2000 millennium celebrations, Mass was celebrated at the mass rock.

== Culture ==
The Esker Ballroom was once one of the most popular dance venues in the country. Built in 1947 on the Kilkerrin Road in Glenamaddy, the ballroom initially failed to get a license to hold dances or operate a bar. Eventually, in April 1949, the first dance was held in the ballroom. Further dances were held every second Sunday. In 1970, the Esker Ballroom closed as marquees, who were in direct competition with the ballroom, became more popular in the area. The building was sold and a night club was opened in its place.

The song "Four Country Roads", which mentions Glenamaddy, was a hit for Big Tom in Ireland in 1981.

== Education ==
Glenamaddy Community School was founded in 2002 by the Sisters of Mercy and County Galway VEC following the amalgamation of Coláiste Seosaimh and St. Benin's Vocational School.

== Sport ==
Glenamaddy C.L.G. is the local Gaelic Athletic Association club and plays Gaelic football. Glen Celtic is the local soccer club.

== Notable people ==
- Luke and Brian Comer, property developers, founders of Comer Group
- Jeremiah Mee (1889–1953), leader of the Listowel mutiny
