= Athleague =

Village in County Roscommon, Ireland

Athleague Áth Liag
- Village
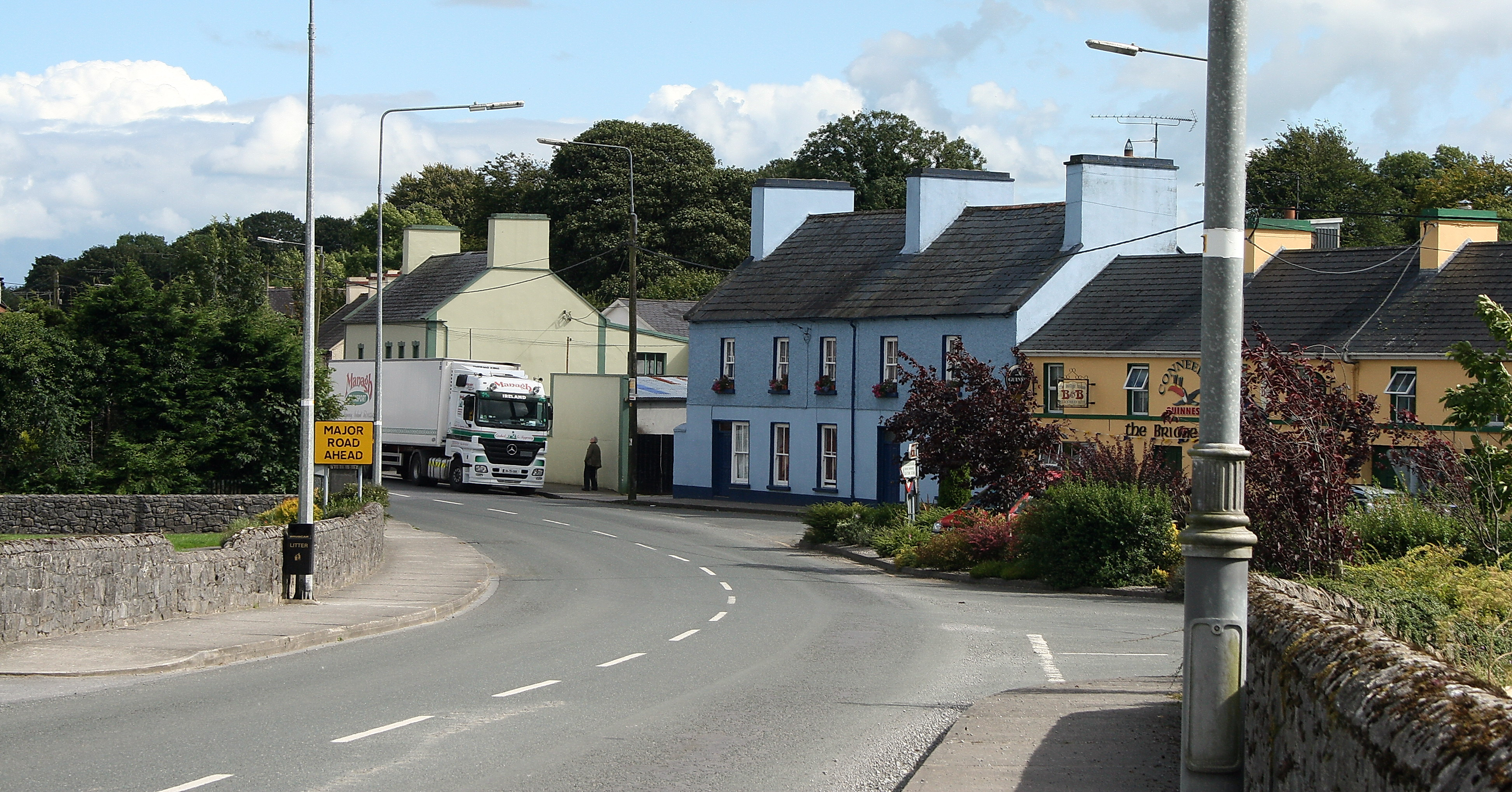

- Location in Ireland
- Coordinates: 53.567°N 8.253°W
- Country: Ireland
- Province: Connacht
- County: County Roscommon
- Elevation: 52 m (171 ft)

Population (2022)
  - Total: 296
- Irish Grid Reference: M826577

Athleague (Irish: Áth Liag (na Sioca), meaning 'ford of the flagstones') is a village and a parish in the Diocese of Elphin on the River Suck in the west of Ireland in County Roscommon, near the town of Roscommon. The village is in a townland and civil parish of the same name. As of the 2022 census, the village population was 296. The village is 8 km south-west of Roscommon town, at the junction of the N63 national route and the R362 regional road. The R357 leaves the N63 south of the village. The town has a mill and a restored church. The church is the local parish for the surrounding towns.

== History and name ==
Athleague's English name is derived from the Irish Áth Liag, meaning 'the ford of the flagstones', which indicates its use as a crossing point between the kingdoms of the Uí Maine and Uí Briúin.

Athleague's church was founded sometime around 500 by Maenucan Atha Liacc ('Maonagán of Athleague').

The area is mentioned a number of times in the Annals of Connacht, the Annals of Lough Cé and the Annals of the Four Masters. According to the Annals of Inisfallen, in the late 10th century ("AI993.2"), Brian Boru under took a "naval raid" in the area "he reached Breifne from Loch Rí by way of Áth Liac northwards".

== Cemetery ==
There were two graveyards in the parish of Athleague, one in the townland of Coolaspaddaun and one in that of Monasternalea. Monasternalea is sometimes referred to as Abbeygrey.

== Townlands ==
The civil parish of Athleague includes a number of townlands, a number of which abut the boundary between County Galway and County Roscommon:

- Coalpits in County Galway
- Coolaspaddaun with its cemetery
- Hollygrove in County Galway
- Monasternalea with its cemetery

== Notable people ==
- James Curley, Irish-American astronomer
- Thomas Curley, American politician

== See also ==
- List of towns and villages in Ireland
