= R332 road (Ireland) =

Road in Ireland

R332 road
- Bóthar R332

Route information
- Length: 38 km (24 mi)

Location
- Country: Ireland
- Primary destinations: County Galway; Horseleap Cross (N63 road); Barnaderg; Grange Bridge (Crosses the Grange River); Tuam (R347, N17, N83); Crosses the River Nanny; Crosses the River Clare; Kilbenan Cross Roads; Crosses the Western Railway Corridor; Bunagarraun; Blindwell; County Mayo; Cloghan's Hill; Knockroe; Kilmaine (N84 road)

Highway system
- Roads in Ireland; Motorways; Primary; Secondary; Regional

The R332 road is a regional road in County Galway and County Mayo in Ireland. It connects the N63 road at Horseleap Cross near Moylough in County Galway, via Tuam, to the N84 road at Kilmaine in County Mayo, 38 kilometres (24 mi) away (map of the route).

The government legislation that defines the R332, the Roads Act 1993 (Classification of Regional Roads) Order 2012 (Statutory Instrument 54 of 2012), provides the following official description:

Moylough — Tuam, County Galway — Kilmaine, County Mayo

Between its junction with N63 at Horseleap Cross and its junction with N17 at Abbey Trinity Road in the town of Tuam via Barnaderg, Grange Bridge; Dublin Road, Vicar Street, Market Square, High Street and Galway Road (and via Ballygaddy Road, Fosters Place and Shop Street) in the town of Tuam all in the county of Galway

and

between its junction with N17 at Saint Benins Terrace in the town of Tuam in the county of Galway and its junction with N84 at Kilmaine in the county of Mayo via Ballygaddy Road in the town of Tuam; Pollacorragune, Fartagar and Blindwell in the county of Galway: Knockroe and Milford Demesne in the county of Mayo.

== See also ==
- List of roads of County Mayo
- National primary road
- National secondary road
- Regional road
- Roads in Ireland
