= Belclare =

Village in County Galway, Ireland

Belclare Béal Chláir
- Village
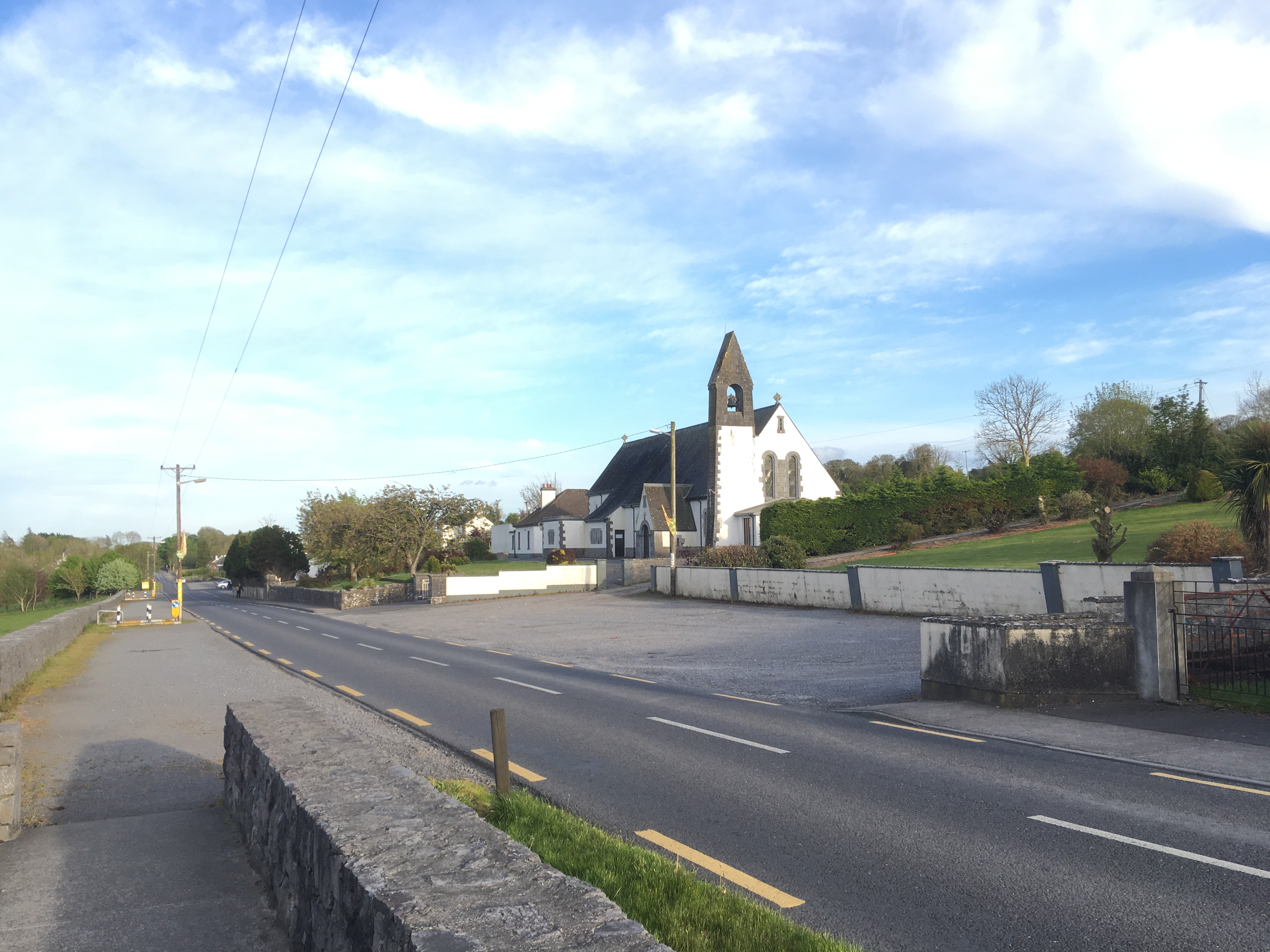
- Sacred Heart Church

- Location in Ireland
- Coordinates: 53.4923°N 8.9386°W
- Country: Ireland
- Province: Connacht
- County: County Galway
- Dáil Éireann: Galway East
- Eircode: H54
- Dialing code: +353 93

Belclare (Irish: Béal Chláir, meaning 'mouth of the plain') is a small village in County Galway, Ireland. The village is on the R333 road approximately 7 km (4 mi) from Tuam. It has a little parish church (The Church of the Sacred Heart), a small primary school, a shop, pub and post office, a community centre, a GAA pitch and a playground. The village is in a civil parish of the same name.

== Geography ==
Knockma Hill, also known as Castle Hackett hill, is situated 2 km (1.2 mi) west of the centre of Belclare. Legend has it that Finvarra, king of the Connacht Fairies, dwelled there. Maeve, the legendary Queen of Connacht, is reputed to be buried in the Cairn on the summit of the hill - from there are panoramic views.

Belclare is part of the parish of Corofin.

== Politics ==
Mark Killilea Jnr, the Fianna Fáil politician noted for describing supporters of his party as "people who eat their dinner in the middle of the day", lived in Belclare and died at his home there.

Current TD for Galway East, Seán Canney is from Belclare.

== Sport ==
As part of the parish of Corofin, its parish Gaelic football team won the All-Ireland Senior Club Football Championship in 1998 (defeating Erin's Isle), 2015 (defeating Slaughtneil). They also won the 2018 Championship (defeating Nemo Rangers), the 2019 Championship (defeating Dr Crokes) and the 2020 Championship (defeating Kilcoo) to become the first club team to win three finals in a row.

== Popular culture ==
The 1969 film, Alfred the Great, was filmed in the Castlehackett area. The 1998 film, A Very Unlucky Leprechaun, starring Warwick Davis and Tim Matheson, was filmed at Castlehackett House and Knockma. The 2004 TV series Foreign Exchange, starring Zachary Garred and Lynn Styles, was filmed at Castlehackett House which was called "O'Keeffe's College" in the series.

The Countdown champion Kevin Steede (who appeared in Series 72 which aired on Britain's Channel 4 in 2015), is originally from Belclare. Steede studied occupational therapy at the University of Plymouth, having earlier attended St Jarlath's College and NUI Galway locally.

== Gallery ==
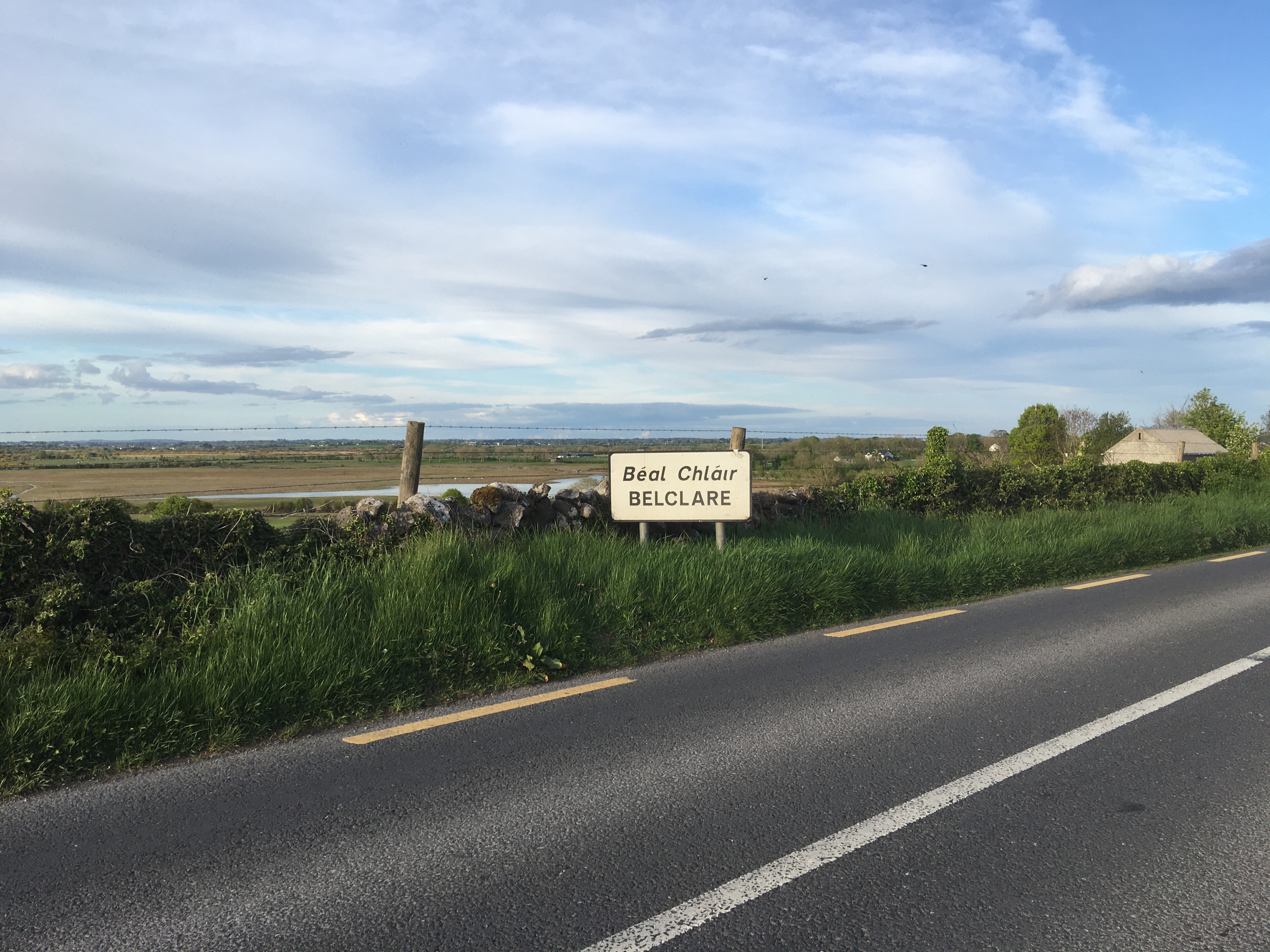
Welcome signage at Belclare

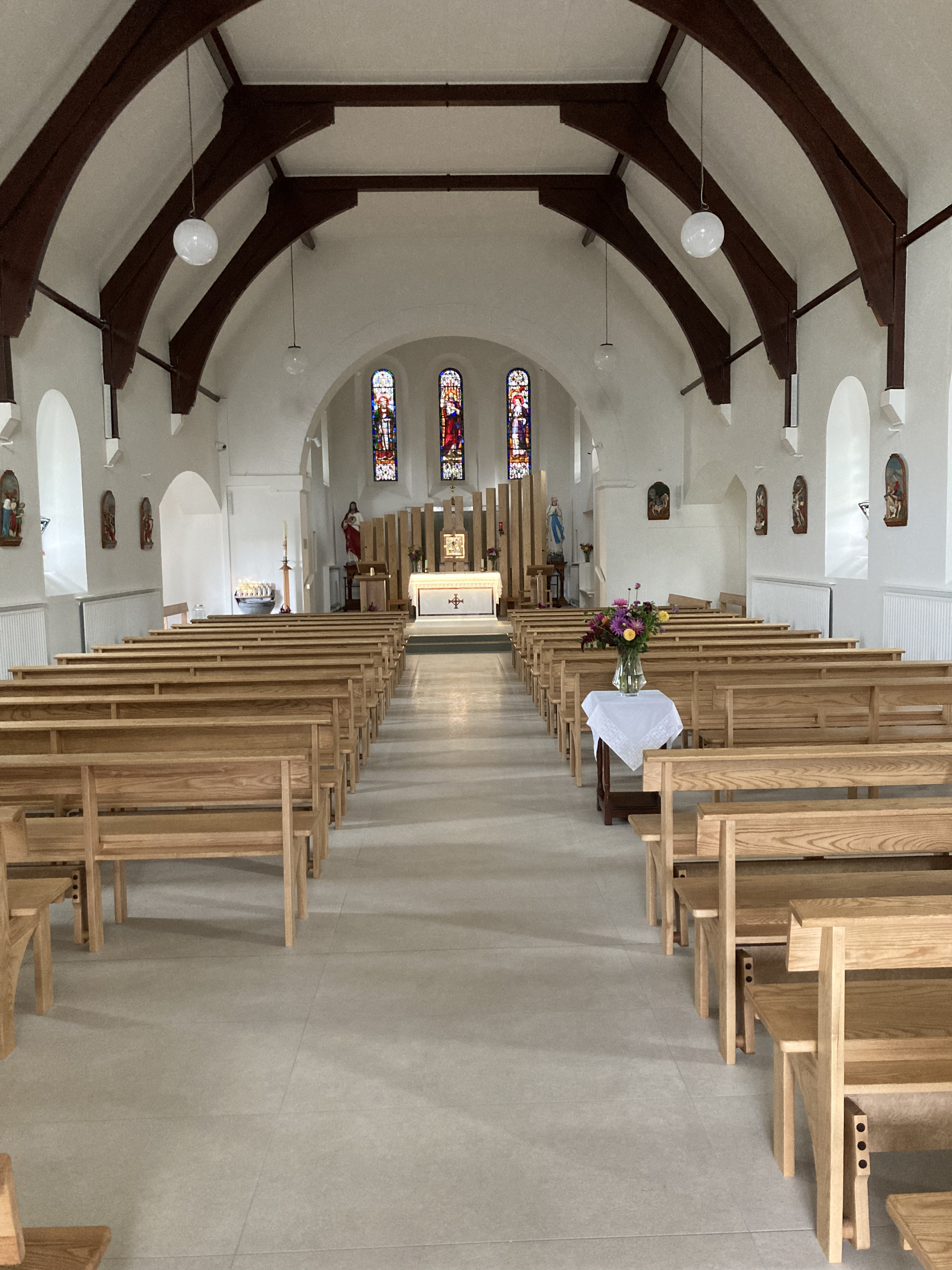
Sacred Heart Church August 2023

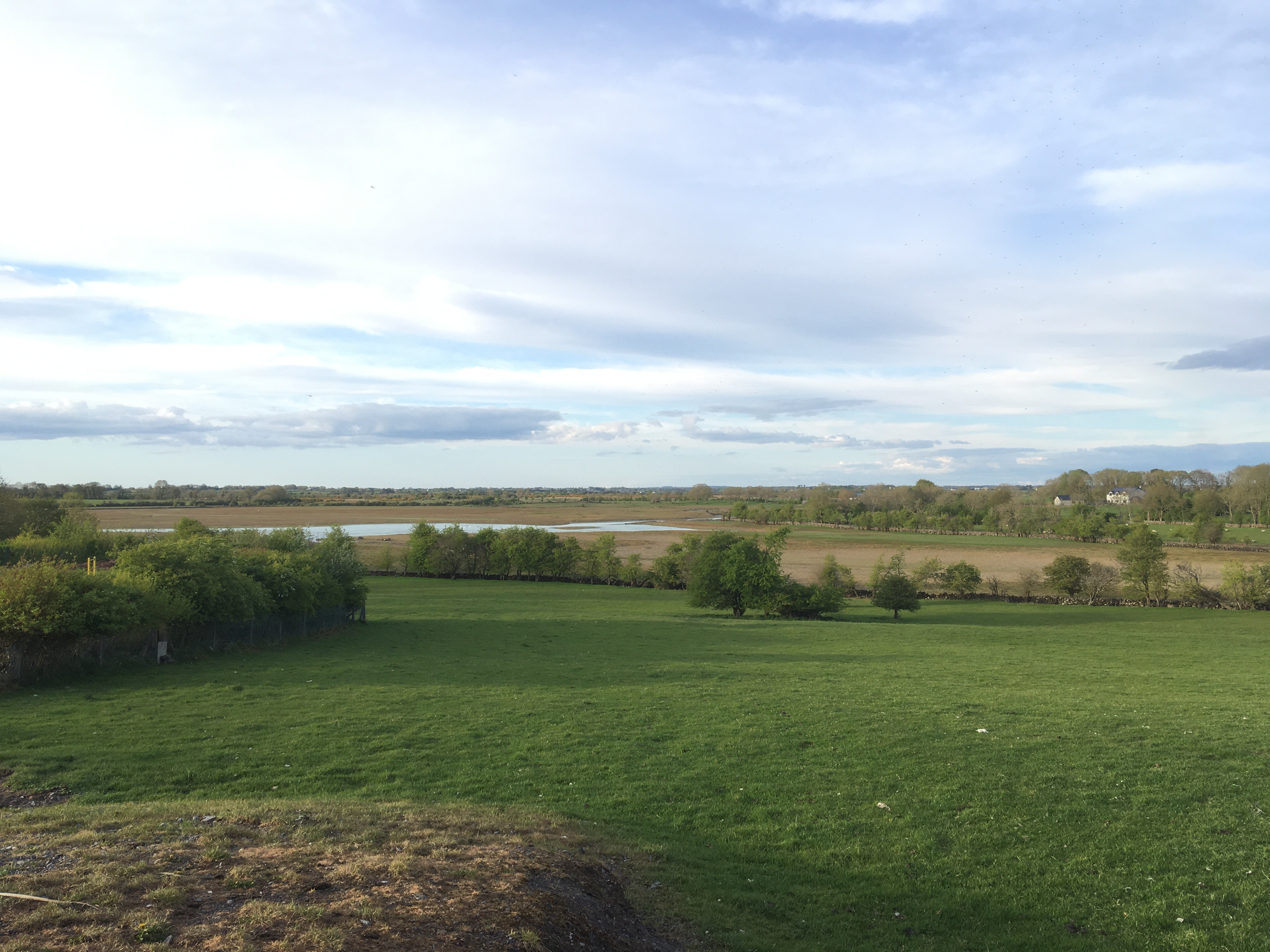
View of the turlough from Belclare

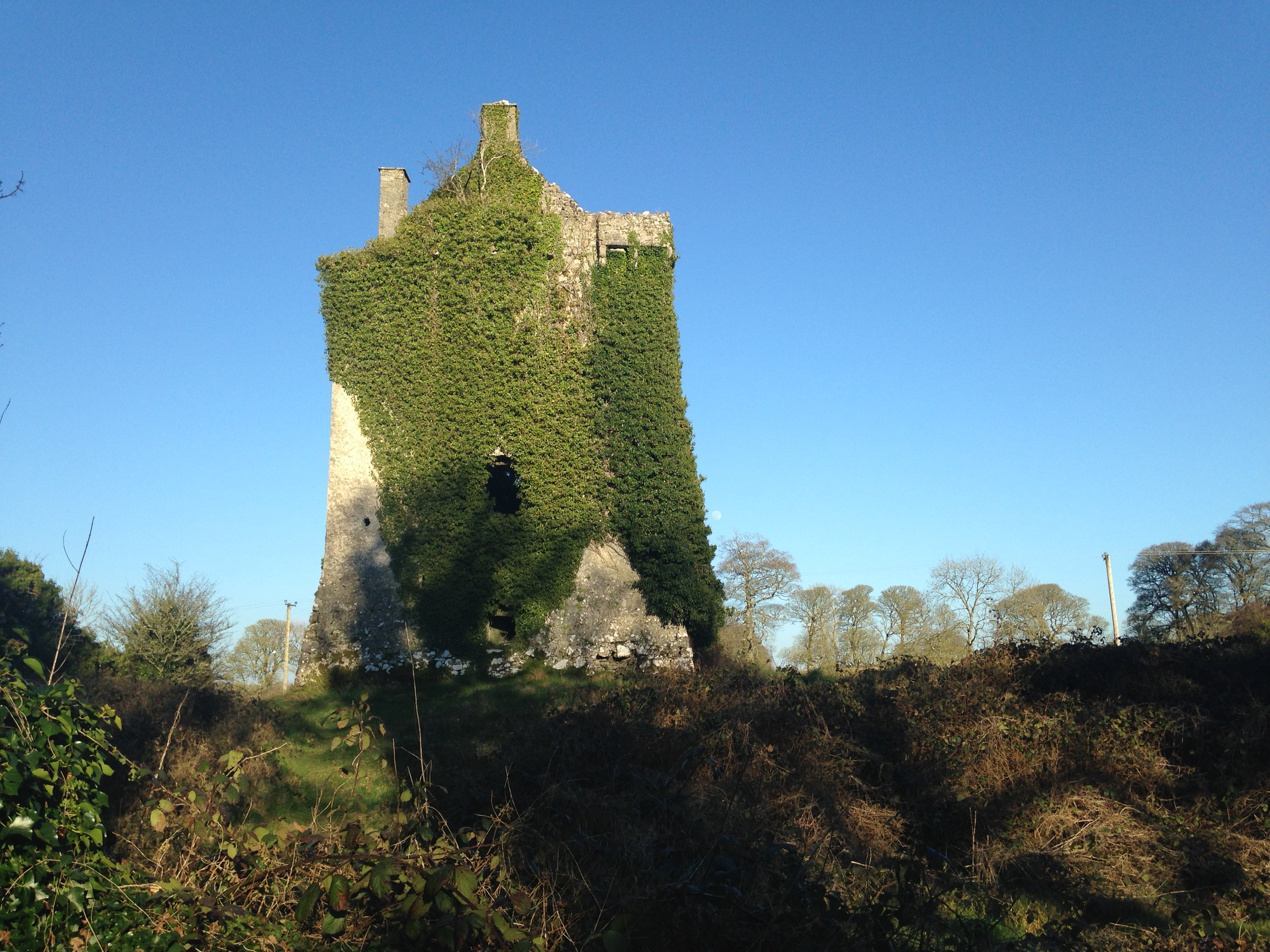
Ruins of Castle Hackett at Knockma Hill

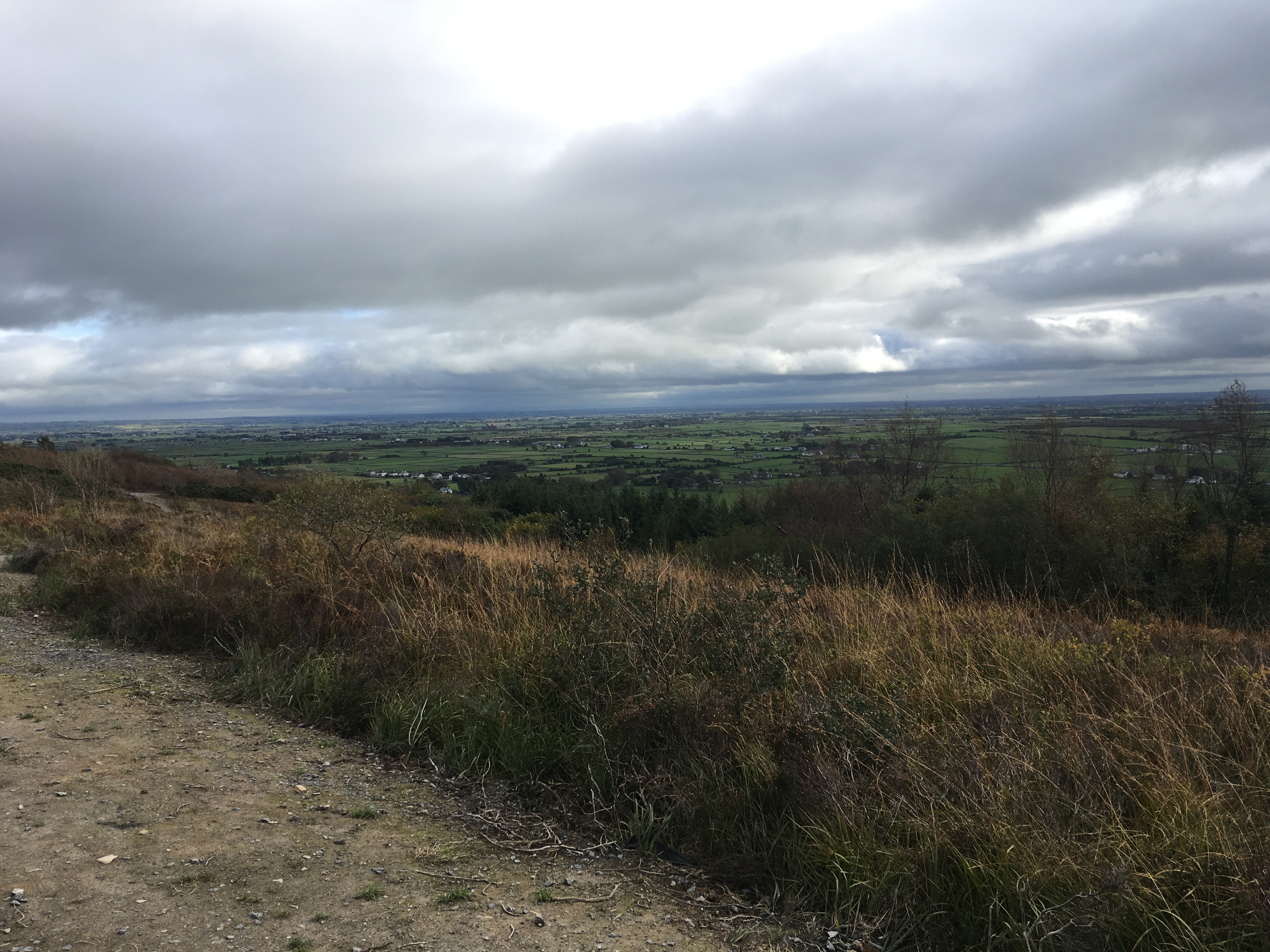
View from the top of Knockma Hill
