= Cloontuskert =

Village in County Roscommon, Ireland

Cloontuskert Cluain Tuaiscirt
- Village
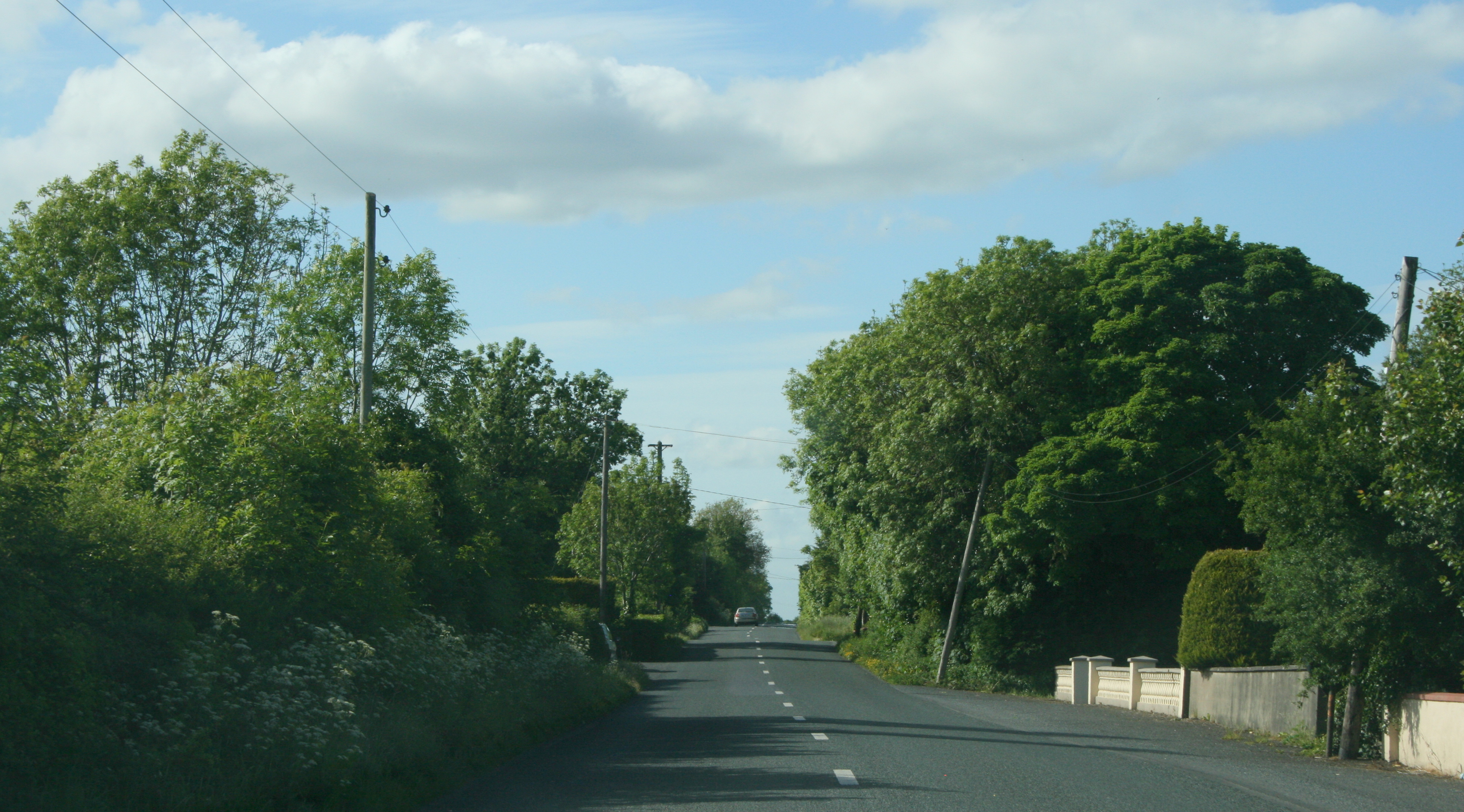
- The R371 regional road south of Cloontuskert

- Location in Ireland
- Coordinates: 53°42′0″N 8°00′44″W
- Country: Ireland
- Province: Connacht
- County: County Roscommon
- Barony: Ballintober South

Population (2022)
  - Total: 179

Cloontuskert (Irish: Cluain Tuaiscirt) is a village, townland and civil parish in County Roscommon, Ireland. The village is on the R371 road, about 3 kilometres (2 mi) north-west of Lanesborough. The population was 179 at the 2022 census. The village mainly developed, beginning in 1953, as housing for Bord na Móna employees working on the surrounding boglands.

== Notable people ==
- Anne McLoughlin (born c. 1960), Irish aid worker and hostage
