= Clare (barony) =

Barony in County Galway, Ireland

Clare Baile Chláir (Irish)
- Barony
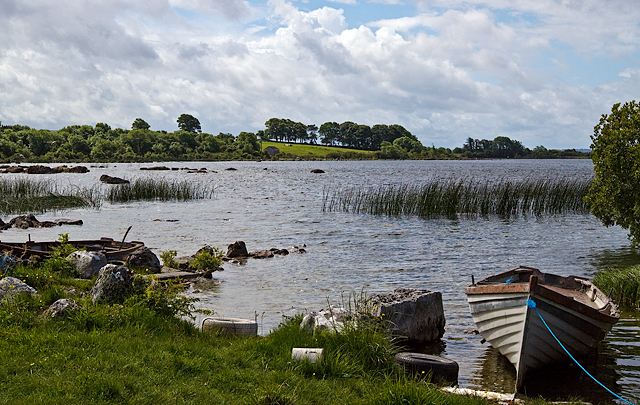
- East bank of Lough Corrib

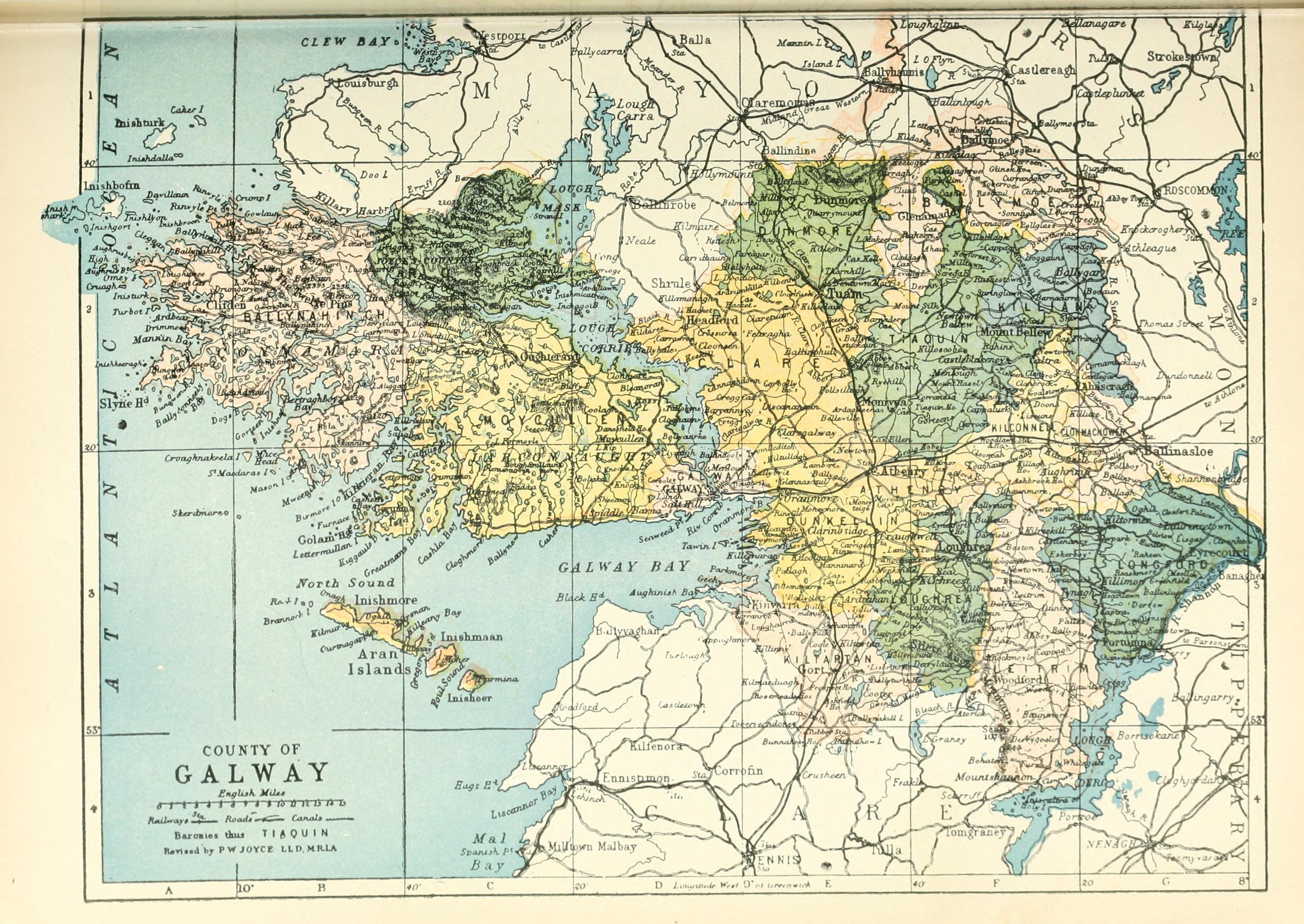
- Barony map of County Galway, 1900; Clare is in the middle, coloured orange.

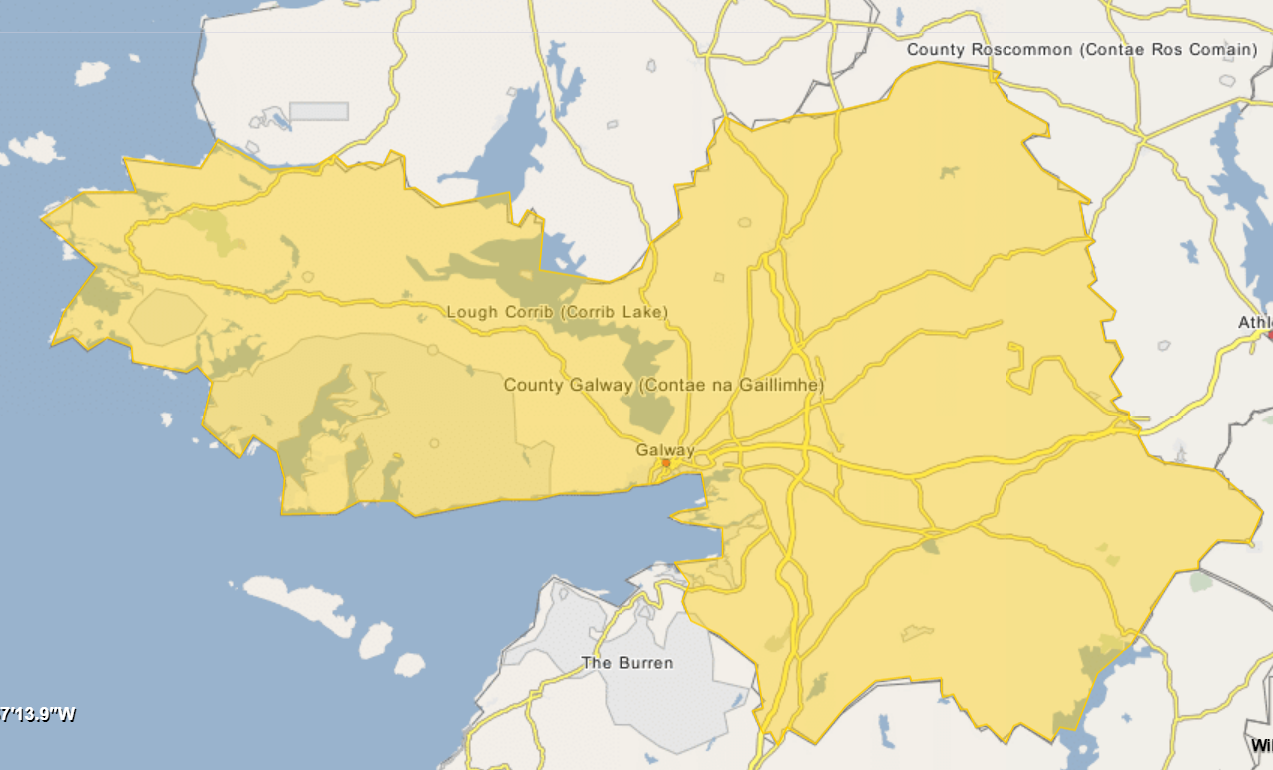
- Location within County Galway
- Coordinates: 53°26′N 8°55′W
- Sovereign state: Ireland
- Province: Connacht
- County: Galway

Area
  - Total: 515.9 km^{2} (199.2 sq mi)

Clare (Irish: Baile Chláir) is a historical barony in north-central County Galway, Ireland.

Baronies were mainly cadastral rather than administrative units. They acquired modest local taxation and spending functions in the 19th century before being superseded by the Local Government (Ireland) Act 1898.

== History ==
The Ó Flaithbheartaigh (Flahertys) were chiefs of a region called Clan Murcadha (also Muintir Murchada, Mag Seola), while their relatives the Mac Aedha (MacHugh) ruled a territory called Clan Coscraigh on the east side of Lough Corrib, roughly corresponding to Clare barony. The Norman family of Hackett built a castle in the area in the 13th century.

In the 16th century, Richard Burke, 2nd Earl of Clanricarde drove the O'Flaherties from their lands.

Clare barony was created some time before 1574. It is named for the town of Claregalway (Irish: Baile Chláir, "settlement of the plain").

== Geography ==
Clare is in the north of the county, east of Lough Corrib and north of the River Clare.

== List of settlements ==
Settlements within the historical barony of Clare include:

- Abbeyknockmoy
- Belclare
- Claregalway
- Corrandulla
- Headford
- Tuam (part)
