= Killashee, County Longford =

Village in County Longford, Ireland

Killashee Irish: Cill na Sí
- Village
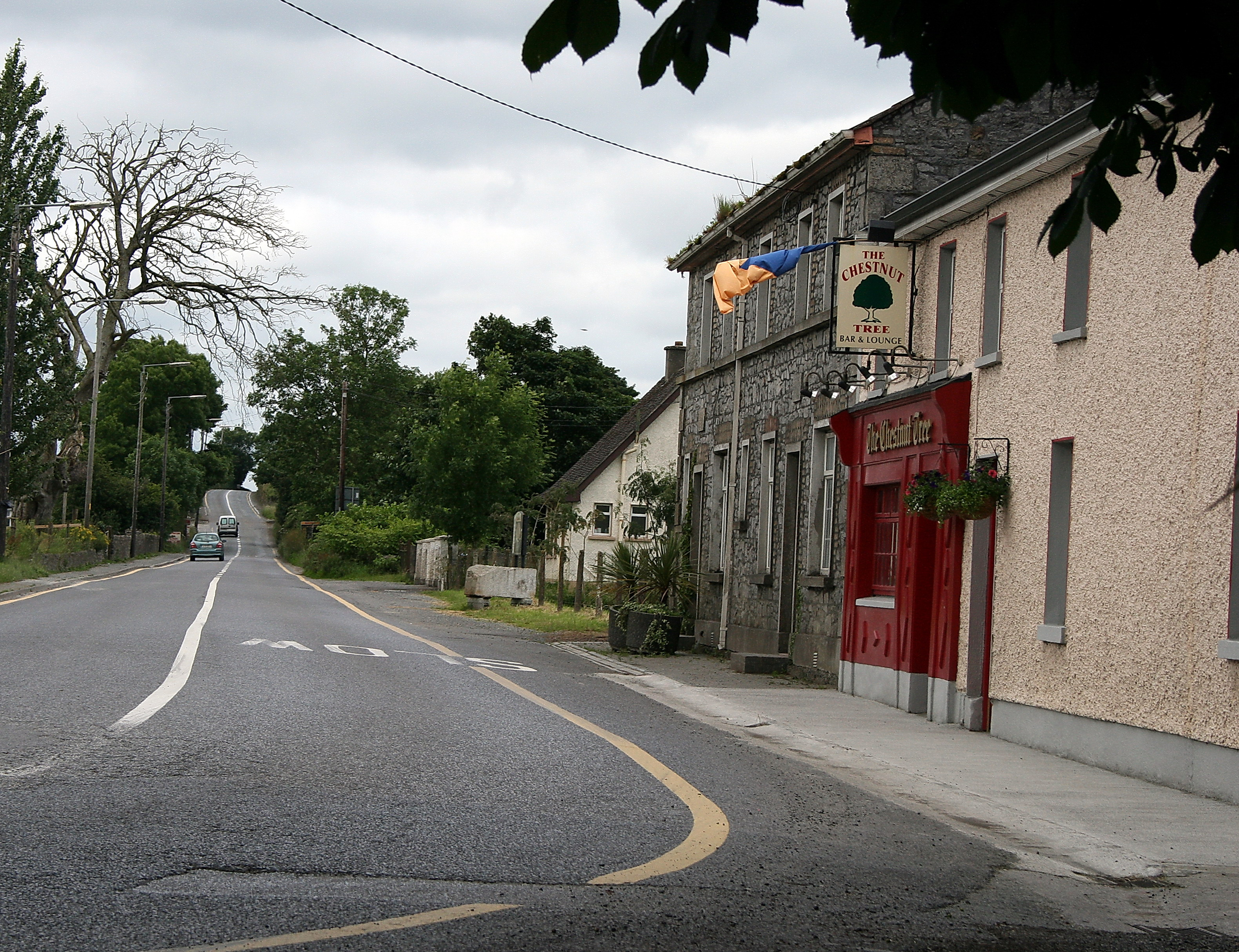
- N63 towards Longford at Killashee

- Location in Ireland
- Coordinates: 53.6815°N 7.8804°W
- Country: Ireland
- Province: Leinster
- County: County Longford
- Elevation: 54 m (177 ft)

Population (2016)
  - Total: 215
- Irish Grid Reference: N075702

Killashee (Irish: Cill na Sí) is a village in County Longford, Ireland. It is situated on the N63 midway between Lanesborough and Longford, near the Royal Canal and 8 km (5.0 mi) east of the River Shannon. The village is in a townland and civil parish of the same name.

== Sport ==
Killashee is home to St. Brigid's Killashee GAA, the team currently competes in the Longford Intermediate Football Championship. Killashee has produced some inter-county players through the years. Killashee had an international player who represented Ireland in the Shinty-Hurling International Series in 2018.

== Location and transport ==
The village is situated along the N63 road between Claregalway and Longford and is 8 kilometres south of Longford town. The closest airport to the Killashee is the Abbeyshrule Aerodrome located 33 kilometres south-east of the village, the closest major airport is Ireland West Airport in Charlestown, County Mayo, 91 kilometres north-west of Killashee.

Killashee is served by two Bus Éireann routes. Route 425 provides a weekday service each way to/from Galway via Lanesboro and Roscommon. Route 467 provides two journeys each way to Longford and Lanesboro on Wednesday.

== See also ==
- List of towns and villages in Ireland
