= Cloonboo =

Village in County Galway, Ireland

Cloonboo Cluain Bú
- Village
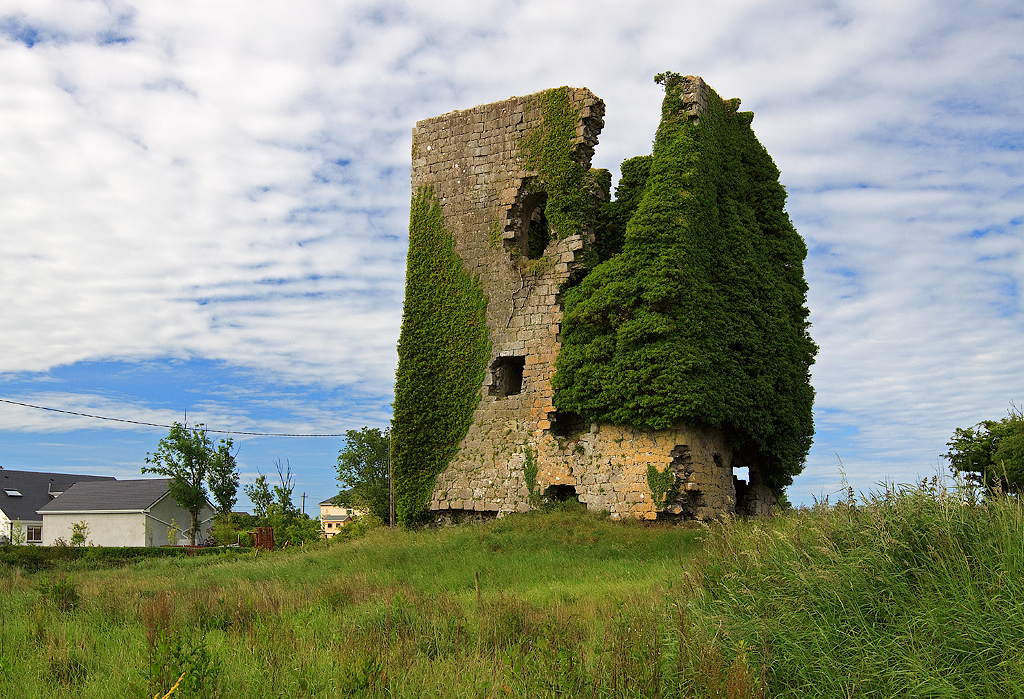
- Cloonboo Castle

- Location in Ireland
- Coordinates: 53°22′34″N 9°0′46″W
- Country: Ireland
- Province: Connacht
- County: County Galway

Population (2022)
  - Total: 484
- Time zone: UTC+0 (WET)
  - Summer (DST): UTC-1 (IST (WEST))

Cloonboo (Irish: Cluain Bú), also Clonboo, is a village in County Galway, Ireland. It is 14 km north of Galway city centre, on the N84 Galway to Castlebar road.

Cloonboo is in the civil parish of Annaghdown, in the barony of Clare.

== In popular culture ==
In the Netflix series House of Guinness, Cloonboo is depicted as a rural community located in County Galway that is part of the Guinness estates around Ashford Castle, County Mayo. It is the site of scenes in which Anne suffers a miscarriage and where social and economic inequalities in rural Ireland are dramatised. Though set in Galway, the scenes for Cloonboo were filmed in Snowdonia, Wales.
