= R333 road (Ireland) =

Road in Ireland

R333 road
- Bóthar R333

Location
- Country: Ireland
- Primary destinations: County Galway; Leaves the N83 southwest of Tuam; Belclare; Castlehackett; Stonepark; Caherlistrane; Donaghpatrick; Terminates at a junction with the N84 in Headford

Highway system
- Roads in Ireland; Motorways; Primary; Secondary; Regional

The R333 road is a regional road in Ireland connecting the N83 southwest of Tuam, County Galway, to the N84 in Headford, County Galway.

== See also ==
- Roads in Ireland
- National primary road
- National secondary road
