= Ballintober South =

Barony (land unit) in County Roscommon, Ireland

Ballintober South Baile an Tobair Theas (Irish)
- Barony
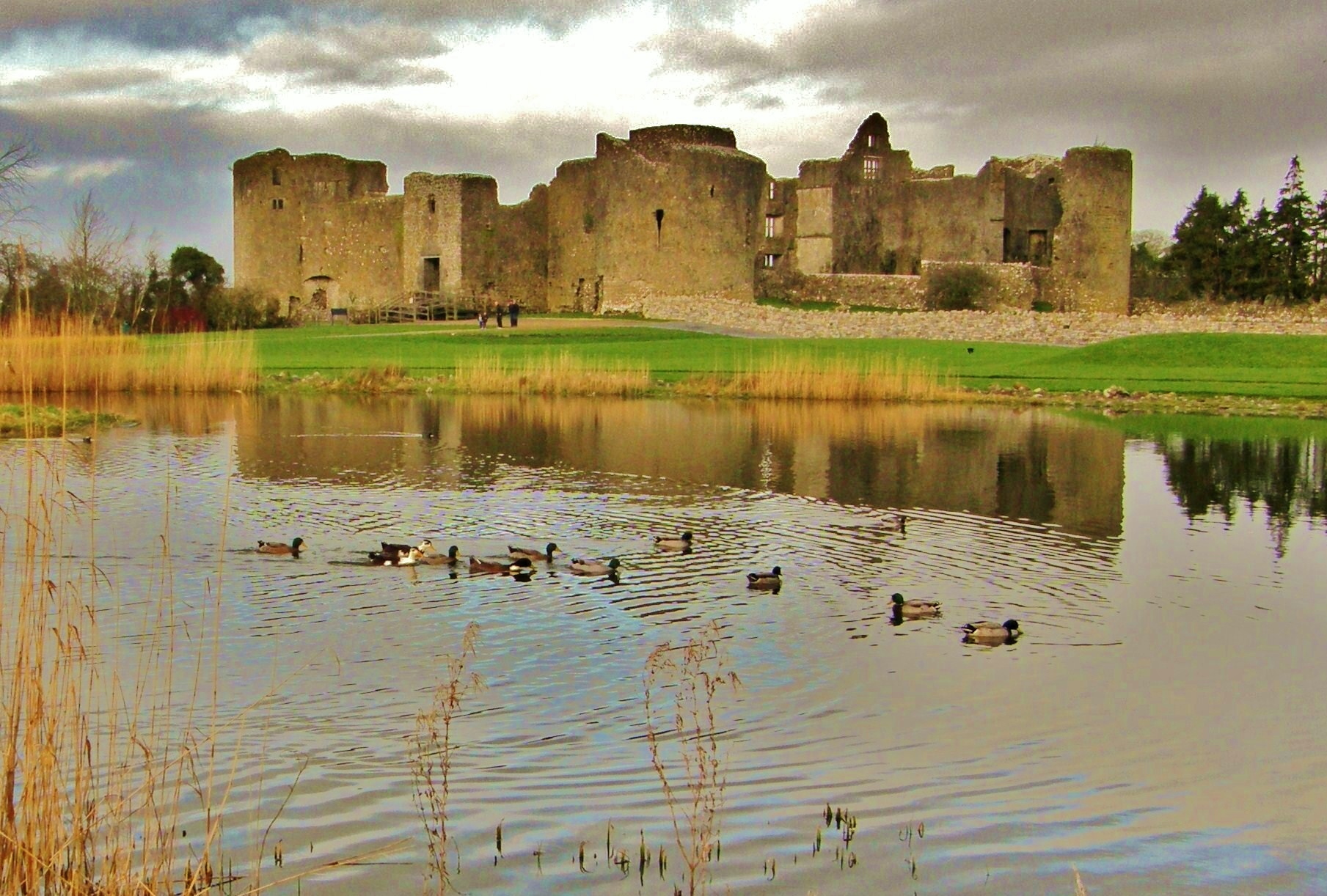
- The Castle, Roscommon town, Ballintober South

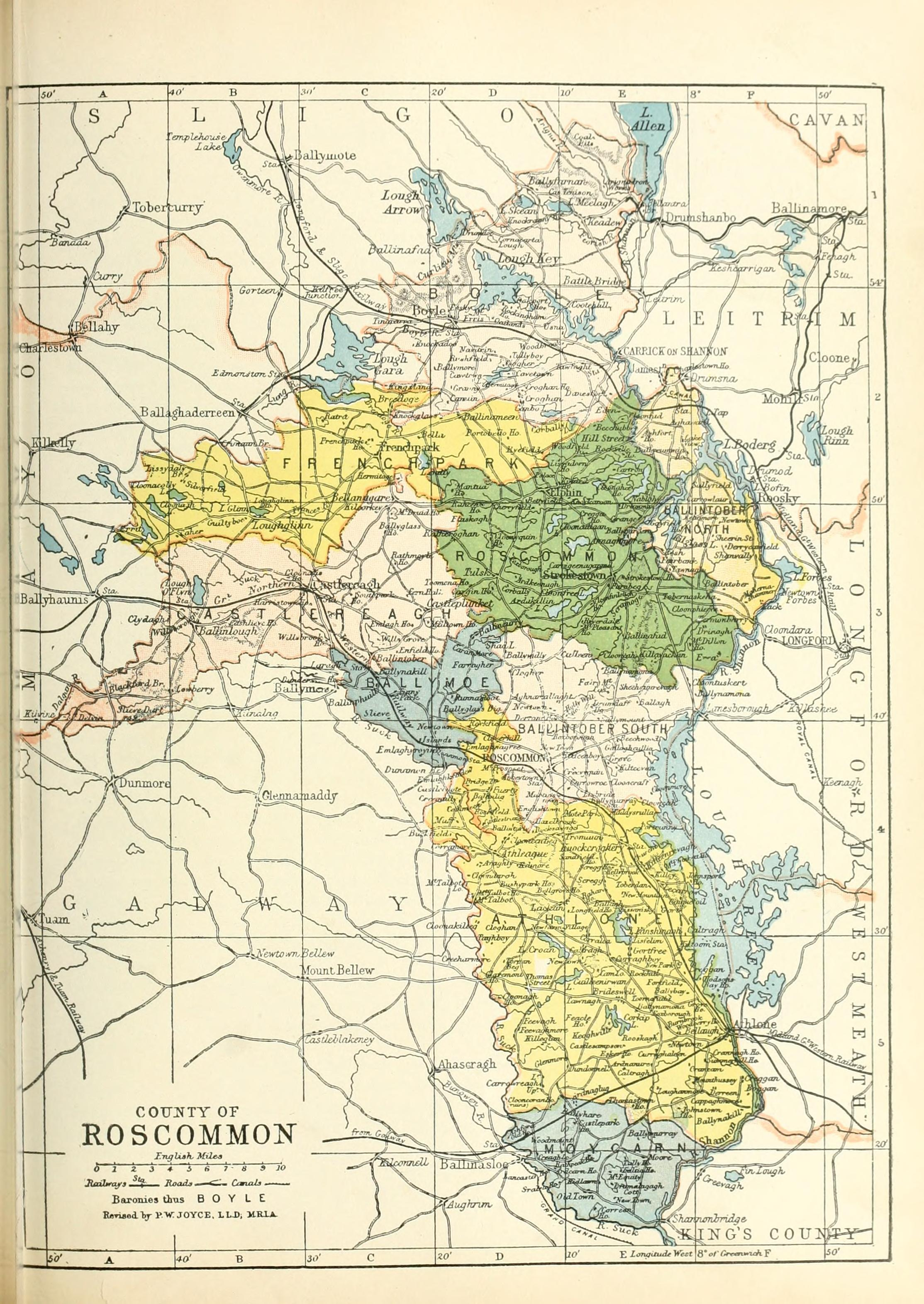
- Barony map of County Roscommon, 1900; Ballintober South is coloured peach, in the centre.
- Sovereign state: Ireland
- Province: Connacht
- County: Roscommon

Area
  - Total: 194.71 km^{2} (75.18 sq mi)

Ballintober South (Irish: Baile an Tobair Theas), also called Ballintober West, is a barony in County Roscommon, Ireland.

== Etymology ==
Ballintober South is named after Ballintober town; however, it does not actually contain that town, which is located in Castlereagh barony.

== Geography ==
Ballintober South is located in the centre of County Roscommon, northwest of Lough Ree.

== History ==
The Ó Manacháin (O'Monaghans) were lords of the "Three Tuathas", and in AD 866 were rulers of this area, known as Ui Briuin na Sionna (O'Brien of the Shannon). In 1249, they were overthrown by the O'Beirnes (Ó Birn).

The O'Mooneys were chiefs of Clann-Murthuile, also believed to be in Ballintober South.

== List of settlements ==
Below is a list of settlements in Ballintober South:

- Cloontuskert
- Kilteevan
- Roscommon
