= Jonathan Mullin =

Irish journalist, former footballer and coach

- Born: 1978 (age 47–48); Frenchbrook, Kilmaine, County Mayo
- Education: Corporate law Higher Diploma in Applied Communications
- Alma mater: NUI Galway
- Occupation: Sports journalist
- Notable credit: ESB National Media Award for Provincial/Regional Sport Print (2004)

Jonathan Mullin (born 1978) is an Irish journalist, former footballer and coach. He is current editor of the Irish version of the Racing Post. He was previously Gaelic Games Correspondent for RTÉ Television News, the first person to hold this role. Mullin has worked for several local and national publications, including as one of the first journalists with both The Athlone Voice and the Irish Daily Mail. His specific interests are horse racing and Gaelic games.

== Journalism ==
Mullin is originally from Frenchbrook, Kilmaine, County Mayo. He studied corporate law at NUI Galway. During his free time he worked with MidWest Radio and The Connaught Telegraph. A career change of mind prompted him to take the Higher Diploma in Applied Communications at NUIG around 2001. He then worked as a Sports Sub-editor with the Evening Echo before working for a year as a sports reporter with The Mayo News, sports editor of fledgling publication The Athlone Voice from September 2003 until 2006, then deputy sports editor with the fledgling Irish Daily Mail before applying for the RTÉ job. Mullin began working for the RTÉ News Sports Unit in October 2006.

He received the ESB National Media Award for Provincial/Regional Sport Print in 2004 for covering Westmeath's first Leinster Senior Football Championship title win.

In February 2010, he announced his departure from RTÉ to become the Irish Racing Post's editor. He took up the role in March 2010.

== Coaching and playing career ==
Mullin played in the minor grade for Mayo, winning a medal in the 1996 Connacht Minor Football Championship. He was coach and joint-manager of the county's ladies' football team between 1998 and 2001, guiding them to two All-Ireland Senior Football Championship titles, as well as to a National Football League title. Mullin has also played for Mayo in association football.
