= Alfred the Great (film) =

Alfred the Great!
- Directed by: Clive Donner
- Written by: James R. Webb; Ken Taylor
- Produced by: Bernard Smith
- Starring: David Hemmings; Michael York; Prunella Ransome; Colin Blakely; Ian McKellen; Peter Vaughan; Alan Dobie; Julian Glover; Vivien Merchant
- Cinematography: Alex Thomson
- Edited by: Fergus McDonell
- Music by: Raymond Leppard
- Distributed by: Metro-Goldwyn-Mayer
- Release date: 14 July 1969
- Running time: 122 minutes
- Country: United Kingdom
- Language: English
- Budget: $6 million
- Box office: $197,788 (US)

Alfred the Great is a 1969 British epic historical drama film directed by Clive Donner and starring David Hemmings, Michael York, Prunella Ransome and Colin Blakely. It was written by James R. Webb and Ken Taylor. The film portrays Alfred the Great's struggle to defend the Anglo-Saxon Kingdom of Wessex from a Danish Viking invasion in the 9th century. David Hemmings starred in the title role.

== Plot ==
When the Vikings invade England, Alfred is about to take his priesthood vows. However, his brother, King Æthelred of Wessex, summons him to his aid and Alfred leaves for battle, where he appears to be a great tactician. Æthelred dies shortly after Alfred marries the Mercian princess Aelhswith. Torn between following intellect or passion, Alfred at first refuses to succeed Æthelred and consummate his marriage, but is forced to accept kingship after the Danes attack again.

Realising the weak position of Wessex, Alfred goes into negotiations with Guthrum, the Danish Viking leader of the Kingdom of East Anglia. Aelhswith on the other hand agrees to become Guthrum's hostage and they start to develop feelings for each other.

Alfred has difficulty acting like a king, calling for obedience and egalitarianism in the Medieval society of three estates, which the fighting nobility does not appreciate. The cleric Asser warns him that he is too proud and, later, the Danes defeat Alfred. The latter is forced to retreat to the fens of Somerset. Roger's bandits, who take Alfred in, are more loyal to Alfred than his noblemen.

The nobles, however, drop their regicide plans and support Alfred in the climactic Battle of Athelney. Roger sees that Alfred will need help and as the battle rages he arrives with monks, old men and peasant women, armed with clubs and pitchforks. Alfred defeats Guthrum, knocking him out, but decides to spare his life and forgives Aelhswith.

== Cast ==
- David Hemmings as Alfred the Great
- Michael York as Guthrum
- Prunella Ransome as Aelhswith
- Colin Blakely as Asser
- Ian McKellen as Roger
- Peter Vaughan as Burrud
- Alan Dobie as Ethelred of Wessex
- Julian Glover as Athelstan
- Vivien Merchant as Freda
- Julian Chagrin as Ivar the Boneless
- Jim Norton as Thanet
- Christopher Timothy as Cedric
- Sinéad Cusack as Edith
- Barry Evans as Ingild
- Peter Blythe as Eafa
- Michael Billington as Offa
- Robin Askwith as shepherd boy

== Production ==
=== Development ===
Producer Bernie Smith says he became interested in Alfred the Great after reading about him in Winston Churchill's History of the English Speaking Peoples.

The film was announced in March 1964 as A King Is Born. It was "suggested" by a novel by Eleanor Shipley Duckett from a script by James R. Webb, who had written How the West Was Won for Smith. Filming was to take place in Ireland, with MGM financing. However, it took a number of years for the film to be made. Peter O'Toole was mentioned as a possible lead. According to Clive Donner, Richard Burton was discussed as a possibility but the producer did not want him as he felt the actor was too old to play Alfred. In February 1967, the lead role was given to David Hemmings, who had appeared in MGM's Blowup. "MGM felt he was a star," said Donner later.

Bernie Smith said he "wanted a director who had never done a historical. That way I knew we could minimise cliches and the possibility of someone simply repeating, imitating what went before." Clive Donner, then best known for What's New Pussycat?, was hired in September 1967, and Michael Killanin became associate producer. Donner said he wanted to make the film "because of the inherent youth problem which is so close to our so-called youth revolt; turning the destructiveness of youth into constructiveness. Like so many students today, he [Alfred] advocated peace, but at the same time proclaimed violence in order to redo the world."

Donner was unhappy with the original script by James R. Webb, who he said was too "old Hollywood". He had it rewritten by Ken Taylor. Donner said he spent several years on the project; "I put my heart and soul into it."

=== Filming ===
The film was shot in County Galway, Ireland, including locations such as Castle Hackett in Tuam, Kilchreest, Ross Lake, and Cnoc Meadha.

Christopher Timothy, (who later became famous for his character in the television series 'All Creatures Great and Small'), played Cedric and in 1993 related on the BBC Radio 4 programme 'Hoax' how he attempted to learn to ride for the film.

Many resources went into replicating the 9th century AD, turning parts of County Galway into Wessex. This included a 200-foot-long hill figure of a white horse near Cnoc Meadha, representing the Uffington White Horse in Berkshire. Members of the Irish military served as extras during the battle scenes filmed in Counties Galway and Westmeath.

Mary J. Murphy discussed the film's production and reasons for its flopping in the 2008 book Viking Summer, the filming of Alfred the Great in Galway in 1968.

=== Post production ===
According to Donner, he was protected from the excesses of James T. Aubrey at MGM, by the then head of production, Herb Solow. The director says Margaret Booth was very helpful in assisting the editing of the movie.

== Release ==
The film had a Royal world premiere on 14 July 1969 at the Empire, Leicester Square in London.

The movie was not a commercial success.

== Reception ==
The Monthly Film Bulletin wrote: "As with The Lion in Winter, 20th century expressions and intonations flow uneasily from mediaeval or, here, pre-mediaeval Early English lips, so that crucial dramatic highlights become unintentionally merely risible. ... The atmosphere in Alfred the Great is frequently like that of a Danes versus Brits rugby match, with the Danes producing their inane chanting war cry before battle, Captain Alfred and his team heaving and panting, covered in sweat and blood and post-battle glory, and the King of Mercia looking for all the world like the prop-forward in the Jock Strapp ensemble on the Rugby Songs record sleeve. ... The Danes are hippy flower-children turned on by draughts of blood and tending to an excess of carousing, wenching and torture. ... One thing is certain: Donner has only one course – upwards – out of this abyss."

Kine Weekly wrote: "It is a tale of primitive people who talk in a sophisticated way but the battles that erupt every so often are impressively virile and gory in glorious colour. There is plenty of explicit violence and the interim is filled with far more contemporary style love-making than is usual in this kind of historical romance. This slows the pace and dulls the adventure."

== See also ==
- List of historical drama films
