= Colm O'Connell =

Irish missionary and athletics coach

Brother Colm O'Connell FSP
Personal information
- Born: William O'Connell; 18 August 1948 (age 77) Caherduggan, Mallow, County Cork, Ireland

Personal life
- Education: University College Galway

Religious life
- Religion: Christianity
- Denomination: Roman Catholicism
- Order: Patrician Brothers

Colm O'Connell, FSP (born 18 August 1948) is an Irish Catholic religious brother, missionary and athletics coach. He is often referred to as "The Godfather of Kenyan running". He is a member of the Patrician Brothers.

== Career ==
O'Connell is originally from Caherduggan, Mallow, County Cork. He joined the Patrician Brothers at the age of 14, training in Tullow, County Carlow, and went on to study at National University of Ireland in Galway, formerly University College Galway. He spent two years in the Patrician Secondary School, Newbridge, County Kildare before departing Ireland for the Great Rift Valley in Kenya in 1976 to teach geography at St. Patrick's High School in Iten, Keiyo District, Rift Valley Province in Kenya. He came to Iten expecting to stay just three months. He has lived in Iten ever since.

Despite having no coaching background, he began helping aspiring young athletes and he took over training athletes from Peter Foster, brother of British runner Brendan Foster. Today, he has 120 training camps and is known as "the Godfather of Kenyan running". His work with the youth has included track and field training. Twenty five of his students have gone on to become world champions, and four have won Olympic gold medals.

His students include Edna Kiplagat, Florence Kiplagat, Lornah Kiplagat, Linet Masai, Mary Keitany, Ibrahim Kipkemboi Hussein, Peter Rono, Matthew Birir, Sammy Tirop, Haron Lagat, Janeth Jepkosgei, Viola Kibiwott, Brimin Kipruto, Joseph Tengelei, Isaac Songok, Wilson Boit, Vivian Cheruiyot, Michael Kipyego, Augustine Kiprono Choge, Wilson Kipketer, David Rudisha, and Rhonex Kipruto. O'Connell is credited in starting the influx of female athletes to Iten in the early 1990s when he trained and hosted World Champion Sally Barsosio, Rose Cheruiyot and world junior champion Lydia Cheromei.

== Awards ==
In 2001, O'Connell was awarded an honorary MA from NUI Galway for his services to Africa and to Athletics. Credit to his work as a coach is covered in "the 'Man on a Mission' - O'Connell and the rise of Kenyan Athletics" by Jamie D'Alton and Anne McLoughlin documentary. The documentary Man on a Mission was presented by Irish former athlete, and now senator, Eamon Coghlan.

In 2012, O'Connell was awarded an honorary doctorate by Dublin City University. Olympic and World Champion David Rudisha joined him on the trip to Ireland, visiting Galway, Mallow and Newbridge.

O'Connell was awarded an Irish Presidential Distinguished Service Award for Arts, Culture & Sport in 2021.
