= N63 road (Ireland) =

Road in Ireland

N63 road
- Bóthar N63
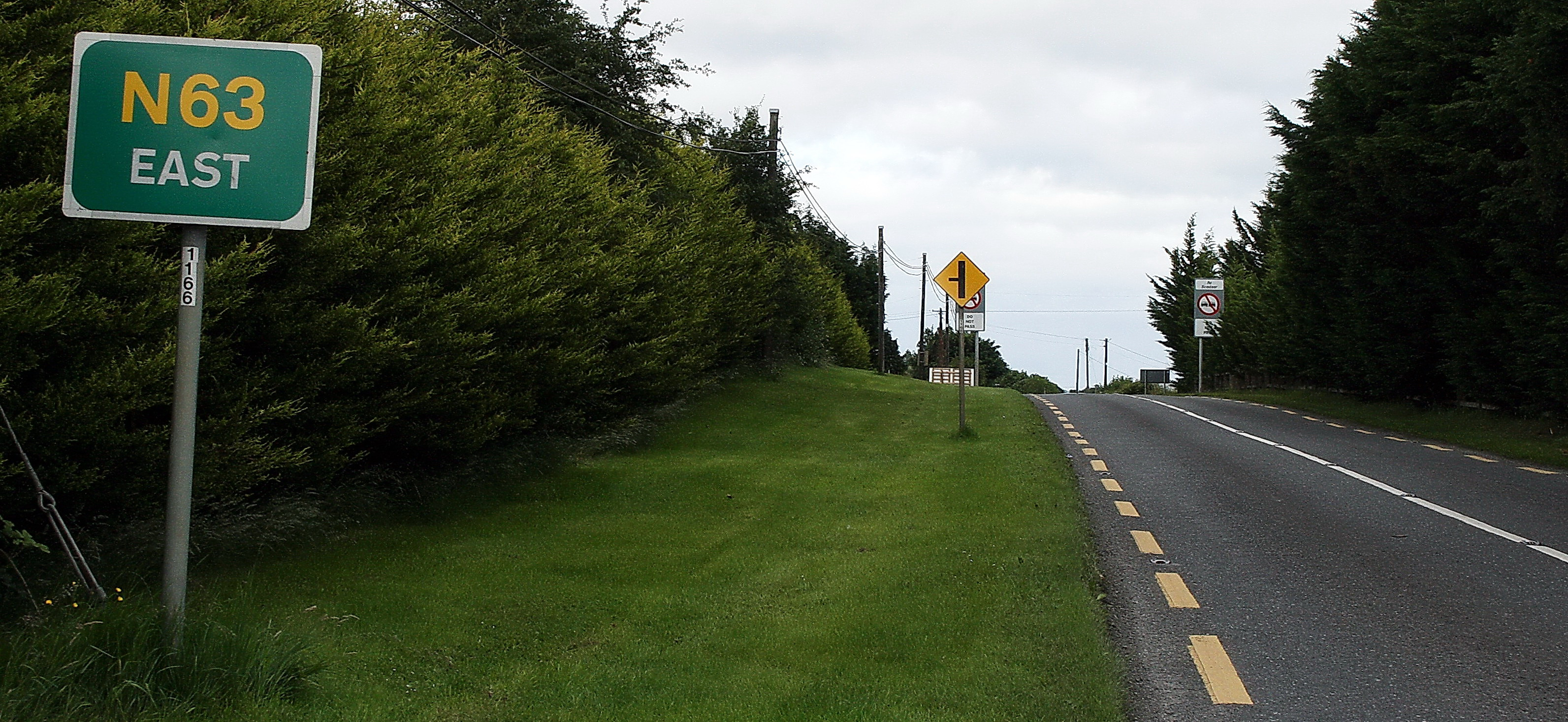
- N63 leaving Lanesborough

Route information
- Length: 96.393 km (59.896 mi)

Location
- Country: Ireland
- Primary destinations: County Galway; Begins at its junction with the M17; (R347); Abbeyknockmoy; Horseleap - (R332); (R328); Moylough - (R364); Mountbellew - (R358); Newbridge - (R363); Ballygar; Crosses the River Suck; County Roscommon; Mount Talbot; (R357); Athleague - (R362); Roscommon - (R366); joins/leaves N61; Emnoo; Coolshaghtena; Ballyclare; Lanesborough - crosses the River Shannon; (R371); (R392); County Longford; (R397); Killashee; Crosses the Royal Canal; Cloondara; Longford - terminates at the N5

Highway system
- Roads in Ireland; Motorways; Primary; Secondary; Regional

The N63 road is a national secondary road in Ireland. It links the M17, 10 km (6.2 mi) northeast of Galway, to the N5 national primary road in Longford.

En route it passes through Mountbellew, Roscommon Town, crosses the River Shannon at Lanesborough.

The road is 96.393 km (59.896 mi) long.

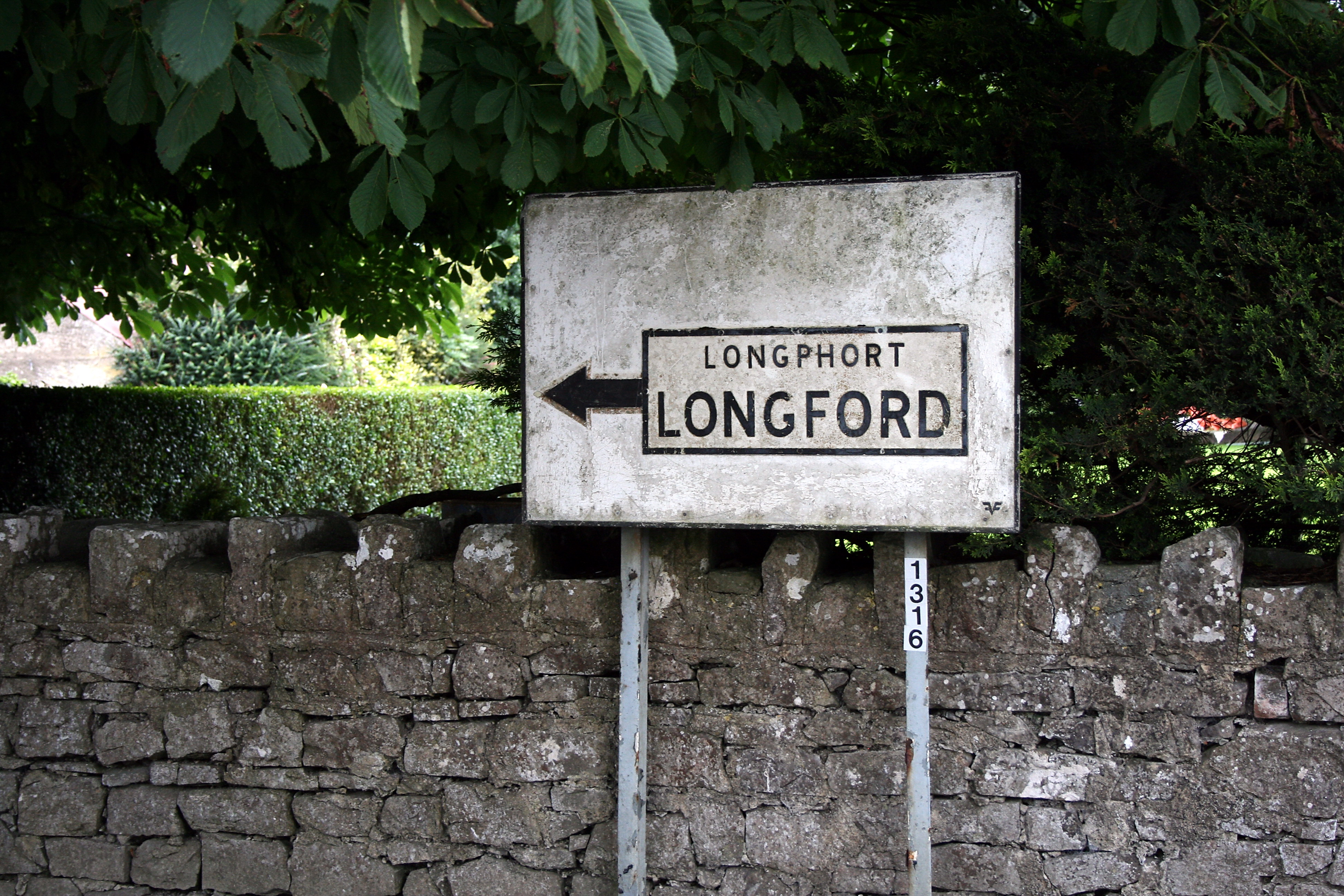
N63 at Killashee
