= R364 road (Ireland) =

Road in Ireland

R364 road
- Bóthar R364
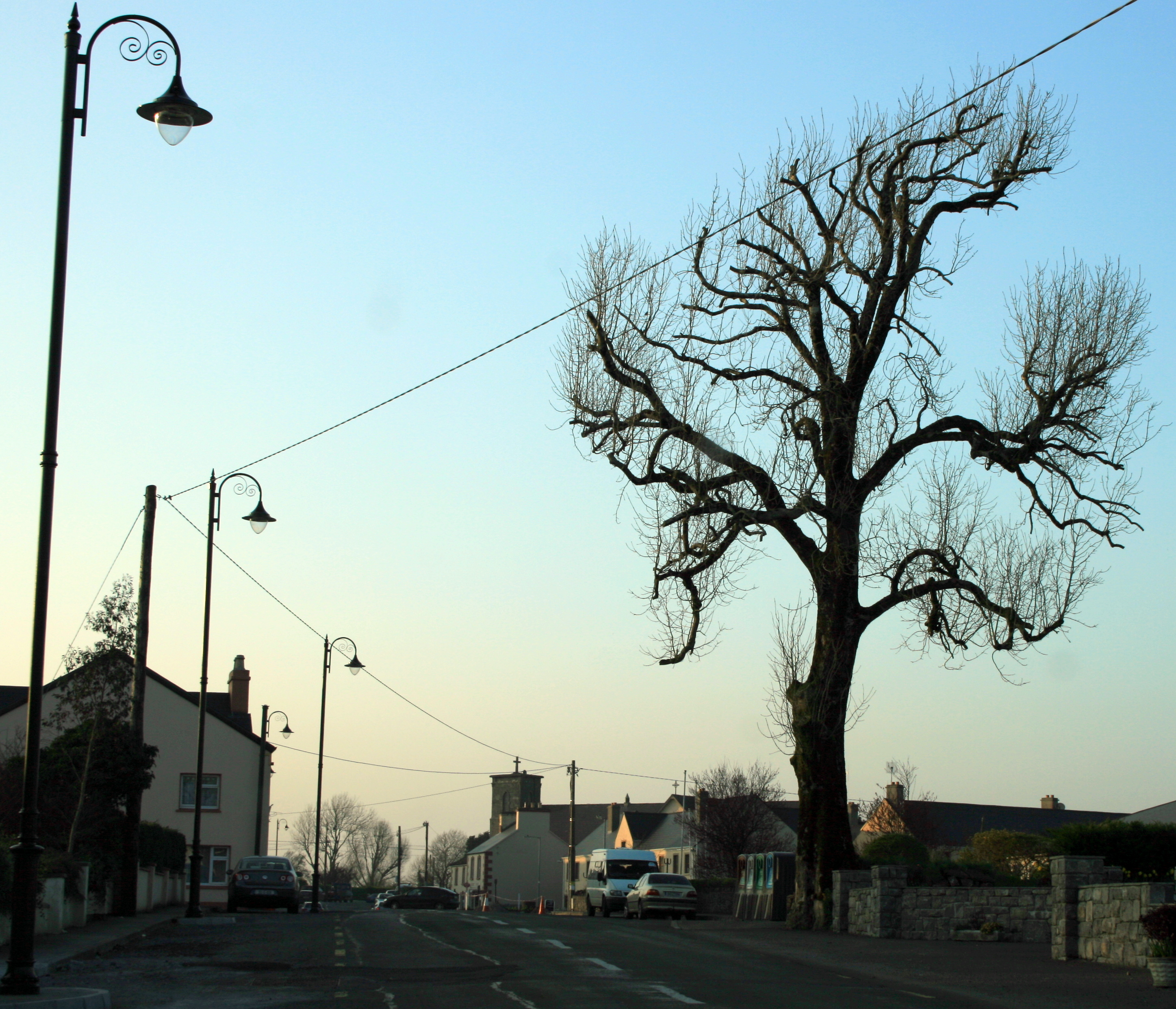
- The R364 passes through Kilkerrin

Route information
- Length: 27 km (17 mi)

Location
- Country: Ireland
- Primary destinations: (Moylough to Knockogonnell): County Galway; Moylough (N63); Annaghmore West; Kilkerrin; Glenamaddy R362; Clooncon West; Cloonminda; Classaghroe; Ballyglass South; Knockogonnell (R360)

Highway system
- Roads in Ireland; Motorways; Primary; Secondary; Regional

The R364 road is a regional road in County Galway, Ireland connecting Moylough on the N63 to near Ballymoe on the N60.

The official definition of the R364 from the Roads Act 1993 (Classification of Regional Roads) Order 2006 states:

R364: Moylough - Ballymoe, County Galway

Between its junction with N63 at Moylough and its junction with R360 at Knockogonnell via Annaghmore West, Kilkerrin, Glenamaddy, Classaghroe and Ballyglass South all in the county of Galway.

== See also ==
- Roads in Ireland
- National primary road
- National secondary road
