= Kilkerrin =

Village in County Galway, Ireland

Coordinates: 53°33′9″N 8°34′4″W

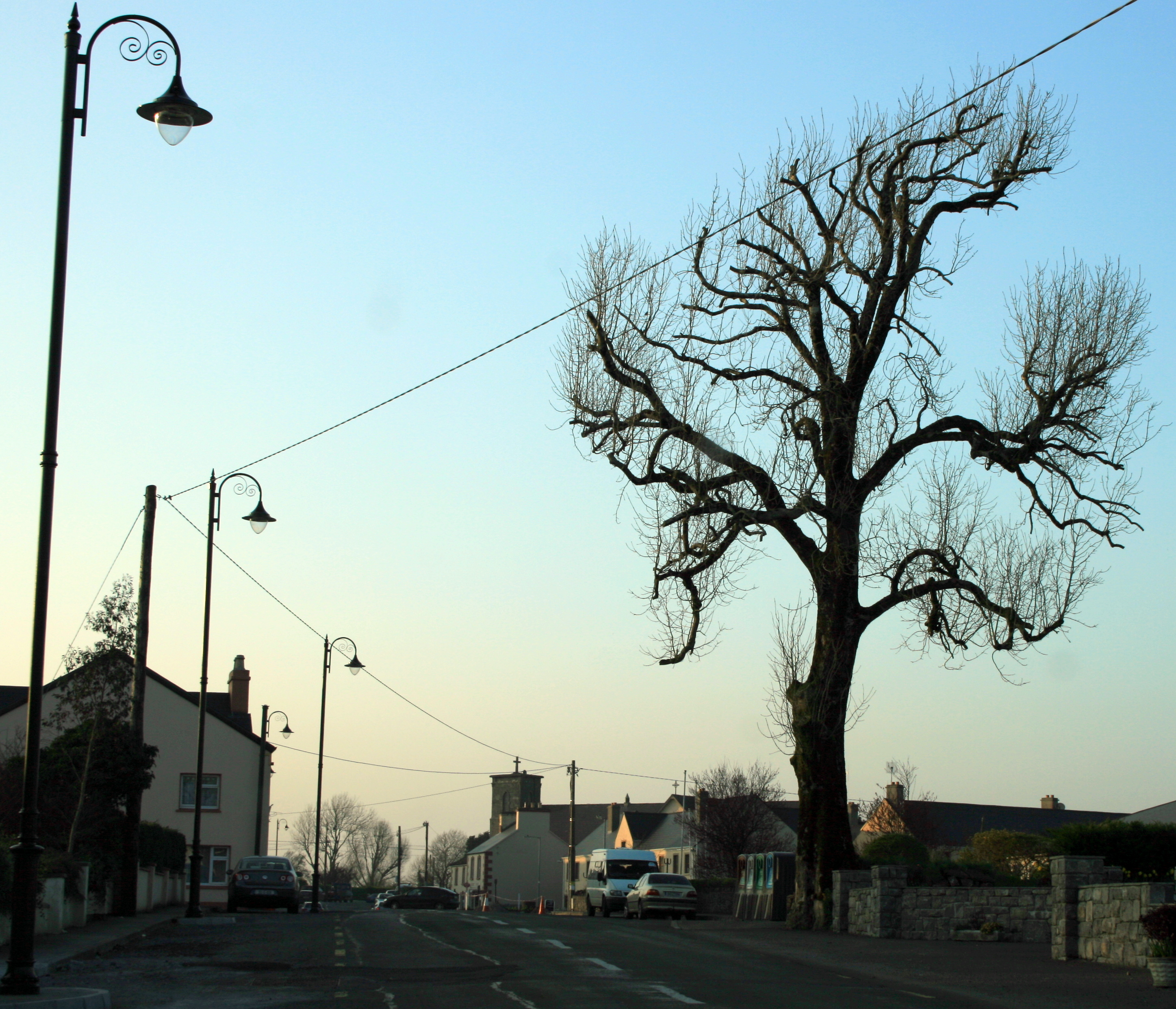
Kilkerrin lies on the R364 regional road

Kilkerrin (Irish: Cill Choirín) is a village in County Galway, Ireland. It is situated on the R364 regional road 6 km (4 mi) south of the town of Glenamaddy. The village is in a townland and civil parish of the same name. Features in the area include Kiltullagh Lake and the Lough Lurgeen raised bog.

The local Gaelic Athletic Association club is Kilkerrin-Clonberne. The local soccer club is Kilkerrin United FC, who play in Division 1 of the Roscommon and District league.

== People ==
- Martin Breheny is from Kilkerrin.

== See also ==
- List of towns and villages in Ireland
