= Headford =

Town in County Galway, Ireland

Headford Irish: Áth Cinn
- Town
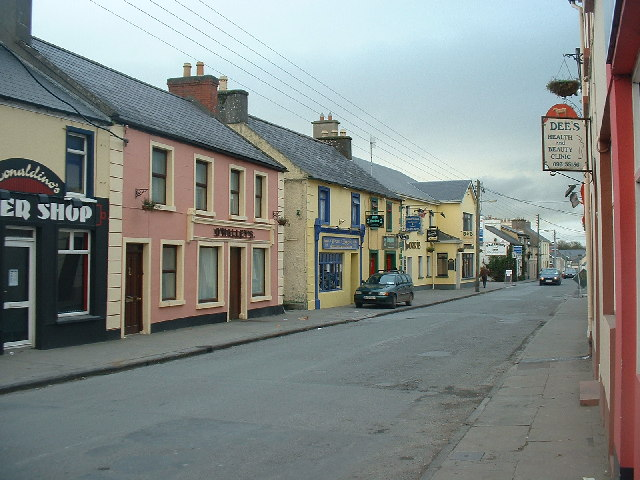
- Main Street
- Motto: Áth Cinn le Chéile
- Location in Ireland
- Coordinates: 53°28′09″N 9°06′25″W
- Country: Ireland
- Province: Connacht
- County: County Galway

Government
  - Dáil Éireann: Galway East

Population (2022)
  - Total: 1,235
- Time zone: UTC+0 (WET)
  - Summer (DST): UTC-1 (IST (WEST))
- Irish Grid Reference: M269468

Headford (Irish: Áth Cinn) is a small town in County Galway, located 26 km north of Galway city in the west of Ireland. It is an angling centre for the eastern shore of Lough Corrib, and Greenfields, approximately 6.5 km west of the town, is its boating harbour. The town is situated next to the Black River (known also for its trout angling) which is the county boundary with Mayo. Located on the N84 national secondary road from Galway to Castlebar and the R333, and R334 regional roads, the town is a commuter town to Galway City. The town is in a townland of the same name, the Killursa civil parish and the Clare barony.

The town is the centre of an area which contains a number of prehistoric burial cairns, Iron Age stone enclosures, early Norman and later castles, and several monastic sites. These include Ross Errilly Friary, located northwest of Headford, which is one of the best preserved monastic ruins of its period in Ireland.

According to 2022 census, there were 1,235 people living in Headford.

== History ==
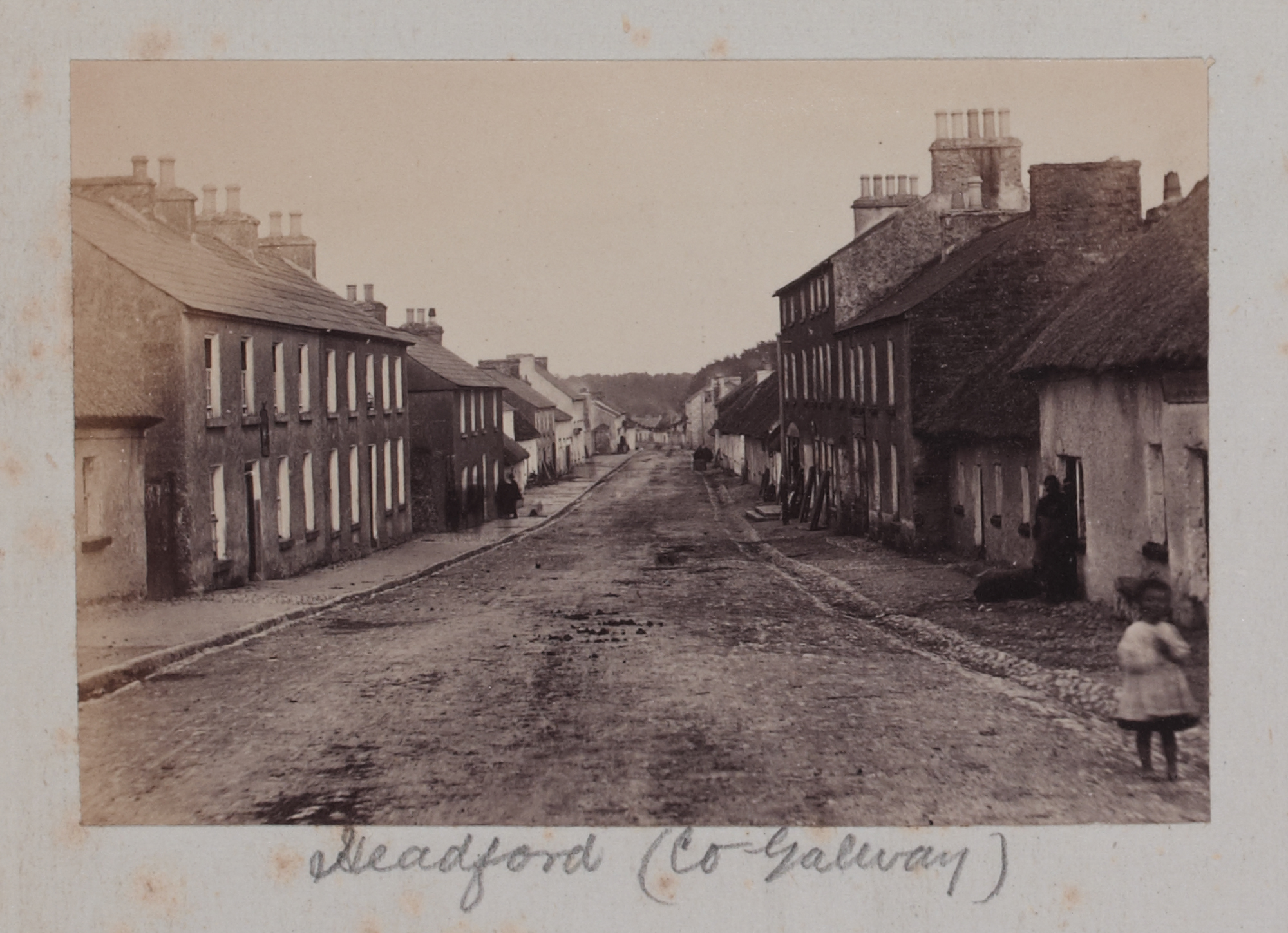
Headford in the late 19th century

In his 1837 Topographical Dictionary of Ireland, Samuel Lewis recorded a population of 1,441. He described the town in some detail:

This is a neat and clean town, having been much improved by its proprietor, R. J. Mansergh St. George, Esq.; it has a considerable trade, and commands fine views of Lough Corrib, and the mountains of Joyces' country and Mayo. It comprises 217 houses, is a chief constabulary police station, and has petty sessions on Mondays; here is also a dispensary. Bobbin lace, coarse linen, and flannel are made. The market is on Tuesday, and fairs are held on May 11th and Oct. 14th. Headford Castle is the residence of R. J. M. St. George, Esq.; it is a handsome modern building, erected on the ruins of the ancient castle; the extensive demesne, which is laid out with great taste, is entered from the town by a good gateway. Here is also Clydagh House, the seat of G. Staunton Lynch, Esq.

The St. George's family ownership of the town is explored in "Headford, County Galway, 1775-1901" by Gerardine Candon (ISBN 1-85182-764-1).

The tradition of lacemaking in Headford has been covered in exhibitions and public artworks, and in the Irish National Inventory of Intangible Cultural Heritage. Lace, in a style known as Torchon, is reproduced by modern lacemakers. A public art project, the Lace Matrix, created a sculpture of iron and lace to represent the local lace tradition. A renewal of the lace artwork was installed in 2024 by the lace artist Tarmo Thorström, entitled Cyclogenesis.

== Education ==
Headford has a small library with two book clubs - one for children from 8 to 13 years and one for adults.

Headford has one secondary school, Presentation College Headford, which had approximately 780 pupils as of late 2019.

The town itself has two primary schools: Headford Girls National School and St Brendan's Boys National School (which is attached to the girls' school and takes boys from third to sixth class).

There are three primary schools in the surrounding areas, Scoil Naomh Fursa in Claran, Cloughanover National School and Clydagh National School.

== Sports ==
Headford is home to a number of sporting clubs and groups, including Corrib Rugby Football Club and Moyne Villa Football Club.

Gaelic Athletic Association (GAA) clubs in the area include Headford GAA club and St Fursey's Ladies GAA.

There is also a badminton club, karate club and the Black River Game and Conservative Club.

== Politics ==
The town is part of the Midlands–North-West constituency for European Parliament elections. It is part of the Galway East constituency for elections to Dáil Éireann, and is part of the Tuam electoral area for Galway County Council elections.

The local polling stations are in the area's primary schools.

== Religion ==
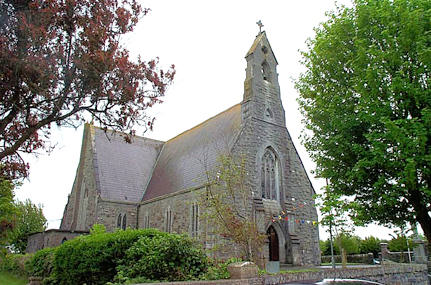
Headford Catholic church

The Headford Parish has two churches, both of which are Catholic and were built by Fr. Peter Conway and dedicated to St. Mary. The church at Claran was built in 1859 and for many years was the home of the parish priest. The church in Headford was built in 1865 on lands donated by the landlord St. George. Father Ray Flaherty is parish priest of the Headford parish with Fr. Martin Newell (retired) administrating in Claran.

Killursa, a ruined medieval church dedicated to Saint Fursey, lies 2.6 kilometres (1.6 mi) to the west of Headford, in the Ower townland.

The ruins of Ross Errilly Friary, a 14th or 15th century monastery, lie approximately 2 kilometres (1.2 mi) northwest of the town, and appeared very briefly in John Ford's The Quiet Man (1952).

== Twin towns ==
Headford is twinned with:

- Le Faouët, Brittany, France.
- Morgan Hill, Santa Clara County, California, United States.

== See also ==
- List of towns and villages in Ireland
- Roman Catholic Archdiocese of Tuam
