= R347 road (Ireland) =

Road in Ireland

Coordinates: 53.338897°N 8.773041°W

R347 road
- Bóthar R347
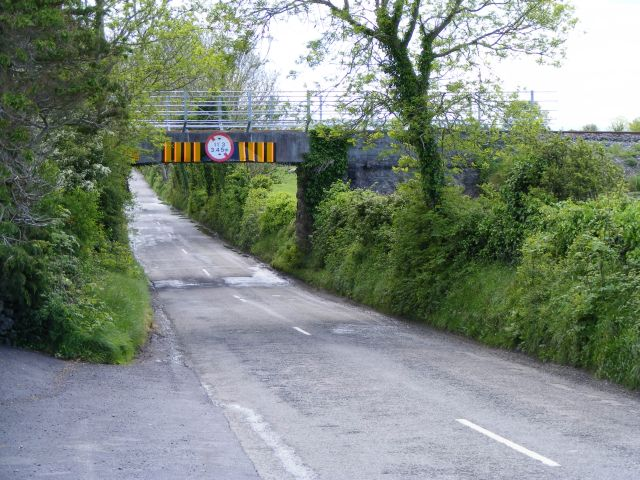
- Railway bridge over R347, Ballyboy

Route information
- Length: 54.4 km (33.8 mi)

Major junctions
- From: R332 Tuam
- Crosses Grange River; N63 Parkgarve; R339 Crossaun; R348 Athenry
- To: R513 Ballyfauskeen Cross

Location
- Country: Ireland

Highway system
- Roads in Ireland; Motorways; Primary; Secondary; Regional

The R347 road is a regional road in Ireland, located in County Galway.
