= R371 road (Ireland) =

Road in Ireland

R371 road
- Bóthar R371
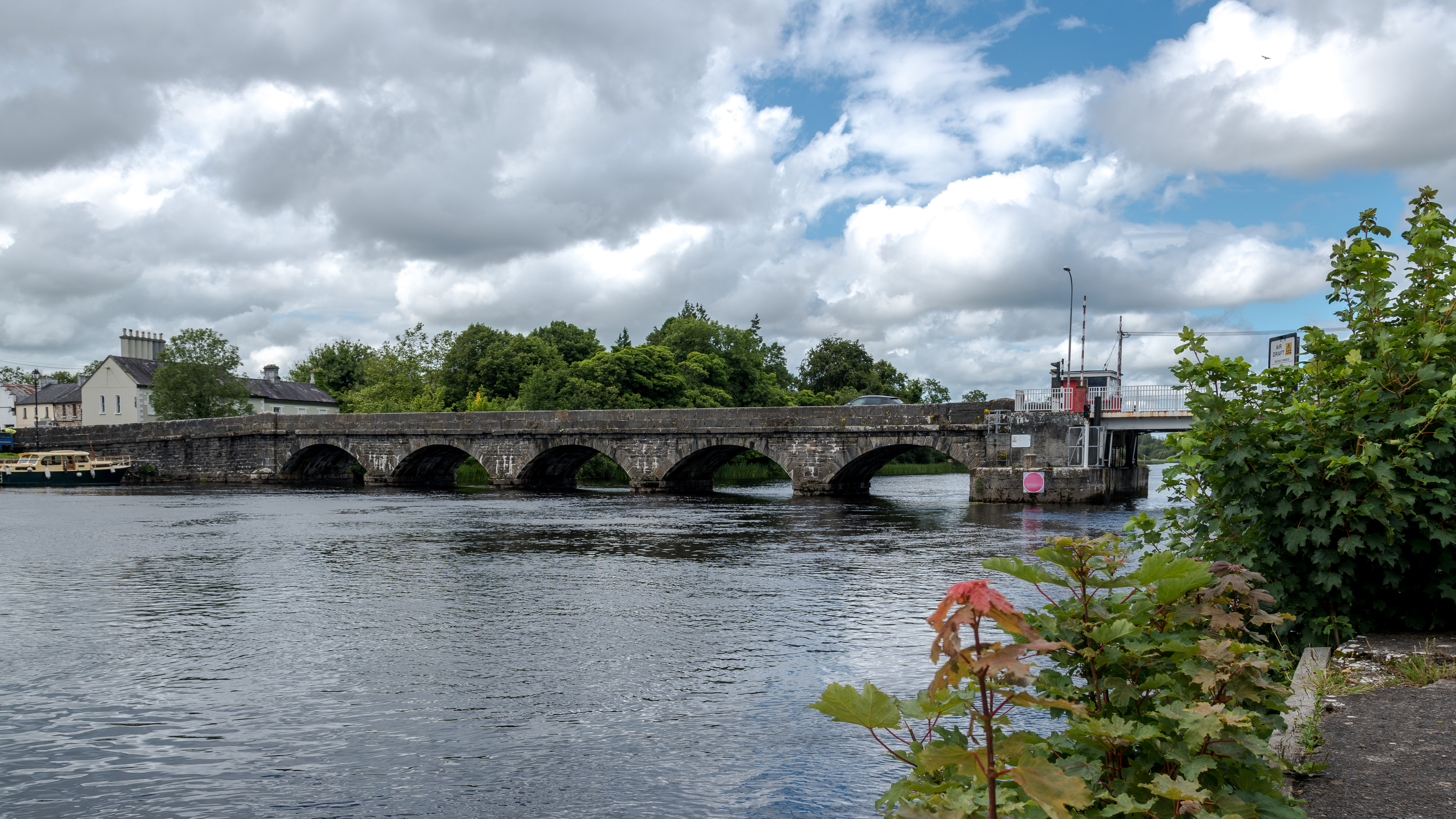
- Roosky Bridge over the River Shannon, part of the R371

Route information
- Length: 23 km (14 mi)

Location
- Country: Ireland
- Primary destinations: County Leitrim; Tomisky; Dromod; County Roscommon; Roosky; Starts on a bridge joining the N4; Crosses the River Shannon; Heads west for 6km to Kilglass Lough; then south for 6 km; Scramoge – crosses the (N5); Strokestown; Ballyleague – terminates at the N63

Highway system
- Roads in Ireland; Motorways; Primary; Secondary; Regional

The R371 road is a regional road in Ireland linking Roosky on the N4 with the N63 in Lanesborough, on the Ballyleague (western) side of the town. The route is mostly in County Roscommon, except for the initial section leaving the N4 which is in Counties Longford and Leitrim. En route it passes through Scramogue, where it crosses the N5. The road is 23 km (14 mi) long.

== See also ==
- Roads in Ireland
- National primary road
- National secondary road
