= Finvarra =

Irish folkloric figure

Finvarra, also called Finvara, Finn Bheara, Finbeara or Fionnbharr, is the king of the Daoine Sidhe of western Ireland in Irish folklore. In some legends, he is also the ruler of the dead. Finvarra is a benevolent figure, associated with horses, who ensures good harvests and rewards mortals with riches.

== Location ==
According to legend, Finvarra lives beneath Cnoc Meadha or Knockma, a hill near Tuam in County Galway; this hill was traditionally associated with the fairies. There is a cairn on the hill, marked as "Finvarra's castle" on at least one map.

Dáithí Ó hÓgáin suggests that Finvarra's name comes from findbharr, “fair top,” originally referring to the top of the hill or a cairn there, and was later repurposed as the name of a deity who lived there.

== Mythology ==
Fionnbharr plays a role in the Fenian Cycle and in bardic poetry, where he is one of the Tuatha Dé Danann. Findbharr of Cnoc Meadha is mentioned in the Agallamh na Seanoach (12th century). In Altram Tighe Dá Mheadar (The Fosterage of the House of the Two Drinking Vessels), Finnbarr Meadha is one of the Dé Dananns, who becomes ruler of the hill of Meadha after they are driven underground by the Milesians. He has a violent argument with his brother Oengus after insulting one of Oengus's foster-daughters. He has seventeen sons according to the Acallam na Senórach, and in one poem it is said that Manannán gave him a wonderful harp named Brégadh Banntrachta.

In the 15th-century Feis Tighe Chondin (The Feast of the House of Conán), Fionnbharr of Magh Feabhail is king of the "Tuatha Dedanans" and leads an army against Fionn mac Cumhaill and the Fenians only to fall in battle at the hands of Goll.

== Folk belief ==
Legends of Finvarra and his connection with Knockma survived into later folklore, where he was considered the king of the fairies, particularly of Connacht. Local beliefs held that the doings of the fairies influenced the local crops. Whenever Finvarra lived in the hill it was a good year for the country, and when he was absent, it would be a bad year. His battles and hurling matches affected the health of the crops; when his people defeated the fairies of other provinces, the crops of Connacht bloomed. There was a rivalry between the Munster fairy king and Finvarra. Famine was attributed to disturbances in the fairy world, and one folk informant claimed to have seen the "good people" fighting in the sky over Knock Ma. According to many tales, Finvarra would invite humans into his underground palace for feasts.

Finvarra has a beautiful queen named Onagh or Una, or other versions, Nuala. However, he often steals away human women as lovers. In the story of "Ethna the Bride," Finvarra kidnaps Ethna, the loveliest woman in Ireland. Her husband, Denis Kirwan is able to win her back by digging into the fairy hill of Knockma and salting the earth. Ethna returns but falls into a deep sleep since Finvarra has kept her soul. Her husband revives her by removing a girdle and fairy pin that she had been dressed in by the fairies. With Finvarra's role as a ruler of the dead, this story bears a resemblance to the ballad of Sir Orfeo. It also has similarities to the story of Midir and Étaín.

In another story, a man who foolishly stays out late on Halloween is swept along with a group of fairies on their way to a fair. He meets their king Finvarra and his wife, and realizes that the people around him are spirits of the dead. They force him to dance until he passes out, and he wakes up the next morning in a stone circle, covered in bruises.

Finnbheara can also be benevolent in folk legends, such as one where he heals a woman. He is strongly associated with horses. In one story, he goes to a blacksmith to have his three-legged horse shod, and the next day a pound note flies to the blacksmith on the wind. In another tradition, Finvar watched over the Kirwan family who lived in Castle Hackett near Knockma. Finvar and his people would carouse and drink in the Castle cellars, but left the cellars always well-stocked and the wine improved. They would also exercise the race-horses late at night, granting them speed and good fortune in the races. In another story, a member of the Hacket family was unable to find a good jockey for a race, so Finnbheara himself appeared, rode the horse, and disappeared after winning the race.
