= Anne McLoughlin =

- Born: 1960 (age 65–66)

Anne McLoughlin, Irish aid worker and hostage, born c. 1960.

== Background ==
A native of Coolebeg, Cloontuskert, County Galway, McLoughlin was the centre of an international event when she was taken hostage in Ethiopia in 1984. She had been working with Concern (now Concern Worldwide) at Korem since November 1983, as an administrator of aid to Somali refugees of local wars. In a message recorded prior to her kidnapping, she stated that:

"The people are absolutely starving. I find it hard to describe the poverty in Korem and Ethiopia. There are people lying in their own diarrhoea with all sorts of diseases like malaria, dysentery, typhoid, relapsing fever and the babies suffer from hypothermia because of the extreme night and day temperatures. Complete families are suffering from the drought here."

== TPLF attack and capture ==
On Wednesday 21 April 1984 the Tigrayan People's Liberation Front attacked Korem. Two of the heavily armed guerrillas seized McLoughlin and the other volunteers. They were forced to walk over the mountains or ride mules till they reached the militants' camp. They were held in captivity in extremely primitive conditions, surviving on very sparse meals.

However, the Tigrayan had not intended to harm the volunteers, their purpose being to bring world attention to the famine.

== Release and later life ==
On 1 May they began the long journey down from the mountains. They again crossed several rivers and were anxious at the constant fear of being attacked and shot by other militant elements. They arrived in Khartoum where they were greeted by Concern's field director. They had been in captivity for forty-nine days.

McLoughlin later worked as a teacher in Tanzania, where she met James O'Loughlin of Ballinrobe, and later married. She subsequently moved to Ennis, County Clare.
