= Moylough =

Moylough Maigh Locha (Irish)
- Village
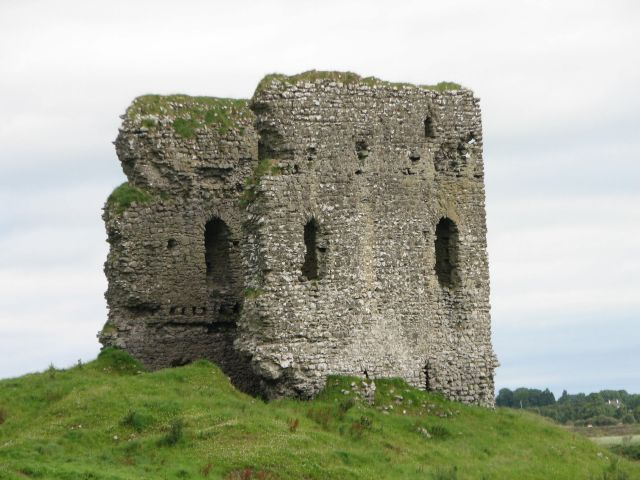
- Moylough Castle is a 13th century tower or hall house

- Location within Ireland
- Coordinates: 53.488°N 8.568°W
- Country: Ireland
- Province: Connacht
- County: County Galway

Population (2016)
  - Total: 518

Moylough (/mɔɪˈlɒx/ moy-LOKH; Irish: Maigh Locha, meaning 'plain of the lake') is a rural village located in County Galway, Ireland. As of the 2016 census, it had a population of 518. The village is in a civil parish of the same name.

Moylough is 5 km (3 mi) northwest of Mountbellew and 50 km (31 mi) from Galway. It is located on the N63 national secondary road, and is also served by the R328 and R364 regional roads.

== History ==
Moylough was part of the ancient kingdom of the Soghain of Connacht.

Other evidence of ancient settlement in the area includes Moylough Castle, a 13th-century tower house historically associated with the Norman de Cotterell and de Cogeshale families.

Together with nearby Mountbellew, Moylough has been twinned with Elliant in Brittany since 1998.

== Amenities ==
Amenities within Moylough include a national (primary) school, Garda station, post office and community centre. Many of the village's amenities lie within the townland of Moylough More, including the local Catholic church (built c. 1830). As of the 2011 census, Moylough More townland had a population of over 440 people.

== Notable people ==
Moylough is the birthplace of Thomas Higgins who became the shortest serving MP in Westminster when, representing the Irish Parliamentary Party, he was posthumously declared elected a Member of Parliament of the House of Commons of the United Kingdom of Great Britain and Ireland on 26 January 1906.

Thomas Carr, Archbishop of Melbourne 1886–1917, was born near Moylough in 1839.

There is a statue of the Galway Gaelic footballer Enda Colleran in the town.

Former Irish rugby manager Eddie O'Sullivan is from Moylough.

== See also ==
- List of towns and villages in Ireland
