= Kilteevan =

Village in County Roscommon, Ireland

Kilteevan (Irish: Cill Taobháin, meaning 'Teevan's Church') is a village and parish in County Roscommon, Ireland. It is 6 km to the east of Roscommon town, and 9 km to the north of Knockcroghery village. Kilteevan is in a townland and civil parish of the same name.

The village contains a Catholic church, former mass rock, community centre, primary school, public house and Gaelic Athletic Association park. The local GAA football club is St. Joseph's GAA. Club and the grounds are located at Aghmagree. The polling station for the area during elections and referendums is located in Kilteevan National School.

== Notable connections ==
The Hollywood actor Tom Cruise can trace his roots back to Kilteevan through his real surname, Maypother.

The parents of the former director of the CIA, John Brennan, emigrated from Kilteevan to New Jersey in 1948. He returned to Kilteevan with his brother and father in August 2013 as part of the Gathering celebrations.
