= Cnoc Meadha =

Hill in County Galway, Ireland

Cnoc Meadha known as Medb's hill (also Cnoc Meádha Siuil referring to its location on the plain of Maigh Seóla, and variously spelled Knockmagha, Knockma, or Knock Ma) is a hill west of Tuam, in the parish of Caherlistrane County Galway, in Ireland.

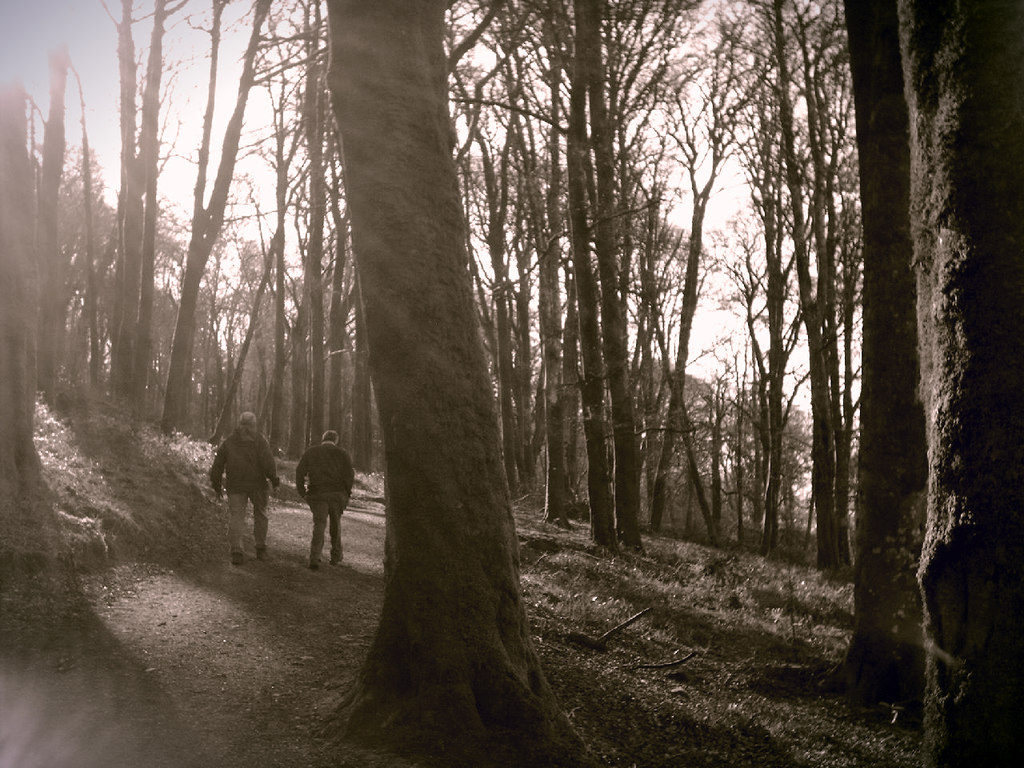
Knockmaa, Co. Galway

It is said in legend to be the residence of Finnbheara, the king of the Connacht fairies. Of four large cairns on the hill, one was thought to be the burial-place of Finnbheara and the other of Queen Medb, whose name may be transformed in the name Cnoc Meadha. Knockma Hill is topped with prehistoric cairns.

G. H. Kinahan wrote of the place:

The soft breezes that pass one in an evening in West Galway are called fairy paths. They are said to be due to the flight of a band of the good people on their way to Cnockmaa (Hill of the Plain), near Castle Hackett, on the east of Lough Corrib, which is their great resort in Connaught. […] A soft hot blast indicates the presence of a good fairy; while a sudden shiver shows that a bad one is near.

In Evans-Wentz's classic The Fairy-Faith in Celtic Countries, his informant Mr John Glynn, the town clerk of Tuam, mentions that:

The whole of Knock Ma (Cnoc Meadha) which probably means Hill of the Plain, is said to be the palace of Finvara, king of the Connaught fairies. There are a good many legends about Finvara, but very few about Queen Maeve in this region.

During 1846-7 the potato crop in Ireland was a failure, and very much suffering resulted. At the times, the country people in these parts attributed the famine to disturbed conditions in the fairy world. Old Thady Steed once told me about the conditions then prevailing, "Sure, we couldn't be any other way; and I saw the good people and hundreds besides me saw them fighting in the sky over Knock Ma and on towards Galway." And I heard others say they saw the fighting also.
