= Kilmaine =

Village in County Mayo, Ireland

Kilmaine Irish: Cill Mheáin
- Village
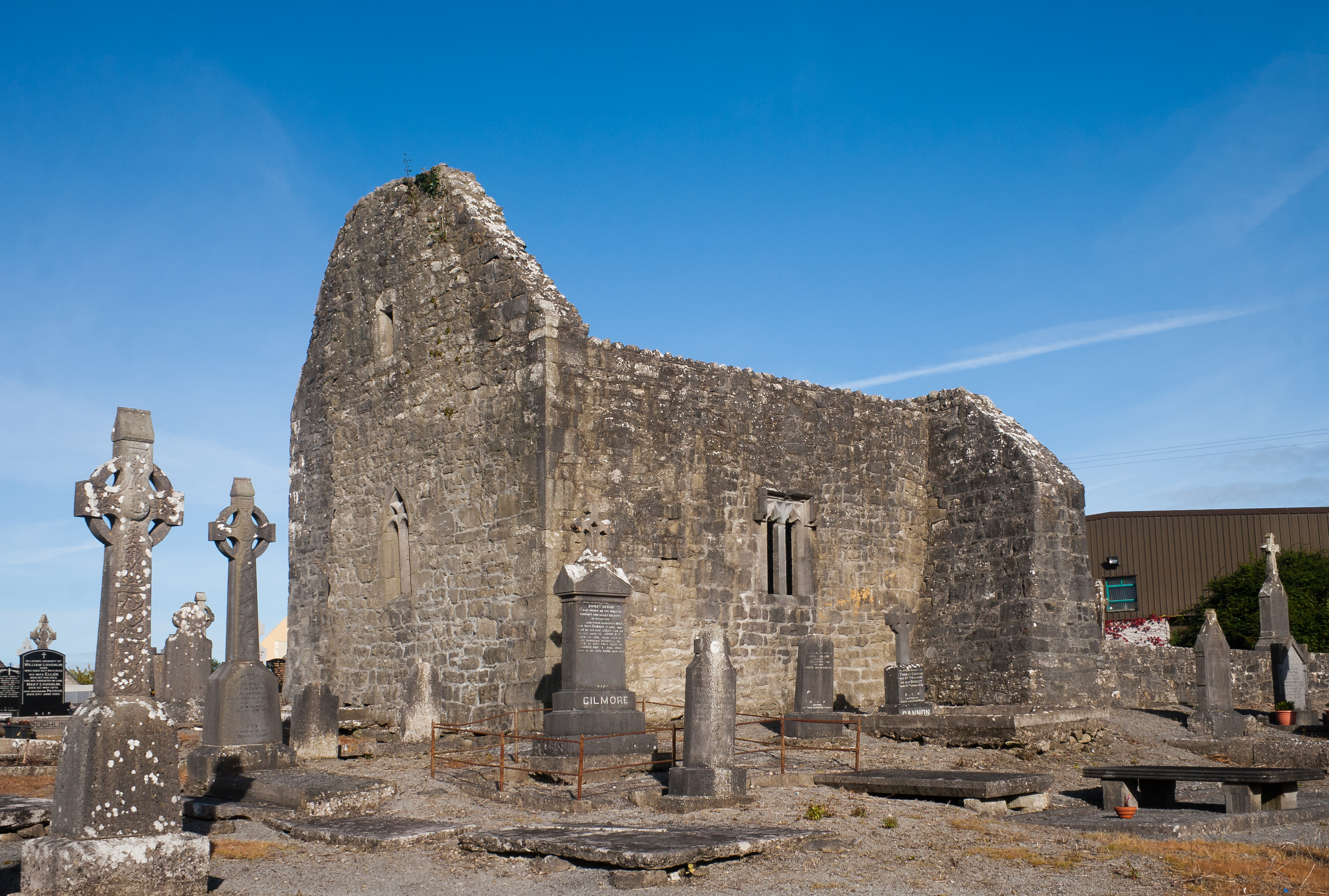

- Location in Ireland
- Coordinates: 53°35′00″N 9°07′00″W
- Country: Ireland
- Province: Connacht
- County: County Mayo
- Elevation: 59 m (194 ft)

Population (2016)
  - Total: 147
- Irish Grid Reference: M260598

Kilmaine or Kilmain (Irish: Cill Mheáin) is a village in County Mayo, Ireland.

== Village ==
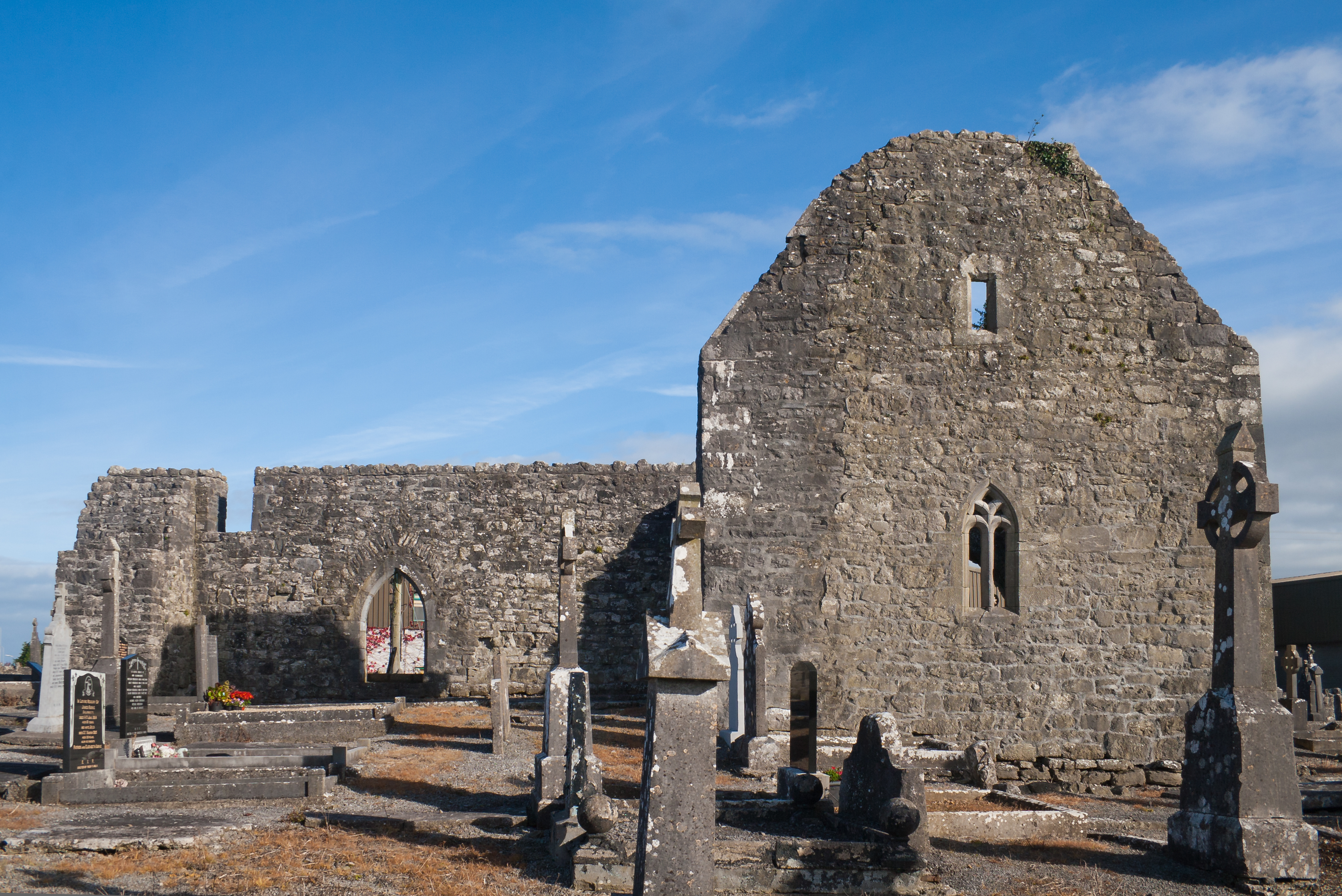
Old church of Kilmaine with a 16th-century tracery window on the site of an early Christian monastery which, according to tradition, has been founded by St. Patrick. It became a prebendary church of Tuam.

"Kilmaine", derived from the Irish language 'Cill Mheán', means The Middle Church – 'Cill' is the word used in the Irish language for a church, and 'meán' is the Irish word for middle. The village is located on the N84 road between Shrule and Ballinrobe. The hinterland is entirely rural, made up of farms and scattered houses. The nearest town is Ballinrobe, and the closest city is Galway, roughly 40 kilometers (24 miles) away.

The village of Kilmaine had a population of 147 at the 2016 census. The village has a shop, two pubs, a church, school, a Garda (police) station. It also has a Gaelic Athletic Association pitch.

== Transport ==
The village lies on the N84 road that links Galway to Castlebar (Irish: Caisleán an Bharraigh) . A bus service that runs four days a week between Galway and Ballina passes through Kilmaine and also travels through Castlebar.

== Sport ==
Kilmaine GAA Crest

The local Gaelic Athletic Association club, Kilmaine GAA, was founded on 9 March 1937. The first competitive game ever played by a Kilmaine team was against Castlegar (Claremorris), in Curran's field. A local boxing club sometimes runs in the community centre.

== Kilmaine barony ==
Civil parishes:

- Ballinchalla
- Ballinrobe
- Cong
- Kilcommon
- Kilmainebeg
- Kilmainemore
- Kilmolara
- Mayo
- Moorgagagh
- Robeen
- Shrule

Towns and villages:

- Ballinrobe
- Cong
- Hollymount
- Kilmaine
- Roundfort
- Shrule
- The Neale

== See also ==
- List of towns and villages in Ireland
- Charles Edward Jennings de Kilmaine
