= Lanesborough–Ballyleague =

Town in Longford and Roscommon, Ireland

Lanesborough-Ballyleague Irish: Béal Átha Liag
- Town
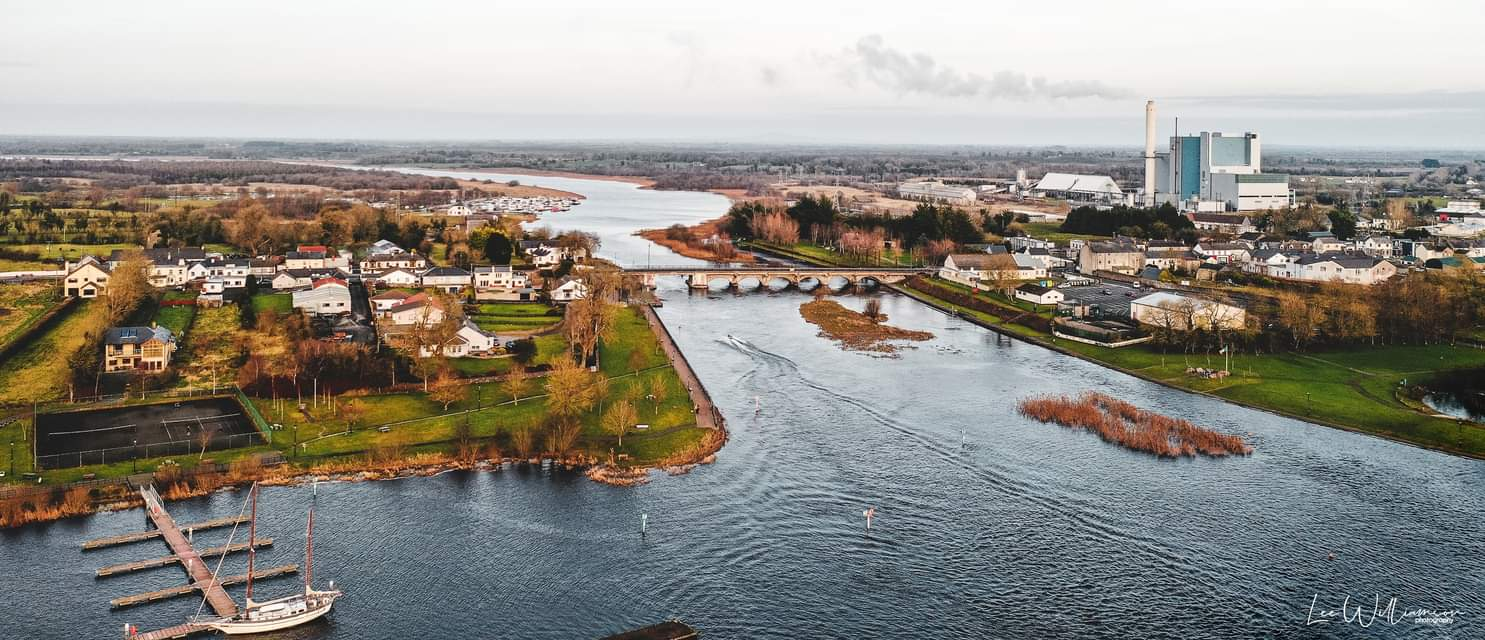
- Lough Ree Power Station, Lanesborough

- Location in Ireland
- Coordinates: 53.674°N 7.992°W
- Country: Ireland
- Province: Leinster
- County: Longford & Roscommon
- Elevation: 43 m (141 ft)

Population (2022)
  - Total: 1,733
- Time zone: UTC±0 (WET)
  - Summer (DST): UTC+1 (IST)
- Eircode routing key: N39
- Telephone area code: +353(0)43
- Irish Grid Reference: N004694

Lanesborough–Ballyleague (Irish: Béal Átha Liag), more commonly known simply as Lanesborough, is a town in the midlands of Ireland. Lanesborough is on the County Longford (east) side and Ballyleague on the County Roscommon (west) side of the River Shannon, at the northern tip of Lough Ree.

Lanesborough–Ballyleague is on the N63 road at its junction with the R371 (at Ballyleague) and R392 (at Lanesborough). Longford town is 16 km north-east along the N63, Roscommon town is 15 km south-west along the N63, Ballymahon is 20 km south-east along the R392 and Strokestown is 15 km north-west along the R371.

== Geography ==
The river Shannon divides the two towns. As a result, the two towns are in two separate provinces (Leinster on the east and Connacht on the west); two separate counties (Longford on the east and Roscommon on the west); two separate Roman Catholic Dioceses (Ardagh and Clonmacnoise on the east and Elphin on the west); and two separate Roman Catholic parishes (Rathcline on the east and, Kilgefin which consists of Ballyleague, Ballagh and Curraghroe on the west).

The original name of the town, Athliag, means Ford of Stones – derived from the flagstones placed across the river to assist the crossing.

The first real bridge was built around 1000AD by Malachy, High King of Meath, and the King of Connacht – built to link in the middle in their joint effort to defend against the Vikings. The first more permanent bridge was built in 1140 by Turlough O'Connor, High King of Ireland.

A further bridge was built in 1667 and survived till 1690 when it was destroyed by Colonel O'Reilly to stop the Williamite army under General Kirk.

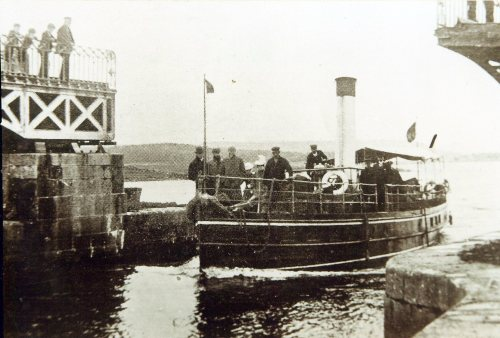
Steamer belonging to Bernard Forbes, 8th Earl of Granard, passing through Lanesborough Bridge in 1900.

In 1701 a ferry carrying 46 people to the fair capsized and 35 drowned. Parliament was petitioned for a new bridge, and a stone bridge was erected in 1706, 300' long, 15' wide with 9 arches. It was demolished to provide a new bridge in 1844 which contained a swivel arch to allow large boats to pass through. This was removed in the 1960s and replaced by a concrete span in 1971.

== Amenities ==
The Lanesborough–Ballyleague area is known for its sports fishing, and angling tourists coming to fish for bream, tench, rudd and pike on the Shannon. The Lough Ree Angling hub was set up in 2015 and has hosted the World Predator Boat Fishing championships and several other international angling events since then. The largest recorded pike ever caught in Ireland was caught in Lanesborough and weighed in at 62.5 lbs. The annual Regatta and the horse fair are important to the local economy. Lanesborough–Ballyleague is also a stop-over point for pleasure boats on the River Shannon navigation system. Lough Ree is just to the south and stretches almost 30 km to Athlone: while upstream the Shannon meanders 40 km to Carrick on Shannon and beyond to the Shannon-Erne Waterway.

== Sport ==
The two towns have separate Gaelic Athletic Association football teams: Rathcline and St Faithleachs.

Lanesborough also has an Annual Triathlon which consists of a 750 m swim, 22 km cycling and 5 km run. It is organised by Lanesboro Triathlon Club.

== Sailing ==
It is recorded that a Town Regatta took place in 1927. This regatta provided races for yachts and dinghies including Dublin Bay Water Wags. Trophies won in this regatta still exist.

The annual regatta was reinstated in the 2000s and racing takes place for the traditional Shannon-One-Design dinghies over a weekend every September. This regatta does not include the rowing races which were traditionally a feature of regattas at the towns (such as Athlone or Carrick-on-Shannon) on the River Shannon.

== Economy ==
The Electricity Supply Board and Bord na Móna are among the largest employers in the area. In 2016, the "Taste of the Lakelands Food Festival" brought a crowd of 6000 visitors to the town with the intent to bring a new focus on food tourism and food production in the area.

== Twin town ==
- Lanesborough, Massachusetts, United States

== Public transport ==
The town is served by three Bus Éireann routes. Route 425 (Longford-Galway) provides a daily (except Sunday) service each way to/from Galway via Roscommon. Route 467 provides two additional journeys each way to/from Longford on Wednesday, and route 65 provides a journey each way to/from Galway and Cavan on Fridays and Sundays.

== See also ==
- List of towns and villages in the Republic of Ireland
- Earl of Lanesborough
