= Castle Hackett =

Ruined tower house in County Galway, Ireland

Castlehacket
- Caisleán an Haicéadaigh
- Part of Ancient Gaelic Kingdom of Maigh Seola
- County Galway, Ireland
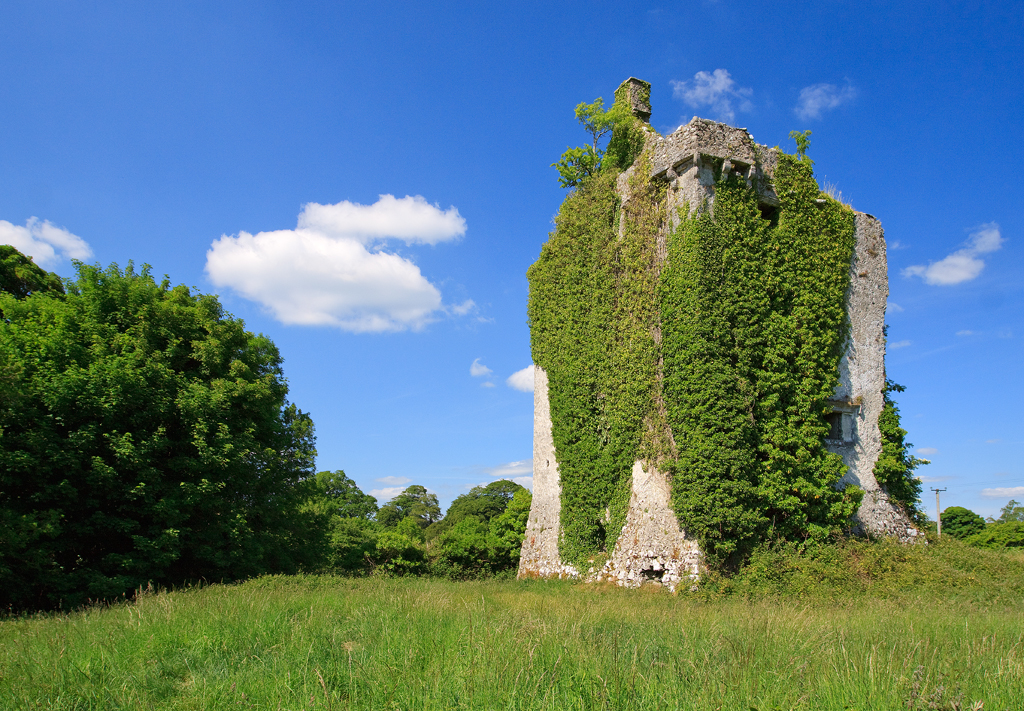
- The ruins of Castle Hacket (tower house) in County Galway

Site information
- Open to the public: No
- Condition: Ruin

Location
- Coordinates: 53.4891°N 8.9695°W

Site history
- Built: 13th century (core structure); 16th century (later additions)
- In use: Until 18th century

Castle Hackett is a ruined 13th-century tower house at the base of Knockma Hill, 10 kilometres (6 mi) south-west of Tuam in the parish of Caherlistrane, County Galway, Ireland. It is located near Belclare in the townland of Castlehacket (Irish: Caisleán an Haicéadaigh).

== History ==
The castle was originally built by the Hacketts, a Norman family. In Castles and Stronghouses of Ireland (1993), Mike Salter suggests that the structure may have originally been a 13th century hall house with the building's two upper storeys added during the 16th century. By the late 16th century, the tower house was in the possession of 'Ullig McReamon [Burke]'.

The Kirwans, one of the tribes of Galway, purchased the Castlehacket estate in the late 17th century. The Castlehacket branch of the Kirwan family had been established in the mid-17th century by Sir John Kirwan. The tower house, which was occupied until at least 1703, was abandoned by the Kirwans during the 18th century and they built a new three-storey house nearby.

The 18th-century house, known as Castlehacket House, was burned in 1923 during the Civil War; it was subsequently rebuilt. In 2016, it was renovated to operate as a bed and breakfast. It is included in the Record of Protected Structures maintained by Galway County Council.

== Folklore ==
In the introduction to his Fairy and Folk Tales of the Irish Peasantry (1888), William Butler Yeats mentions the Hackett family and the castle, writing, "Each county has usually some family, or personage, supposed to have been favoured or plagued [with fairy-seeing abilities], especially by the phantoms, as the Hackets of Castle Hacket, Galway, who had for their ancestor a fairy".

== See also ==
- Tower houses in Britain and Ireland
- Norman Ireland
