= N84 road (Ireland) =

Road in Ireland

N84 road
- Bóthar N84
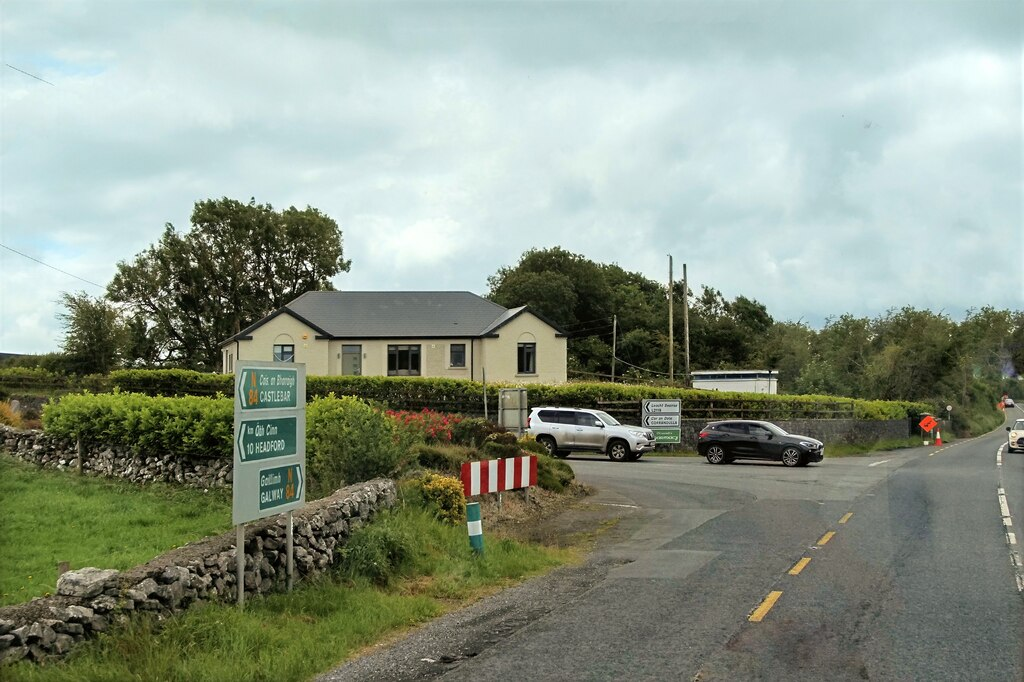
- The N84 near Corrandulla

Route information
- Length: 73.545 km (45.699 mi)

Location
- Country: Ireland
- Primary destinations: County Galway; Galway; Cloonboo; Headford; County Mayo; Shrule; Kilmaine; Ballinrobe; Partry; Castlebar

Highway system
- Roads in Ireland; Motorways; Primary; Secondary; Regional

The N84 road is a national secondary road in Ireland. It is a major route in the West connecting Galway city with Castlebar. The route is of poor quality with a few short good sections in County Mayo between Ballintubber and Ballinrobe. Ballinrobe has become a bottleneck on the route in recent years with up to 8,000 vehicles passing through the town's one-way streets. A bypass for the town is in the planning. The R307 connects the N84 from the N5 Castlebar bypass, into Castlebar centre.

== Route ==
- Galway – Cloonboo – Headford – Shrule – Kilmaine – Ballinrobe – Partry – Castlebar

== See also ==
- Roads in Ireland
- Motorways in Ireland
- National primary road
- Regional road
