= Castlereagh (County Roscommon barony) =

Castlereagh An Caisleán Riabhach (Irish)
- Barony
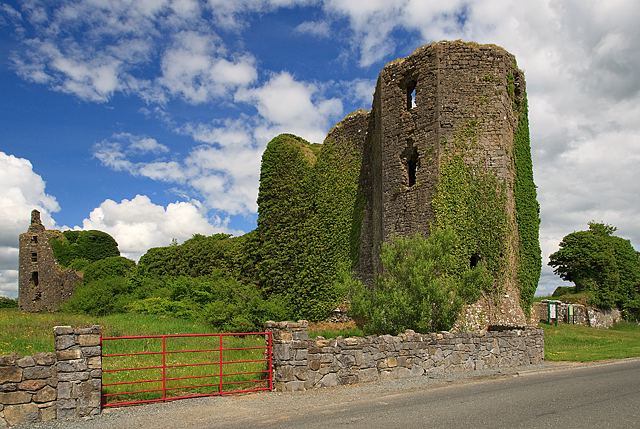
- Ballintober Castle

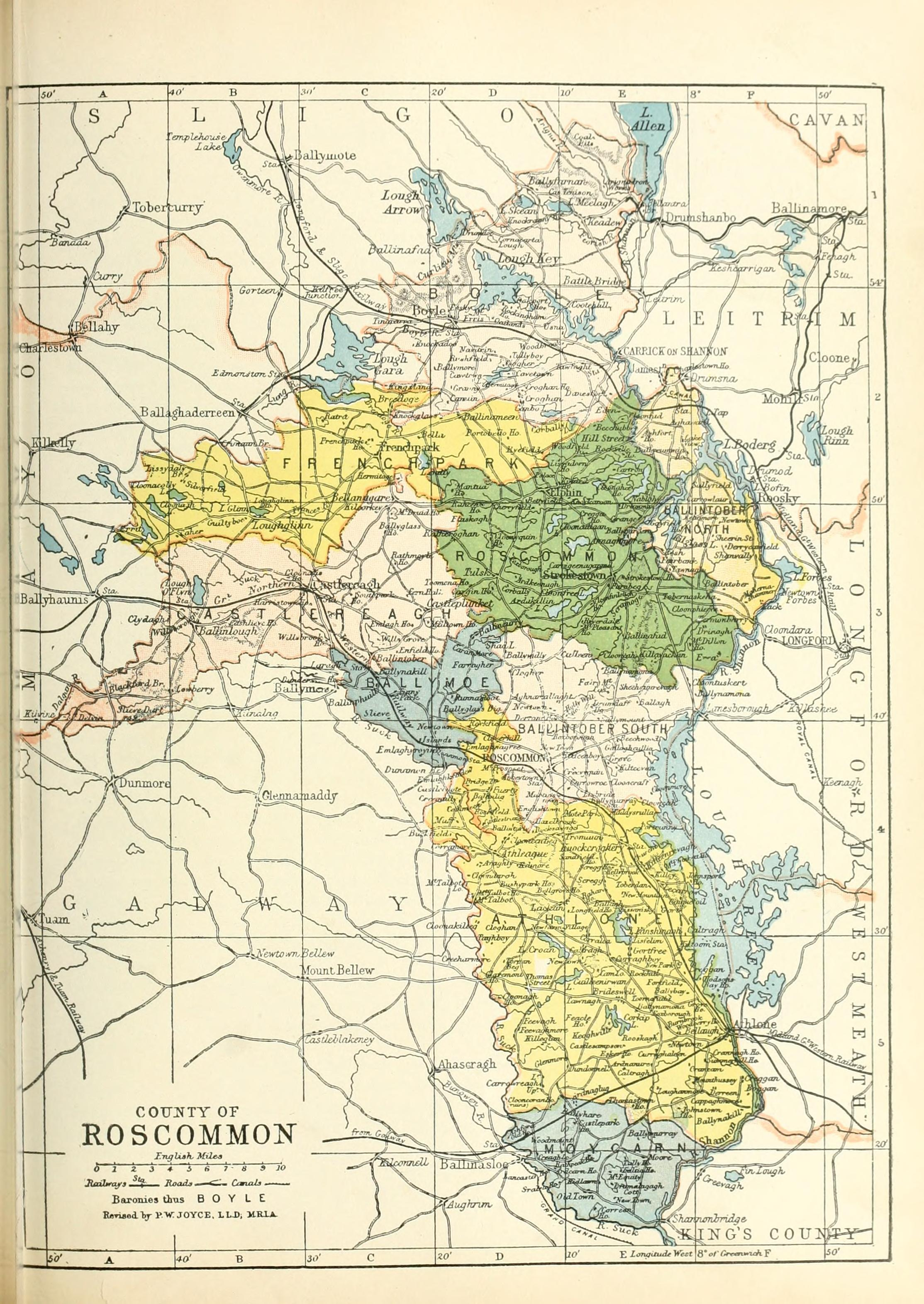
- Barony map of County Roscommon, 1900; Castlereagh is coloured peach, in the northwest.
- Sovereign state: Ireland
- Province: Connacht
- County: Roscommon

Area
  - Total: 332.17 km^{2} (128.25 sq mi)

Castlereagh (Irish: An Caisleán Riabhach) is a barony in County Roscommon, Ireland. It is named after the town of Castlerea within the barony. Its area in 1891 was 82,081 acres (33,217 ha).

It contains five civil parishes: Ballintober, Baslick, Kilkeevin, Kilcorkey, and Kiltullagh; including the towns of Ballinlough, Bellanagare, Castlerea, and Cloonfad.

== History ==
Castlereagh barony was anciently part of the territory of the Síol Maelruain, ruled by the Flynn (Ó Floinn) family, whose name survive in the large lake in the barony, Lough O'Flynn.

From the 18th century onward the Wills and Sandford families were the main landlords (see: Baron Mount Sandford).

== List of settlements ==
Below is a list of settlements in Castlereagh barony:

- Ballinlough
- Ballintober
- Bellanagare
- Castleplunket
- Castlerea
- Cloonfad
