= St Aidan's GAA =

St Aidan's GAA may refer to:

- Ferns St Aidan's GAA, a sports club in County Wexford, Ireland
- St Aidan's GAA (Roscommon), a sports club in Ballyforan, Dysart, Four Roads & Mount Talbot in the west-midlands of Ireland
- Templeport St Aidan's, a sports club in County Cavan, Ireland
