= Edenderry (disambiguation) =

Edenderry is a town in County Offaly, Ireland.

Edenderry may also refer to several other things on the island of Ireland:

- Edenderry, County Armagh, Northern Ireland, a townland; see List of townlands of County Armagh
- Edenderry, County Down, Northern Ireland, a small village and townland south of Belfast
- Edenderry, County Down, Northern Ireland, a townland southeast of Banbridge; see List of townlands of County Down
- Edenderry RFC, a rugby union club in County Kildare, Republic of Ireland
- Edenderry GAA, a Gaelic games club in the County Offaly town
- Edenderry Power Station, near the County Offaly town
- Edenderry Town F.C., a soccer club in the County Offaly town
- Edenderry, County Tyrone, Northern Ireland, a small village
