= Kiltullagh Church =

Archaeological site, County Roscommon, Ireland

- Cill Tulach
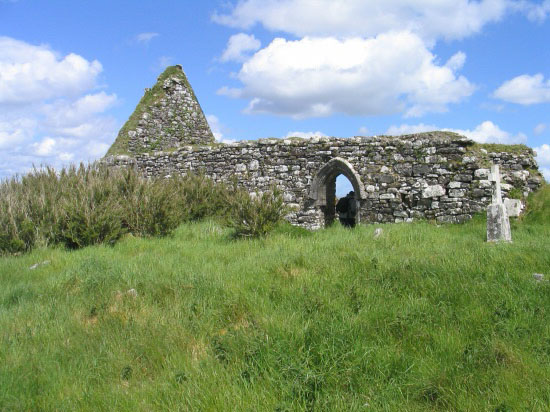
- Kiltullagh Hill, Kiltullagh, Roscommon

- Location within Ireland
- Interactive map of Kiltullagh Church

Monastery information
- Other name: Cill Tulach
- Order: Canons Regular of Saint Augustine
- Established: 1441
- Disestablished: 1600s
- Diocese: Tuam

Architecture
- Status: ruined
- Style: Irish

Site
- Location: Kiltullagh, Roscommon, County Roscommon
- Coordinates: 53.7128367°N 8.7084105°W
- Public access: yes

Kiltullagh Church (Irish: Cill Tulach, meaning 'church of the hills') is a former Christian church and burial site located in County Roscommon, Ireland. Several archaeological digs have taken place on the site that have revealed evidence of Christian activity on the site early as the fifth century. Evidence of earlier pagan worship and burials have also been found.

The church is in ruin, the result of the actions of Cromwellian forces in the mid-17th century most likely headed by Henry Ireton. Evidence of an earlier wooden structure has also been found near to the site of the ruined stone church.

== Location ==
Kiltullagh Church is located on Kiltullagh Hill, which is to the southwest of Ballinlough in County Roscommon.

== History ==
The history of Kiltullagh Church dates back to the fifth century. Archaeological digs have established Christian activity back to that date. Before that period, researchers have found evidence of pagan burials on the same site. Excavations by the University of Belfast have dated the remains of the current structure to 1441. The now-ruined building is believed to have been destroyed in the mid seventeenth century by forces under the command of Henry Ireton, the son of Oliver Cromwell, who was responsible for the majority of the destruction of the religious sites in Ireland at the time.

Before the building of the present structure of the church, a monastery was situated on top of the hill. Though little is known about the older Franciscan Monastery, its foundations can be observed on the east side of the remaining structure, though much overgrown.

== Building ==
Little of the original structure remain, The nave and elements of the surrounding walls and transepts still clearly be seen. As the interior is in ruin, the nave is now used to house graves of the dead.

== Present day ==
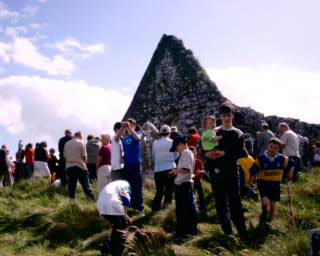
Kiltullagh Hill, Kiltullagh, Roscommon

Although still part of the local parish, the church is infrequently used today due to its remote location and ruined state. Its chief use is for the visitation of relatives buried in its grounds, and as a viewpoint for Lough O'Flynn. In the mid 2000s, a road was built by the local parish to facilitate access for tourists and religious processions. The most recent burial was in the 1990s.
