= R363 road (Ireland) =

Road in Ireland

R363 road
- Bóthar R363
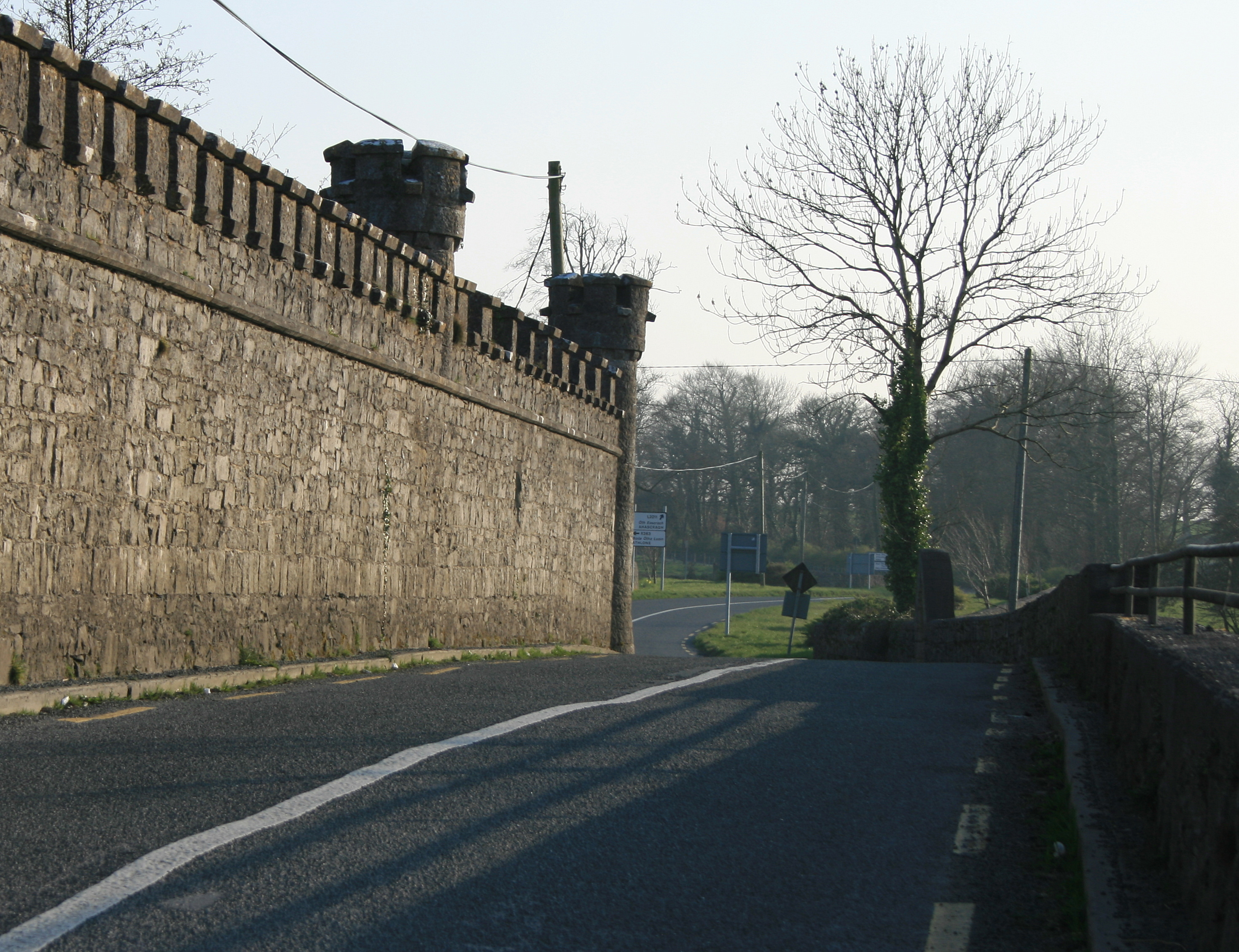
- R363 crossing the River Shevin at Ballynamore Bridge

Route information
- Length: 28 km (17 mi)

Location
- Country: Ireland
- Primary destinations: County Galway; Newbridge – leave the N63; Ballynamore Bridge - crosses the River Shiven; Crosses the River Suck; County Roscommon; Ballyforan; Dysart, County Roscommon – (R357); Brideswell; Terminates at the R362

Highway system
- Roads in Ireland; Motorways; Primary; Secondary; Regional

The R363 road is a regional road in Ireland linking Newbridge, County Galway to the R362 west of Athlone. It passes through Ballynamore Bridge where it crosses the River Shiven. It then crosses the River Suck into County Roscommon at Ballyforan and goes through Dysart, County Roscommon before terminating.

The road is 28 km (17 mi) long.

== See also ==
- Roads in Ireland
- National primary road
- National secondary road
