= Old Town, County Roscommon =

Village in County Roscommon, Ireland

Old Town An Seanbhaile
- Village
- Location in Ireland
- Coordinates: 53°17′55″N 8°07′20″W
- Country: Ireland
- Province: Connacht
- County: County Roscommon
- Elevation: 70 m (230 ft)
- Time zone: UTC+0 (WET)
  - Summer (DST): UTC-1 (IST (WEST))
- Irish Grid Reference: M919275

Old Town (Irish: an Seanbhaile) is a small village in the townland of Cloonfad in County Roscommon, Ireland. It is located on the R357 road between Ballinasloe, County Galway and Shannonbridge, County Offaly. The village post office, which had been operated by the Kenny family for many generations, closed in January 2008. The church for the area is known as Clonfad Church, in the Parish of Moore.

== See also ==
- List of towns and villages in Ireland
