= Lough Ree Power Station =

Power station in Lanesborough, Ireland

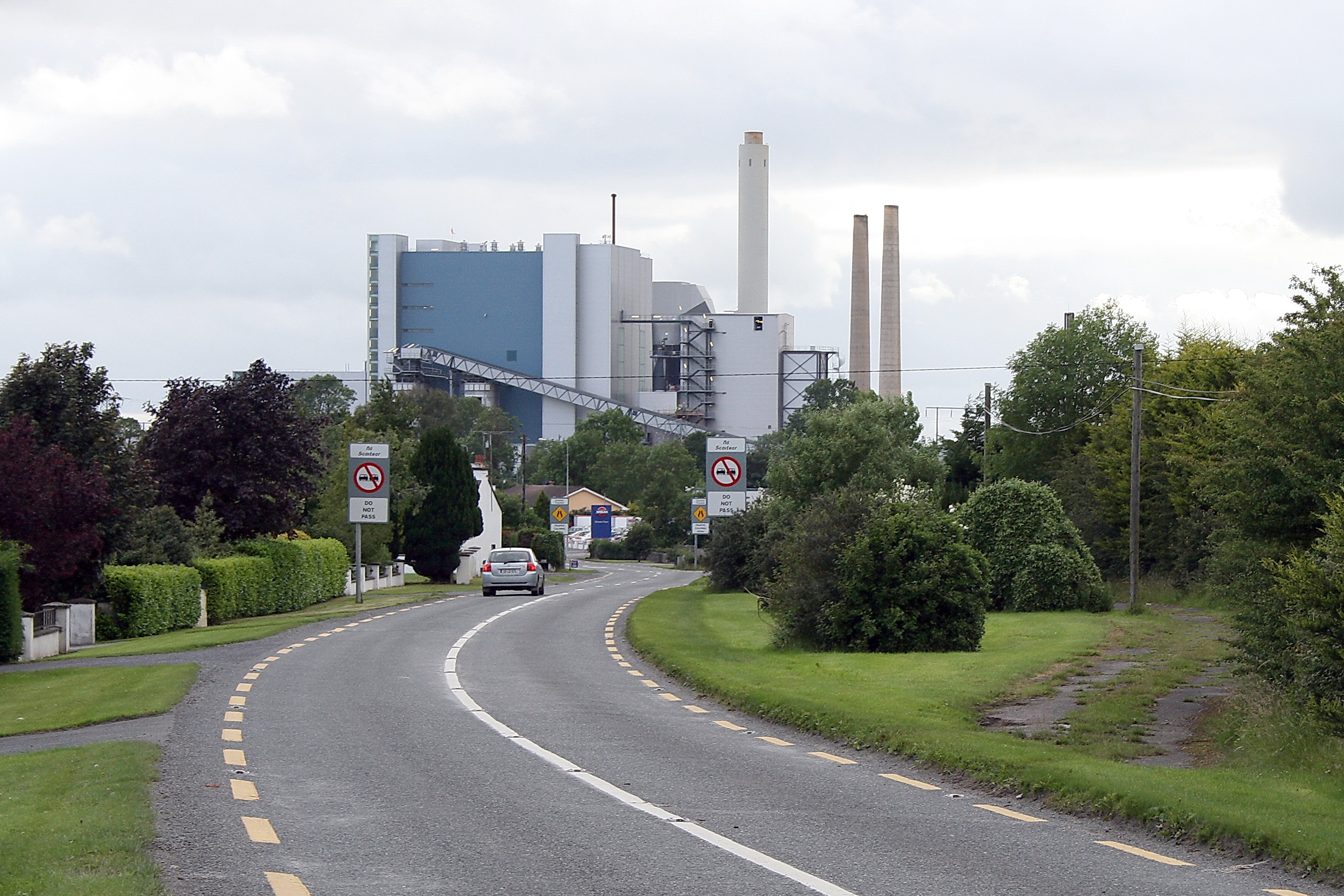
- Country: Ireland
- Location: Lanesborough
- Coordinates: 53°40′28″N 07°59′02″W
- Status: Inactive
- Commission date: April 2004
- Owner: Electricity Supply Board

Thermal power station
- Primary fuel: Peat

Power generation
- Nameplate capacity: 100 MWe

Lough Ree Power Station was a large peat-fired power station in Lanesborough, in Ireland. The station generated up 100 MWe of power, ranking as the third largest peat-fired power station in the country after West Offaly Power Station at 150 MWe and Edenderry Power Station at 120 MWe. The power station was constructed as a replacement to the ageing 85 MWe Lanesborough power station. The plant closed on 18 December 2020.

The power station building is 57 metres, its chimney 80 metres tall.

== See also ==
- List of largest power stations in the world
- List of power stations in the Republic of Ireland
