= Clonmacnoise and West Offaly Railway =

Railway in Ireland

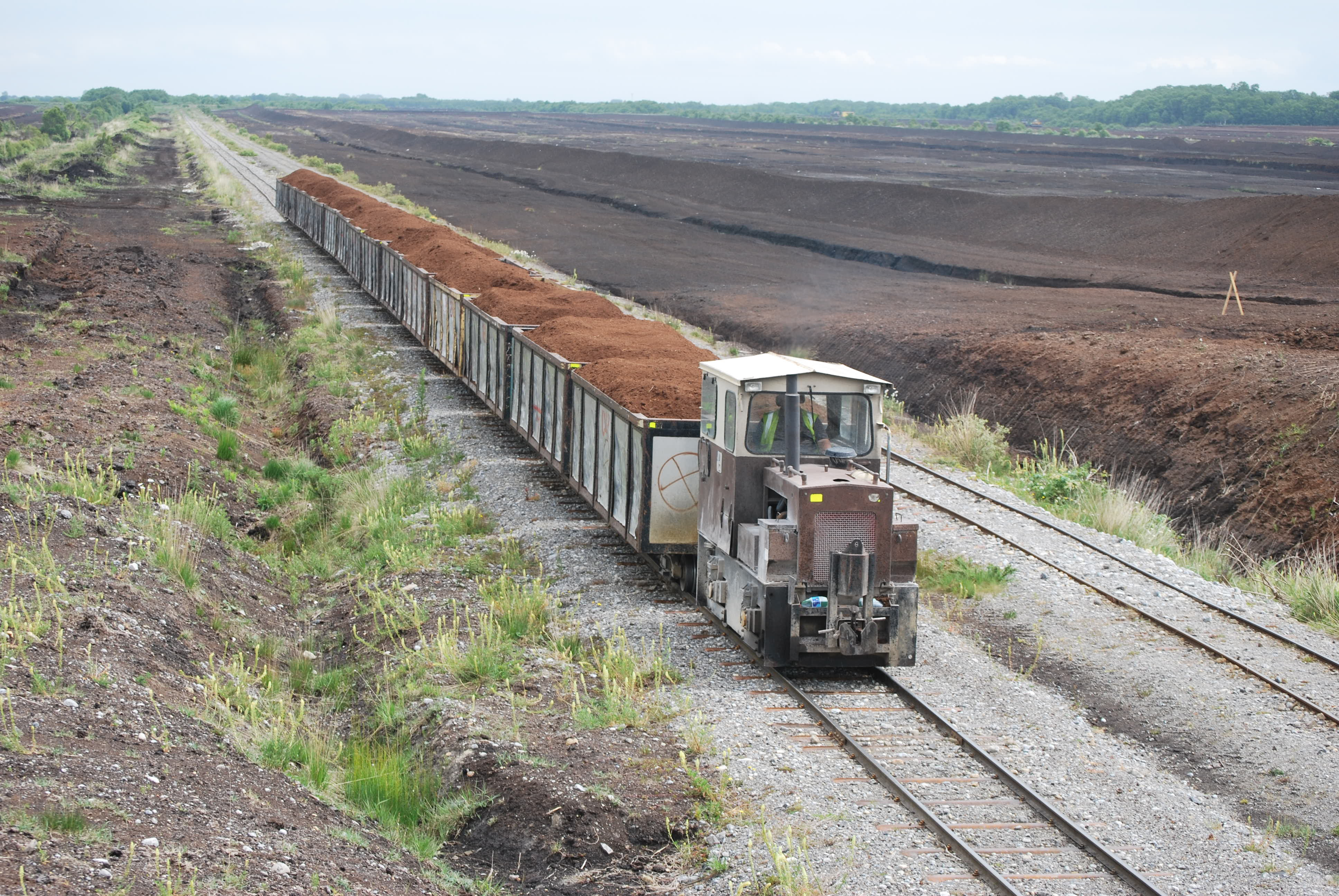
Clonmacnoise and West Offaly Railway

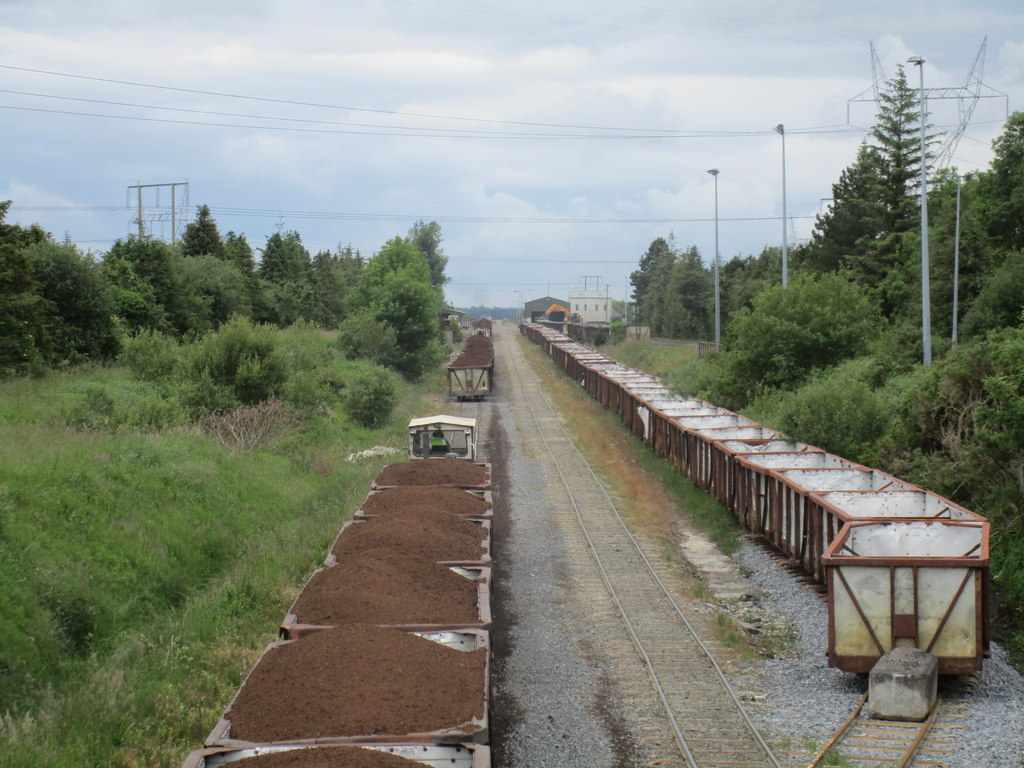
Clonmacnoise and West Offaly Railway: A succession of trains (here three are visible) bring milled peat to the Shannonbridge electricity generating station.

The Clonmacnoise and West Offaly Railway was a narrow-gauge industrial railway in the Midlands of Ireland.

== Origins and structure ==
Adapted from an industrial line constructed for hauling newly-cut peat, this 3 ft (914 mm) narrow-gauge railway was operated by the peat-harvesting company Bord na Móna and conveyed visitors over a (5.5 mile) 9-km line running through Blackwater Bog, near Shannonbridge, County Offaly. The tour was described as a "journey across this desert of modern cutaway" ... "like a journey through time". A small diesel locomotive hauled a single 53-seat passenger coach.

Facilities included a small shop with art and craft goods, a cafe and a museum of machines.

== Closure and plans ==
The railway was a tourist attraction in County Offaly. However, it closed permanently at the end of 2008 as operation of the line was interfering with the heavy flow of peat traffic bound for the Electricity Supply Board's West Offaly Power Generation Station.

The railway and associated visitor services aimed to reflect the historic importance of peat as an indigenous fuel in Ireland and to show visitors how milled peat was produced and transported to power stations. Bord na Móna has reportedly investigated the provision of an alternative tourism facility for the area.

== Naming and promotion ==
The railway was also sometimes known (and described on road signs) as the Blackwater Railway, the Shannonbridge Bog Railway, and the Bog Railway. It was promoted as "the only one of its kind in Europe".

== See also ==
- Clonmacnoise
- List of narrow-gauge railways in Ireland
