= R363 road =

R363 road may refer to:

- R363 road (Ireland)
- R363 road (South Africa)
