= Bórd na Móna =

Irish semi-state energy company

Bord na Móna
- Formerly: Bord na Móna
- Type: Public – Semi-State Company
- Founded: June 21, 1946; 80 years ago in Ireland
- Headquarters: Newbridge, County Kildare, Ireland
- Key people: Tom Donnellan (CEO)
- Revenue: ▲€ 380.4 million (2019)
- Number of employees: c.1,000 (2020)
- Divisions: Powergen Development; Resource Recovery; Energy; New Business
- Website: Official website

Bord na Móna (Irish: [ˌbˠoːɾˠd̪ˠ nˠə ˈmˠoːnˠə]; English: "The Peat Board"), currently branded as BnM, is a semi-state company in Ireland.

The company was created by the Turf Development Act 1946 to mechanize the harvesting of peat to boost the economy of Midlands communities and the energy security of Ireland.

Over the years, Bord na Móna has expanded and diversified its portfolio of businesses to include biomass procurement and supply, power generation (peat-based and renewable), waste recovery, domestic fuel products, professional and consumer horticulture products, eco-tourism, and community amenities.

In 2015, the company announced that it would cease harvesting peat for power generation by 2030, but would continue to do so for its horticulture and fuels businesses. Some have criticised the state subsidies for the company, and the extraction of turf as the most environmentally unfriendly form of fuel and hurting local biodiversity.

== History ==
Bord na Móna was originally established in 1933 as the Turf Development Board, Limited. The reason for the formation of the Turf Development Board was "to develop and improve the Turf Industry..." and "...to operate and drain bogs...". Later, in 1946 the Turf Development Board changed its name to Bord na Móna under the Turf Development Act 1946. This move saw a change in status from that of a limited liability company to a statutory company as well as some significant changes in strategy and operations.

World War II boosted the development of Ireland's peat industry and led to the foundation of Bord na Móna in 1946. During the war, coal imports declined in quantity and quality, prompting the development of emergency fuel schemes, particularly on the use of peat, both inside and outside of traditional turf areas. It is estimated that before the war the annual production of turf per year was three million tons. The war effort added two million tons a year to this. The use of peat as a fuel source during World War II reinforced the government's commitment to develop Ireland's bogs as an indigenous source of energy.

After the war, the Irish government had a renewed focus on "the production of turf by mechanical processes and its sale at prices that cause it to compete effectively with other fuels". The war raised a valid concern around the security of indigenous fuel for Ireland. The resulting solution was a white paper issued by the government setting out what later became known as the First Development Programme.

Up to the 1950s, Ireland's bogs were harvested for turf, but from the 1950s right through to modern times the bogs were harvested for milled peat. This new method of peat harvesting gave way to harvesting on a scale not yet seen before in Ireland. The primary counties for peat harvesting were Kildare, Offaly, Galway, Longford, Roscommon, and Tipperary. These areas continue to be the main areas of peat production.

In 2018, West Offaly and Lough Ree power stations received €87.75 million from the taxpayer to operate under the public service obligation (PSO) scheme. 5.3% of Irish homes used peat for heating. In 2020, the Bord na Móna announced that it was phasing out peat harvesting in Ireland. No jobs would be lost, and existing peat workers would be reassigned to bog reclamation projects rather than laid off.

On 15 January 2021, it was announced that peat briquettes would no longer be available after 2024.

In September 2025, it was announced that Bord na Móna had changed its name to BnM.

== Biodiversity ==
Bord na Móna has been responsible for both gains and losses of biodiversity across the bogs under their control. This loss of biodiversity is due to the company's operations which progressively altered the terrain of bogs in their ownership. Bord na Móna has made considerable effort to offset the impact of their operations over the years. In the 1970s, a group of Bord na Móna employees, led by Tom Barry who was Peatland Environmental Officer at the time, drove an initiative to preserve a number of bogs, including Pollardstown Fen located in County Kildare and Raheenmore Bog in County Offaly. During the 1980s and 1990s, another internal drive saw the conservation of more bogs, including Bellacorick Flush County Mayo, Mongan Bog, Clara Bog, and All Saints Bog in County Offaly. These bogs are now owned and managed by An Taisce, the National Parks and Wildlife Service, and other organisations.

In 2010, Bord na Móna launched its first Biodiversity Action Plan. This plan set out a number of objectives and actions to be carried out over a five-year period 2010–2015. It gave an overview of rehabilitation work, natural colonisation projects, and the biodiversity of the company's cutaway bogs. It also highlighted the biodiversity projects in progress and those completed. In 2016, Bord na Móna released a second biodiversity action plan. This subsequent plan was developed to build upon the objectives of the first action plan while also looking to the future of Bord na Móna's peatlands with regard to its announcement to stop harvesting peat for electricity production by 2030. Speaking about the biodiversity action plans, senior ecologist, Catherine Farrell said "We all need to work together in Bord na Móna to ensure the best outcomes for rehabilitation and biodiversity. This will be critical to the delivery of our Biodiversity Action Plans".

The flagellated protist, Bordnamonas, was named after Bord na Móna by Jacob Larsen (a Danish phycologist) and David J. Patterson an Irish protzoologist.

== Harvesting ==
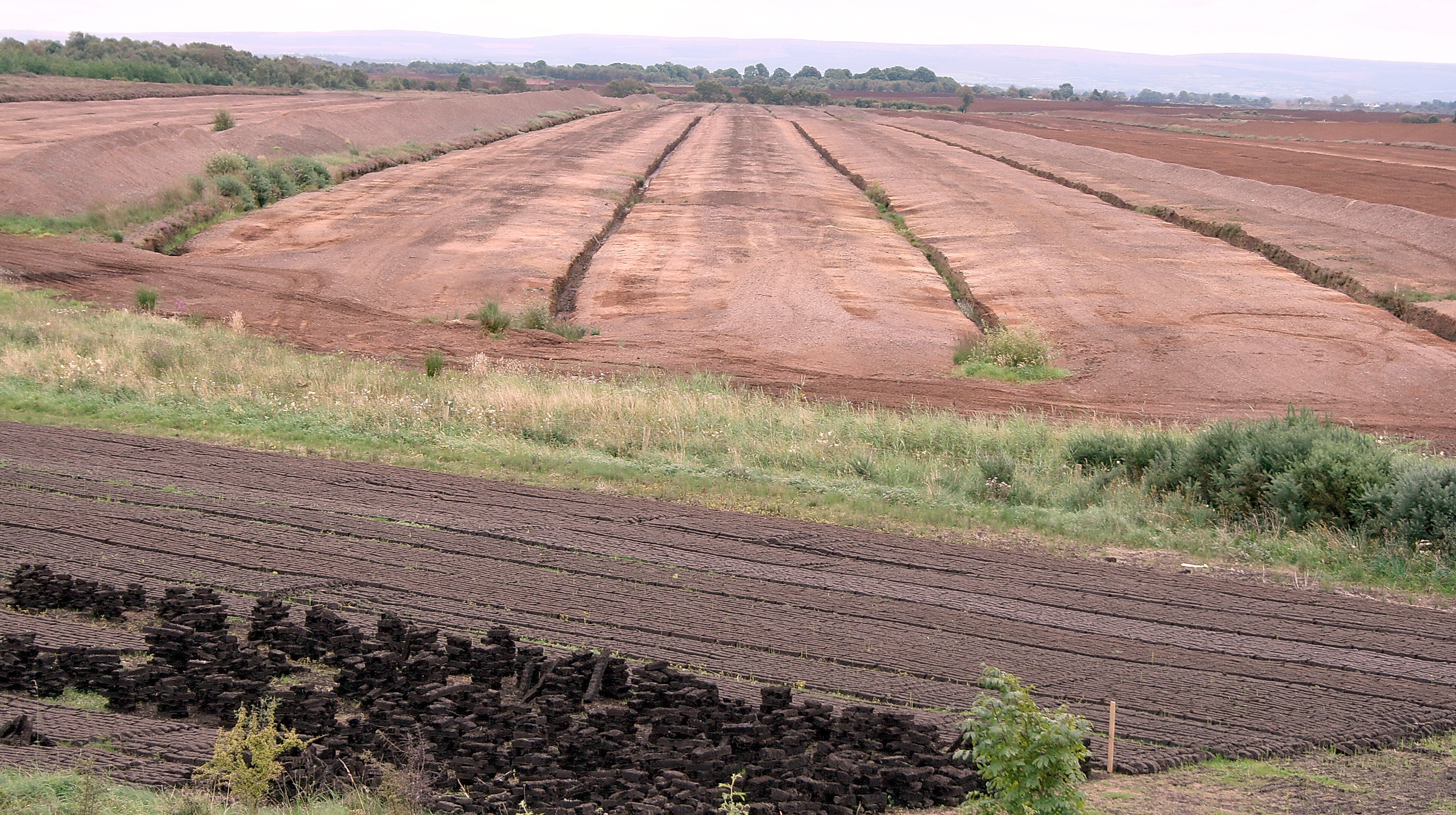
BnM milled peat harvesting in the Bog of Allen

Peat was traditionally manually harvested by operating cutaway bogs. This method (still privately used today) consists of sods being vertically cut from the side face of a peat deposit. Technology was derived to mechanically cut and remove layers of peat from blanket bogs. Today, equipment is used to remove tonnes of peat each day at suitable times of year (rainfall is a significant variable in peat harvesting). Almost all the peat now harvested is milled peat, scraped from the surface of the bog by tractor-towed pin millers. The milled peat is ridged into small piles which are then transferred by harvesters into large piles running parallel along the bog. Railways are laid alongside each pile, the pile loaded into trains and the railway lifted and moved to the next pile. This is the 'Peco' method of working. A few bogs use the 'Haku' method whereby the milled peat is loaded into tractor-towed caterpillar-tracked trailers and deposited in a single heap at the edge of the bog adjacent to a railway line. Each year, the network of drainage ditches is deepened by a few inches before the next harvest.

Bord na Móna has developed a number of products which were novel developments in their time. Peat briquettes largely replaced sods of raw peat as a domestic fuel. These briquettes consisted of shredded peat, compressed to form a slow-burning, easily stored and transported fuel. The first peat briquette factory built by the Board, the Derrinlough briquette factory in Offaly opened in 1959, was financed with a loan of £500,000 from Guinness in 1957. Derrinlough, the last remaining briquette factory, out of four in total, closed in June 2023. Another product developed was peat moss, a combination of peat and soil used in gardening, particularly for pot plants. The company also supplied peat to power stations of the Electricity Supply Board and its own power station, Edenderry Power.The ESB peat stations were all closed by 2021 and Edenderry Power transitioned to 100% biomass in December 2023, ending all peat use by the company.

== Railways ==
Bord na Móna had one of the largest industrial railways in Europe, which carried up to 4 million tonnes annually over 550 miles of rail.

Permanent railways ran from a hundred peat bogs, each covering hundreds of acres, to power stations, briquette factories, moss peat factories and roadside tipplers. On most of the bogs, temporary tracks were laid along piles of peat. Before a pile was cleared, another temporary line was laid a few hundred feet farther along. More than 300 kilometres (approx 180 miles) of temporary track were laid each year and the Bord had specialist track fabrication workshops, tracklaying machines, and a fleet of dedicated locomotives and rolling stock on hand. A few bogs were operated by the Haku process, where the peat is collected in one huge heap at the end or side of a bog, requiring only one railway line to serve it.

An extensive 3 ft (914 mm) narrow gauge network was operated by the company in the midlands. Some smaller sections of railway were used in other bog locations, such as in County Donegal.

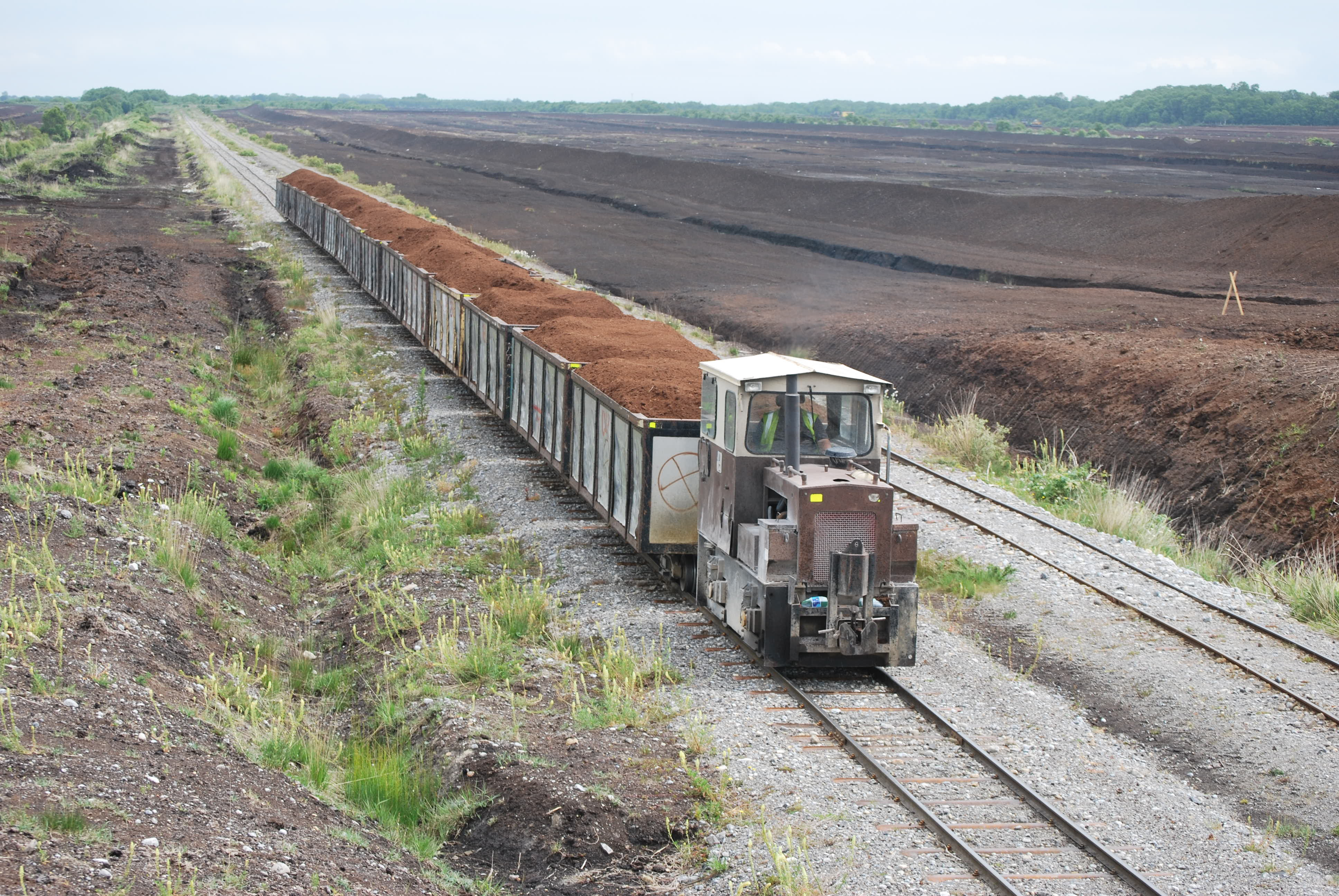
Clonmacnoise and West Offaly Railway

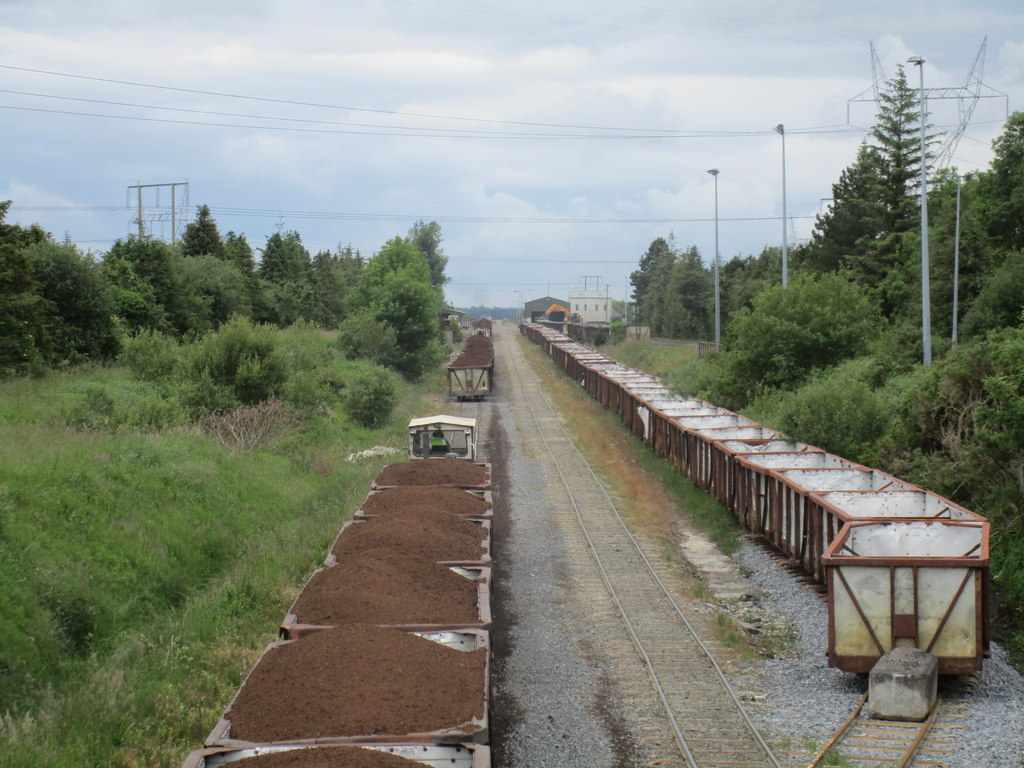
Clonmacnoise and West Offaly Railway: a succession of trains (here three are visible) bring milled peat to the Shannonbridge electricity generating station

Part of the Blackwater bog system was also used for tourist trains – the Clonmacnoise and West Offaly Railway (colloquially the "Bog Train") for about twelve years. This service ceased permanently in October 2008, for it interfered with the heavy peat traffic heading for West Offaly Power Station. One line of the Blackwater system ran along a section of the former Ballinasloe branch canal. This includes a section where the railway runs through Kylemore Lock. The newest branch of this system runs north from existing bogs at Bloomhill to the new bogs of Kilgarvan and Bunnahinley – the latter in the outskirts of Athlone – and opened for traffic c. 2011.

All three of Bord na Móna's old steam locomotives are preserved, one by the Irish Steam Preservation Society at Stradbally, County Laois.

Each of the three power stations – West Offaly at Shannonbridge, County Offaly; Edenderry, County Offaly; and Lough Ree, Lanesborough, County Longford, was the hub of an extensive rail network carrying heavy traffic. As an example, twelve trains or rakes (locomotive and sixteen wagons) were in daily use sixteen hours a day at West Offaly in April 2009. Other, generally older locomotives, handled fuel trains, track trainloads of track, ash trains, and permanent way gangs. As of 2012 the Edenderry Power Station derived much of its fuel from woodchips and other types of biomass. Thus, the amount of peat arriving by rail is diminishing.

The two briquette factories at Derrinlough, County Offaly, and Littleton, County Tipperary, each had rail connections to six or eight working bogs. Between four and six peat trains worked on each system, the trains almost always travelling in pairs.

Bord na Móna also operated several smaller bog railways delivering the peat to tipplers for transfer by road to factories and power stations. These could be found at Gilltown, Ummeras, Kilberry, Prosperous and Almhain North, in County Kildare, at Coolnamona in County Laois, Derryfadda in Galway, Coolnagun, Ballivor and Kinnegad in Westmeath, Monettia, Bellair and Killaun in Offaly, and Templetuohy on the Tipperary / Kilkenny border. The Coolnamona Works is largely closed but the railway system was upgraded in 2010/11 to serve a new tippler supplying peat by road to Littleton (Lanespark) Briquette Factory.

Locomotives and rolling stock, for many years bought in from outside companies, were later designed and built in-house. New locomotives were 0-4-0DH (diesel-hydraulic) or 4wDH (no connecting rods). Most peat wagons were of the bogie type, with aluminium bodies to reduce weight, though there were still thirty or so old steel-bodied wagons in use as of 2009. Templetuohy, their last traditional sod peat operation, used four-wheeled open-slatted wagons which end tip into waiting lorries.

With the ending of peat harvesting, the Bord na Móna railway system will cease operations. As part of the rundown of services, two of the most modern locomotives were sold to the Isle of Man Railway in 2024.

== Land reclamation ==
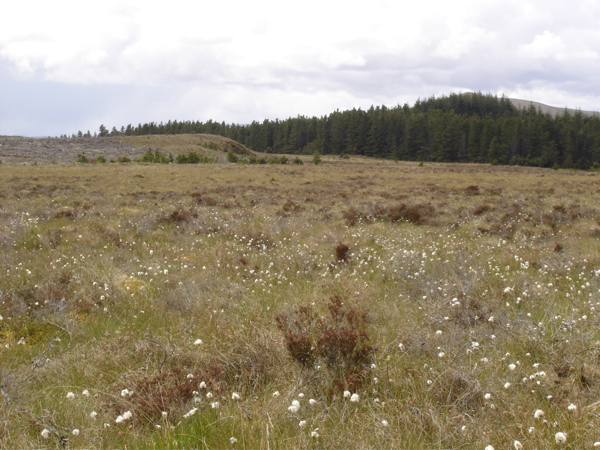
Bog land covered with trees for land reclamation

The company is responsible, under government action, for reclaiming spent bogland. These areas of land are usually cleared up, with trees or other suitable vegetation being introduced. Reclaimed bogland is then usually used as a wildlife preserve. With much of the bogs of Ireland depleted, peat-fired electricity stations all closed by 2020. Rhode Power Station near Edenderry, County Offaly, had its cooling towers demolished on 16 March 2004 as it was no longer viable, followed by Bellacorick in north County Mayo on 14 October 2007. The West Offaly Power Station in Shannonbridge was scheduled to be demolished in 2020 or 2021. The demolition had been postponed to at least 2027, but now is planned for 2026.

== See also ==
- List of companies of Ireland
- List of narrow-gauge railways in Ireland
- Peat in Finland – another EU member still burning significant amount of peat for energy generation
