= Clonony =

Village in County Offaly, Ireland

Clonony Cluain Damhna
- Village
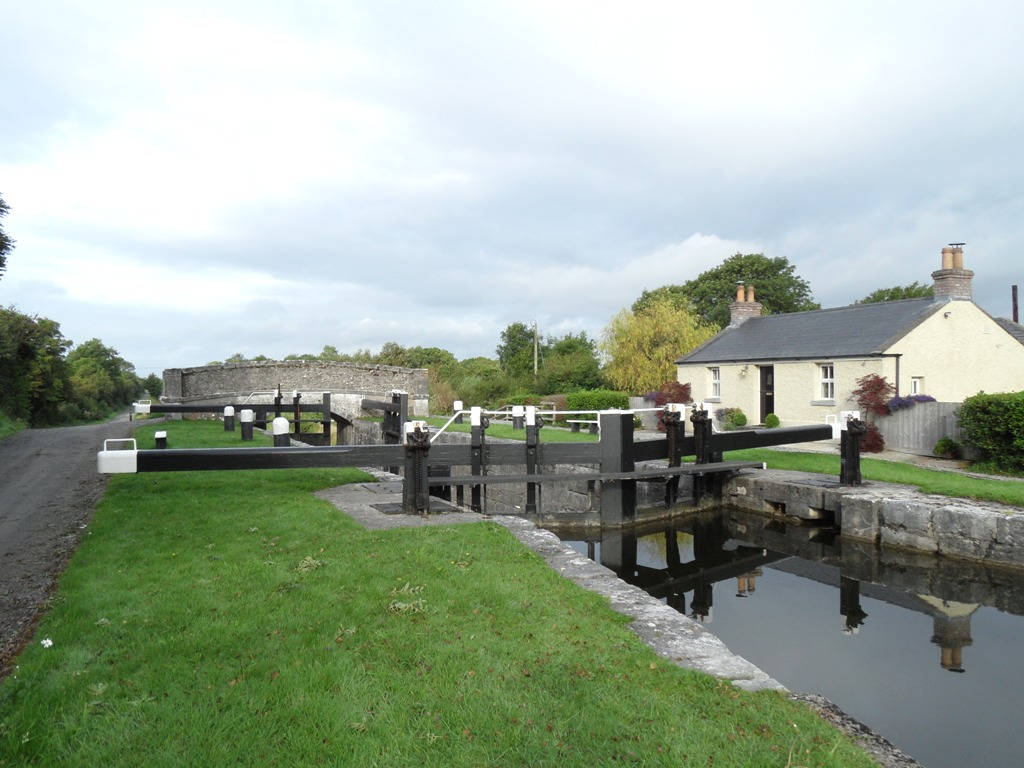
- Clonony Bridge (and lock) on the Grand Canal at Clonony

- Location in Ireland
- Coordinates: 53°14′N 7°55′W
- Country: Ireland
- Province: Leinster
- County: Offaly
- Time zone: UTC+0 (WET)
  - Summer (DST): UTC-1 (IST (WEST))

Clonony (Irish: Cluain Damhna Beag) is a small village in County Offaly, Ireland. It is noted for Clonony Castle, a late medieval tower house built in 1500. The village is between the River Brosna and the Grand Canal, in the parish of Gallen and Reynegh. The nearest town is Cloghan, 2.8 km (1.7 mi) to the south-east along the R357 road. Athlone is 22 km (14 mi) to the north.

== Clonony Castle ==
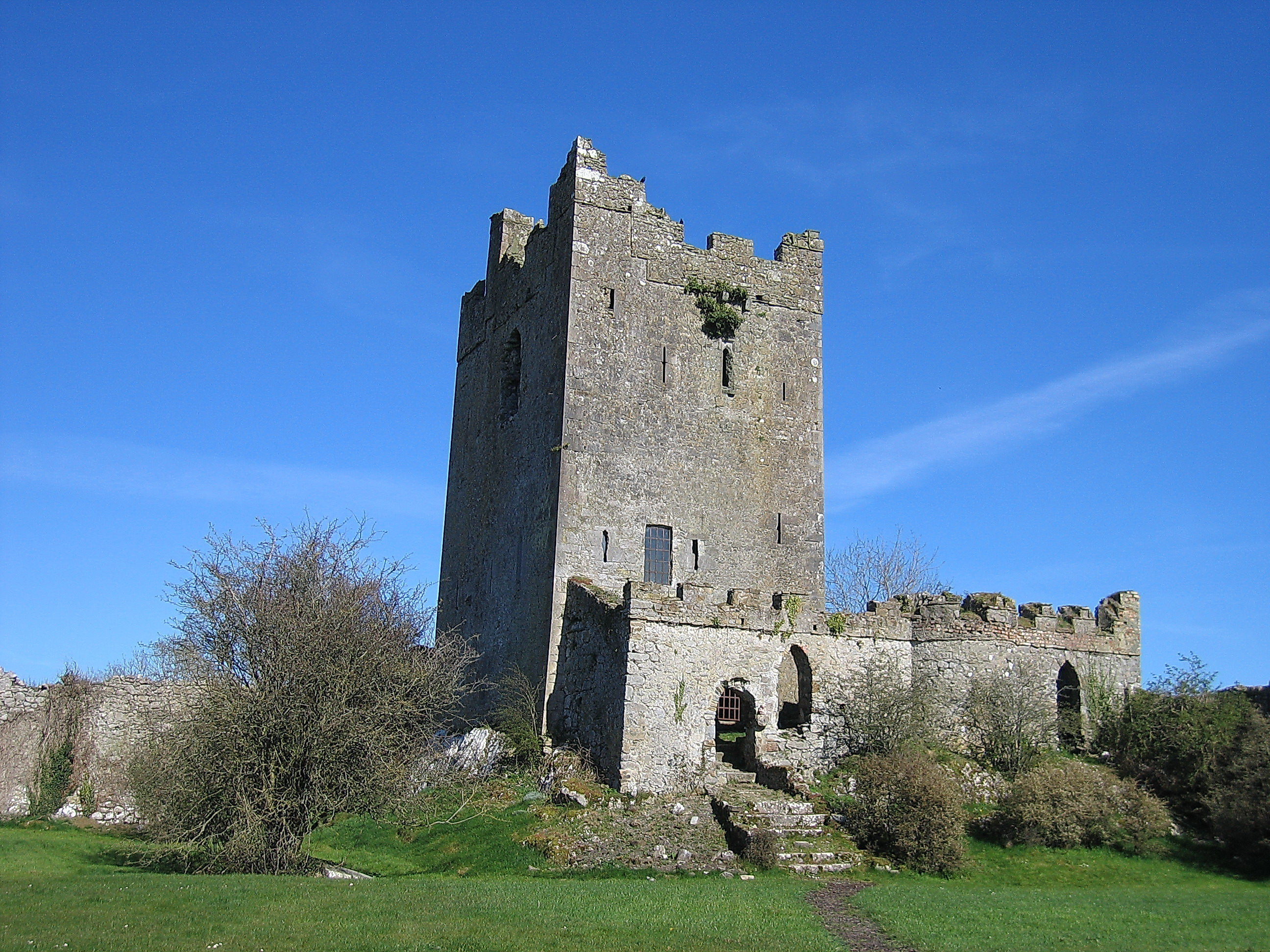
Clonony Castle

Clonony Castle (Caisleán Chluain Damhna) is a Tudor castle built by the MacCoughlan clan, and ceded to Henry VIII by John Óg MacCoghlan, then to Thomas Boleyn when Henry wanted to marry his daughter Anne. Mary and Elizabeth Boleyn, second cousins to Queen Elizabeth I, lived out their lives in this castle and their tombstone still stands on the castle grounds. The grave was discovered in 1803, approximately 100 yards from the castle. The inscription on the eight feet by four feet, limestone flag reads: "Here under leys Elisabeth and Mary Bullyn, daughters of Thomas Bullyn, son of George Bullyn the son of George Bullyn Viscount Rochford son of Sir Thomas Bullyn Erle of Ormond and Willsheere."

The castle was occupied from 1612 to about 1620 by Matthew de Renzi (1577–1634), a London cloth merchant originally from Cologne in Germany, who created the first English-Irish dictionary, according to his tombstone in Athlone. He acquired it after it had been forfeited by the MacCoghlans during the Nine Years' War.

The fifty-foot tower, an Irish National Monument, is surrounded by gardens and a moat. The castle is a few miles from Clonmacnoise, an ancient seat of Irish learning. Shannon Harbour and the towns of Cloghan, Banagher and Shannonbridge are close by. The castle is currently being restored, and is open to the public at no cost, and although there are no specific hours, the owners try to keep the castle open and encourage tours.

The castle has all the basic features of a tower house of this period such as machicolation, murder hole, base batter, mural passages, spiral staircase, gun-loops, garderobe and bawn. The first floor had collapsed but has been replaced in recent restoration works by the owners. The castle also boasts a barrel-vaulted ceiling making up the second floor which has been restored. The Tower House is three storeys high with an entrance in the west wall with a machicolation above it. There is a fire-proof vault over the ground floor in the interior and a spiral stair leads to the upper floors. There are round-headed, ogee-headed and flat headed windows. The bawn wall with its two square corner towers and entrance, which had a coat of arms, was reconstructed in the nineteenth century and gives a good impression of how an original Tower House might have looked, with a set of perimeter and internal defences. The inner bawn building in front of the west entrance appears to be a nineteenth-century construction.

The Annals of the Four Masters record "A great war broke out in Dealbhna between the descendants of Farrell Mac Coghlan and the descendants of Donnell, in the course of which James Mac Coghlan, Prior of Gailinne, and the Roydamna of Dealbhna Eathra, was killed by a shot fired from the castle of Cluain-damhna."

The castle has been extensively restored since 2010. It was listed for sale in 2022 described as a three-bedroom, two-bathroom site ... on three acres of land, with a large dining room, a study and a 'ladies chamber'.

== See also ==
- List of towns and villages in Ireland
