= Ballyforan =

Ballyforan Béal Átha Feorainne
- Village
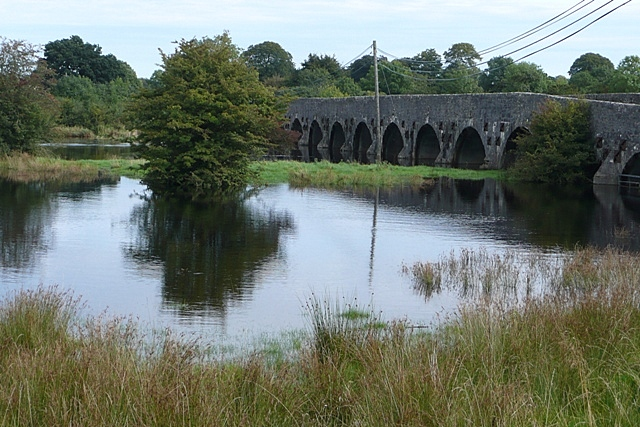
- Ballyforan Bridge (built c.1820)

- Location in Ireland
- Coordinates: 53°28′13″N 8°16′09″W
- Country: Ireland
- Province: Connacht
- County: County Roscommon

Population (2022)
  - Total: 227

Ballyforan (Irish: Béal Átha Feorainne, meaning 'approach to the ford at the grassy riverside') is a village in south County Roscommon, Ireland on the R363 road between Ballygar and Dysart. It lies beside the River Suck which separates County Roscommon and County Galway.

== Amenities ==
Amenities in the area include a post office, pub, grocery shop, school, health centre, GAA and snooker clubs, community centre, school and pre-school, and the Roman Catholic Church of St. Josephs (built in 1857). As of early 2020, the local national (primary) school, Ballyforan Mixed National School, had approximately 60 pupils enrolled.

== Notable people ==
Politician and sportsperson Jack McQuillan was born in Ballyforan. He won the All-Ireland Senior Football Championship twice, and represented Roscommon in Dáil Éireann from 1948 to 1965.

== See also ==
- List of towns and villages in Ireland
