= R357 road (Ireland) =

Road in Ireland

R357 road
- Bóthar R357
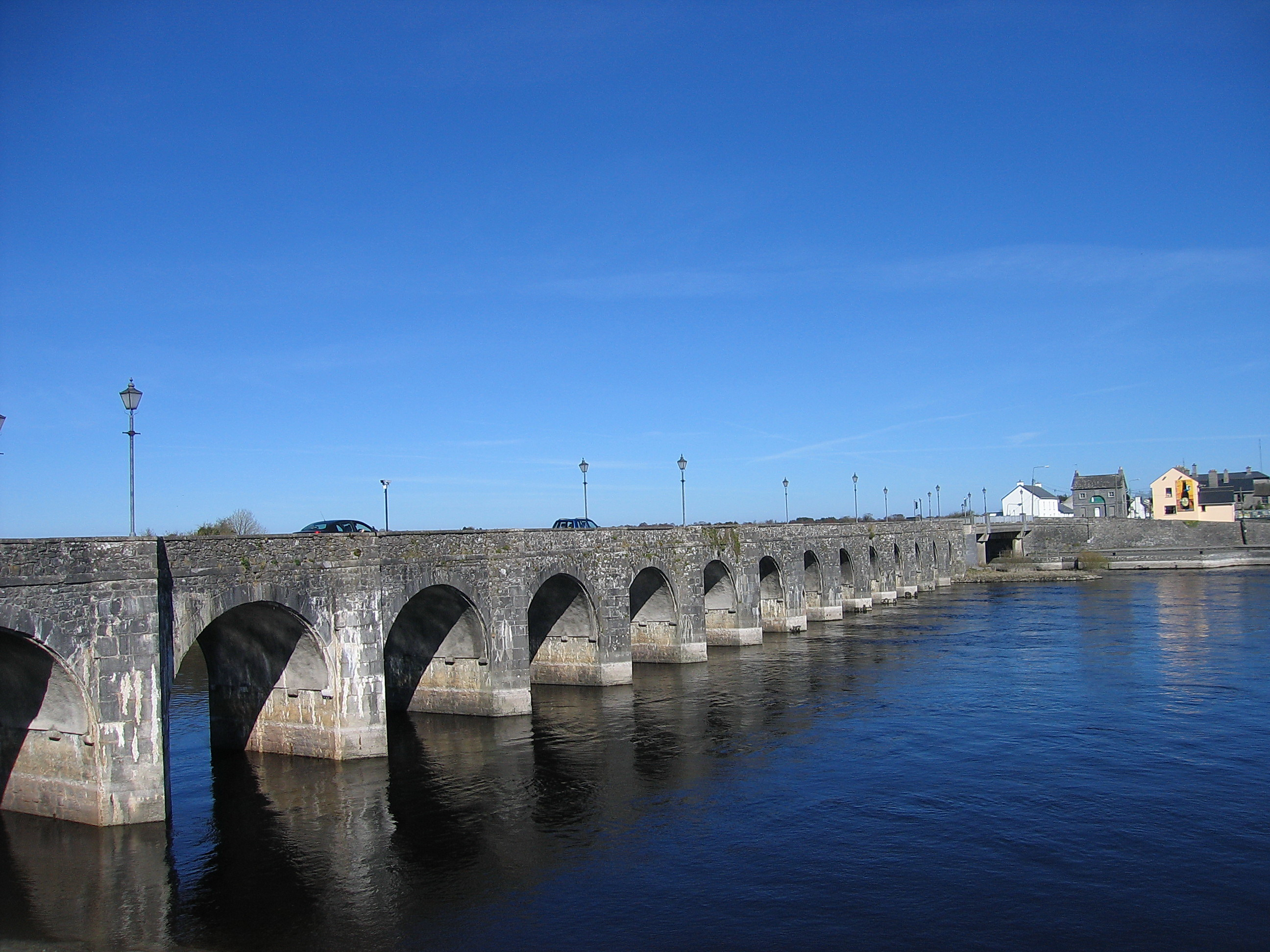
- R357 crossing the River Shannon at Shannonbridge

Route information
- Length: 76 km (47 mi)

Location
- Country: Ireland
- Primary destinations: County Roscommon; Athleague – leave the N63; Four Roads; Dysart, County Roscommon – (R363); Taghmaconnell; Newtown; County Galway; Ballinasloe – (R446); County Roscommon; Old Town; Cloonfad; County Offaly; Shannonbridge – Crosses the River Shannon, (R444); Clonony; Cloghan – (N62); (R437); Crosses the River Silver; Cross Boora Bog; Blue Ball – terminates at N52

Highway system
- Roads in Ireland; Motorways; Primary; Secondary; Regional

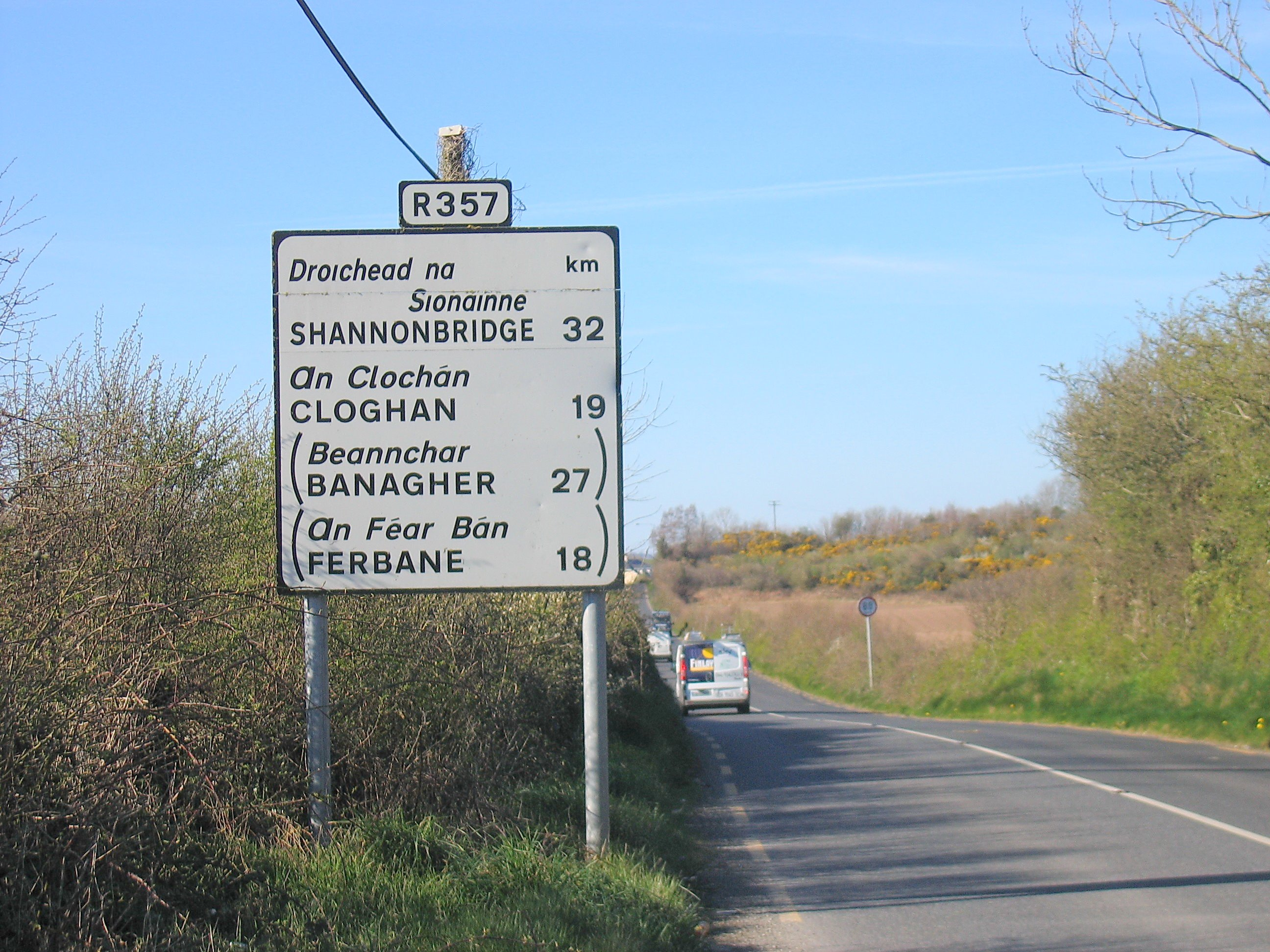
R357 at Blue Ball, County Offaly

The R357 road is a regional road in Ireland linking Athleague, County Roscommon and Blue Ball, County Offaly. It passes Ballinasloe, County Galway, crosses the River Shannon at Shannonbridge, passes through Cloghan, County Offaly and then through the cutaway peatlands of Boora Bog to Blue Ball where it terminates at the N52.

The road is 76 km (47 mi) long.

== See also ==
- Roads in Ireland
- National primary road
- National secondary road
