= Lough O'Flynn =

Lake in County Roscommon, Ireland

- Loch Uí Fhloinn (Irish)
- Location in Ireland
- Location: County Roscommon
- Coordinates: 53°45′52″N 8°37′52″W
- Primary inflows: River Suck
- Primary outflows: River Suck
- Catchment area: 18.35 km^{2} (7.1 sq mi)
- Basin countries: Ireland
- Max. length: 2.3 km (1.4 mi)
- Max. width: 0.8 km (0.5 mi)
- Surface area: 1.37 km^{2} (0.53 sq mi)
- Average depth: 4.5 m (15 ft)
- Max. depth: 16.5 m (54 ft)
- Surface elevation: 77 m (253 ft)

Lough O'Flynn (Irish: Loch Uí Fhloinn) is a freshwater lake in the west of Ireland. It is located in west County Roscommon and is the source of the River Suck.

== Name ==
The name is from the Gaelic Irish tribe of the Ó Floinn, who ruled the region known as Síol Maelruain in the Middle Ages. The tribe was one of the main families in Kiltullagh parish.

== Geography ==
Lough O'Flynn measures about 2 km (1.2 mi) long and 1 km (0.6 mi) wide. It is located about 10 km (6 mi) east of Ballyhaunis, just north of the village of Ballinlough and is the source of the River Suck. There is an artificial island known as a crannog in the lake; this is believed to date back to the Medieval period, when it would have been used as a place of safety to retreat to when under attack. There are marked trails along bog tracks leading around the lake, with views of the lake and river as well as surrounding areas of bog scrub, coniferous woodland and open peatland.

== Natural history ==
Fish species in Lough O'Flynn include roach, perch, brown trout, pike and the critically endangered European eel. Beside the lake is a raised bog, the Carrowbehy/Caher Bog, a Special Area of Conservation. Active raised bogs have a high percentage of sphagnum moss and new peat is being formed; in this case, there are hummocks and extensive quaking areas and many large steep-sided pools intersecting with each other. Besides the moss, typical plants are bogbean, cotton grass, bog sedge, white beak sedge and lesser bladderwort. On more degraded parts where peat removal has happened in the past, heather, bog asphodel, hare’s-tail cottongrass, deergrass and cross-leaved heath are to be found.

== See also ==
- List of loughs in Ireland
