= Derrinlough briquette factory =

Peat briquette factory in Ireland

Coordinates: 53.1841°N 7.8767°W

The Derrinlough briquette factory was a briquette manufacturing facility in County Offaly, Ireland, opened in 1960. It ceased production on 26 May 2023.

== History ==
The factory was constructed by Bord Na Mona from 1957 to 1959, near Birr in County Offaly. Production started in 1959 and it was officially opened in 1960. Part of the cost was financed by a £500,000 loan from Guinness in addition to other borrowings.

The original briquette factory in Lullymore was unable to meet market demands by the 1950s as it could only produce about 40000 tonnes per annum even after modifications. Plans were advanced for two new factories, one located in the Derrygreenagh group of bogs in east Offaly and a second in the Boora group in west Offaly. Construction of Derrinlough started in 1957, with Croghan starting soon after. Derrinlough began production in late 1959 with its official opening in 1960.

The Derrinlough facility has a design capacity of 135000 tonnes per annum. It is the last peat briquette factory in operation in Ireland (Lullymore closed in 1991, and Croghan in 2000, while the newest factory, in Littleton, closed in 2018). Production of peat briquettes is due to finish in Derrinlough in 2024 but due to poor quality raw material stocks and issues with plant reliability, the closure was brought forward to June 2023.

The briquette factory was scheduled to close in 2024, in line with Bord Na Mona's "Brown to Green" strategy. The Board has started construction on a 21 turbine 127 MW wind farm in early 2022. There are some other proposals for the reuse of the factory site but no plans are at an advanced stage at the time of the plant's final shutdown. The Board and Amazon Web Services signed an agreement in 2024 to develop data centers in the area.
