= Síol Maelruain =

Síol Maelruain was a territory located in north County Roscommon due west, from what is now Castlerea. Its lake, Lough O'Flynn, is the source of the River Suck and is located at the foot of Slieve O'Flynn mountain. The lordship was centered on the village of Ballinalough, its rulers been the Ó Floinn family. David Flynn (chaplain) (died 1770) was Chaplain to James III.

== Annalistic references ==
1104. Fiachra Ua Floinn, chief of Síol Maelruain, was killed by the Conmaicne.

1133. A great army of Leth Mogha under Cormac grandson of Carthach and Conchobor ua Briain went into Connachta and cut down the Ruadbeitheach and the Belata and killed Cathal son of Cathal, heir designate of Connachta, and Gilla na Naem ua Flainn, chief of Síl Maílruain.

1192. Hugh Ua Floinn, Chief of Síol Maelruain, died.

1200. Fiachra Ua Floinn, Chief of Síol Maelruain, died

1228. David Ó Floinn, Chief of Síol Maelruain, and Rory O'Mulrenin, died.

1240. Hugh, the son of Gilla Aa Naemh Crom O'Shaughnessy, was slain by Conor, son of Hugh, who was the son of Cathal Crovderg, and by Fiachra Ó Floinn.

1245. Fiachra, the son of David Ó Floinn, Chief of Síol Maelruain, died.

1263. An army was led by Mac William Burke against Felim O'Conor and his son. He reached Roscommon, and the Sil Murray fled before him into the north of Connaught; and the English had no preys to seize upon on that occasion. Donough Ó Floinn and Teige, his son, attacked their army, and killed one hundred of them, noble and plebeian, with Aitin Russell and his son, the five sons of Cu Connaught O'Conor, and others. The army then returned to their homes in sorrow.

1271. Hugh O'Conor, son of the coarb of St. Coman, was killed at Muine-inghine-Chrechain, by Thomas Butler. Donnell Ó Floinn was slain on the same day, by the son of Robin Lawless, at the upper end of Sruthair.

1284. Simon de Exeter was slain by Brien Ó Floinn and the two sons of O'Flanagan, Dermot and Melaghlin; in consequence of which war and dissensions arose in Connaught. After this the English committed great depredations; but they restored the whole of the spoils to the family of Trinity Island and the monks of the abbey of Boyle.

1284. Dunmore was burned by Fiachra Ó Floinn.

1289. Fiachra Ó Floinn, Chief of Síol Maelruain, the most hospitable and expert at arms of all the chiefs of Connaught, went to form an alliance with the English by marriage, but was treacherously slain by the son of Richard Finn Burke, Mac William, and Mac Feorais.

1300. John Prendergast was slain by the son of Fiachra Ó Floinn.

1300. Seoinin Oge Mac Maurice was slain by Conor Ó Floinn, with many others along with him.

1307. Conor, son of Fiachra Ó Floinn, the most hospitable and valiant youth of his tribe, died.

1331. Thomas, the son of Cú Ciarraighe Ó Floinn, died.

1368. Fiachra Ó Floinn, heir to Síol Maelruain, the best man of his tribe in his time, died; and his wife died as well.

1469. Ó Floinn, Lord of Síol Maelruain, and his brother, were slain by Melaghlin Ó Floinn, who afterwards assumed the lordship.

== Sources ==
- Medieval Ireland: Territorial, Political and Economic Divisions, Paul MacCotter, Four Courts Press, 2008, pp. 134–135. ISBN 978-1-84682-098-4
