= R444 road (Ireland) =

Road in Ireland

R444 road
- Bóthar R444
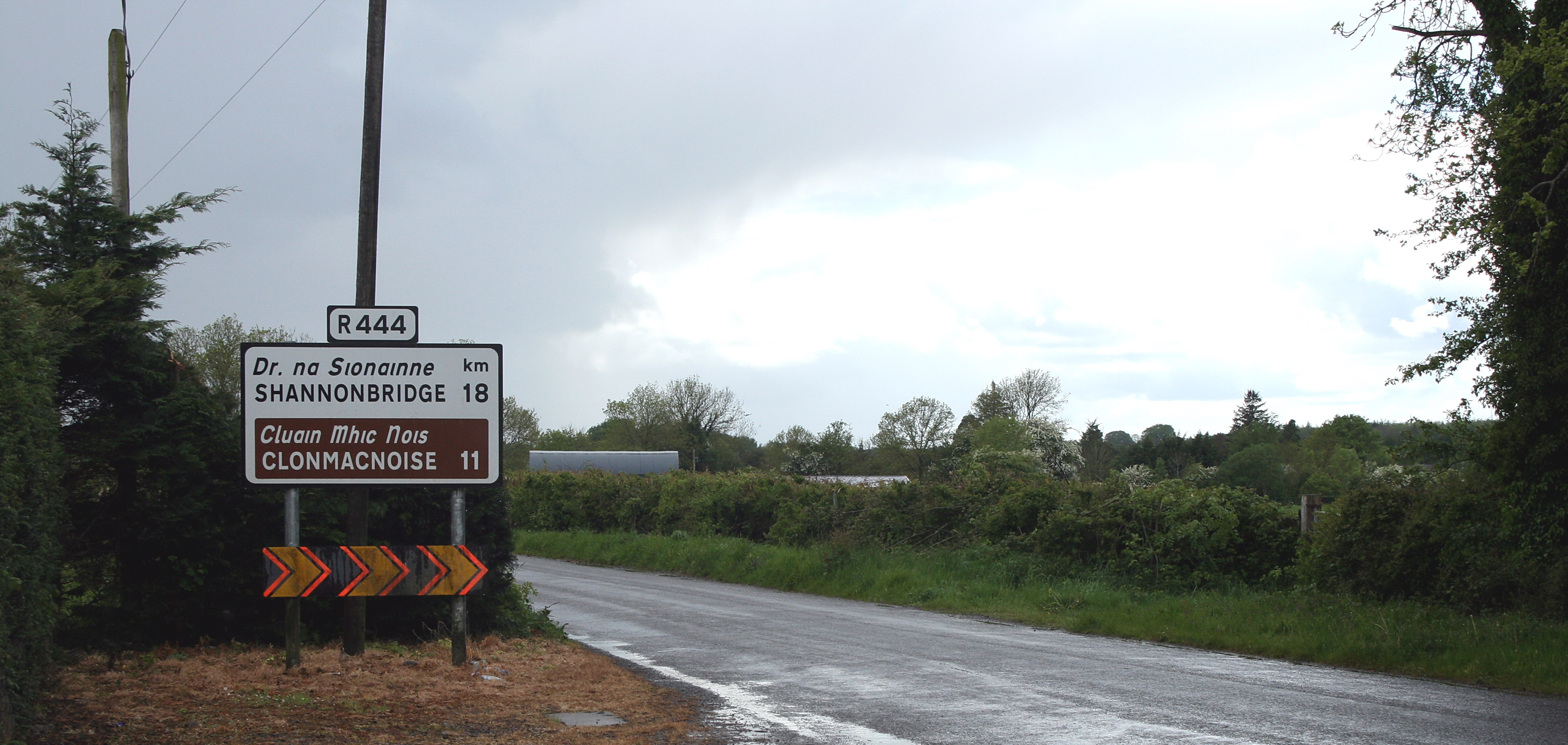
- R444 looking west at Doon

Route information
- Length: 27 km (17 mi)

Location
- Country: Ireland
- Primary destinations: County Offaly; Shannonbridge – Start at junction with R357; Clonmacnoise; Doon – (N62); County Westmeath; Cross the Athlone to Portarlington railway line; Cross the River Boor; Terminates at the R446 near Farnagh, 3 km west of Moate.

Highway system
- Roads in Ireland; Motorways; Primary; Secondary; Regional

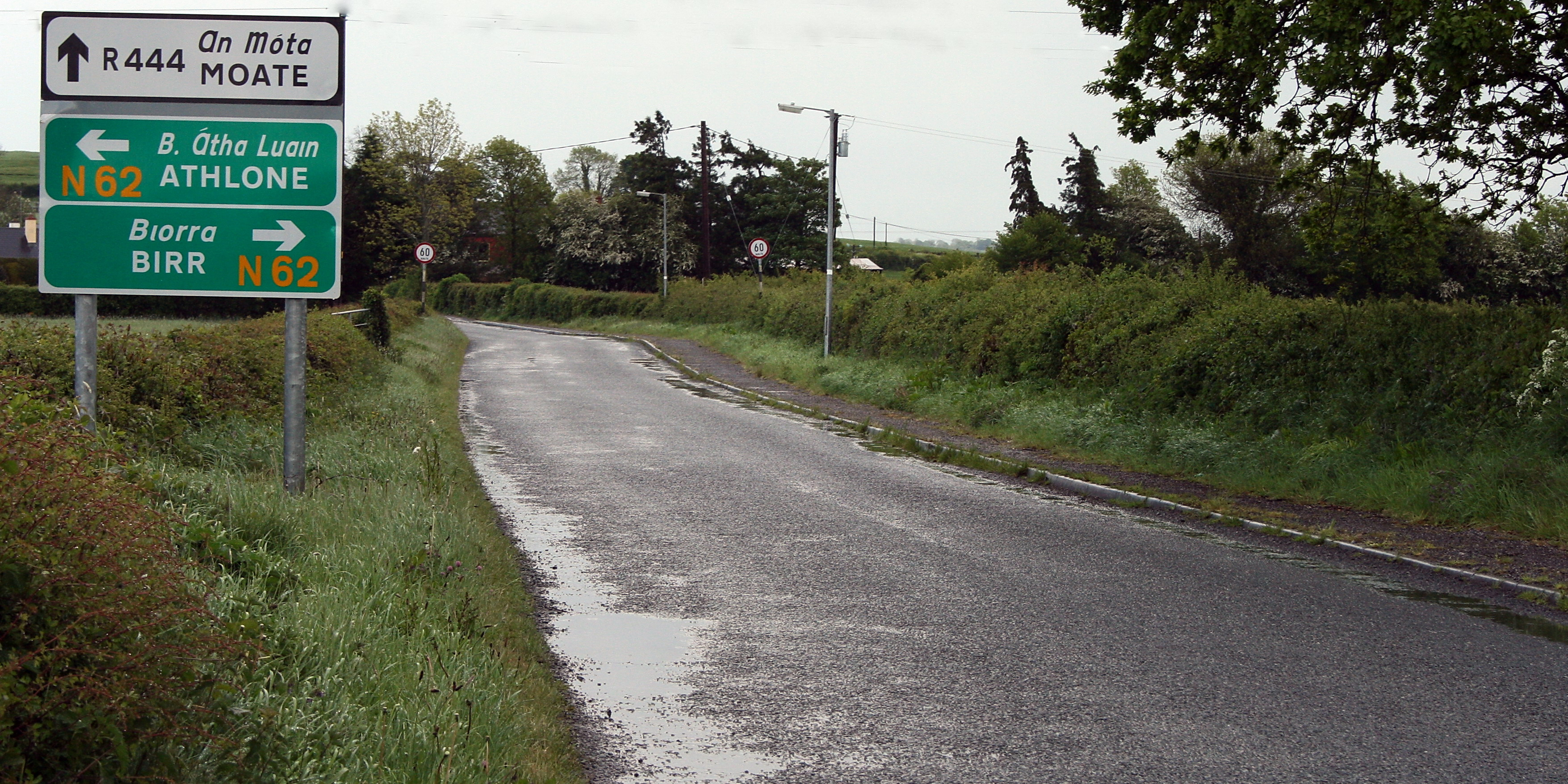
R444 at Doon Cross Roads; approaching from the west

The R444 road is a regional road in Ireland linking R357 at Shannonbridge, County Offaly with the R446 at Farnagh three kilometers west of Moate in County Westmeath. The road is 27 km (17 mi) long.

== See also ==
- Roads in Ireland
- National primary road
- National secondary road
