= Newbridge, County Galway =

Village in County Galway, Ireland

Coordinates: 53°30′30″N 8°25′46″W

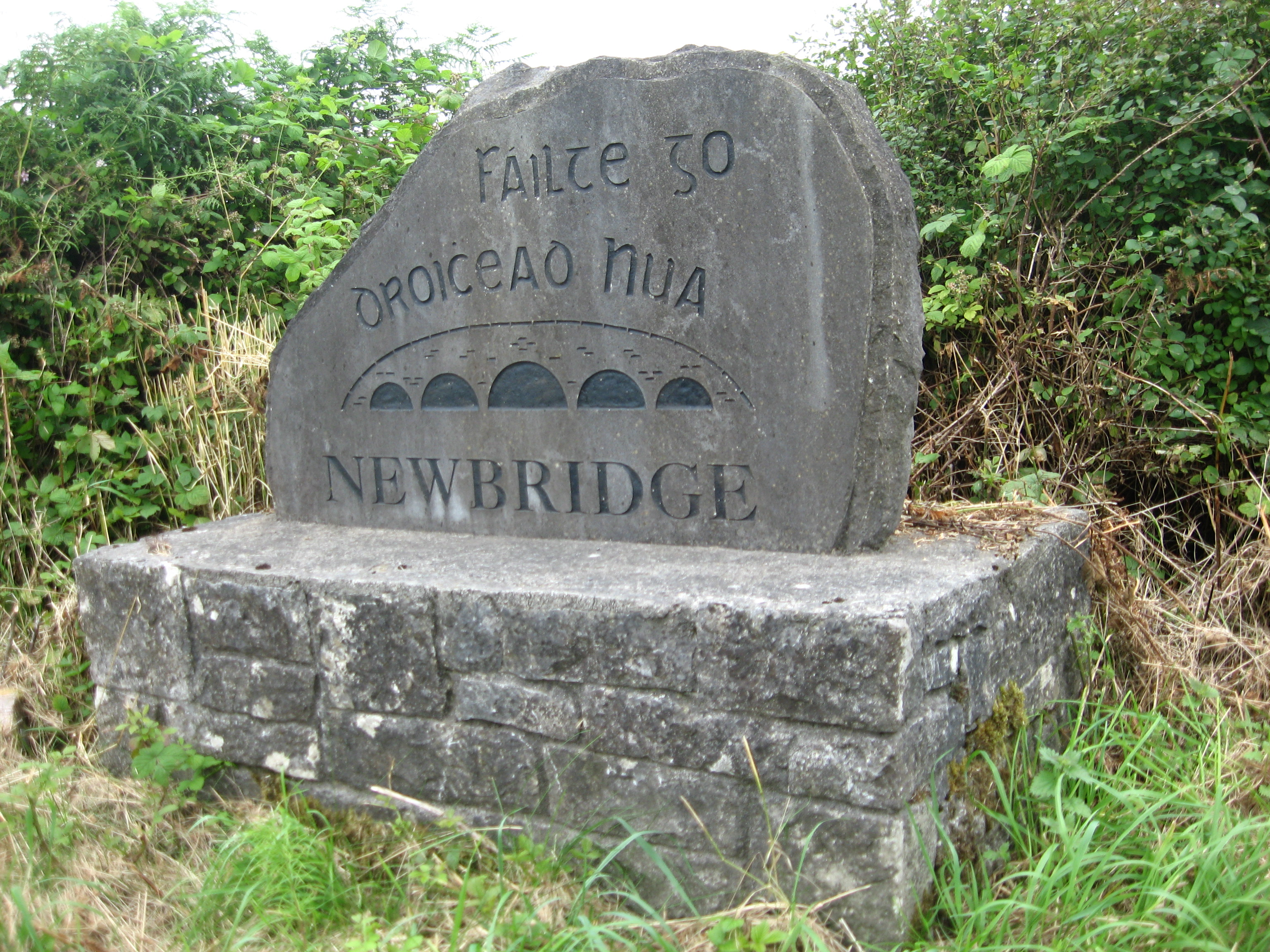
Stone marker on the N63 as you enter the town of Newbridge

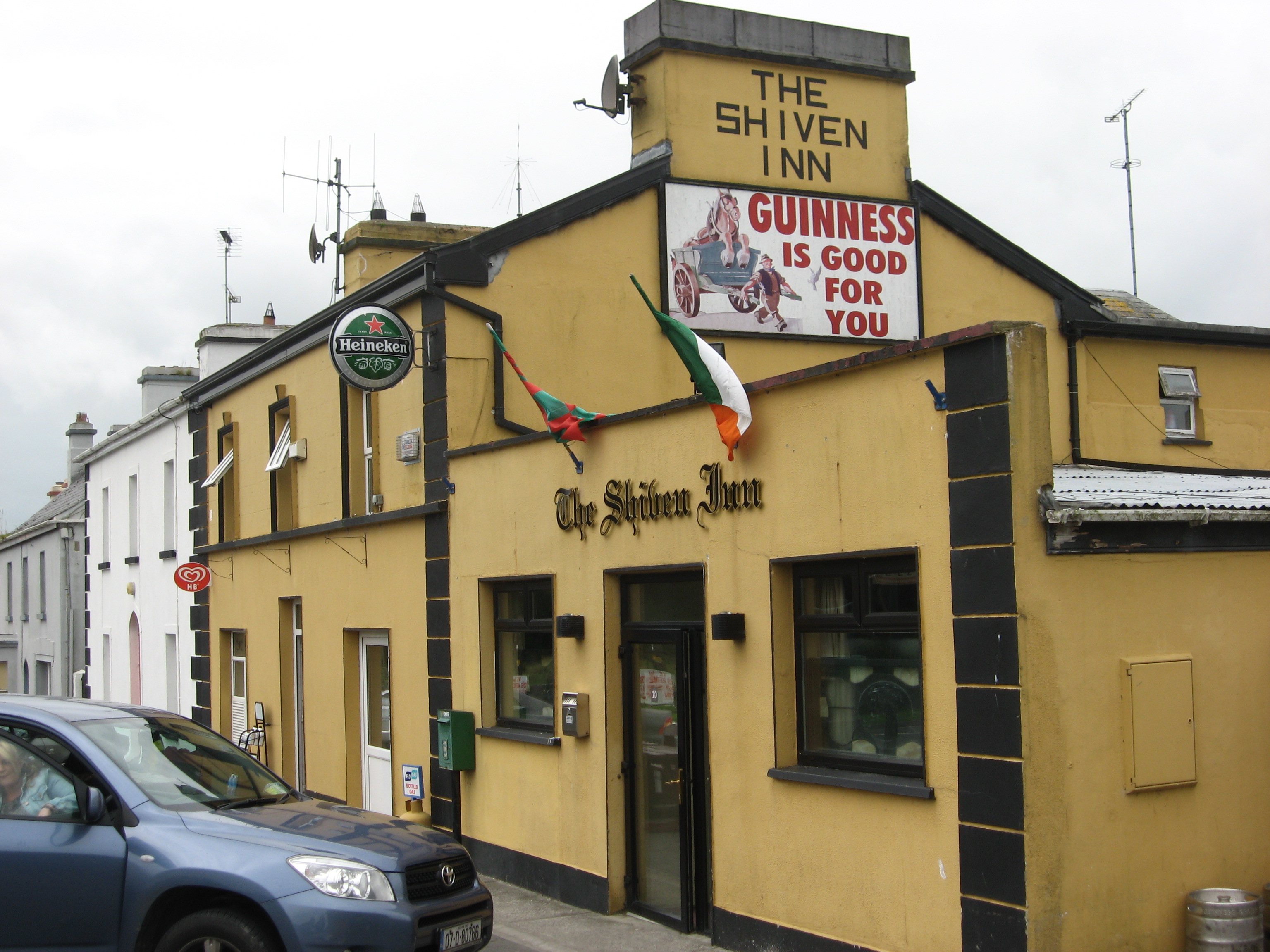
The Shiven Inn, next to a general store

Newbridge is a small rural village in County Galway, Ireland. It is on the N63 road which runs between Galway city and Longford town. By road, the village is 55 km from Galway city and 25 km from Roscommon town.

The village has had various names in Irish such as An Droichead Nua (meaning "new bridge") as used officially, but there are also Gort an Iomaire and Cruffan. The English name Newbridge comes from the village's bridge over the Shiven River.

== See also ==
- List of towns and villages in Ireland
