= Edenderry Power Station =

Biomass power station in County Offaly, Ireland

- Country: Ireland
- Location: Edenderry
- Coordinates: 53°17′26.5″N 07°5′12.9″W
- Status: Operational
- Commission date: December 2000
- Owner: BnM

Thermal power station
- Primary fuel: Biomass

Power generation
- Nameplate capacity: 120 MWe

Edenderry Power Station is a large biomass-fired power station at the Cushaling river near Edenderry, County Offaly, Ireland. The station is capable of generating up to 120 MWe of power. It has been owned by BnM since 2006 and is part of the Powergen Division, having been purchased from E.ON in December 2005.

The station was formerly peat-fired. Trials of co-fuelling the plant with biomass commenced in 2007 and were successful. As of 2020, the plant was co-fired with about 62% biomass (delivered by around 60 heavy goods vehicles per day), of which 336,000 energy tonnes (or 80%) was Irish. The station had a target of 100% biomass by 2023, which was achieved. The ash is sent by rail and deposited at the adjacent Cloncreen bog near Clonbullogue. In 2021 the plant was still burning peat from stocks but was not allowed to cut more.

The station ceased using peat as fuel at the end of 2023. It was Ireland's last operating peat-fired power station; the completion of its switch to biomass fuel marked the end of peat-fired electricity generation in Ireland.

== See also ==
- List of largest power stations in the world
- List of power stations in the Republic of Ireland
