= Shannonbridge =

Village in County Offaly, Ireland

Shannonbridge Irish: Droichead na Sionainne
- Village
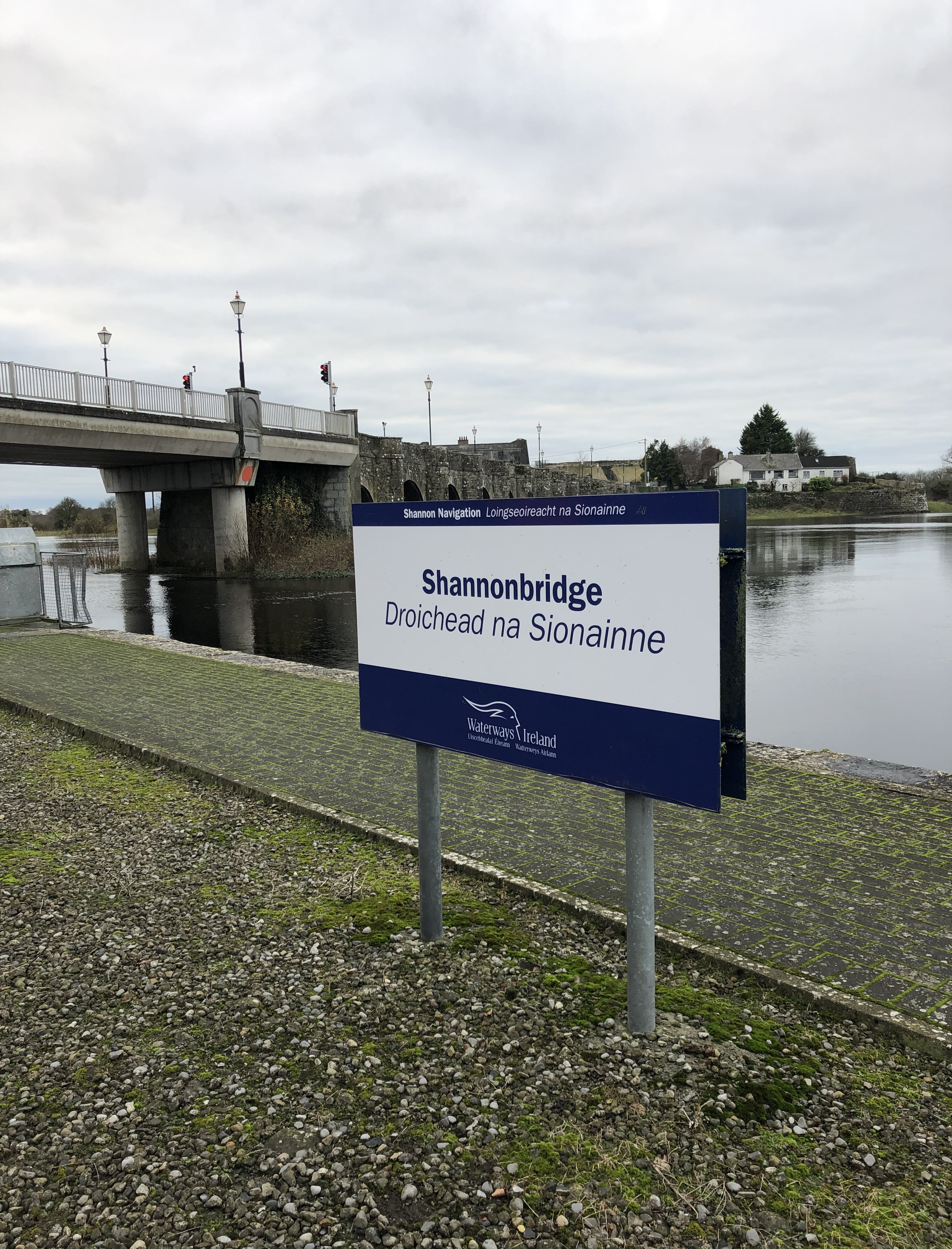
- Motto: Esto Fideles - The Faithful
- Location in Ireland
- Coordinates: 53°16′44″N 8°02′49″W
- Country: Ireland
- Province: Leinster
- County: Offaly
- Elevation: 38 m (125 ft)

Population (2016)
  - Total: 175
- Time zone: UTC+0 (WET)
  - Summer (DST): UTC-1 (IST (WEST))
- Irish Grid Reference: M969253

Shannonbridge (Irish: Droichead na Sionainne) is a village located on the River Shannon, at the junction of the R444 and R357 regional roads in County Offaly, Ireland. It lies within the townland of Raghra (Irish: Reachra), at the borders of counties Offaly, Galway, and Roscommon, with the majority of the population living east of the bridge in County Offaly. As of the 2016 census, the village had a population of 175. There are two housing estates within the village. Its location along Ireland's largest river and its proximity to Clonmacnoise have contributed to tourism being a key contributor to the local economy. The village is flanked by a Special Area of Conservation – the Shannon Callows. The physical environment consists of the River Shannon, callows, boglands and the Esker Riada (a major routeway in the 18th century). The village has one of the oldest bridges still in use over the River Shannon, completed in 1757.

The monastic settlement of Clonmacnoise is approximately 7 km (4.3 mi) upriver.

== History ==
Shannonbridge gets its name from the bridge connecting County Offaly and County Roscommon. Rachra is generally considered the old name for Shannonbridge, but 'Shannonbridge' was adopted after the building of the bridge in 1757. The military may have initially constructed a village, the 'first Shannonbridge', in the vicinity of Temple Duff graveyard just south of the power station.

Shannonbridge was fortified by the British in the Napoleonic era. Some of the fortifications, including a fort that now houses a restaurant, are still visible today on the west bank of the river.

At Curleys Island between Shannonbridge and Clonmacnoise, there is a legendary ford of Snámh Dá Éan ("swim two birds"). It was here that a proselytising Saint Patrick ostensibly crossed the Shannon into Connacht, and much later the Anglo-Normans considered the ford important enough to be guarded by one of their campaign forts. Accordingly, they constructed the great Motte of Clonburren on the Roscommon side of the river, within sight of an even then declining early Christian nunnery.

In 2019, a group of Romanian nuns established an orthodox monastery, The Life-Giving Spring - Ard Ciaran, in Shannonbridge. The property Ard Ciaran was formerly a prayer and retreat centre run by the Ursuline order.

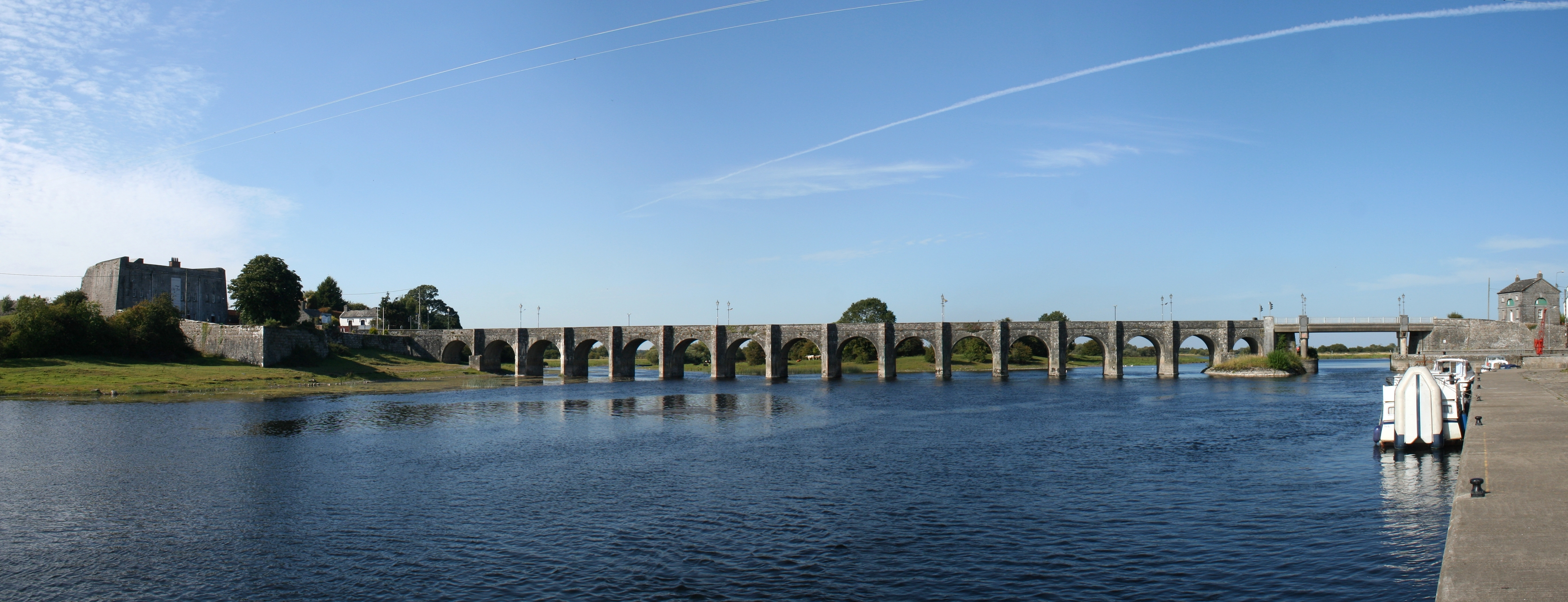
Fort and bridge

== Economy ==
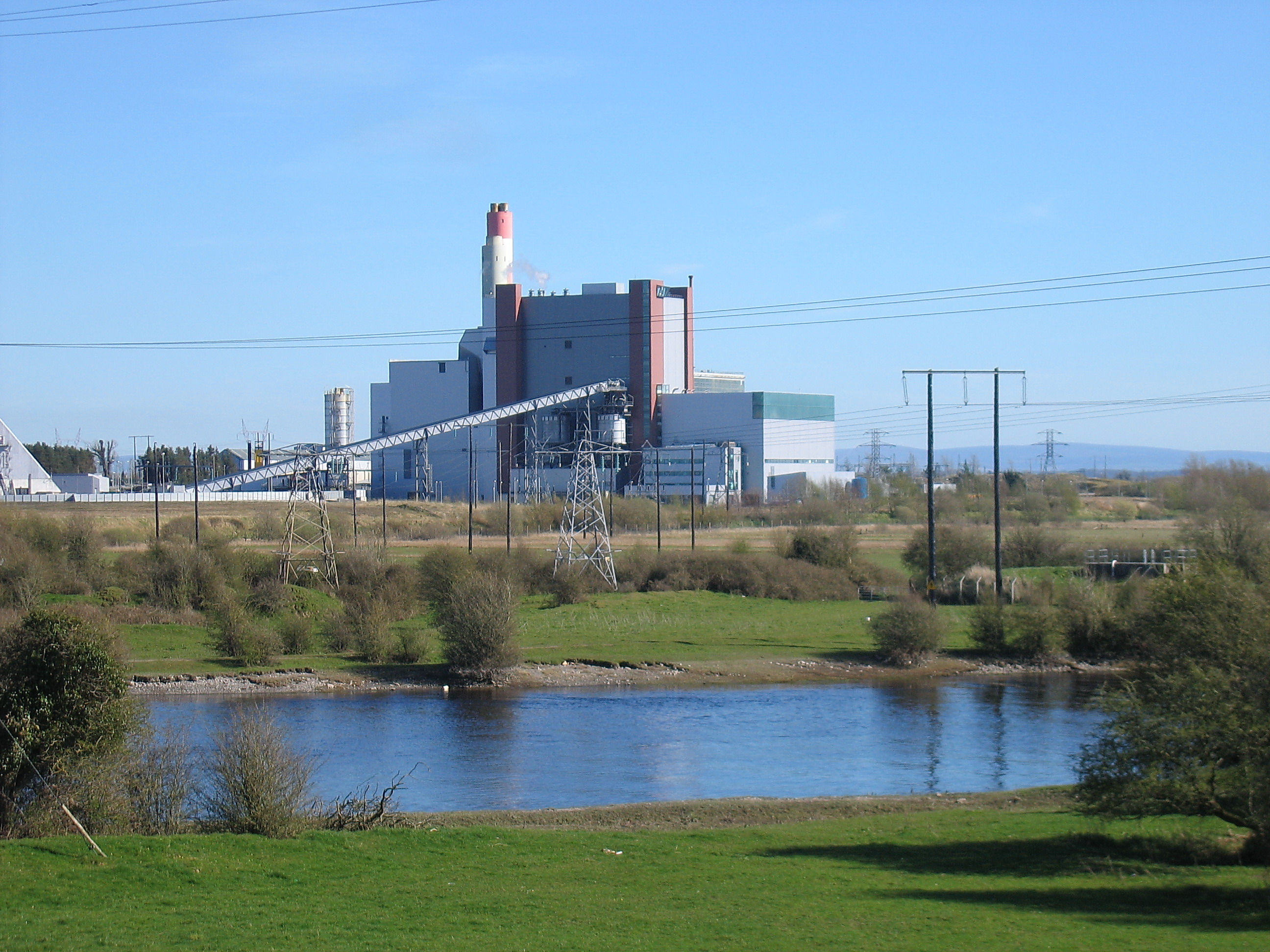
ESB Power Station

Historically, the main employers in Shannonbridge have included the Electricity Supply Board (whose West Offaly Power Station operated from 1965 to 2020) and Bord na Móna (harvesting peat used in the station). Tourism also supports employment in the area, and there is a farming community present. The nearby towns of Ballinasloe, County Galway and Athlone, County Westmeath serve as district centres for the village.

The Electricity Supply Board's peat-fired power station, the West Offaly Power Station, had a capacity of 135 megawatts and was located about 1 km (0.62 mi) downriver from Shannnonbridge. The peat was supplied from the Blackwater Bog peatlands, managed by Bord na Móna. The power station closed in 2020. The Clonmacnoise and West Offaly Railway (a narrow gauge railway) was principally used to transport the peat to the power station, and also provides passenger tours of the peat lands for visitors.

Local services include two shops, a post office, three pubs, a service restaurant, and a butcher.

== Tourism ==
Tourists come to Shannonbridge by cruiser on the River Shannon, a short distance from the main street. A tourist office is located at the west end of the main street. The monastic settlement of Clonmacnoise is 7 km (4.3 mi) upriver and attracts approximately 100,000 visitors per annum.

Shannonbridge tennis court was built in 1988 with funds from the national lottery on land leased from the Electricity Supply Board. The court is located at the eastern end of the village adjacent to St. Kierans Park.

Shannonbridge is a destination for anglers, and the River Shannon has stocks of bream, rudd, rudd/bream hybrids, tench, perch, pike as well as stocks of trout, eel and salmon. Angling also takes place in the rivers Suck and Brosna and in the Grand Canal. Lough Ree is 30 km (19 mi) from the town.

The Clonmacnoise and West Offaly Railway Bog Tour is a 45-minute train journey giving a guided 9 km (5.6 mi) tour across a working environment, a cutaway area of preserved peatlands. About 32,000 visitors go on the tour per annum.

The Shannonbridge Pottery is nearby.

In August 2009, Ireland's first ever Climate Camp was held in the village, bringing activists from all over the country to a field next to the West Offaly Power Station. For a week they protested against the extraction and burning of peat in the station, on the grounds that it releases large quantities of carbon dioxide and methane into the atmosphere. They held workshops on the themes of sustainability and climate change.

In June 2026, €10m funding for a 27-kilometre Athlone - Shannonbridge section of the Dublin-Galway greenway was announced by Transport Infrastructure Ireland.

== Flora and fauna ==
The River Shannon, which flows through the area, provides a habitat for a number of species of local flora, include types of algae, reeds and grasses. Local fauna include brown hares, foxes, mink and frogs. There are butterflies, dragonflies, beetles and in the Shannon; mussels, snails and leeches. Bird varieties on the Shannon include swans (Bewick's, mute and whooper), moorhens, swallows, terns, ducks and corncrakes.

Climatologists, archaeologists and biologists value the area's peatlands and the peat archives in the bogs for research purposes.

The Callows is a stretch of the River Shannon at Shannonbridge that has a shallow gradient which results in seasonal flooding when heavy rain occurs. This has resulted in the formation of callows areas (wet grassland areas) which are rich in flora and fauna and a conservation area which is designated as an (NHA) Natural Heritage Area, (SAC) Special Area of Conservation and (SPA) Special Protection Area. The corn crake, which is rare and is protected nationally, is seen in the Callows area. Ducks, gulls, swans, and breeding waders including the northern lapwing, common redshank, Eurasian curlew and common sandpiper are also recorded within the area.

== Sport ==
Shannonbridge Gaelic Athletic Association club have won one Offaly Senior Football Championship title, which they achieved in 1996 by defeating Tullamore. They also won the Offaly Intermediate Championship in 2019, and progressed onto the Leinster semi-final where they were defeated by Rathgarogue-Cushinstown. As of 2025, the club was playing Gaelic football at the Junior A grade.

== Notable people ==
- George Brent, actor

== See also ==
- List of towns and villages in Ireland
