= Ballinlough, County Roscommon =

Village in County Roscommon, Ireland

Ballinlough Baile an Locha
- Village
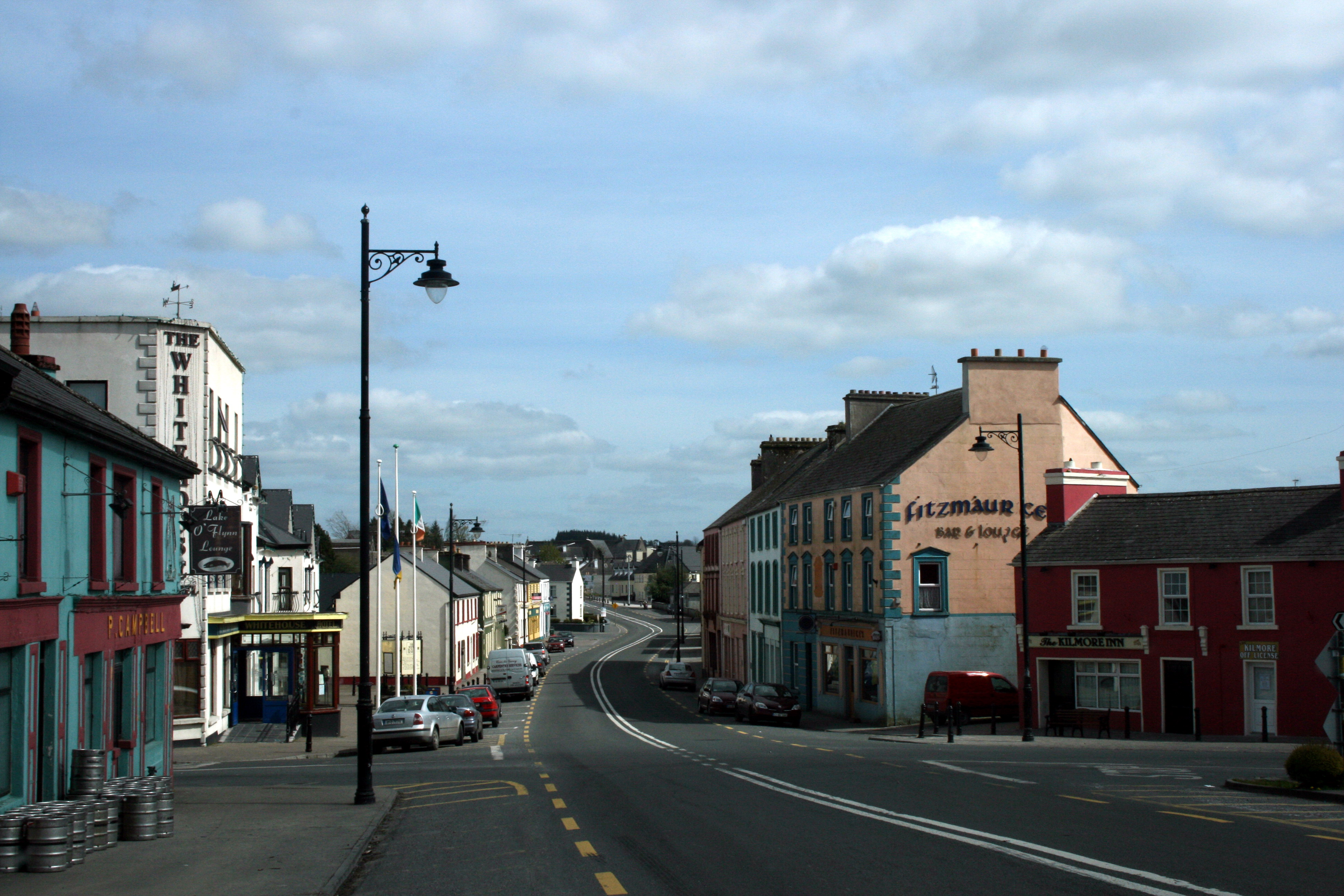
- Ballinlough Main Street (N60 road)

- Location in Ireland
- Coordinates: 53°44′30″N 8°38′01″W
- Country: Ireland
- Province: Connacht
- County: County Roscommon

Population (2022)
  - Total: 343
- Time zone: UTC+0 (WET)
  - Summer (DST): UTC-1 (IST (WEST))

Ballinlough (/ˌbælɪnˈlɒx/ BAL-in-LOKH; Irish: Baile an Locha, meaning 'town of the lake') is a village in western County Roscommon, Ireland. The N60 national secondary road passes through it. The village is between Ballyhaunis and Castlerea on the Roscommon to Castlebar road. As of the 2022 census, Ballinlough had a population of 343 people.

Lake O'Flynn, which lies north of the village, is notable for brown trout fishing. The lake is also the source of the River Suck (which is a tributary of the River Shannon). In 2013, a bog walk was constructed around Lake O'Flynn, together with an outdoor gym.

== Notable people ==
- Andreas O'Reilly von Ballinlough (1742–1832), a military commander in the service of the Austrian Empire, was born in the village.

== See also ==
- List of towns and villages in Ireland
