= West Offaly Power Station =

Peat-fired power station in Ireland

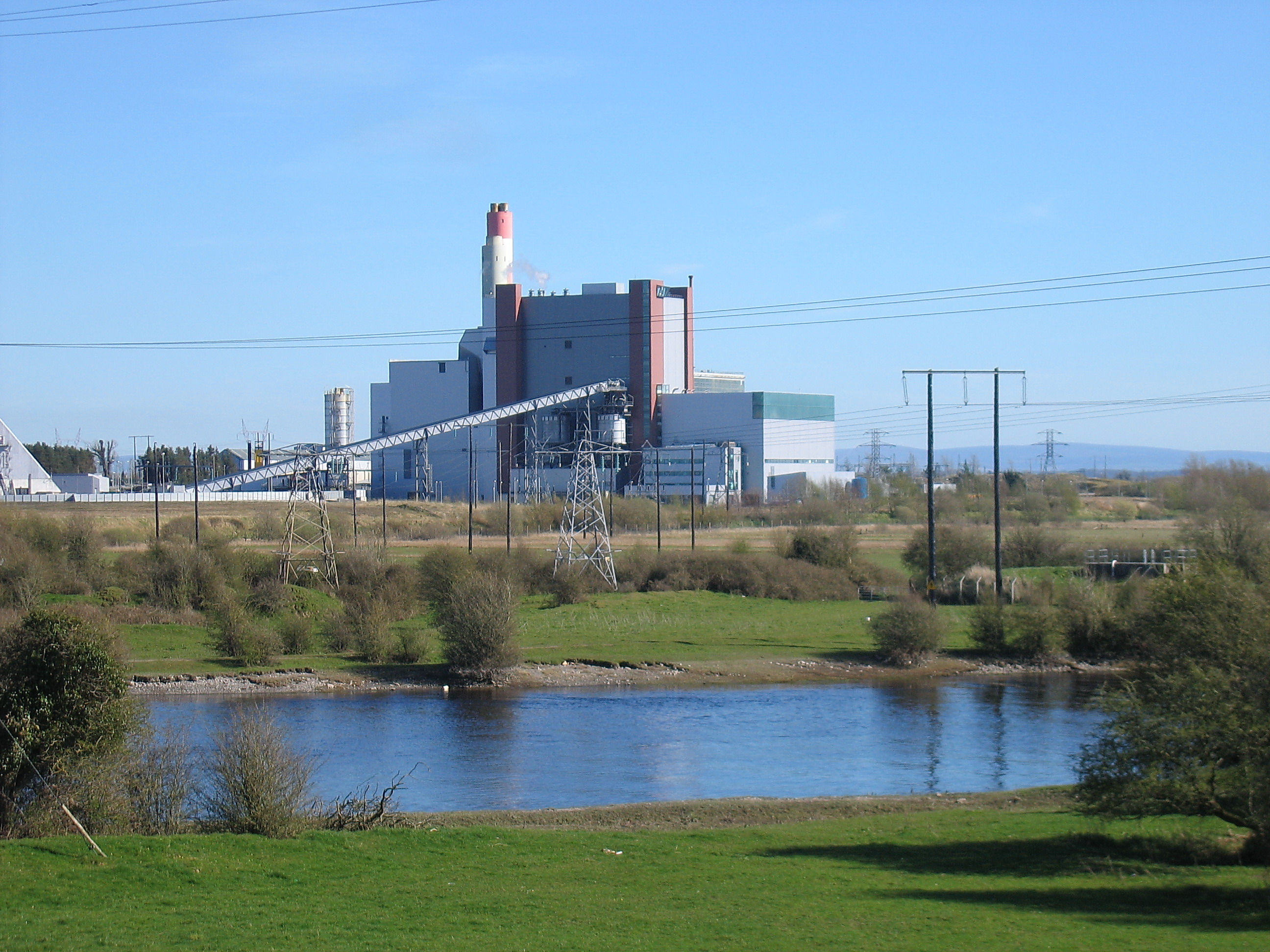
- Country: Ireland
- Location: Shannonbridge
- Coordinates: 53°16′22″N 08°02′20″W
- Status: Closed 2020
- Commission date: July 2004
- Owner: Electricity Supply Board

Thermal power station
- Primary fuel: Peat

Power generation
- Nameplate capacity: 150 MWe

External links
- Commons: Related media on Commons

The West Offaly Power Station was a large peat-fired 135 MW power station in Shannonbridge from 2005 to 2020, in Ireland. The station was capable of generating up to 153 MWe of power, thus ranking as the largest peat-fired power station in the country. The power station was constructed adjacent to (and as a replacement of) the ageing 125 MWe peat Shannonbridge Power Station, which operated in stages from 1965 to 2003, and demolished in 2005.

The station directly employed approximately forty full-time staff with additional contract and part-time staff. The station further supports employment in the Semi State Bord na Móna which supplied West Offaly with milled peat from the surrounding bogs.

As part of its social employment mandate, the station received public service obligation support until 2019. On 11 December 2020 the station ceased all power production after permission to continue burning peat was refused. Although local groups and leaders hoped that the plant would be converted to alternative use, the plant's owner has announced that the plant will be demolished and the site remediated to comply with the power plant licenses.

A hybrid 97 MW / 170 MWh synchronous condenser / battery storage power station grid stability plant started construction at the site in 2022, expected to complete by 2024 a cost of €130 million.

== See also ==
- List of largest power stations in the world
- List of power stations in the Republic of Ireland
