= Dysart, County Roscommon =

Dysart An Díseart
- Village
- Location in Ireland
- Coordinates: 53°27′51″N 8°12′56″W
- Country: Ireland
- Province: Connacht
- County: County Roscommon
- Time zone: UTC+0 (WET)
  - Summer (DST): UTC-1 (IST (WEST))

Dysart (Irish: An Díseart) is a village in County Roscommon, Ireland. It lies 20 km (12 mi) from the centre of Athlone, on the R363 regional road. Located at the crossroads of the R363 and the R357, the village was formerly known as 'Thomas Street'. Dysart is beside a civil parish of the same name.

Dysart village has two public houses, a grocery store, community centre, football pitch (home of Dysart F.C.), and a Roman Catholic graveyard and church (St. Patrick's).

== Natural Resources ==
Correspondence exists from George Ensor, architect of the Roscommon Sessions house/ Courthouse / Market house, in Roscommon Town, recommending the use of best Irish oak timber in 1762 from Dysart.

== Sport ==
The local association football (soccer) club is Dysart FC. Formed in June 1971, the club purchased its present property in 1972. The first match played by the club was a challenge 8-a-side game against Four Roads, which ended 2 all. A parish league (7-a-side) was played in 1971 with 3 teams: Dysart (village), Ballintleva and Feevagh. Feevagh came out on top with 3 wins and 1 draw.

== See also ==
- List of towns and villages in Ireland
