= River Suck =

Tributary of the Shannon in central and western Ireland

Coordinates: 53°16′N 8°03′W

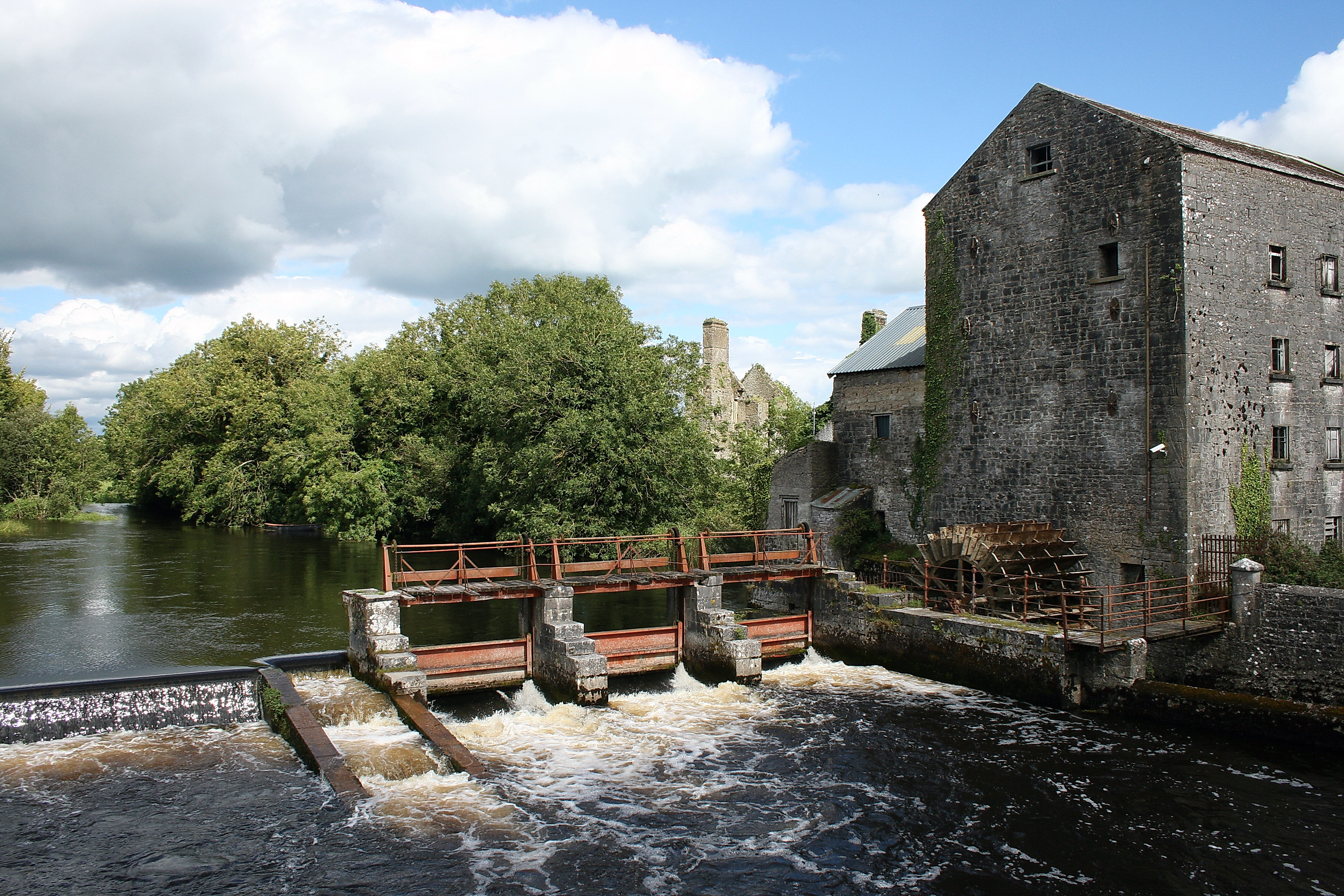
- River Suck, Athleague
- Etymology: Irish suca, possibly from words meaning "amber" or "juice, sap"
- Native name: An tSuca (Irish)

Location
- Country: Ireland

Physical characteristics
- Source
  - location: Lough O'Flynn, County Roscommon
  - elevation: 72 metres (236 ft)
- Mouth: River Shannon
  - location: Shannonbridge, County Offaly
- Length: 133 km (83 mi)
- Basin size: 1,600 km^{2} (620 sq mi)
- Discharge
  - average: 22.2 m^{3}/s (780 cu ft/s)

Basin features
- Tributaries
  - right: Smalghrean River, Linbaun River, Shiven River

The River Suck (Irish: An tSuca [ənˠ ˈt̪ˠʊkə]) is a river within the Shannon River Basin in Ireland, 133 km (82.5 mi) in length, and is the 7th longest river in Ireland. It is the main tributary of the River Shannon. It meets the Shannon a kilometre south of the village of Shannonbridge.

== Name ==
The river's name is derived from the Irish suca. The Placenames Branch of the government Department of Culture, Communications and Sport observed that "the root word is wrapped in a web of uncertainty and lost in the mists of time". Edmund Hogan's Onomasticon Goedelicum (1910) records the spellings suġ (sugh), suggesting connections to Old Irish súg ("juice, sap").

== Course ==
The River Suck drains an area of 1,599 square kilometres (617 sq mi). It forms much of the border between County Roscommon and County Galway, flowing along the western side of County Roscommon. Together with the Shannon on the east, it creates the long narrow form of southern County Roscommon.

The river rises in hills on the border of County Mayo and County Roscommon, and passes from Lough O'Flynn in a general south and south-easterly direction. The actual source of the River Suck is in the townland of Coolnafarna in Co. Mayo, just 325 metres from the border with Co. Roscommon. It flows generally eastwards from its source and on into Lough O Flynn in Co. Roscommon about 3 km away. Settlements along the river include Athleague, Ballinasloe, Ballyforan, Ballymoe, Castlerea, Glinsk, and Tulrush, and it flows into the River Shannon a kilometre south of the village of Shannonbridge.

== Geography ==
The water is clean and unpolluted and the river flows through unspoilt countryside with moorland, water meadows and pastureland. Some stretches are fast-flowing while others are slow and meandering. There are abundant bream, rudd and tench in some parts, and perch and pike are also plentiful. To prevent flooding at Ballinasloe, a weir was erected in 1885 immediately above the four-arch bridge, with draw-doors which can be raised when there is an approaching flood.

== Bridges ==
From the point where the River Suck exits Lough O Flynn in Co. Roscommon, to where it meets the River Shannon just south of the Co. Offaly village of Shannonbridge, a total of 27 bridges cross over the river. 2 of these are private, 2 carry mainline rail lines and the remaining 23 are public roads of varying significance from narrow single lane local roads to national Motorways

== Suck Valley Way ==
The Suck Valley Way is a long-distance trail. It is a 105-kilometre (65-mile) long circular route that begins and ends in Castlerea, County Roscommon. It is designated as a National Waymarked Trail by the National Trails Office of the Irish Sports Council and is managed by Roscommon County Council, Roscommon Integrated Development Company and the Suck Valley Committee.

== See also ==
- Rivers of Ireland
