= Trunk roads in Ireland =

Major roads in Ireland

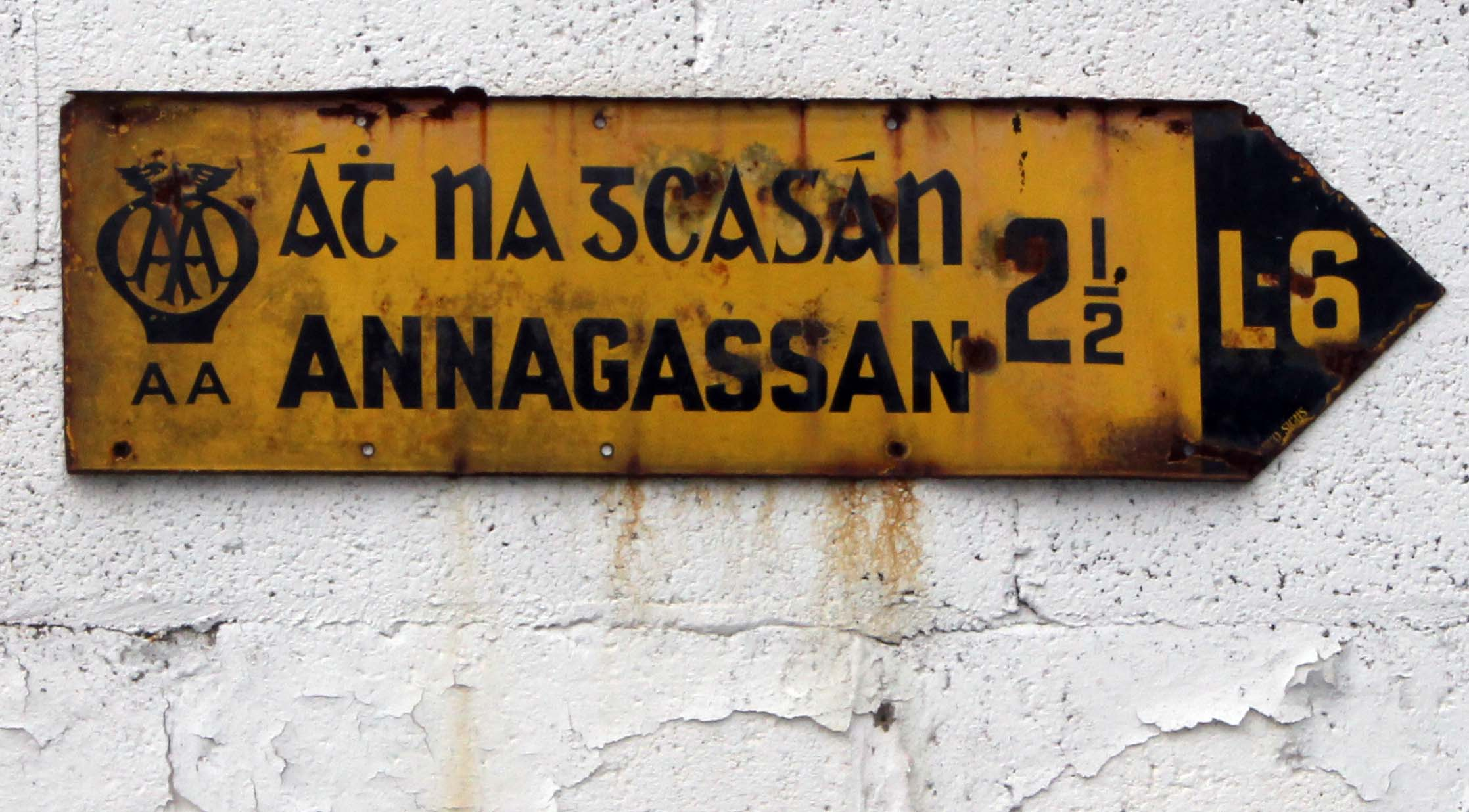
AA sign near Annagassan, indicating Link Road L6

A trunk road was a road in the Republic of Ireland of the highest classification between 1926 and 1977. The lower classifaction of main road was termed a link road. Trunk and link roads were identified by numbers prefixed with the letter T or L respectively; lesser roads had no such identifiers. In 1977 the classification was changed to national primary and secondary, regional, and local roads. Typically, each segment previously classified as trunk or link respectively became national or regional, but the numbering was done on a new basis.

== History ==
The UK's Ministry of Transport Act 1919 said that the British Minister of Transport "may, after consultation with the Roads Committee ... and the local authorities affected, classify roads in such manner as he thinks fit". The Irish Free State's Minister for Local Government and Public Health inherited this power under the Ministers and Secretaries Act 1924. The Local Government Act 1925 classified each road as a "main road", "county road", or "urban road", depending on whether they were to be funded by ratepayers of the whole county, the rural area, or the urban area respectively; only the minister could designate main roads. In December 1925 the minister made a "Main Roads Order" for each administrative county in consultation with its local authorities, designating certain roads as main roads, each numbered as a "Trunk" or "Link" road. A 1926 order provided that road signs should display "the route letter and number" assigned by the minister, and that 'the expression "Main Road" [in the 1919 act] included a road classified ... as a "Trunk" or "Link" Road.' A 1964 parliamentary answer described the Main Road Order process:

Subsequently, in the period 1925–26, a further classification of roads was made pursuant to the Local Government Act, 1925, into main, county and urban roads, for the purpose of apportioning statutory responsibility for construction and maintenance, and for determining the chargeability of roads expenses for the purposes of annual estimates. The 1925 Act classification, like the 1919 Act classification, was also made after consultation with the local authorities, and the roads which were declared to be main roads were the trunk and link roads of the 1919 Act classification together with some additional roads decided upon after the consultation which I have mentioned.

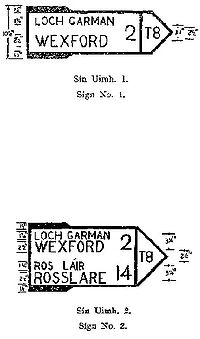
T8 Examples from the Traffic Signs Regulations 1956

Even though legal authority for the erection of directional signposts was given to local councils, the Automobile Association of Ireland began an extensive road signposting scheme in 1938 which included comprehensive signposting of routes from Belfast, Cork and Dublin. Evidence that the Trunk Road and Link Road classification and numbering system had been well established by the 1950s is found in the Traffic Signs Regulations, 1956 which contains examples of several directional signs. The first and second examples show the T8 as the route to Wexford and Rosslare. In addition, Esso road-maps of Ireland from the 1950s show the Trunk and Link road network.

== Supersession ==
This current system of road classification and numbering has its origins in the late 1960s: the Minister for Local Government, Kevin Boland, announced on 23 July 1969 that a national road network would be formed, to be planned and funded by central rather than local government. The Local Government (Roads and Motorways) Act 1974 allowed for designation of roads as motorways or national roads. National roads were first designated on 1 June 1977. Twenty-five National Primary routes (N1-N25) and thirty-three National Secondary routes (N51-N83) were initially designated. Sections of national roads upgraded to motorway status would use letter M instead of N in the identifier (beginning in 1983).

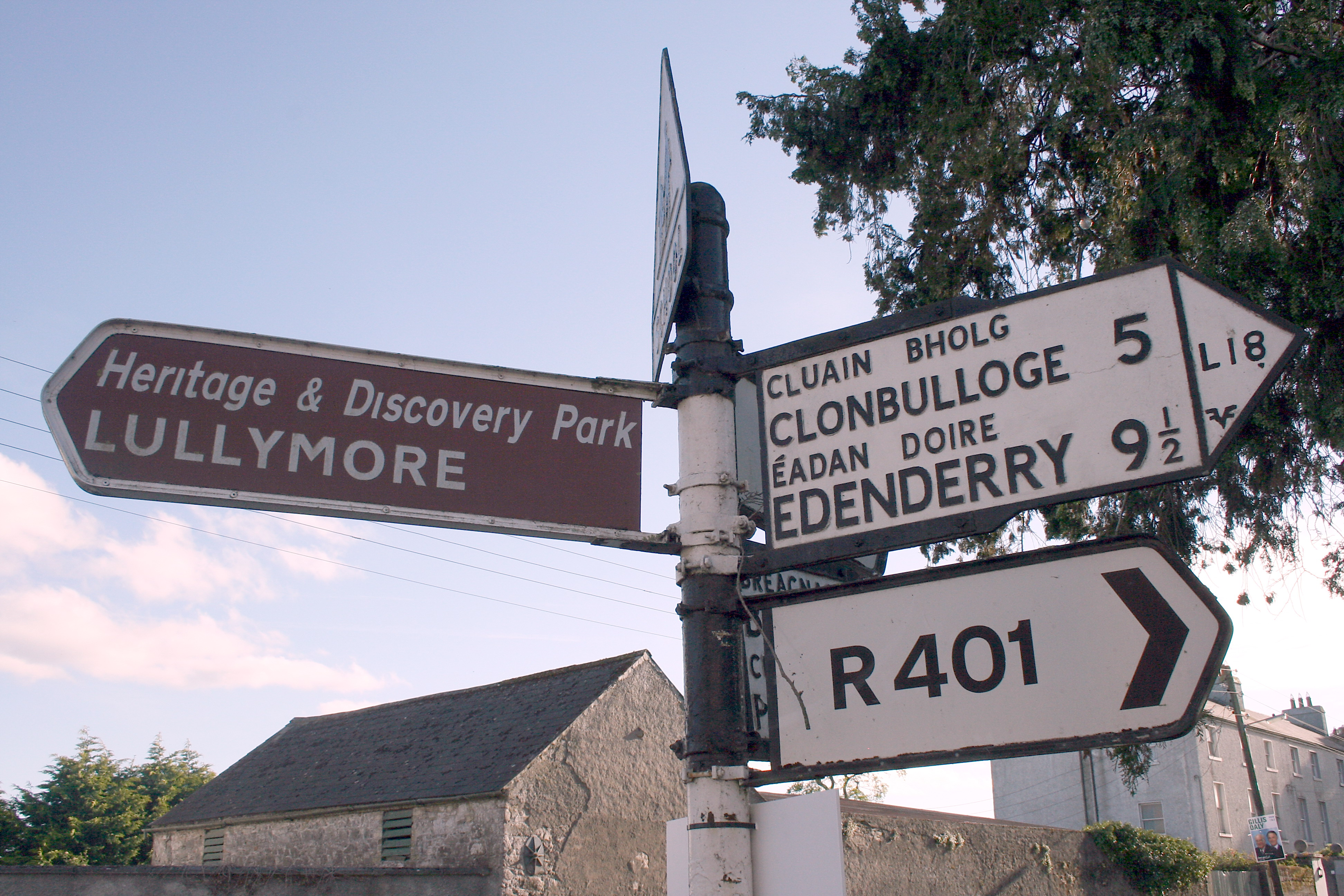
Signpost with old sign for former L18 link road and new sign for current R401 regional road

The changeover to the new system was gradual: a route planning map of Ireland from the late 1970s (or early 1980s) shows a mixture of Trunk Road, Link Road and National route numbers.

== Trunk Roads and Link Roads ==
Major roads within the Republic of Ireland were marked with "T" for Trunk Road, less important roads were marked with "L" for Link Road.

Trunk Roads connected major towns to each other while passing through smaller towns and villages.

Several trunk routes were designed to connect towns in different regions of Ireland (for example, the T41 from Enfield to Kilrush, via Tullamore, Portumna, Scariff and Ennis) while other roads (for example, the T66 Ring of Kerry route) were designated scenic routes.

Link Roads connected smaller towns and villages to each other and to the Trunk Road network.

There were eighty-four Trunk Roads in total, numbered from T1 to T77 consecutively (plus T4a, T11a, T12a, T21a, T28a, T50a and T72a). Roads with the 'a' suffix branched off roads with the same number. For example, the T4a branched off the T4 at Ballinasloe in County Galway and the T12a branched off the T12 to serve Cóbh in County Cork.

The first nine Trunk Roads (T1, T2, T3, T4, T4a, T5, T6, T7, T8) radiated out from Dublin (with the T8 branching off the T7 at Enniscorthy) and followed an anti-clockwise pattern. This pattern was similar to the existing anti-clockwise pattern which the National routes and motorways radiating out of Dublin now follow. The pattern was interrupted by the T35 (Dublin-Cavan-Donegal route) which came between the T2 and the T3 and the T42 (now N81), T43 and T44 which came between the T5 (T6) and the T7 routes.

Unlike the present system, where each road (whether N- or R-) has a unique number, under the Trunk and Link Road system, Link Roads were numbered separately beginning with L1. These L (for Link Road) numbers are not related to the current Lxxxx numbers for Local Roads.

Confusingly, some old road signs still show the former (now obsolete) Trunk and Link road-numbers.

Trunk Roads were broadly equivalent to the present National routes, and Link Roads to the present Regional roads. Most of the National Primary and National Secondary routes had been Trunk Roads and generally they followed the routes of these Trunk Roads, albeit with a different numbering system. However, some National Primary and Secondary routes also incorporated Link Roads and unclassified roads into their routes. After the introduction of the new road numbering system, some Trunk Roads (either in whole or in part) were downgraded to Regional roads, effectively 'de-trunked'Trunk road#De-trunking: Ireland.

A notable feature of the former system was multiplexing (or concurrency), where a section of road was designated by two or more route numbers. Examples of multiplexes include the T7/T12 multiplex between New Ross and Waterford, the T6/T13 multiplex between Cahir and Kilheffernan (east of Clonmel), the T28/T36 multiplex between Newcastlewest and Abbeyfeale and the short T19/T21 multiplex between Thurles and Toor. The road between Cavan, Butlersbridge, Cloverhill and the border with Northern Ireland (near Wattle Bridge in County Fermanagh) was a triple multiplex of the T10, T15 and T35 routes.

Three routes (T15, T22, T35) had sections which were disconnected from the rest of the route by roads which crossed through Northern Ireland. These routes lost their Trunk Road designations through Northern Ireland, regaining them on exiting Northern Ireland. The T15 crossed the border several times between Cavan and Clones, alternating between the T15 and the A3 designations.

== List of former trunk roads in Ireland ==
Multiplex sections, where two or more trunk roads ran concurrent with each other, are shown in italics. Sections through Northern Ireland, with A and B road designations, are shown in bold.

Road	From	To	Itinerary	Replaced by
T1	Dublin	(Belfast)	Dublin – Swords – Balbriggan – Drogheda – Dunleer – Dundalk – **border – (to Belfast via A1)**	N1
T2	Dublin	(Derry)	Dublin – Ashbourne – Slane – Collon – Ardee – Carrickmacross – Castleblayney – Monaghan – Emyvale – **border – (to Derry via A5)**	N2
T3	Dublin	Sligo	Dublin – Lucan – Leixlip – Maynooth – Kilcock – Enfield – Kinnegad – Mullingar – Edgeworthstown – Longford – Roosky – Dromod – Carrick-on-Shannon – Boyle – Collooney – Sligo	N4
T4	(Dublin)	Galway	(Dublin) – Kinnegad – Rochfortbridge – Kilbeggan – Moate – Athlone – Ballinasloe (multiplex with T31) – Kilconnell – Kiltullagh – Athenry – Derrydonnell – Oranmore – Galway	N6; R348
T4a	Ballinasloe	Loughrea	(Dublin) – Ballinasloe – Garbally – Aughrim – Kilreekill – Kilmeen – Loughrea (multiplex with T21)	N6
T5	Dublin	Limerick	Dublin – Naas – Newbridge – Kildare – Monasterevin – Portlaoise – Mountrath – Borris-in-Ossory – Roscrea – Nenagh – Lisnagry – Limerick	N7
T6	(Dublin)	Cork	(Dublin) – Naas – Kilcullen – Athy – Castlecomer – Henebry's Cross – Kilkenny (multiplex with T14) – Callan – Ninemilehouse – Kilheffernan – Clonmel – Cahir (multiplex with T13) – Kilbehenny – Mitchelstown – Moorepark – Fermoy – Rathcormac – Watergrasshill – Glanmire – Cork	N9; N78; N77; N76; N24; N8
T7	Dublin	Waterford	Dublin – Stillorgan – nr St. Colmcille's Hospital, Loughlinstown – nr Shankill – Fassaroe – Newtownmountkennedy – Rathnew – Rathdrum – Avoca – Woodenbridge – Arklow – Gorey – Ferns – Enniscorthy – New Ross – Waterford (multiplex with T12)	N11; R752; R747; N79 (now N30); N25
T8	Enniscorthy	Rosslare	(Dublin) – Enniscorthy – Oylgate – Ferrycarrig Bridge – Wexford – Blackhorse – Killinick – Rosslare	N11; N25
T9	Dundalk	Cahir	Dundalk – Ardee – Kells – Delvin – Mullingar – Kilbeggan – Tullamore – Ballard – Cadamstown – Kinnitty – Boheraphuca – Ballybritt – Roscrea – Templemore – Thurles – Holycross – Cashel – Cahir – (to Cork via T6)	N52; R421; N62; R660; N8
T10	(Enniskillen)	Mullingar	('from Enniskillen) – Wattle Bridge – border – Cloverhill – Butlersbridge – Cavan (multiplex with T35 & T15) – Ballinagh (or Bellananagh) – nr Kilcogy (multiplex with T15) – Finnea – Castlepollard – Mullingar	N54; N3; N55; R394
T11	Cork	(Sligo)	Cork – Mallow – Buttevant – Charleville – Croom – Patrickswell – Limerick – Bunratty – Hurler's Cross – Newmarket on Fergus – Ennis – Crusheen – Gort – Coole – Lydican – Drumharsna – Owenbristy – Kiltiernan – Kilcolgan – Clarinbridge – Oranmore – Galway (multiplex with T4) – Claregalway – Tuam – Dunmore – Cloonfad – Ballyhaunis – Tawnyinah – Charlestown – Tubbercurry – Collooney – joined T3 to Sligo	N20; N18; N6; N17
T11a	Dunmore	Ballymoe	Dunmore – Williamstown – Ballymoe	R360
T12	Cork	Wexford	Cork – Dunkettle – Carrigtwohill – Midleton – Castlemartyr – Killeagh – Youghal – Dungarvan – Joulterspark – Lemybrien – Kilmeaden – Waterford – New Ross (multiplex with T7) – Wexford	N25
T12a	(Cork)	Cobh	(Cork) – Cobh Cross – Cobh	R624
T13	Limerick	Waterford	Limerick – Tipperary – Bansha – Cahir – Clonmel – Kilheffernan (multiplex with T6) – Carrick on Suir – Mooncoin – Waterford	N24
T14	Waterford	Tullamore	Waterford – Mullinavat – Ballyhale – Knocktopher – Stoneyford – Kilkenny – Henebry's Cross (multiplex with T6) – Ballyragget – Ballinakill – Abbeyleix – Portlaoise – Mountmellick – Tullamore	N9; N10; N77; R432; N8; N80
T15	(Galway)	(Monaghan)	(Galway) – Roouanmore – Lackagh – Turloughmore – Moylough – Mountbellew – Athleague – Roscommon – Lanesborough – Longford – Ballinalee – Granard – nr Kilcogy – Ballinagh (or Bellananagh) – Cavan (multiplex with T10) – Butlersbridge – Leggykelly (multiplex with T10-T35) – **border – A3 – County Fermanagh – border** – re-entered County Cavan – **border (Derrynure) – A3 – County Fermanagh – border** – entered County Monaghan – Clones – Smithborough – Monaghan – **border (Tamlat) – (to Armagh via A3)**	N63; R194; N55; N3; N54; N12
T16	(Enniscorthy)	Portlaoise	(Enniscorthy) – Ballynahallin – Bunclody – Ballon – Carlow – Ballickmoyler – Arless – Stradbally – Portlaoise	N80
T17	Sligo	(Enniskillen)	Sligo – Manorhamilton – Blacklion – **border – (to Enniskillen and Belfast via A4 and, later, NI's M1)**	N16
T18	Sligo	(Derry)	Sligo- Grange – Drumcliffe – Bundoran – Ballyshannon – Donegal – Ballybofey – Stranorlar – Killygordon – Castlefin – Cloghfin – **border – Clady – (to Strabane and Derry via B85 and A5)**	N15
T19	Kilkenny	(Limerick)	Kilkenny – Freshford – Urlingford – Turnpike (multiplex with T36) – Thurles – Toor (multiplex with T21) – Ballycahill – Rosmult – Milestone – Inch – Anglesey Bridge – Rear Cros – Newport – Lisnagry – (to Limerick via T5)	R693; N8; N75; R498; R503
T20	Kilkenny	New Ross	Kilkenny – Bennettsbridge – Thomastown – Inistioge – New Ross	R700
T21	Thurles	(Galway)	Thurles – Toor (multiplex with T19) – Borrisoleigh – Nenagh – Borrisokane – Portumna – Killimor – Ballydavid – Killmeen – Loughrea (multiplex with T4a) – Craughwell – Derrydonnell (to Galway via T4)	R498; N52; N65; N6
T21a	Borrisokane	Moneygall	Borrisokane – Cloughjordan – Moneygall	R490
T22	Dundalk	Castleblayney	Dundalk – **border – A37 – Cullaville – border** – re-entered County Monaghan – Castleblayney	N53
T23	Dundalk	(Armagh)	Dundalk – Kilcurry – **border – (to Newtownhamilton, Keady and Armagh via A29)**	R177
T24	Dundalk	Granard	Dundalk – Chanonrock – Carrickmacross – Corvally – Shercock – Bailieborough – Virginia – Ballyjamesduff – Ballymachugh – nr Finnea – Granard	R178; R194
T25	(Drogheda)	Collon	(Drogheda) – Collon	R168
T26	Drogheda	Kinnegad	Drogheda – Slane – Navan – Bective Abbey – Trim – Kinnegad	N51; R161
T27	(Youghal)	Clonmel	(Youghal) – Kinsalebeg – Clashmore – Modeligo – Halfwayhouse Inn – Ballymacarbry – Clonmel	R671
T28	(Limerick)	Tralee	(Limerick) – Patrickswell – Adare – Rathkeale – Newcastle West – Abbeyfeale (multiplex with T36) – Castleisland – Caherbreagh – Tralee	N21
T28a	Castleisland	Farranfore	Castleisland – Farranfore	N23
T29	(Tralee)	Cork	(Tralee) – Caherbreagh – Farranfore – Killarney – Ballyvourney – Macroom – Coachford – Carrigrohane – Cork	N22; R618
T30	(Dungarvan)	(Killarney)	(Dungarvan) – Joulterspark – Cappoquin – nr Lismore – Ballyduff – Fermoy – Castletownroche – Mallow – Rathmore – Clasheen – (to Killarney via T29)	N72; R666
T31	Portumna	Granard	Portumna – Ballinasloe – Athlone (multiplex with T4) – Ballymahon – Edgeworthstown – Granard	R355; N6; N55
T32	Roscrea	(Athlone)	Roscrea – Birr – Cloghan – Ferbane – Fardrum – (to Athlone via T4)	N62
T33	Birr	Borrisokane	Birr – Ballingarry – Borrisokane	N52
T34	Athlone	Boyle	Athlone – Roscommon – Tulsk – Boyle	N61
T35	Dublin	(Donegal)	Dublin – Clonee – Dunshaughlin – Navan – Kells – Virginia – Cavan – Butlersbridge – Cloverhill – **border – (multiplex with T10-T15)** – **A3 – Wattle Bridge – A34 – Newtownbutler – Lisnaskea – Tamlaght – A4 – Enniskillen – A32 – Irvinestown – A35 – Kesh – border** – Pettigo – Laghey – (to Donegal via T18)	N3; N54; R232
T36	Abbeyleix	Listowel	Abbeyleix – Durrow – Cullahill – Urlingford – Turnpike (multiplex with T19) – Horse and Jockey – Cashel – Golden – Tipperary – Emly – Kilmallock – Charleville – Drumcolliher – Feohanagh – Newcastle West – Abbeyfeale (multiplex with T28) – Duagh – Listowel	N8; N74; R515; R522; N21; R555
T37	Cashel	(Kilkenny)	Cashel – Dually – Ballinure – Laffansbridge – Killenaule – Ballingarry – Ballyline – Ballymack – (to Kilkenny via T6)	R691
T38	Mitchelstown	Mallow	Mitchelstown – Kildorrery – Mallow	N73
T39	Roscommon	Louisburgh	Roscommon – Ballymoe – Castlerea – Ballyhaunis – Claremorris – Balla – Castlebar – Westport – Louisburgh	N60; N5; R335
T40	(Sligo)	Galway	(Sligo) – Ballysadare – Beltra – Dromore West – Easky – Rathlee – Kilglass – Enniscrone – Corraun – Ballina – Foxford – Strade – Bellavary – Castlebar – Ballintubber – Partry – Ballinrobe – Kilmaine – Shrule – Headford – Galway	N59; R297; N57 (now N26); N58; N5; N84
T41	Enfield	Kilrush	(Dublin) – Enfield – Edenderry – Daingean – Ballinagar – Clonmore – Cappincur – Tullamore – Screggan – Blue Ball – Kilcormac – Birr – Riverstown – Pike – Portland – Portumna – Power's Cross – Gorteeny – Mountshannon – Scariff – Tuamgraney – Bodyke – Moymore – Spancil Hill – Ennis – Darragh – Caherea – Lissycasey – Knockalough – Kilrush	R402; N52; R489; N65; R352; N68
T42	Dublin	Clash	Dublin – Templeogue – Tallaght – Brittas – Blessington – Baltinglass – Rathvilly – Tullow – Clash – (joined T16)	N81
T43	Dublin	(Bray)	Dublin – Milltown – Windy Arbour – Dundrum – Sandyford – Stepaside – Kiltiernan – Enniskerry – Fassaroe – (Bray)	R117
T44	Dublin	(Shankill)	Dublin – Ballsbridge – Merrion – Booterstown – Blackrock – Monkstown – Dún Laoghaire – Dalkey – Killiney – (Shankill) – (to Bray via T7)	R118; N31; R119
T45	Clones	(Newry)	Clones – Killeevan – Newbliss – Ballybay – Castleblayney – Milltown – **border – (to Newtownhamilton and Newry via A25)**	R183; R182
T46	Carrickmacross	Ballybay	Carrickmacross – Ballybay	R180
T47	Tullamore	(Athlone)	Tullamore – Clara – Moate – (to Athlone via T4)	N80
T48	Durrow	(Borris-in-Ossory)	Durrow – Ballycolla – Aghaboe – Sentry Hill – (to Borris in Ossory and Roscrea via T5)	R434
T49	Cashel	Clonmel	Cashel – Rosegreen – Ballyclerahan – Clonmel	R688
T50	Mitchelstown	(Limerick)	Mitchelstown – Ballylanders – Knocklong – Hospital – Herbertstown (multiplexed with T57) – Caherconlish – Beary's Cross – (to Limerick via T13)	R513
T50a	Kilmallock	(Limerick)	Kilmallock – Bruff – Holy Cross – nr Ballybricken – (to Limerick via T57)	R512
T51	Kilcullen	Kilkenny	(Dublin – Naas) – Kilcullen – Timolin – Moone – Castledermot – Carlow – Leighlinbridge – Paulstown – Kilkenny	N9; N10
T52	(Drumsna)	Belturbet	(Drumsna) – Annaduff – Mohill – Cloone Grange – Carrigallen – Killeshandra – Milltown Abbey – Lisnamaine – Kilconney – Belturbet – Sugarloaf – Gannons Cross – joined T10-T35 multiplex	R201; R200 (now N87); R197
T53	Dromod	Swanlinbar	Dromod – Mohill – Garvagh – Fenagh – Ballinamore – Gortmore – Swanlinbar – **border – (to Enniskillen via A32 and A4)**	R202
T54	Carrick on Shannon	Bundoran	Carrick on Shannon – Leitrim – Drumgorman – Drumshanbo – Tarmon – Drumkeeran – Killarga – Manorhamilton – Glenade – Kinlough – Bundoran	R280
T55	(Carrick on Shannon)	Fenagh	(Carrick on Shannon) – Drumheckil – Keshcarrigan – Fenagh – joined T53	R209
T56	Carrick on Suir	(Kilkenny)	Carrick on Suir – Ballinacluna – (Kilkenny via T6)	R696
T57	Limerick	Emly	Limerick – Ballyneety – nr Ballybricken – Mohane – Herbertstown – Hospital (multiplexed with T50) – Emly (joined T36)	R512; R514; R513; R516
T58	Ballina	Belmullet	Ballina – Crossmolina – Bellacorick – Bangor Erris – Bunnahowen – Belmullet	N59; R313
T59	Stranorlar	(Derry)	Stranorlar – Kilross – Letterkenny – Manorcunningham – Newtown Cunningham – Speenoge – Bridge End – **border – (to Derry via A2)**	N56 (now N13); N13
T60	(Letterkenny)	Lifford	(Letterkenny) – nr Corkey – Lifford – **border – A38 – Strabane – (to Derry and Dublin via A5)**	N14
T61	(Bray)	Rathdrum	(Bray) – Kilmacanogue – Killough – Roundwood – Annamoe – Laragh – Rathdrum	R755
T62	(Dundalk)	(Omeath)	(Dundalk) – Ballymascanlan – The Bush – Carlingford – Omeath – Cornamucklagh – **border – (to Newry via B79)**	R173
T63	Waterford	Dungarvan	Waterford – Tramore – Annestown – Knockmahon – Bunmahon – Stradbally – Dungarvan	R675
T64	Macroom	(Bantry)	Macroom – Kilbarry – Inchigeelagh – Ballingeary – Kealkill – Ballylickey – (to Bantry via T65)	R584
T65	Killarney	Cork	Killarney – Kenmare – Glengarriff – Bantry – Scart – Aghaville – Drimoleague – Dunmanway – Enniskeane – Bandon – Inishannon – Halfway – Cork	N71; R586
T66	Tralee	Kenmare	Tralee – Castlemaine – Killorglin – Glenbeigh – Cahirciveen – Waterville – Caherdaniel – Sneem – Parknasilla – Kenmare (part of Ring of Kerry route)	N70
T67	Killorglin	Killarney	Killorglin – Killarney (part of Ring of Kerry route)	N72
T68	Limerick	Dingle	Limerick – Kildimo – Askeaton – Foynes – Tarbert – Listowel – Tralee – Camp – Annascaul – Dingle	N69; R559 (now N86)
T69	Kilcolgan	Kilrush	Kilcolgan – Kinvara – Ballyvaughan – Lisdoonvarna – Ennistymon – Lahinch – Milltown Malbay – Quilty – Doonbeg – Kilkee – Kilrush	N67
T70	Ennistymon	Ennis	Ennistymon – Ennis	N85
T71	Galway	Bangor Erris	Galway – Moycullen – Oughterard – Maam Cross – Recess – Clifden – Letterfrack – Kylemore Abbey – Leenane – Carrowkennedy – Liscarney – Westport – Newport – Mulrany – Ballycroy – Bangor Erris	N59
T72	Donegal	Letterkenny	Donegal – Inver – Dunkineely – Five Points – Ardara – Kilrean – Glenties – Lettermacaward – Dungloe – Burtonport – Kincasslagh – Crolly – Dore – Bunbeg – Brinlack – Gortahork – Falcarragh – Dunfanaghy – Creeslough – Cashel – Carrigart – Milford – Ramelton – Letterkenny (West Donegal Coastal Route)	N56; R259; R257; R245
T72a	Donegal	Malin More	(Donegal) – Five Points – Killybegs – Kilcar – Glencolumbkille – Malin More	R263
T73	Speenoge	(Derry)	Inishowen Ring: Speenoge – Burnfoot – Fahan – Buncrana – Drumfree – Clonmany – Ballyliffen – Carndonagh – Gleneely – Moville – Whitecastle – Quigley's Point – Muff – **border (Culmore) – (to Derry via A2)**	R238
T74	Letterkenny	(Derry)	(Letterkenny) – Newtown Cunningham – Speenoge – Bridge End – **border – (to Derry via A2)**	N13
T75	(Dungarvan)	(Clonmel)	(Dungarvan) – Ballymacmague South – Halfway House Inn – (to Clonmel via T27)	R672
T76	Borrisoleigh	Templemore	Borrisoleigh – Templemore	R501
T77	Longford	Foxford	Longford – Strokestown – Tulsk – Frenchpark – Ballaghaderreen – Charlestown – Swinford – Foxford	N5; N57 (now N26)

== See also ==
- Roads in Ireland
- Roads in Northern Ireland
- Motorways in the Republic of Ireland
- National primary road
- National secondary road
- History of roads in Ireland
- Road signs in Ireland
- Transport in Ireland
