= R327 road (Ireland) =

Road in Ireland

R327 road
- Bóthar R327
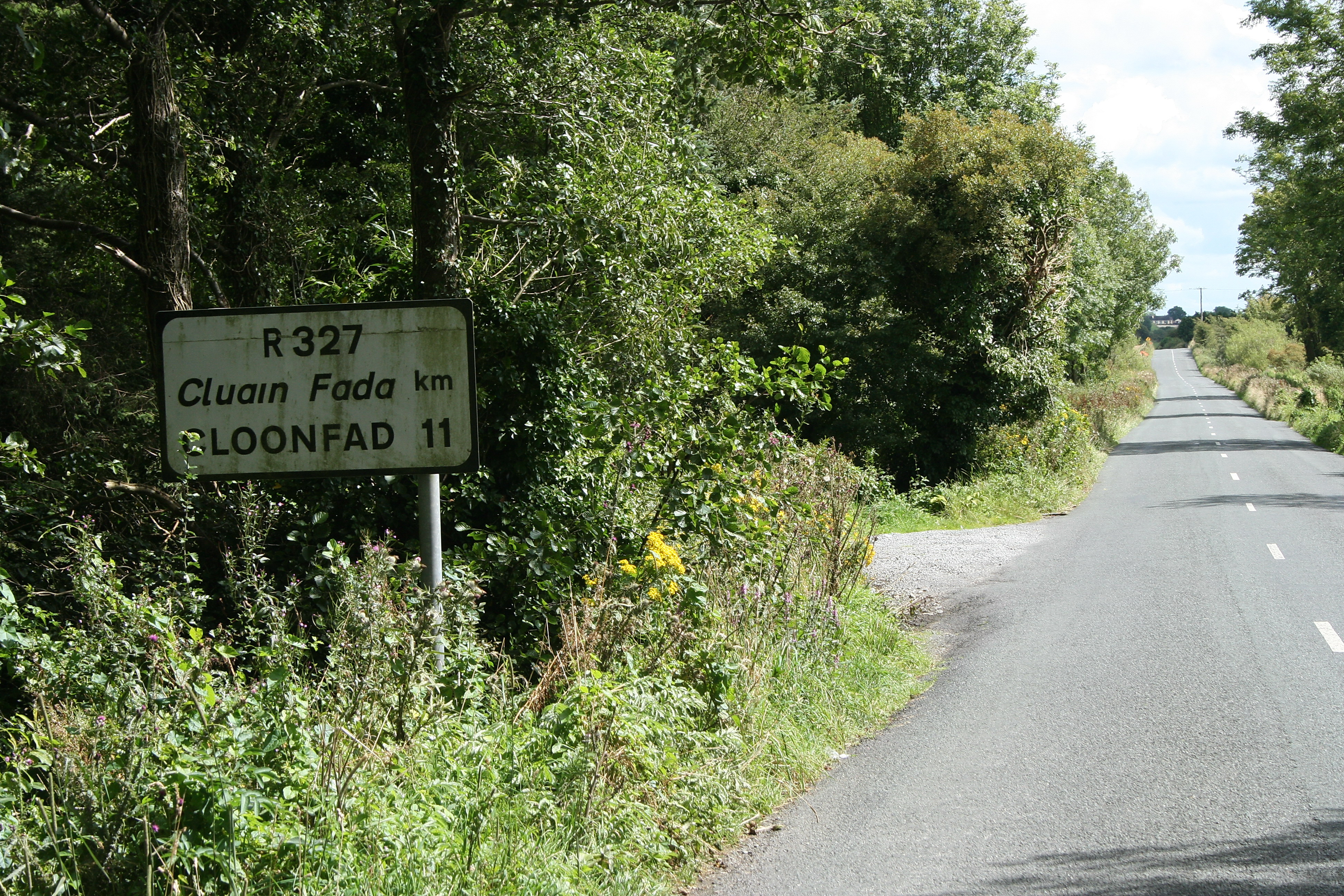
- R327 near Claremorris

Route information
- Length: 24 km (15 mi)

Location
- Country: Ireland
- Primary destinations: County Mayo; Leaves the N60 at Cuilmore, 6 km east of Claremorris; Crosses the River Robe; Tulrahan; Crosses the Dalgan River; County Roscommon; Cloonfad - (N83); County Galway; Terminates at a junction with the R360 near Williamstown

Highway system
- Roads in Ireland; Motorways; Primary; Secondary; Regional

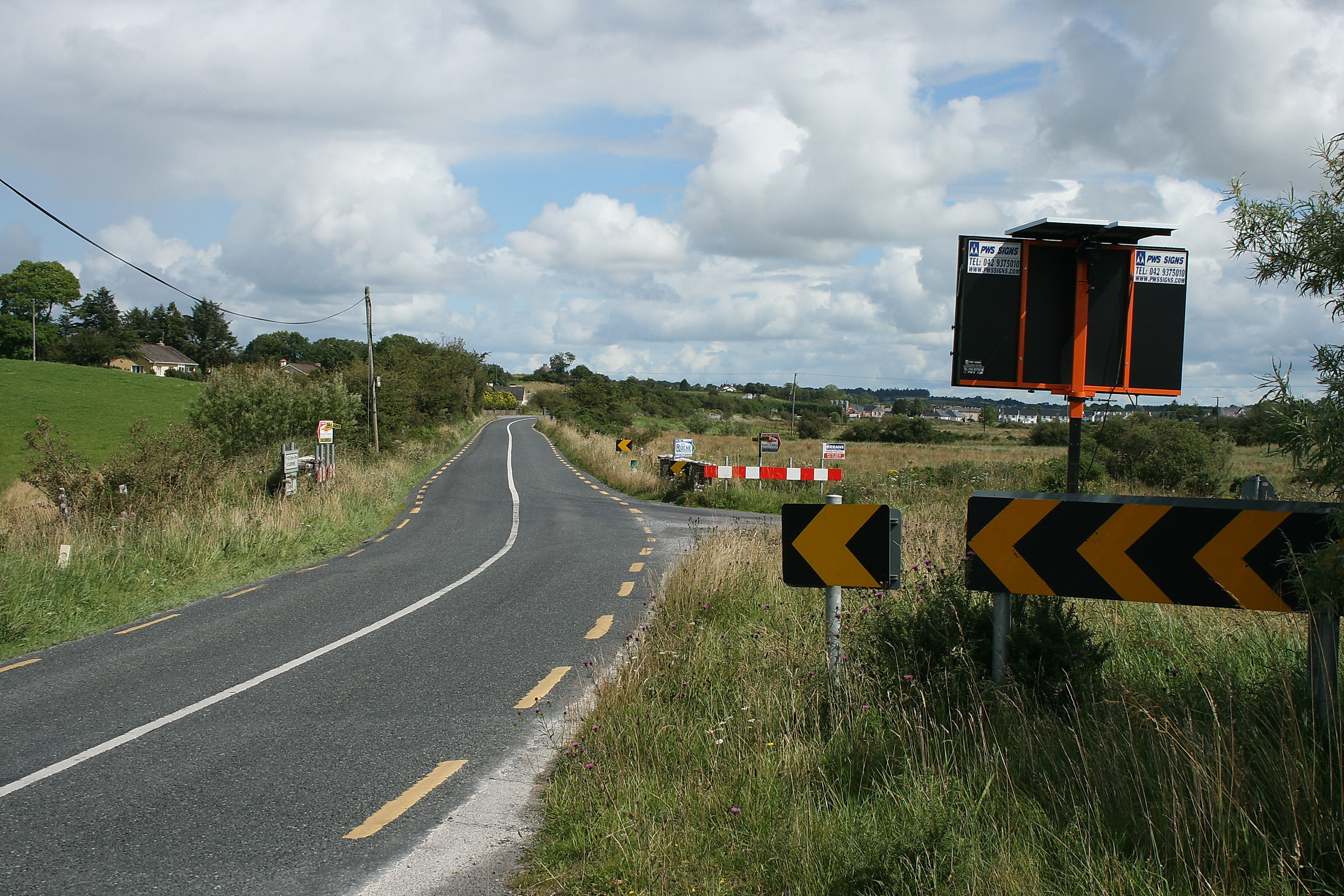
R327 approaching Cloonfad

The R327 road is a regional road in Ireland connecting the N60 east of Claremorris, County Mayo, to the R360 in County Galway.

The official description of the R327 from the Roads Act 1993 (Classification of Regional Roads) Order 2006 reads:

R327: Cuilmore, County Mayo - Pollremon, County Galway

Between its junction with N60 at Cuilmore in the county of Mayo and its junction with R360 at Pollremon in the county of Galway via Tulrohaun and Lugboy Cross in the county of Mayo: Culnacleha Bridge at the boundary between the county of Mayo and the county of Roscommon: Cloonfad in the county of Roscommon: and Kildaree in the county of Galway.

The road is 20 km (12 mi) long.

== See also ==
- List of roads of County Mayo
- National primary road
- National secondary road
- Regional road
- Roads in Ireland
