= R325 road (Ireland) =

Road in Ireland

R325 road
- Bóthar R325
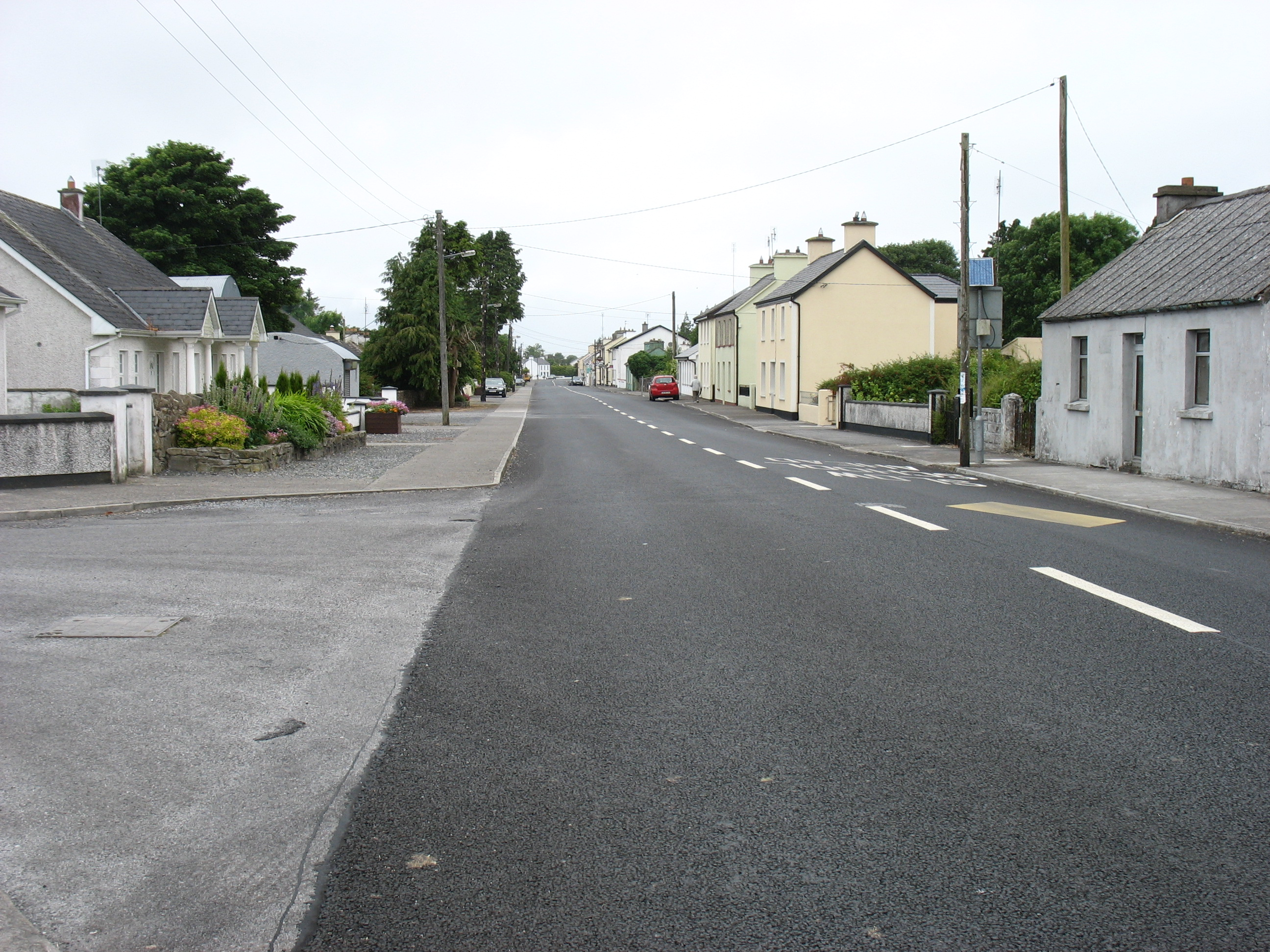
- Loughglinn on the R325

Route information
- Length: 24.5 km (15.2 mi)

Location
- Country: Ireland
- Primary destinations: County Mayo; Glentavraun (N83 and N17 roads); Kilmovee; County Roscommon; R293 road; Crosses the Lung River; Loughglinn (R326 road); Crosses the Cloonard River; Cloonarragh (R361 road)

Highway system
- Roads in Ireland; Motorways; Primary; Secondary; Regional

The R325 road is a regional road in County Mayo and County Roscommon in Ireland. It connects the N83 and N17 roads at Glentavraun, near Ireland West Airport in County Mayo, to the R361 at Cloonarragh near Castlerea in County Roscommon, a distance of 24.5 kilometres (15.2 mi).

The government legislation that defines the R325 — the Roads Act 1993 (Classification of Regional Roads) Order 2012 (Statutory Instrument 54 of 2012), provides the following official description:

Glentavraun, County Mayo — Cloonarragh, County Roscommon

Between its junction with N83 at Glentavraun in the county of Mayo and its junction with R361 at Cloonarragh in the county of Roscommon via Sonvolaun and Kilmovee in the county of Mayo: Crunaun, Kiltybranks, and Loughglinn in the county of Roscommon.

== See also ==
- List of roads in County Mayo
- National primary road
- National secondary road
- Regional road
- Roads in Ireland
