= R323 road (Ireland) =

Road in Ireland

R323 road
- Bóthar R323
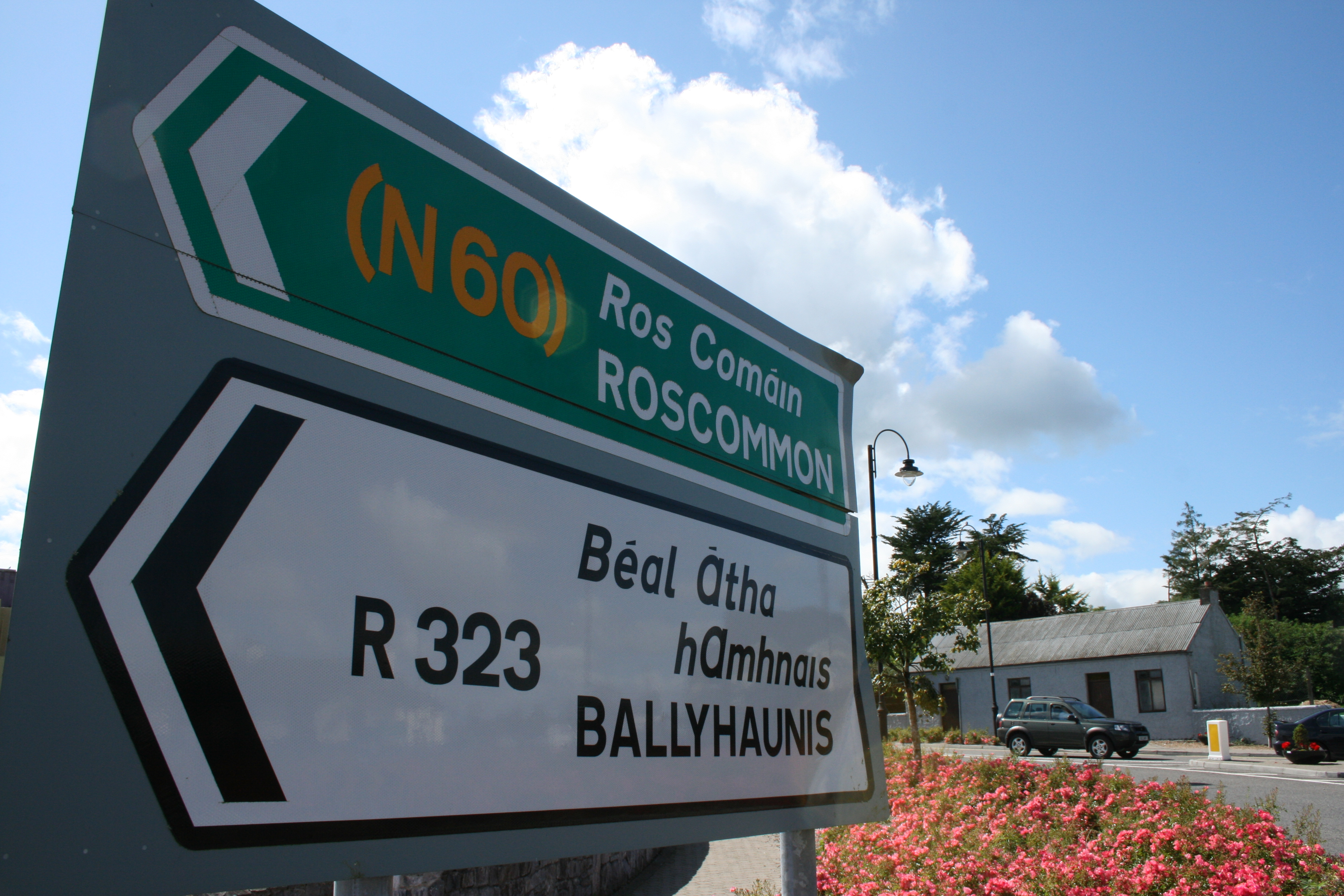
- R323 at Knock

Route information
- Length: 22 km (14 mi)

Location
- Country: Ireland
- Primary destinations: County Mayo; Kiltimagh starts at junction with the R320; Cloonlee; Knock crosses the N17; Ballyhaunis – terminates at junction with N83 and N60

Highway system
- Roads in Ireland; Motorways; Primary; Secondary; Regional

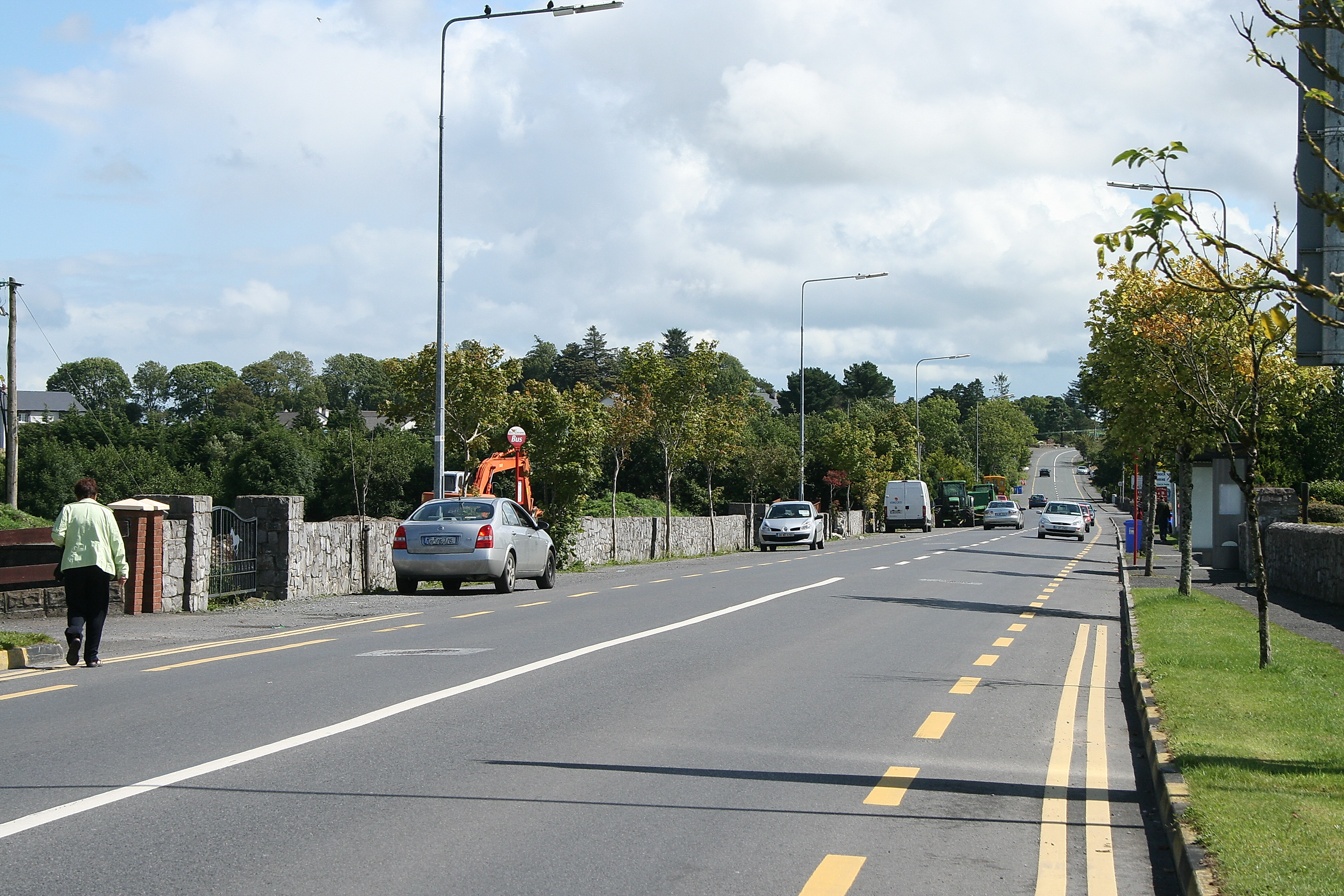
R323 heading east at Knock

The R323 road is a regional road in County Mayo, Ireland. Going from west to east, the route connects the towns of Kiltimagh, Knock, and Ballyhaunis. En route it crosses over the N17 national primary road at a grade separated junction in the village of Knock.

The official description of the R323 from the Roads Act 1993 (Classification of Regional Roads) Order 2006 reads:

R323 Kiltimagh - Knock - Ballyhaunis, County Mayo

Between its junction with R320 at Main Street Kiltimagh and its junction with N60 at Hazelhill in the town of Ballyhaunis via Thomas Street at Kiltimagh; Roosky, Cloonlee, Knock, Greenwood, Tooraree; and Relief Road in the town of Ballyhaunis all in the county of Mayo.

The road in southeast County Mayo is 20 km (12 mi) long (map of the road).

== See also ==
- List of roads of County Mayo
- National primary road
- National secondary road
- Roads in Ireland
