= R367 road (Ireland) =

Road in Ireland

R367 road
- Bóthar R367
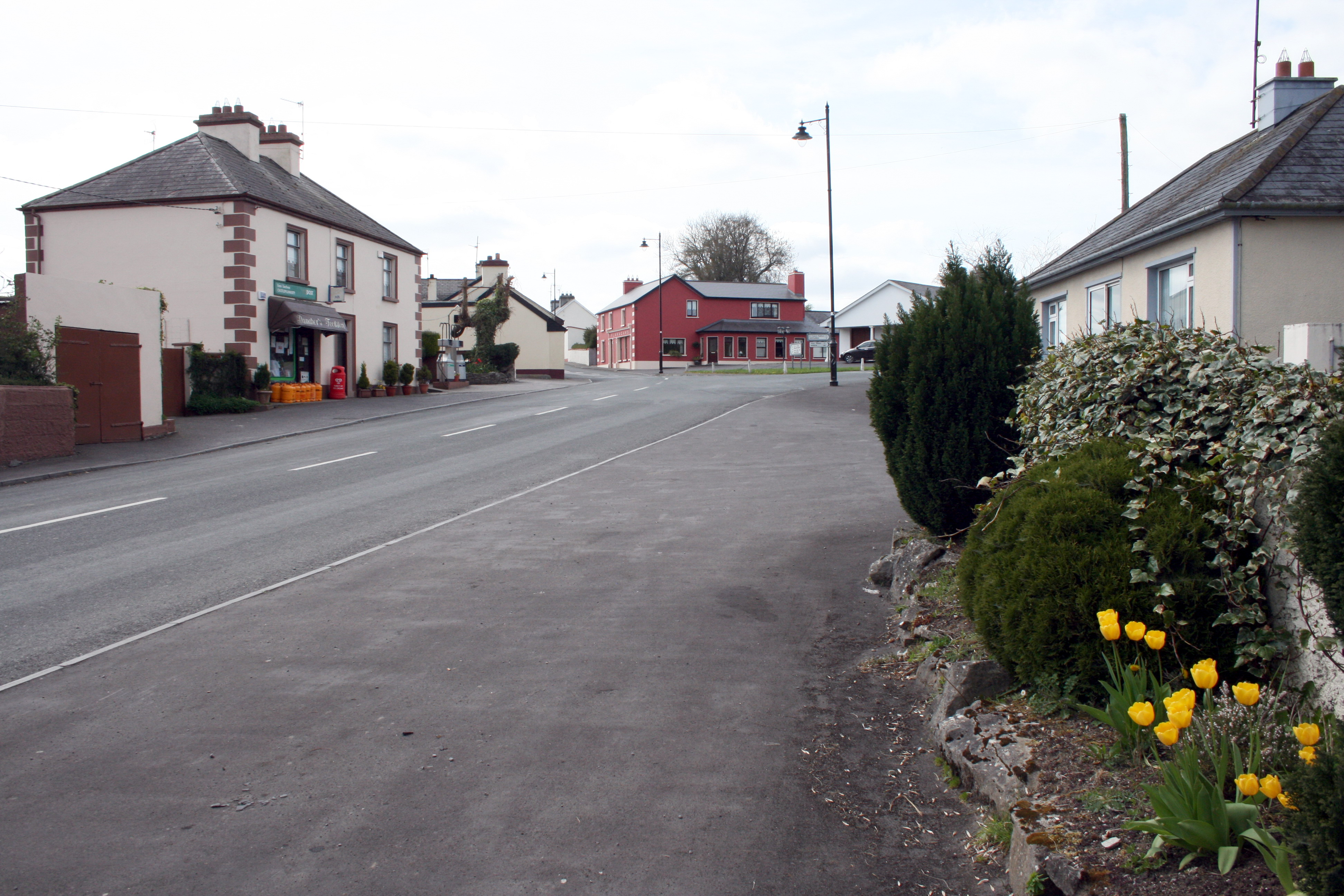
- R367 between Castleplunket and Tulsk

Route information
- Length: 20 km (12 mi)

Location
- Country: Ireland
- Primary destinations: County Roscommon; Two kilometres east of Ballymoe – leaves the N60; Level crossing of the Athlone to Castlebar railway line; Ballintober; Knockalaghta; Castleplunket – (R377); Tulsk – terminates at the N5

Highway system
- Roads in Ireland; Motorways; Primary; Secondary; Regional

The R367 road is a regional road in Ireland linking Ballymoe on the N60 with the N5 in Tulsk, all in County Roscommon. It passes through Ballintober, Knockalaghta and Castleplunket en route.

The road is 20 km (12 mi) long.

== See also ==
- Roads in Ireland
- National primary road
- National secondary road
