= R377 road =

R377 road may refer to:

- R377 road (Ireland)
- R377 road (South Africa)
