= R361 road (Ireland) =

Road in Ireland

R361 road
- Bóthar R361
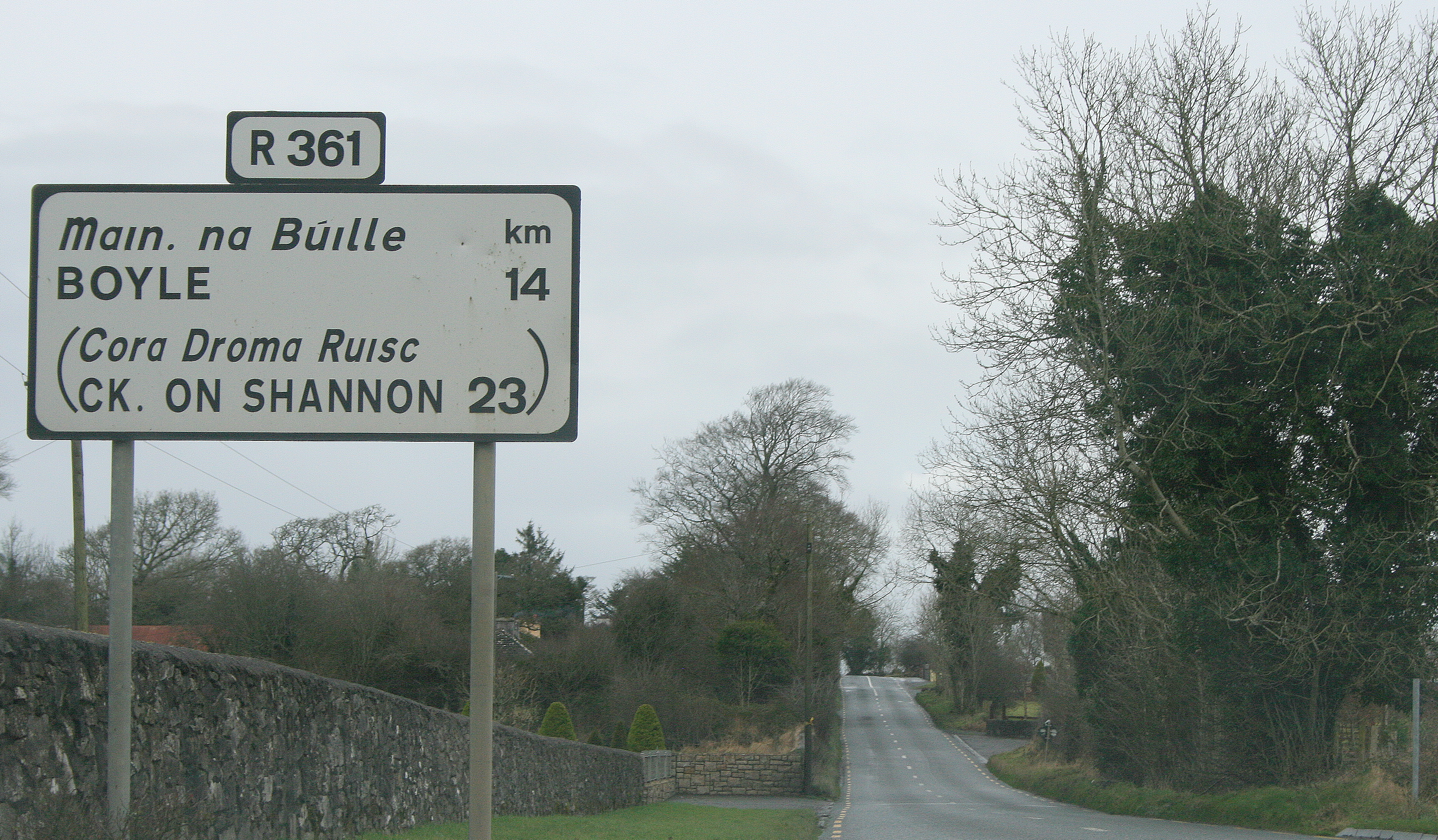
- R361 leaving Frenchpark

Route information
- Length: 38 km (24 mi)

Location
- Country: Ireland
- Primary destinations: County Galway; Williamstown - [Starts at junction with the R360; County Roscommon; Trien; Castlerea - N60 - crosses the River Suck; (R325); Cloonsheever; Frenchpark - (N5); (R370); Killerdoo; Boyle – terminates at junction with the N61

Highway system
- Roads in Ireland; Motorways; Primary; Secondary; Regional

The R361 road is a regional road mainly in County Roscommon, Ireland. South to north the route connects Williamstown to Boyle.

The road starts in County Galway for the first 4km and in County Roscommon for the rest of the route, which is 38 km (24 mi) long.

== See also ==
- Roads in Ireland
- National primary road
- National secondary road
