= Tulrahan =

Coordinates: 53°42′21″N 8°49′34″W

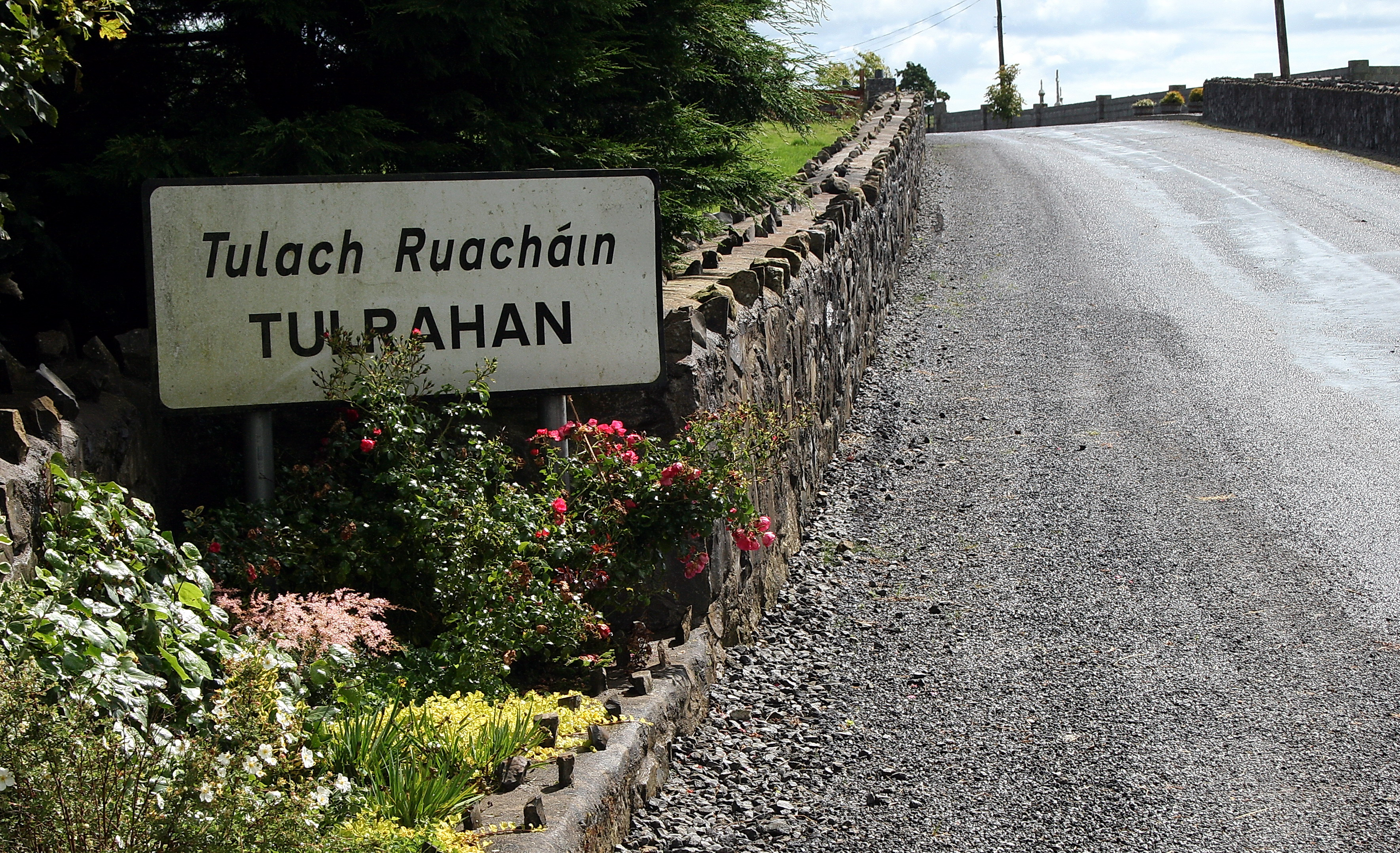
Road signage

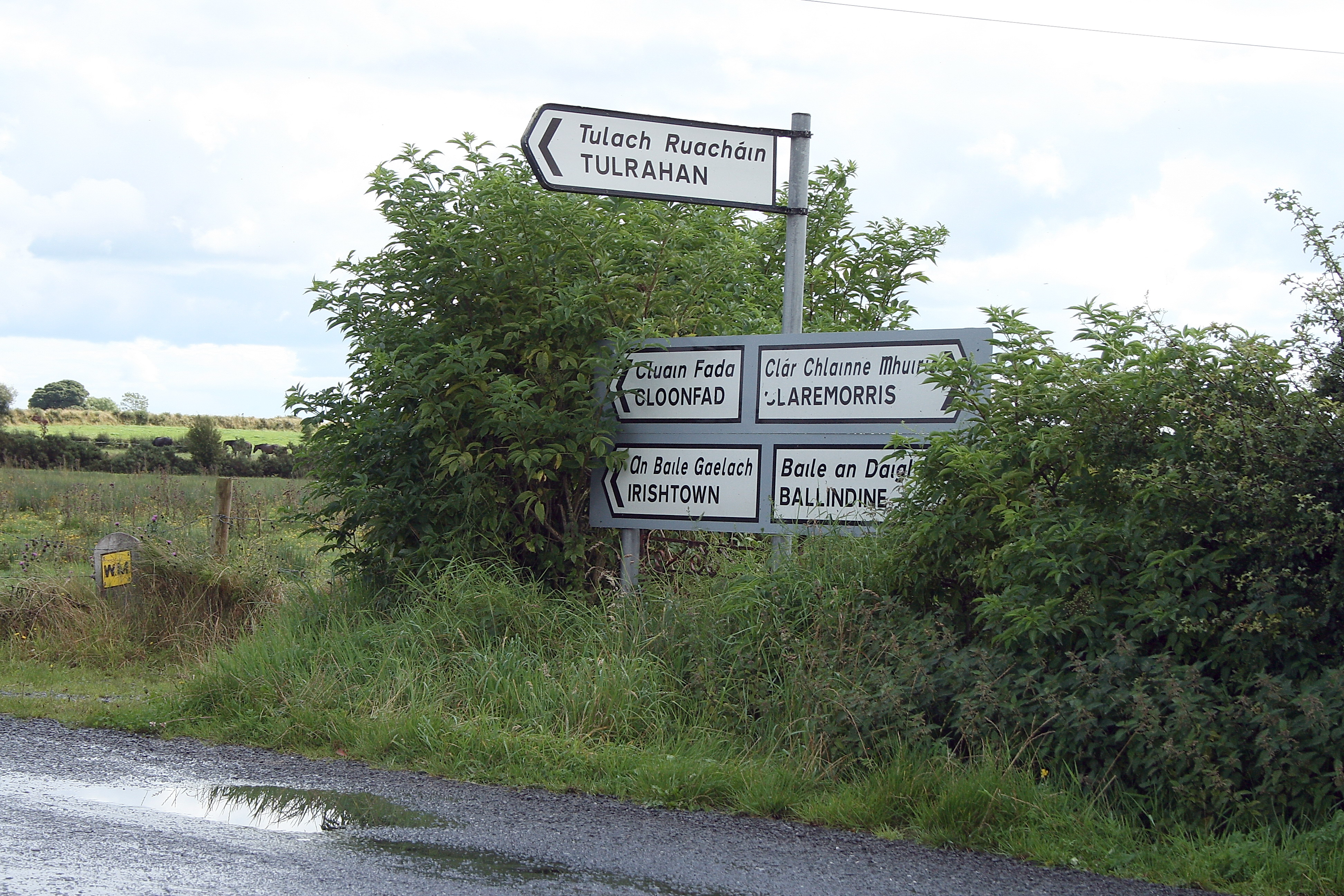
The R327 road at Tulrahan

Tulrahan (Irish: Tulach Ruacháin or Tulach Shrutháin, meaning 'hill of the stream'), also spelt Tulrohaun, is a village in County Mayo, Ireland. It is located off the R327 regional road roughly midway between Claremorris and Cloonfad.

The village consists of two graveyards and a few houses.

== Name ==
The Irish Placenames Database records varying spellings of the village name in both Irish and English. Such placename spelling variations are common in Ireland. The two Irish versions are Tulach Ruacháin (which appears on road signs at the entrance to the village) and Tulach Shrutháin, the latter being assigned as the official default Irish name by the database. Tulach means hillock or mound, and sruthán means stream, so the latter variant means hill of the stream. A number of anglicised spellings are recorded including Tulrahan, Tulrohaun, Tollrowghan, Tullrohane, and others.

== See also ==
- List of towns and villages in Ireland
