= R360 road (Ireland) =

Road in Ireland

R360 road
- Bóthar R360
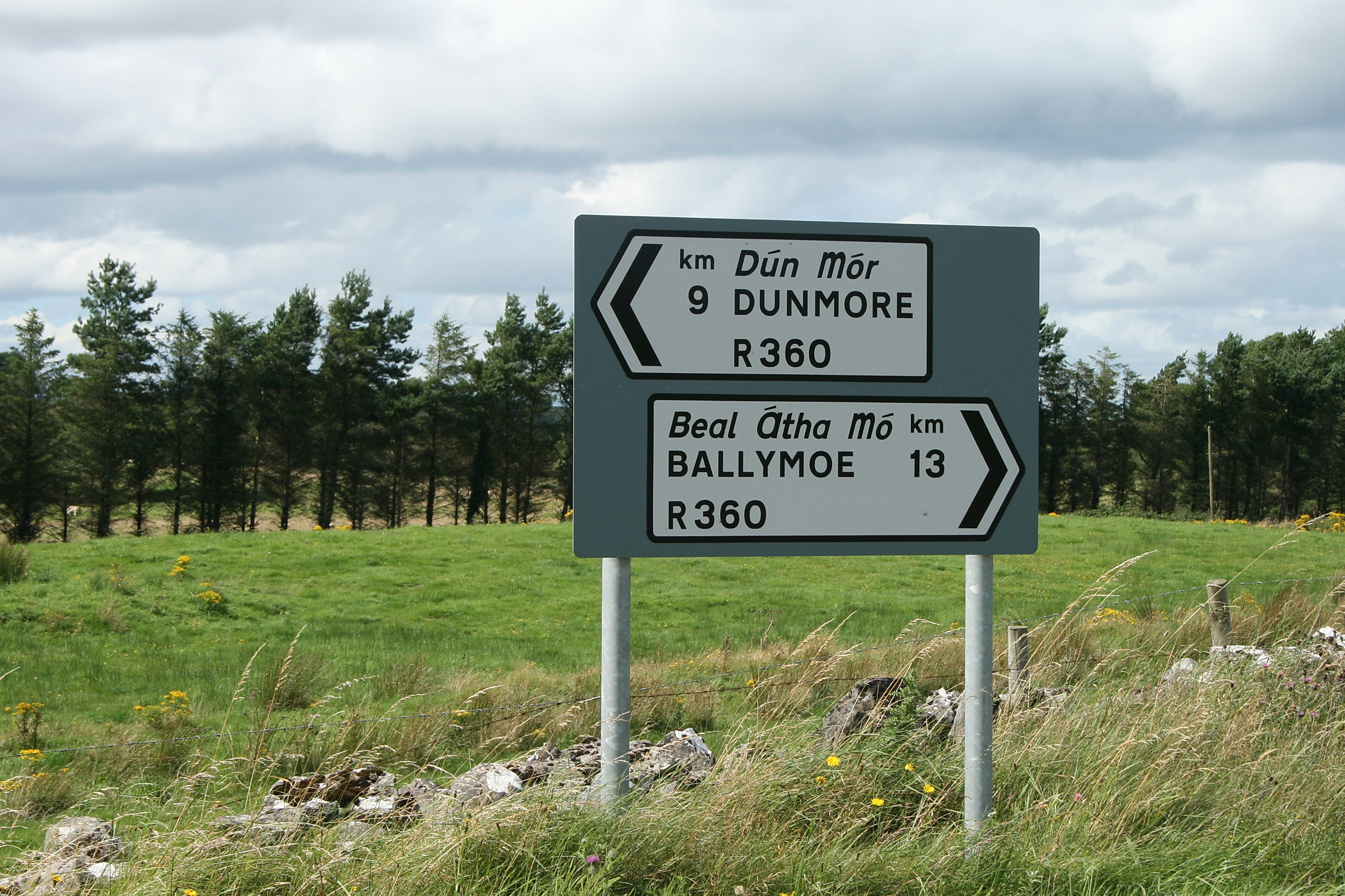
- R360 at R327 junction

Route information
- Length: 22 km (14 mi)

Location
- Country: Ireland
- Primary destinations: County Galway; Dunmore starts at junction with the N83, R328; (R362); Curragh West; (R327); Williamstown; (R361); Derrywode; (R364); Ballymoe – crosses the River Suck and terminates at junction with the N60

Highway system
- Roads in Ireland; Motorways; Primary; Secondary; Regional

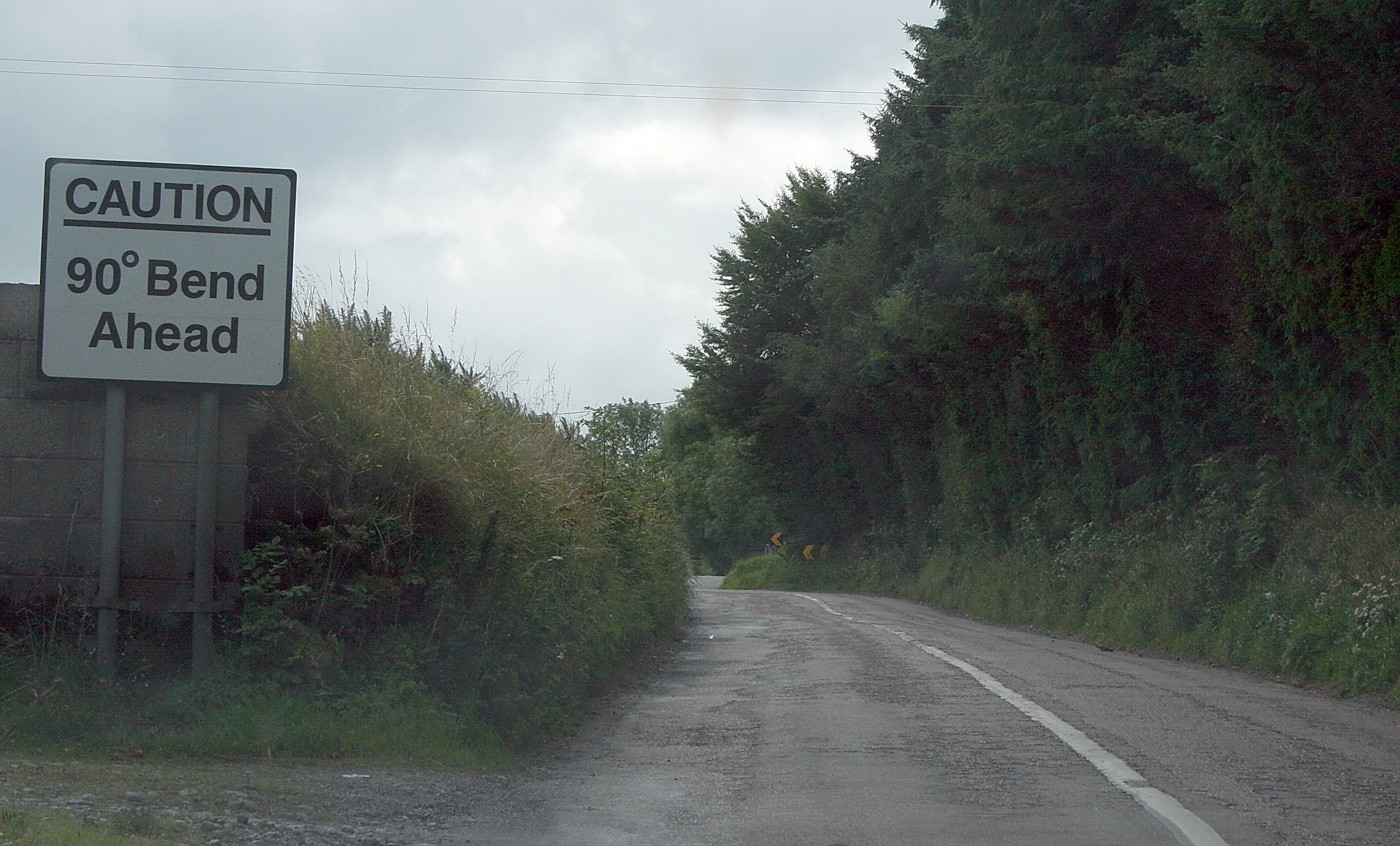
R360 - dangerous bends

The R360 road is a regional road in County Galway, Ireland. Southeast to northwest the route connects the town of Dunmore to Ballymoe. The road is in northwest County Galway and is 22 km (14 mi) long.

== See also ==
- Roads in Ireland
- National primary road
- National secondary road
