= Holywell ambush =

Ambush during Irish War of Independence, August 1920

- Part of the Irish War of Independence
| Date | 2 August 1920 |
| Location | Near Ballyhaunis, County Mayo 53°44′29″N 8°49′25″W |
| Result | Unsuccessful IRA ambush |

Belligerents
| Irish Republican Army; 4th Battalion (Ballyhaunis); East Mayo Brigade | (United Kingdom of Great Britain and Ireland) British Army (2nd Battalion Argyll and Sutherland Highlanders) |

Commanders and leaders
| Cmdt. Patrick Kenny | (United Kingdom of Great Britain and Ireland) Major Ritchie |

Strength
| 20 Volunteers in Ambush Party | 12–20 soldiers |

Casualties and losses
| 1 wounded | 3–10 wounded |
- Location within Ireland

The Holywell ambush was an ambush on the Ballyhaunis to Claremorris road near Holywell in the early hours of Monday, 2 August 1920 carried out by the Irish Republican Army (IRA) during the Irish War of Independence. Approximately 20 local IRA volunteers commanded by Patrick Kenny attacked a British Military detachment that was guarding a broken down petrol lorry.

== Background ==
A large lorry transporting petrol which was part of a British military convoy travelling from Claremorris towards Ballyhaunis came off the road on the Claremorris-Ballyhaunis road near Holywell on Saturday 31 July 1920. The driver of the lorry lost control and crashed off the road into the bog below. The lorry had sunk somewhat and was stuck in the bog. A military guard of between 12 and 20 British soldiers from the 2nd Battalion Argyll and Sutherland Highlanders, who were garrisoned in the old workhouse in Claremorris, was placed on the lorry while the rest of the convoy continued on their journey.

The soldiers set up camp in a little old abandoned house nearby, throwing a large tarpaulin over the roof of the house for shelter. They placed two sentries on the road while the rest of the guard retired to the abandoned house where they lit a fire in the ruin's fireplace. Martin Forkhan, a local IRA volunteer, happened upon the scene of the crashed lorry and immediately notified the Ballyhaunis Battalion Commandant, Patrick Kenny, of the situation. Kenny issued instructions to mobilise all officers in the Ballyhaunis Battalion area.

On that same night, a train leaving Ballyhaunis towards Westport was held up by armed and masked men not far from the military encampment. A unit of 25 IRA men under the command of Capt. Martin Forde (Bekan Coy) took control of the train after firing a number of warning shots. The IRA then removed steel shutters destined for Westport RIC Barracks and buried them in the bog nearby. The steel shutters were part of a program of fortification of RIC Barracks country-wide. Some of these men then mobilised with the other IRA officers gathering at Holywell Wood, where arrangements were made for an attempt to overpower and disarm the soldiers guarding the crashed lorry.

== Ambush ==
The assembled IRA (approximately 40 strong) marched to the site of the military encampment where they took up positions. The volunteers were unsure of the size of the British force guarding the lorry, as all they could see was one sentry. An IRA officer approached the sentry and asked for a light for a cigarette. The sentry sent him into the camp. As he lit his cigarette from the camp fire he looked around and counted 18 rifles present. It was then presumed that there were roughly 18 soldiers at the encampment. Cmdt. Kenny made a plan and ordered an attack, but as the IRA volunteers were crawling through the fields towards their assigned positions to surround the encampment, a line of motorcars appeared on the Claremorris road. The headlights from the motorcars would have exposed the positions taken up by the IRA, so due to their poor positions, the delay in organising a plan and the coming dawn, it was decided that the attack was to be postponed until the following night.

The next day, Sunday 1 August 1920 a section of men under the command of Capt. Patrick McNieve (Logboy Coy) was positioned near the site of the encampment to keep it under observation while the officers mobilised the entire battalion. On this day, there had been sports on in Aghamore and many of the battalions volunteers had gathered in that area so were easily located. Back at Holywell, scouts were posted on the surrounding roads to notify of any advancing British reinforcements and the road had been cut (a trench had been dug across it) to delay any traffic from getting by. During the day members of Cumann na mBán assisted in transferring ammunition from arms dumps to the ambush site. On that night with all available men in the battalion area mobilised the IRA assembled once more and organised a plan of attack. Orders were issued, they manoeuvred into their assigned positions and waited. D Coy (Brackloon) proceeded to their positions between Ballyhaunis and Holywell where they were on outpost duty guarding the road about half a mile from the ambush site. The IRA officers decided that while the soldiers in the camp slept, some volunteers would attempt to sneak into the camp and take their weapons. Cmdt. Patrick Kenny led a small ambush party of about 20 men and crept into the camp at approximately 3am. They were armed with shotguns and revolvers. A further 188 IRA men (many of them unarmed) from the Battalion were on scouting, road trenching, sentry and outpost duties in the surrounding district.

The ambush party successfully infiltrated the camp without alerting the sentries and Cmdt. Kenny managed to gather up five or six rifles that were stacked together. But as he was leaving the camp, the alarm was raised and the British soldiers began to awaken. The IRA shouted a demand for the British military guard to surrender; but when no surrender came, the IRA opened fire. Three British soldiers were badly wounded in the opening salvo. One took a full shotgun blast to his back, another had a portion of his arm blown off and the third was badly wounded in the leg. With three of their men knocked out, the British soldiers organised their defence and returned fire on the IRA. The IRA ambush party retreated to positions behind a fence where they maintained constant fire on the camp. A fierce gun battle ensued. In the darkness as Cmdt. Kenny retreated with the rifles in his arms he was caught in the crossfire and severely wounded by a shotgun blast from one of his own men. He had been shot in the left arm and face. He fell from his wounds and dropped the rifles he had been carrying. Capt. Martin Forde (Bekan Coy) and several other officers ran to Kenny's aid. Forde and his comrades were able to carry Kenny to safety. The battle continued on for about an hour and before dawn, just as the military guard seemed about to surrender, two lorries of British reinforcements came from Claremorris to their assistance. The British reinforcements opened fire from their lorries on the outposts as they encountered them who returned fire with their shotguns. With the IRA running low on ammunition and now out-gunned, Cmdt. Kenny issued an order for the IRA to retreat under fire. There are varied accounts of the length of time the ambush lasted. Some accounts state the attack on the camp lasted 15 minutes, with other accounts indicating that from beginning to end, the ambush lasted for between one and two hours. Dawn was breaking just as the engagement ended.

Ballyhaunis IRA September 1921: Back L-R:Capt. Pat McNieve (Logboy Coy), Capt Austin Tarpey (Holywell Coy), Bn Cmdt. Patrick Kenny, Vol Joe Taylor (Aghamore Coy), Vol John Forde (Bekan Coy), Capt. Luke Taylor (Aghamore Coy), Vol Sonny Biesty (Holywell Coy), Bn Vice Cmdt. Dom Byrne, Front L-R: Vol Jack Kilduff (Bekan Coy), Bn Adjt. Austin Kenny, Capt. Michael Devaney (Brackloon Coy), Capt. Jim Kilkenny (Crossard Coy), Lt Michael Nolan (Knock Coy). Nearly all of the men photographed played some part in the Holywell Ambush

== Aftermath ==
The IRA operation was deemed unsuccessful as they had not achieved their primary objective of disarming the British soldiers and their commanding officer was badly wounded in the attack. The inability to capture the British soldiers weapons would hamper the battalion and the wider East Mayo Brigade's ability to conduct large ambushes in an area that was already in very short supply of rifles and ammunition. There were varying accounts of casualties from both sides. The IRA inflicted a minimum of three casualties on the British side and the ambush gave many volunteers their first experience of battle. Some of the volunteers who took part in the ambush claimed that 5 and upwards of 10 on the British side were wounded with 3 dying subsequently. The British claimed that they had killed one IRA man and wounded several others. They also admitted that three of their soldiers were wounded. The following day, British police and military carried out an exhaustive search in the intervening districts. It was reported in the Western People, that in the search that followed, the police and military from Claremorris and Ballyhaunis found blood stains over the ground covered by the IRA and two shotguns, a loaded revolver and two overcoats. In reality the IRA suffered only one casualty, that of their Cmdt. Patrick Kenny. In the military drive that followed the number of private houses raided totalled one hundred and fifty, however nothing incriminating was found.

After Cmdt. Kenny was safely extracted from the engagement he was carried by Volunteers Jack and William Caulfield along with others to a house nearby and then on to Pat Healy's house. The British military's account reported that the soldiers witnessed a body being carried into a house nearby. From there he was taken to be treated first by Dr. A Smyth, Ballyhaunis, who was the battalion's Medical Officer. Kenny was moved to Mayo county infirmary and treated by Dr. McBride, however, it was deemed unsafe for him to stay there so after 24hrs he had to leave and was treated in Union hospital for 10 days (Dr. Hopkins Castlebar). Members of Cumann na Mban employed in the Union hospital had established an IRA ward in a disused portion of the hospital where numerous wounded volunteers were treated throughout the war. When Kenny had recovered sufficiently, he was taken to Surgeon M Ó Máille in Galway, where he received treatment for 5 weeks. He then went on to recuperate in the home of Pádraic Ó Máille TD near Maam in Connemara for four months. Ó Máille's home was used a safe house by the West Connemara, West Mayo and South Mayo IRA Brigades. Kenny returned to the Ballyhaunis area in April 1921.

== Sources ==
- Irish Military Archives: Military Service Pension Collection
- Irish Military Archives: Brigade Activity Files
- Irish Military Archives: Collins Papers
- Irish Newspaper Archive
- Irish Military Archives: Bureau of Military History
- Hegarty Thorne, Kathleen (2007). They Put the Flag a-Flyin'.
- Price, Dominic (2012). The Flame and the Candle.
- O'Malley, Ernie (2014). The Men Will Talk to Men: Mayo Interviews.
- Ó Brádaigh, Ruairí (1997). Dílseacht.
- Belfast Historical, and Educational Society (2014). Irish Bulletin Volume 2 (3rd May 1920 - 31st August 1920).
