= Castleplunket =

Village in County Roscommon, Ireland

Coordinates: 53°45′N 8°20′W

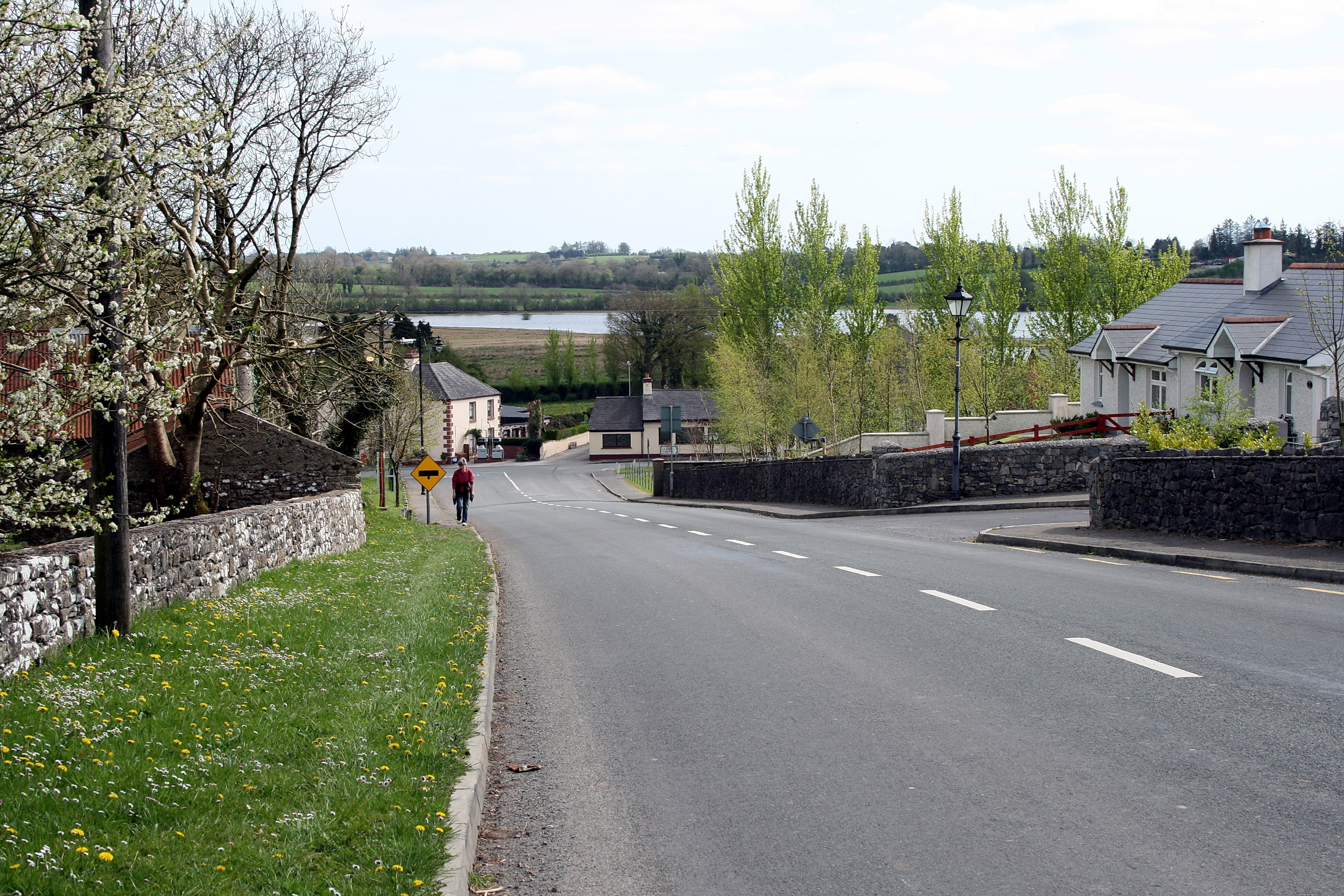
The R377 road in Castleplunket

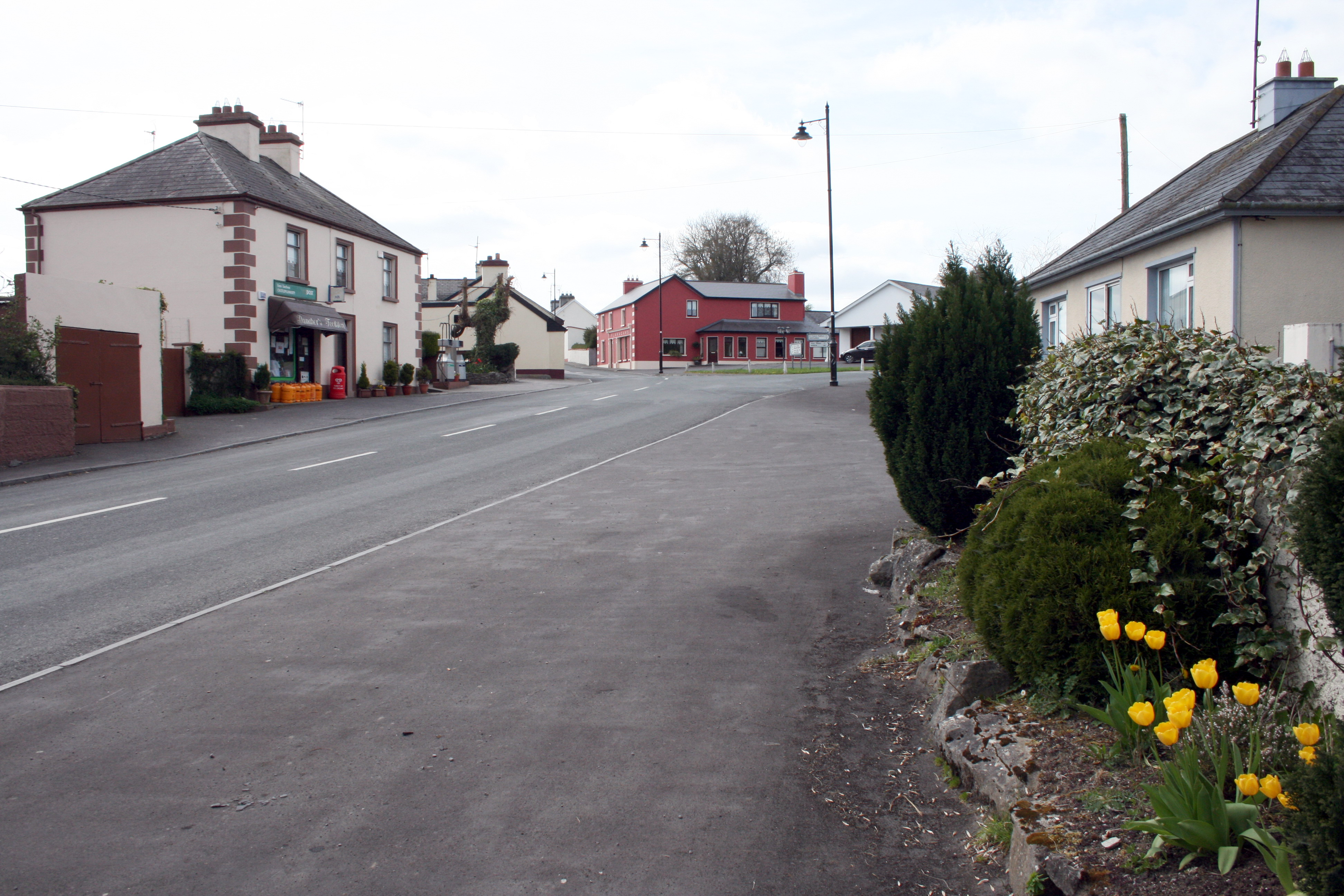
The R367 road in Castleplunket

Castleplunket (Irish: Lios Lachna), also spelled Castleplunkett, is a small village in County Roscommon, Ireland, situated at the junction of the R367 and R377 roads, some 10 km east of the town of Castlerea.

Castleplunket has a National School, a number of businesses called Flanagan's (including a pub), and a village development association.

The painter Roderic O'Conor (1860–1940) was born here.

== See also ==
- List of towns and villages in Ireland
