= R373 road (Ireland) =

Road in Ireland

R373 road
- Bóthar R373

Route information
- Length: 2.4 km (1.5 mi)

Location
- Country: Ireland
- Primary destinations: County Mayo; Kilkenny, near Breaffy (N60); Drumconlan; N5 road; Crosses the Castlebar River; Castlebar (R310 road)

Highway system
- Roads in Ireland; Motorways; Primary; Secondary; Regional

The R373 road is a regional road in central County Mayo in Ireland. It connects the N60 road at Kilkenny, near Breaffy, to the R310 road in Castlebar. The road is 2.4 kilometres (1.5 mi) long (map).

The government legislation that defines the R373, the Roads Act 1993 (Classification of Regional Roads) Order 2012 (Statutory Instrument 54 of 2012), provides the following official description:

R373: Breaffy — Castlebar, County Mayo

Between its junction with N60 at Kilkenny in the county of Mayo and its junction with the R310 at Bridge Street in the town of Castlebar via Drumconlan in the county of Mayo: Springfield, Lower Charles Street and Lucan Street in the town of Castlebar.

== See also ==
- List of roads of County Mayo
- National primary road
- National secondary road
- Regional road
- Roads in Ireland
