= N60 road (Ireland) =

Road connecting Irish towns of Roscommon and Castlebar

N60 road
- Bóthar N60
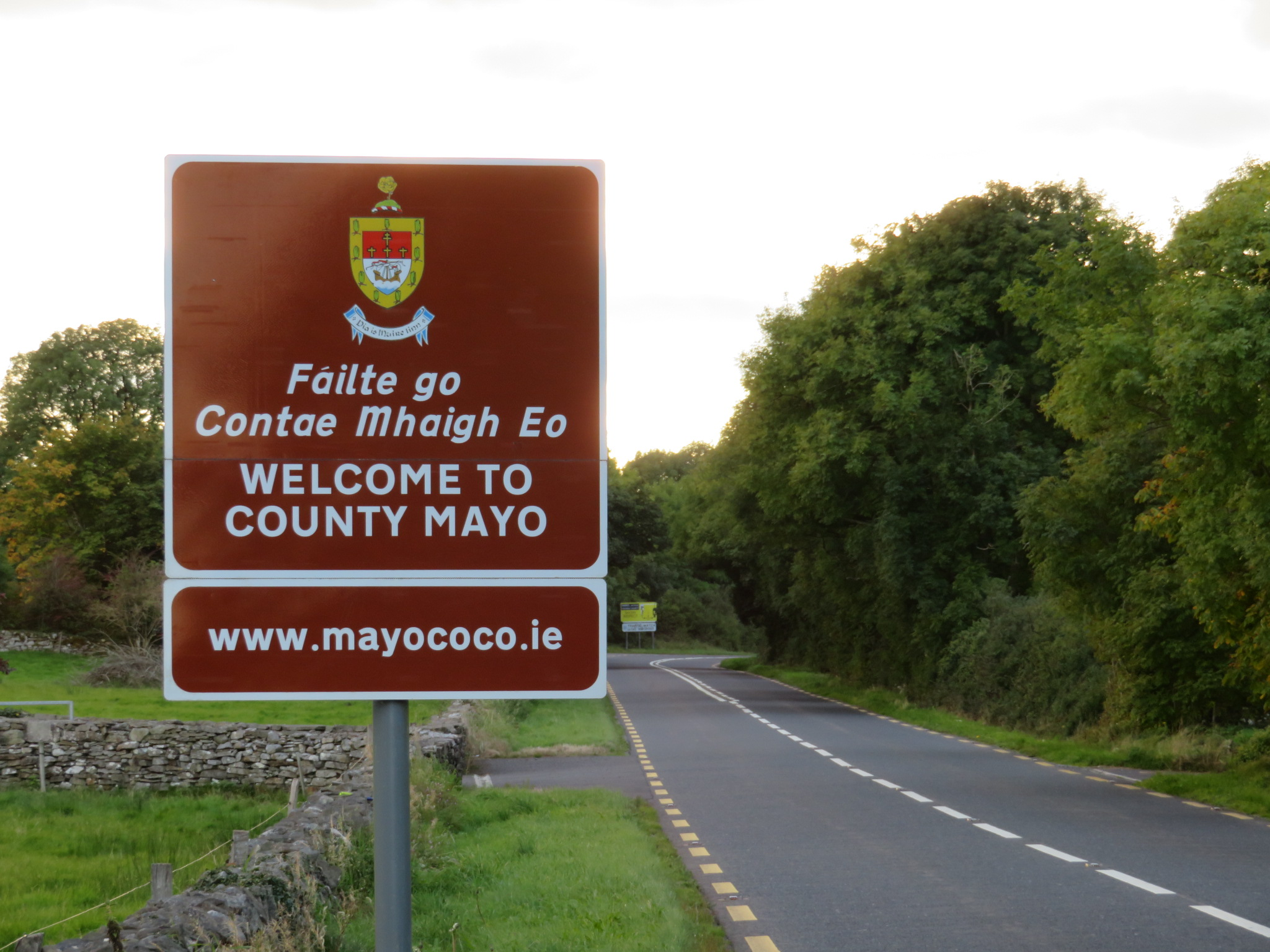
- The N60 entering County Mayo near Ballyhaunis

Route information
- Length: 92 km (57 mi)

Location
- Country: Ireland
- Primary destinations: County Roscommon; Roscommon town (N61); Oran; R367 road; Crosses the River Suck; County Galway; Ballymoe (R360); Crosses the Island River; County Roscommon; Crosses the River Suck; Castlerea (R377, R361); Crosses the Francis River; Crosses the River Suck; Ballinlough; County Mayo; Ballyhaunis (N83, R323); Crosses the Dalgan River; Brickens; Crosses the River Robe; R327 road; Claremorris (N17, R331, R320); Balla (R324); Manulla; Crosses the Manulla River; Breaghwy; Castlebar (R373, N84, N5)

Highway system
- Roads in Ireland; Motorways; Primary; Secondary; Regional

The N60 road is a national secondary road in Ireland, linking Castlebar, County Mayo to Roscommon town via Claremorris, Ballyhaunis and Castlerea. The busiest section of the N60 is between Castlebar and Claremorris, as this is one of the main links from County Mayo to the Irish motorway network at Tuam. This section of the route carries more than 7,000 vehicles daily.

The entire N60 is single carriageway and the vast majority has no hard shoulders. Some stretches have narrow driving lanes and poor horizontal alignment, and these sections have been targeted for upgrades in recent years. Between Castlebar and Claremorris, a 1.4 km section of road at Lagnamuck was realigned in 2019 and a 3.6 km realignment at Heathlawn was completed in 2024. Another 4 km realignment at Manulla is at the design stage.

In County Roscommon, a 3.4 km section of the N60 at Oran, between Ballymoe and Roscommon town, was realigned and upgraded in 2019.

Prior to these upgrades, the N60 had seen only minor realignment works carried out since the 1970s, most notably the Claremorris relief road, which was constructed in two stages between 1988 and 2000. This relief road removes the majority of the 7,000 vehicles daily from Claremorris town centre, in particular Mount Street—which was once notorious for tailbacks, as traffic previously gave way to the busy N17 that passed through the town prior to the opening of the N17 bypass in 2001.

A new route between Castlebar and Claremorris has been in planning for many years; it will bypass the village of Balla when constructed. However, design work on this project has been suspended.

== Route ==
The official description of the N60 from the Roads Act 1993 (Classification of National Roads) Order 2012 reads:

N60: Roscommon — Castlebar, County Mayo

Between its junction with N61 at Cloonbrackna in the county of Roscommon and its junction with N5 at Humbert Way in the town of Castlebar in the county of Mayo via Racecourse Road, Lissagallan and Drumatemple in the county of Roscommon: Ballymoe Bridge at the boundary between the county of Roscommon and the county of Galway: Ballymoe in the county of Galway: Harristown; Saint Patrick Street and Main Street at Castlerea; Fortaugustus, Ballinlough and Scregg in the county of Roscommon: Coolnafarna, Devlis; Abbey Street, Bridge Street and Clare Street at Ballyhaunis; Hazelhill, Brickeens, Cuilmore and Clare; Inner Relief Road and Mount Street in the town of Claremorris; Lugatemple, Brees, Balla, Moat, Manulla Bridge, Breaghwy and Kilkenny in the county of Mayo: and Station Road in the town of Castlebar.

The route originally continued from Castlebar to Westport; however, this section became part of the N5 in 1994. The route was curtailed by a further 2.5km when the N5 bypass of Castlebar opened in 2023. At this point the N60 terminates at its junction with the N5 Castlebar bypass, and the remaining former N60 road has been designated as the R308.

The N60 is 92.4 kilometres (57.4 mi) long.

== See also ==
- Roads in Ireland
- Motorways in Ireland
- National primary road
- Regional road
