= R377 road (Ireland) =

Road in Ireland

R377 road
- Bóthar R377
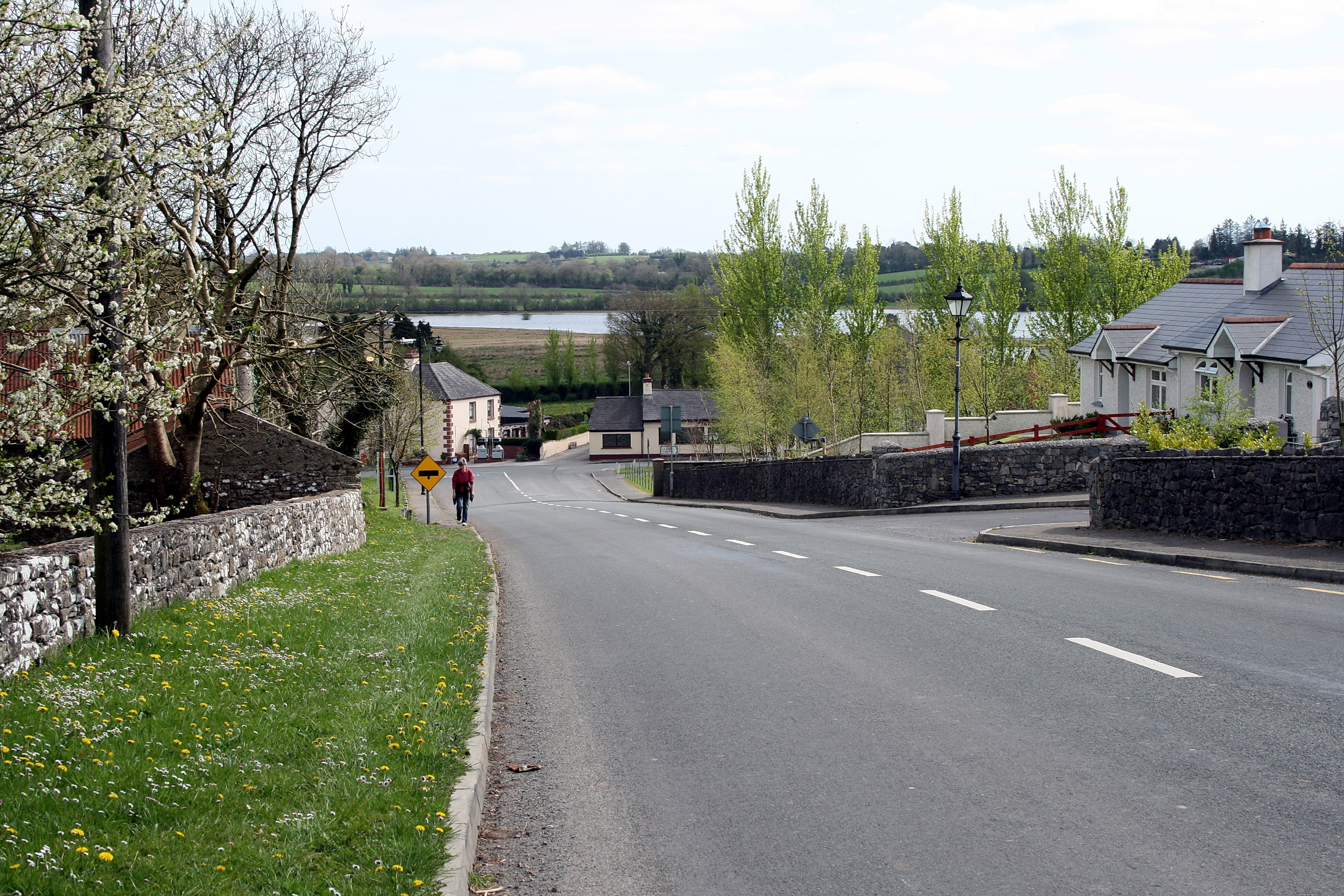
- R377 road in Castleplunket

Route information
- Length: 11.4 km (7.1 mi)

Location
- Country: Ireland
- Primary destinations: County Roscommon; Castleplunket (R367); Lissalway; Ballinphuill; Crosses the Termon River; Knockmurry; Castlerea (N60 road)

Highway system
- Roads in Ireland; Motorways; Primary; Secondary; Regional

The R377 road is a regional road in north County Roscommon in Ireland. It connects the R367 road at Castleplunket to the N60 road at Castlerea. The R377 is 11.4 kilometres (7.1 mi) long (map of the road).

The government legislation that defines the R377, the Roads Act 1993 (Classification of Regional Roads) Order 2012 (Statutory Instrument 54 of 2012), provides the following official description:

R377: Castleplunket — Castlerea, County Roscommon

Between its junction with R367 at Castleplunket and its junction with N60 at Saint Patrick Street Castlerea via Lissalway, Ballinphuill, Knockmurry; and Main Street at Castlerea all in the county of Roscommon.

== See also ==
- National primary road
- National secondary road
- Regional road
- Roads in Ireland
