= Ballymoe =

Village in County Galway, Ireland

Ballymoe Béal Átha Mó
- Village
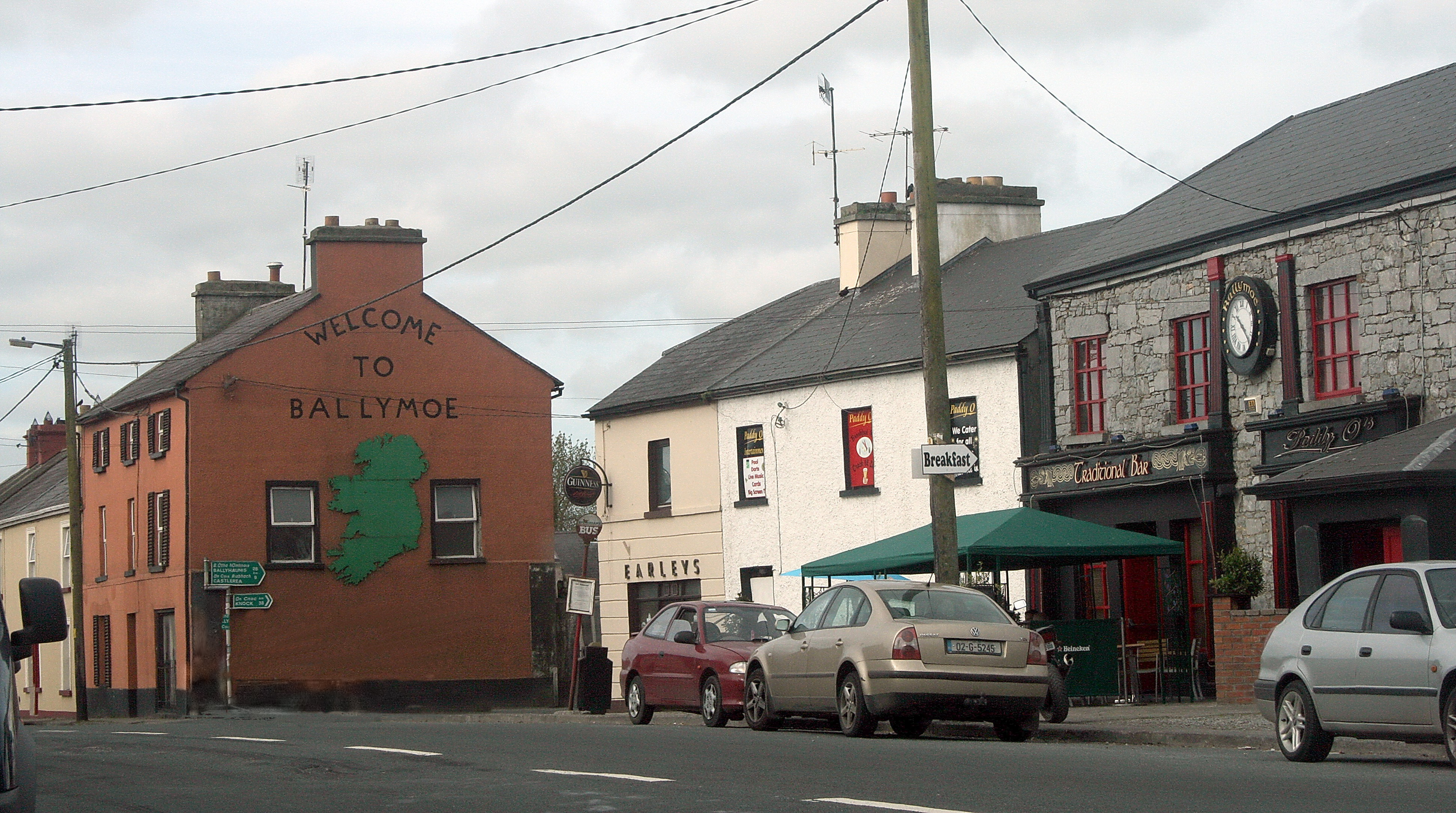

- Location in Ireland
- Coordinates: 53°42′00″N 8°28′00″W
- Country: Ireland
- Province: Connacht
- County: County Galway
- Elevation: 80 m (260 ft)
- Time zone: UTC+0 (WET)
  - Summer (DST): UTC-1 (IST (WEST))
- Irish Grid Reference: M692723

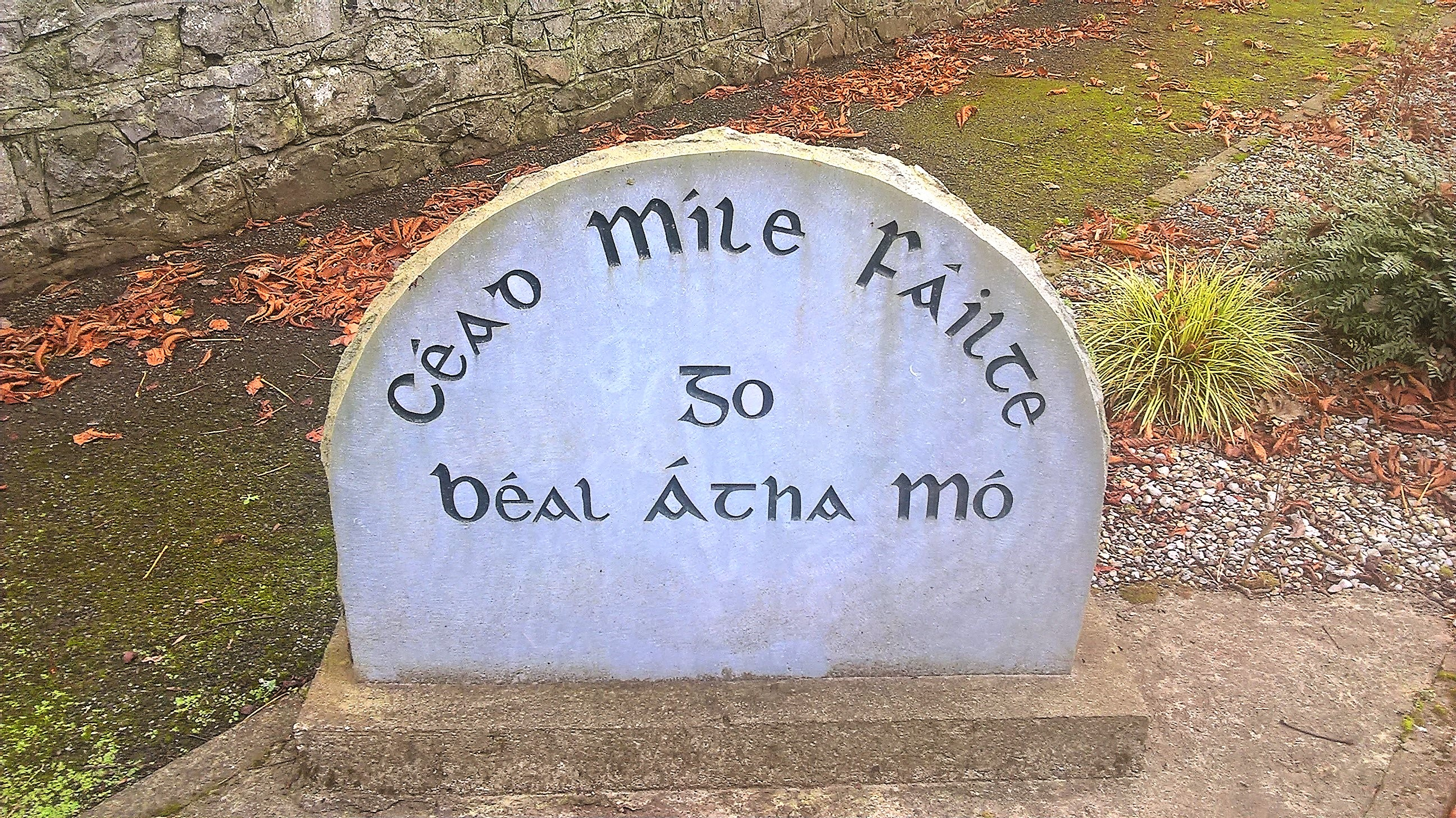
Welcome to Ballymoe sign in Irish

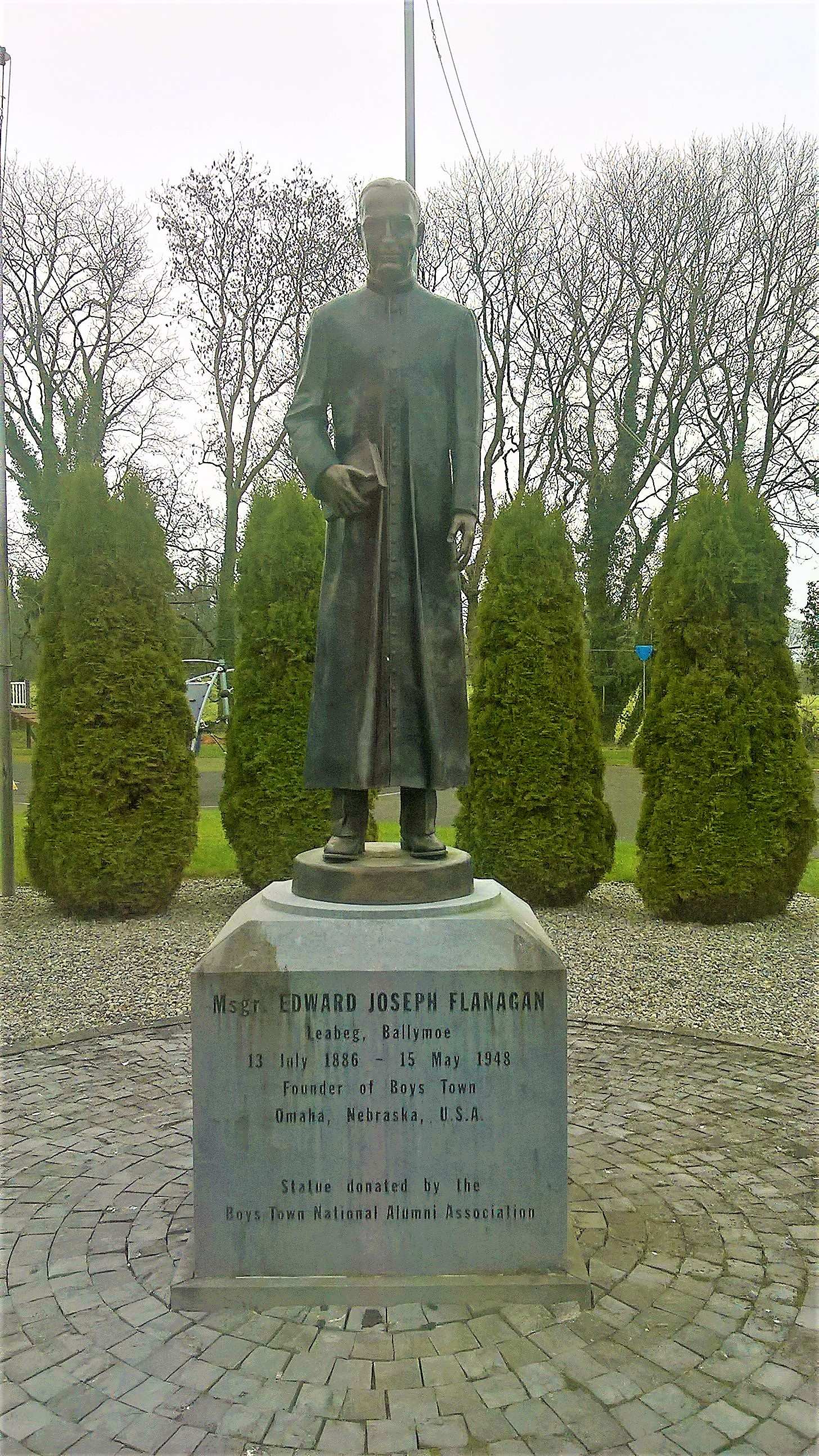
Fr. Edward J. Flanagan statue

Ballymoe (historically Bellamoe, from Irish: Béal Átha Mó, meaning 'ford-mouth of Mó') is a village in County Galway, Ireland. Ballymoe is situated on the western side of the River Suck that separates counties Galway and Roscommon. The N60 national secondary road meets the R360 regional road in the centre of the village.

== History ==
The name Béal Átha Mó is derived from a fort which was built by Meabh of Connacht, under the order of Mogh. The fort and village would later become known as Átha Mogh Mór and Béal Átha Mogh. The town is now the centre of a small rural area involved in scale mixed farming. Raised bogs, forts and a mass rock from penal times are features of Ballymoe today.

== People ==
- Éamonn Ceannt, one of the leaders of the Easter Rising and signatory to the Proclamation of the Irish Republic, was born in the police barracks in Ballymoe where his father James Kent, an officer in the Royal Irish Constabulary (RIC), was stationed. The Garda Síochána barracks in the town today is named in his honour.
- Fr. Edward J. Flanagan, founder of Boys Town, Nebraska, was born here
- Thomas Charles Beirne, Australian businessman, politician and philanthropist, was born nearby.
- James Daly, executed in 1920 for his role in the Connaught Rangers mutiny in India, was born in Ballymoe in 1899.

== See also ==
- List of towns and villages in Ireland
