= Cloonfad =

Cloonfad Cluain Fada
- Village
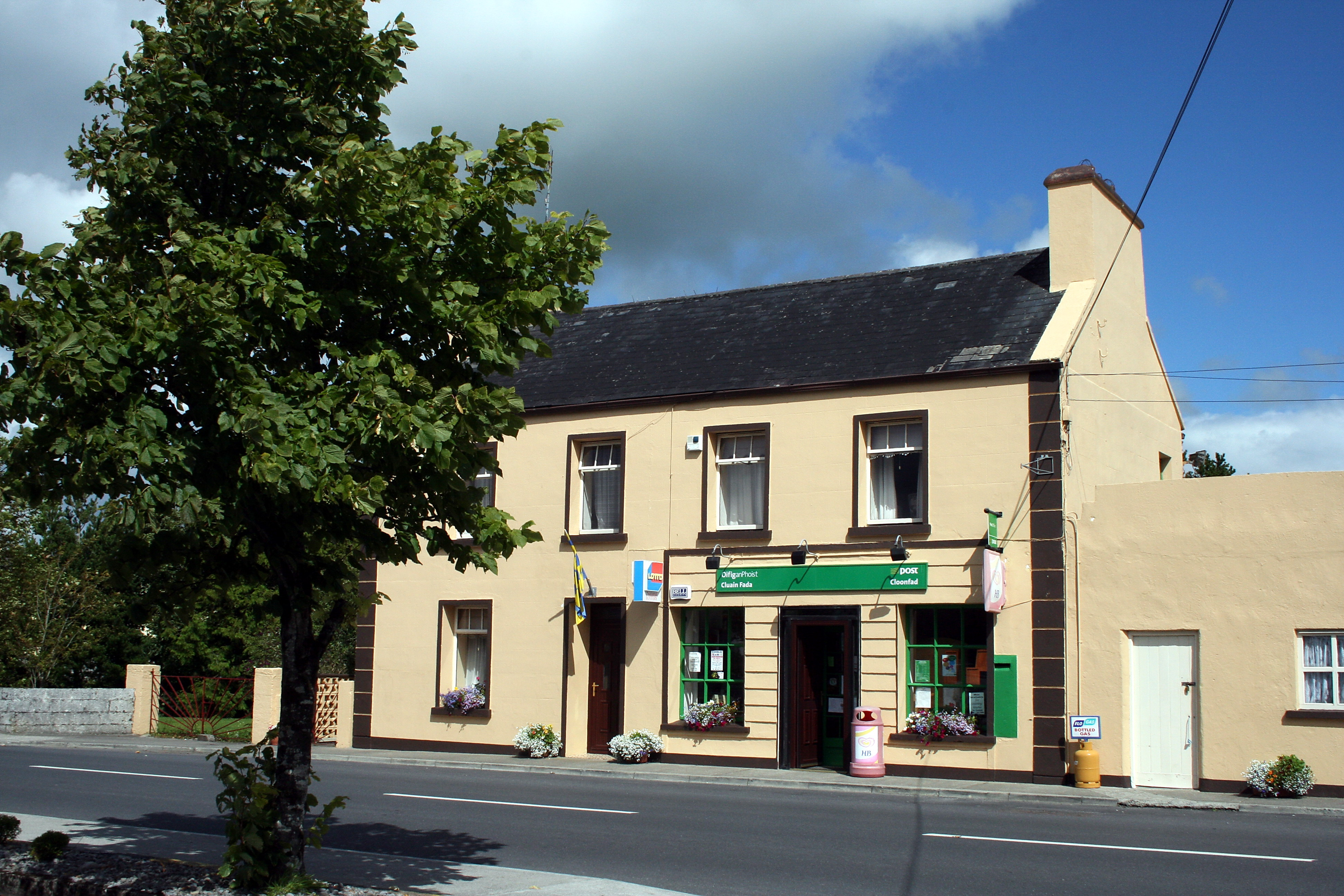
- Cloonfad Post Office

- Location in Ireland
- Coordinates: 53°41′31″N 8°44′33″W
- Country: Ireland
- Province: Connacht
- County: Roscommon
- Council: Roscommon County Council
- Dáil Éireann: Roscommon–Galway
- European Parliament: Midlands–North-West

Population (2016)
  - Total: 308
- Time zone: UTC+0 (WET)
  - Summer (DST): UTC-1 (IST (WEST))

Cloonfad (Irish: Cluain Fada, meaning 'long meadow') is a village in County Roscommon, Ireland, at the crossroads of the N83 National secondary road and the R327 regional road, about 10 km from the town of Ballyhaunis in County Mayo. A public walkway takes walkers to neighbouring villages through surrounding moorland. This habitat gave rise to the village's name in Irish - Cluain Fada or "Long Meadow". Cloonfad's local church, the Church of Saint Patrick, has been publishing an annual parish magazine since 1992 "The Cloonfad Magazine".

The village has two pubs (public houses). Local services include an An Post office, convenience shop, beauty parlour and a hair salon.

== Religion ==
The present church of St. Patrick was erected in 1934. Work on the foundation began in September 1932 with the foundation stone blessed by Thomas Gilmartin, Archbishop of Tuam in December 1932. The completed church was dedicated on 12 August 1934.

Alterations were made by the inclusion of porches by Fr. (later Monsignor) James Horan, parish priest of Knock, during his time in Cloonfad. In 1960 the sanctuary was revised to accommodate the new Liturgy of the Mass. The church underwent further renovation in the late 1990s.

== Sport ==
Established in the 1930s, Cloonfad Handball Club is one of the oldest sporting organisations in the parish. The present facilities were opened in 1980. The club is registered with County Roscommon Handball board. In addition to Gaelic handball, the club also plays host to racquetball.

Cloonfad United is the local association football (soccer) team. The club fields teams in several age categories from under-8s through under-16s, with a senior B-team and A-team.

== See also ==
- List of towns and villages in Ireland
