= N83 road (Ireland) =

Road between counties Galway and Mayo in Ireland

N83 road
- Bóthar N83
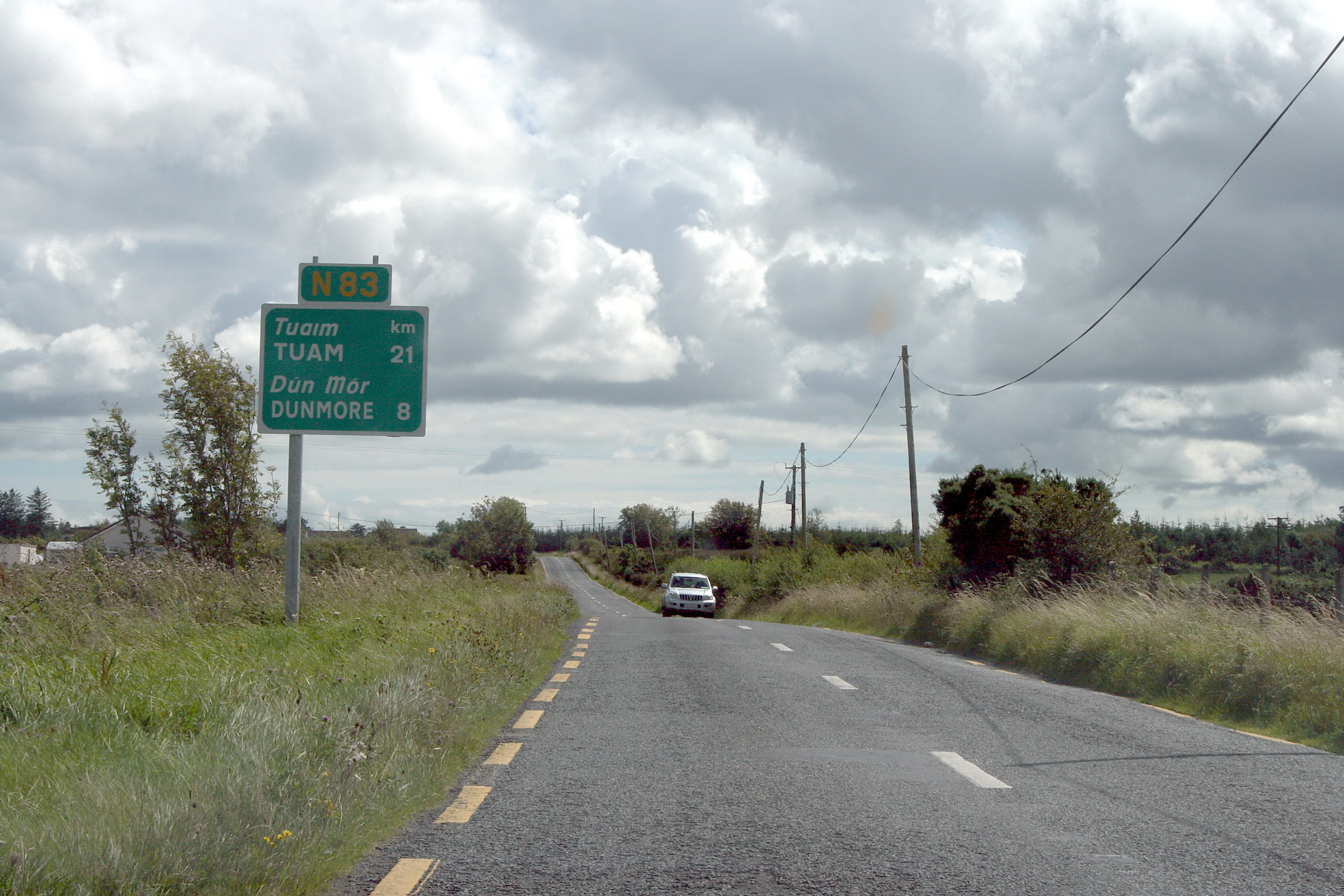
- N83 looking south at Cloonfad, County Roscommon

Route information
- Length: 87.5 km (54.4 mi)

Location
- Country: Ireland
- Primary destinations: County Mayo; Leaves the N17 south of Ireland West Airport; (R293); Tooreen; Ballyhaunis – (R323); joins/leaves the N60; County Roscommon; Cloonfad – (R327); County Galway; Dunmore – (R360), (R328); Brownsgrove; Tuam; Claregalway; Terminates at the N6 east of Galway

Highway system
- Roads in Ireland; Motorways; Primary; Secondary; Regional

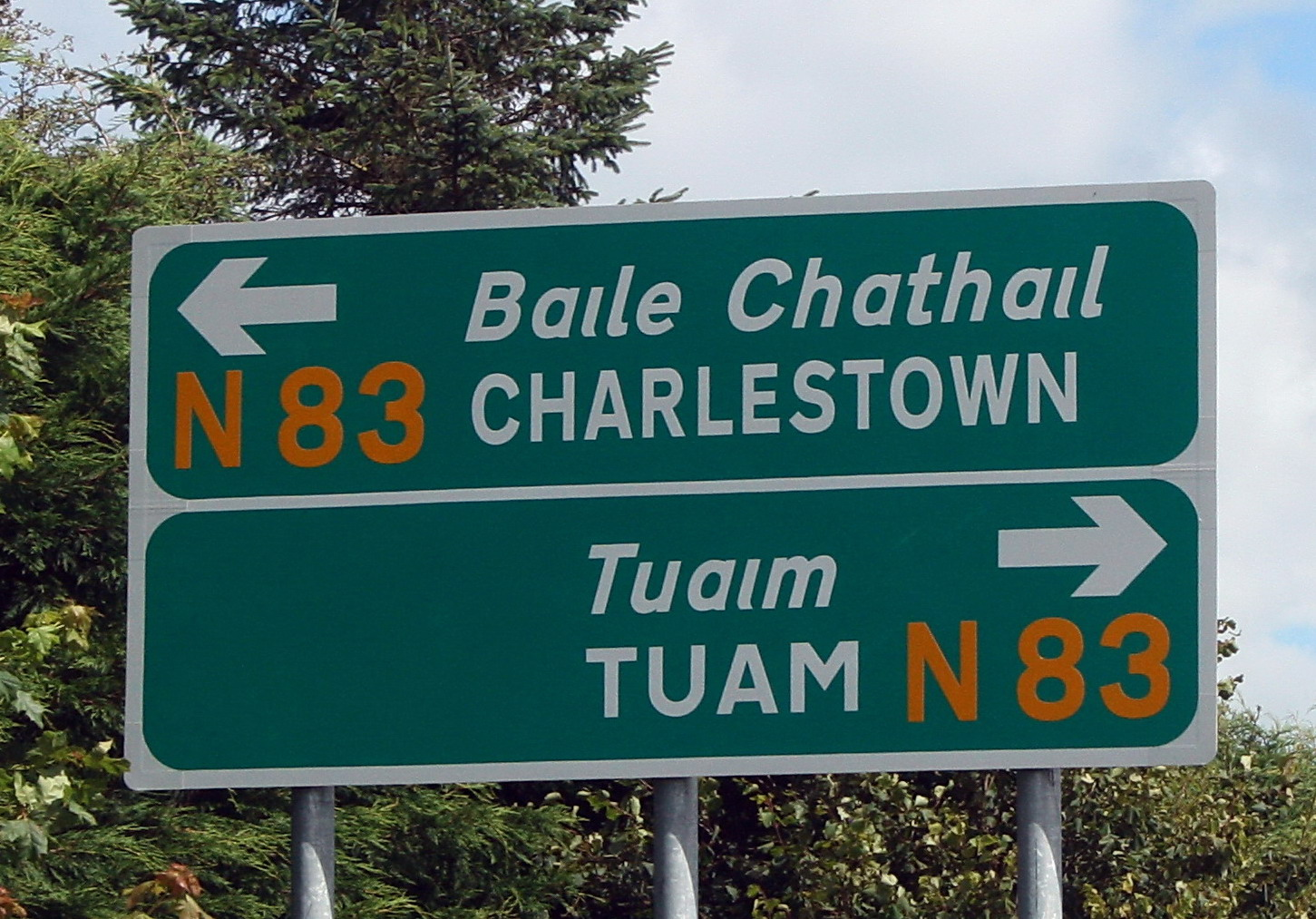

The N83 road is a national secondary road in Ireland that runs (north to south) from its junction with the N17 just south of Ireland West Airport in County Mayo to a point just north of Tuam, County Galway where it rejoins the N17. On 27 September 2017, the old N17 from the Kilmore Roundabout in Tuam to the junction with the N6 in Galway city was redesignated as the N83.

The total length is 87.5 km (54.4 mi).

== See also ==
- Roads in Ireland
- Motorways in Ireland
- National primary road
- Regional road
