= Ballyhaunis =

Town in County Mayo in Ireland

Ballyhaunis Béal Átha hAmhnais
- Town
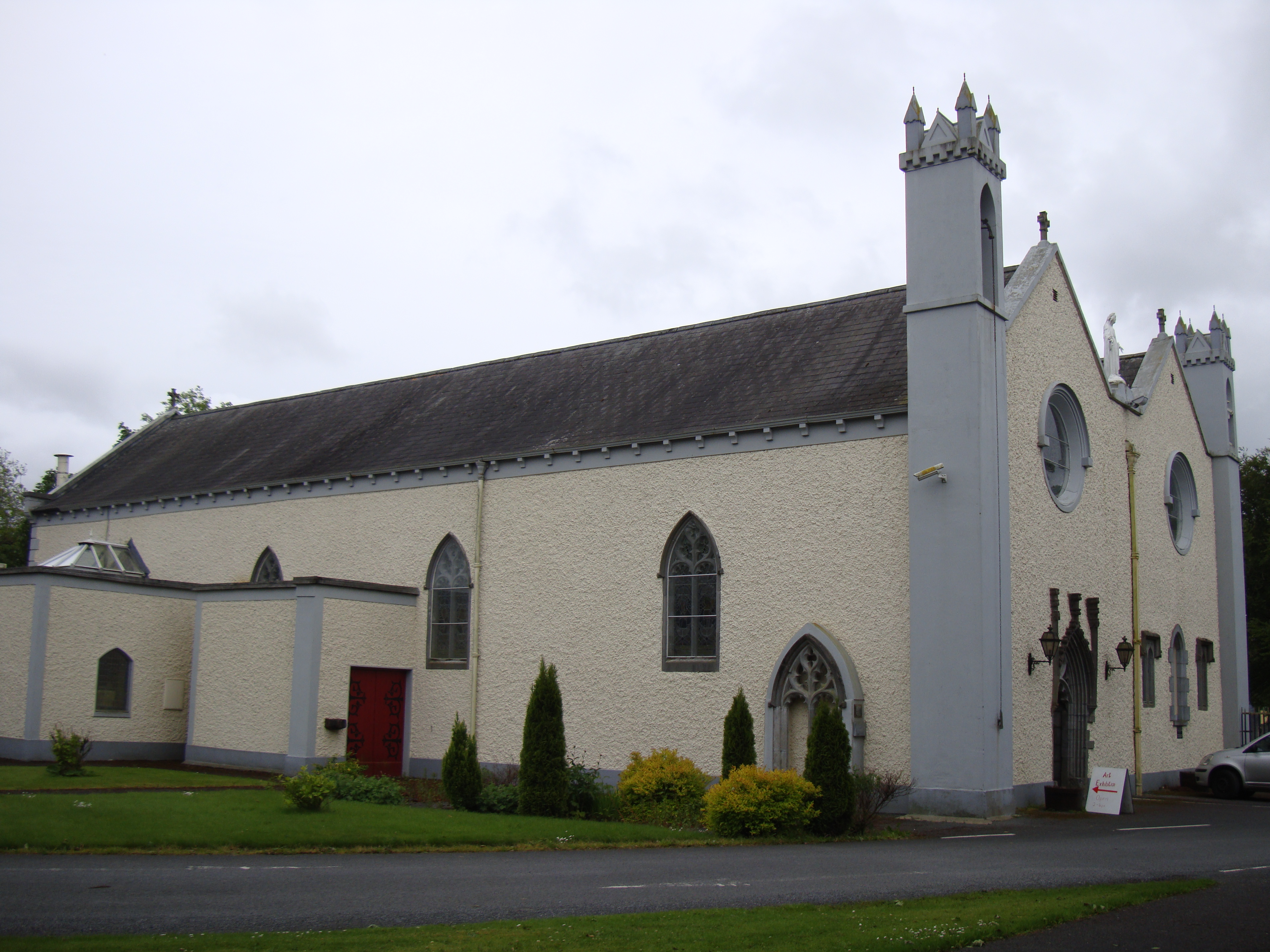
- Ballyhaunis Friary

- Location in Ireland
- Coordinates: 53°46′00″N 8°46′00″W
- Country: Ireland
- Province: Connacht
- County: County Mayo
- Elevation: 89 m (292 ft)

Population (2022)
  - Total: 2,773
- Time zone: UTC+0 (WET)
  - Summer (DST): UTC+1 (IST (WEST))
- Irish Grid Reference: M498794
- Website: www.ballyhaunis.com

Ballyhaunis (Irish: Béal Átha hAmhnais, meaning 'ford-mouth of strife') is a town in County Mayo, Ireland. It is at the crossroads of the N60 and N83 National secondary roads and on the railway line linking Dublin to Westport and Ballina. Ballyhaunis is within both the Roman Catholic and civil parishes of Annagh.

It is thought that the town grew up around St Mary's Augustinian Friary (popularly referred to as "the Abbey"), which was founded in 1348, according to local tradition. The town and its hinterland contain a number of megalithic monuments.

Farming, private business and industry are the main sources of employment. As of the 2022 census, Ballyhaunis had a population of 2,773.

== History ==
=== War of Independence ===
On 2 August 1920, during the Irish War of Independence, the Irish Republican Army (IRA) ambushed a British Army lorry on the Claremorris road from Ballyhaunis, seizing weapons and ammunition. The spot of the ambush, known as the Holywell Ambush, is marked by a high cross.

On 1 April 1921, Sean Corcoran, O/C of the IRA's East Mayo Brigade, was shot dead by British soldiers after a short gunfight at Crossard crossroads (6 km north of Ballyhaunis). A cross marks the spot where Corcoran died. Later that same day, a member of the Black and Tans was killed by the IRA in the town. In retaliation, the Black and Tans executed Michael Coen, a local man who was an IRA volunteer. Coen is believed not to have taken part in any of the preceding incidents. A monument to Coen was placed on the Cloonfad/Galway road from Ballyhaunis. In May 1921, Patrick Boland, captain of the Corssard Coy, IRA, was killed by crown forces.

=== 1990s ===
In 1999, Ballyhaunis was one of several locations in the European Union selected to trial a local currency project, known as the ROMA, designed to develop the local economy and ease the transition to the euro.

== Protected buildings ==
According to Mayo County Council, four buildings in the town are protected under Part IV of the Planning and Development Act 2000. These protected structures include:

- St Patrick's Parish Church (a Roman Catholic church)
- The former St Joseph's Convent
- St. Mary's Augustinian Friary
- The Ulster Bank

== Demographics ==
According to the 2016 census, Ballyhaunis had a population of 2,366. This had increased to 2,773 by the time of the 2022 census.

As of the 2011 census, non-Irish nationals made up 42% of the population, which was much higher than the national average and the highest of any town in Ireland. Poles and Pakistanis made up the largest groups of immigrants. As of 2015, ethnic Irish people made up approximately 40% of the population.

In terms of religion, the 2016 census indicated that Catholicism was the most common religion (with 1,410 of 2,366 indicating that they were Catholic). There are two Roman Catholic churches in the town. It also has one of the highest proportions of Muslims in Ireland, representing approximately 23% of the town's population as of the 2016 census. Ballyhaunis is home to Ireland's first purpose-built mosque, the first mosque in Ireland outside Dublin.

== Media ==
MidWest Radio is based at Ballyhaunis, and is a local radio station for Counties Mayo, Galway, Roscommon, Sligo and Leitrim.

Annagh Magazine is an annual publication that appears each December, containing material of local interest. It was established by Ballyhaunis Junior Chamber in 1977, and named after the local parish. The first edition was published at Christmas 1978. It includes articles about local events over the past year, as well as contributions covering Ballyhaunis history and culture.

== Education ==
The town has a single primary school and secondary school; the co-educational primary school was formed by the merging of the town's original two primary schools, St Mary's Boys' National School and St Joseph's Girls' National School, to form Scoil Iosa National School. Ballyhaunis Community School, as was the case with a lot of community schools, was based on the merging of three schools that previously existed independently, St. Joseph's Convent Secondary School, Ballyhaunis Vocational School, and St. Patrick's College; the school first opened in September 1977.

== Transport ==
=== Bus ===
The town is connected by Expressway bus route 64 which serves Galway and Derry via Sligo.

=== Rail ===
The area is served by Ballyhaunis railway station, a station on the Dublin–Westport rail service. The station opened on 1 October 1861, and its 150th anniversary was celebrated by a Ballyhaunis Railway Station-themed edition of the local Annagh Magazine in 2011.

== Sports ==
Ballyhaunis GAA is the main sporting team in the town, fielding teams in both Gaelic football and hurling. Other sports played in Ballyhaunis include rugby, boxing, cricket, and soccer, and the town has three GAA pitches, two football pitches, two rugby pitches, a football astro pitch, a football and basketball court and a cricket training pitch.

== Twin towns ==
Ballyhaunis is twinned with:

- Guilers, France (1984)

== Notable people ==
- Jack Coyne – Gaelic footballer on the Mayo county football team
- Charles Dillon – buried in the Friary with many of his ancestors. The Dillon family were Normans who developed the town from the 1200s.
- Seán Flanagan – Gaelic footballer, politician and government Minister.
- Jim Higgins – Senator, TD and Member of the European Parliament.
- Keith Higgins – full back on the senior Mayo county football team
- Anthony Jordan – author and biographer.
- Bill Naughton – playwright; wrote Alfie (1963), the basis of two film adaptations.
- Pamela Uba – Miss Ireland contest winner in 2021.
