= Williamstown, County Galway =

Village in County Galway, Ireland

Coordinates: 53°40′39″N 8°34′46″W

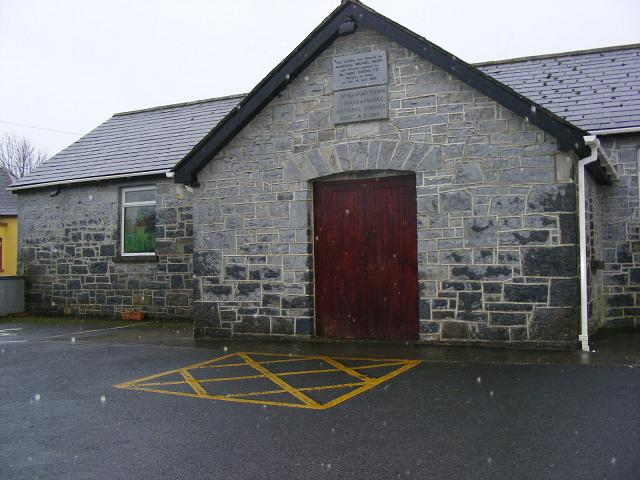
Williamstown Parish Hall

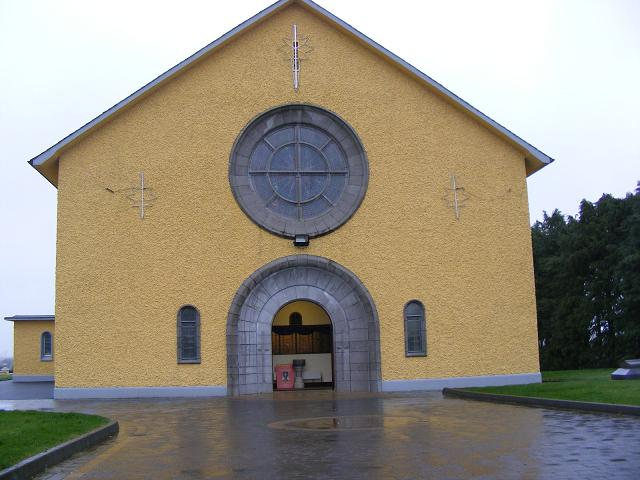
Williamstown's Roman Catholic church dates to the mid-1950s

Williamstown (Irish: Baile Uilliam/Baile Liam, meaning 'William's town') is a small village in County Galway, Ireland. It is in the northeast of the county, on the R360 road in the townland of Corralough. According to the 2016 census, the population of the village was 148.

Founded in the 1830s, the village of Williamstown takes its name from William McDermott, a local landlord and barrister who owned the nearby Springfield estate.

Williamstown GAA fields an Intermediate and Junior Gaelic football team as well as various underage teams. The Intermediate team were promoted from Junior A in 2006. Irish dancing groups and the Williamstown Scouts hold meetings in the parish hall that is also used as the playschool. The town's national school (primary school) is Sacred Heart National School.

Williamstown hosts an annual festival in August. It includes treasure hunts, sports days, and other activities.

== People ==
- Michael McGovern (1847 - 1933), Irish American labour poet.

== See also ==
- List of towns and villages in Ireland
