= Tubbercurry railway station =

Former railway station in County Sligo, Ireland

Tubbercurry
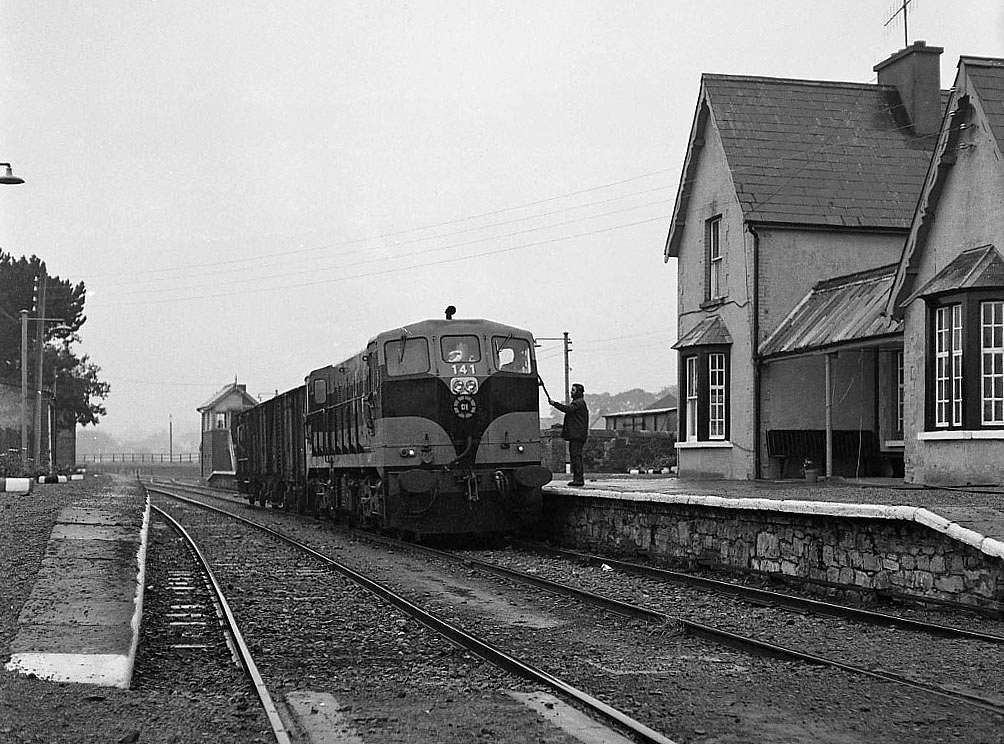
- Sligo–Limerick freight train calling at Tubbercurry in 1975

General information
- Location: Tubbercurry; Ireland
- Coordinates: 54.0515°N 8.7359°W
- Tracks: 2

Other information
- Status: Closed

History
- Opened: 1 October 1895
- Closed: 3 November 1975

Key dates
- 1963: Passenger service ended
- 1975: Freight service ended
Other services
	Proposed	
Curry	InterCity; Limerick-Sligo	Carrowmore
	Disused	
Curry	Branch Line; Collooney to Claremorris	Carrowmore
Location

Tubbercurry railway station is a disused railway station associated with the town of Tubbercurry in County Sligo, Ireland. The station was originally opened in 1895, as part of the route between Claremorris and Sligo. It was closed to passenger traffic in 1963, with goods traffic ending in 1975.

== Original route ==
The original 1895 line started at Claremorris and from there went northwards through Kiltimagh station, Swinford station, Charlestown station, Curry station, Tubbercurry, Carrowmore, Leyny and Collooney railway stations.
