= Kiltimagh railway station =

Disused train station in County Mayo, Ireland

Kiltimagh Coillte Mach
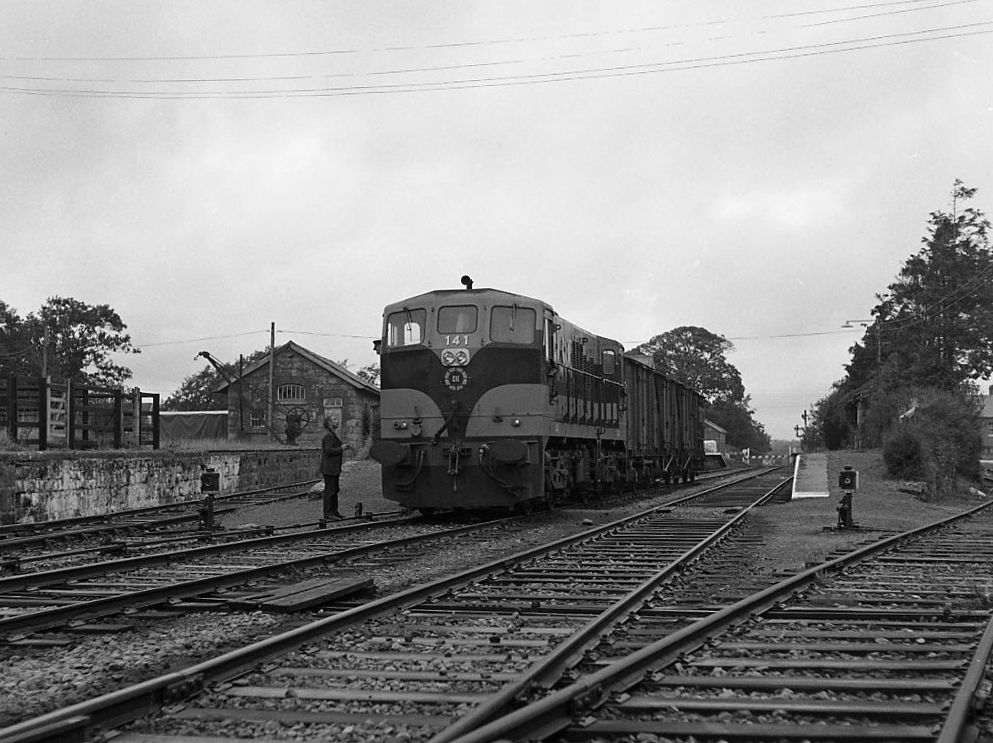
- A freight train at Kiltimagh in 1975

General information
- Location: Kiltimagh, County Mayo; Ireland
- Owner: Kiltimagh Museum
- Operator: Iarnród Éireann
- Platforms: 2

History
- Opened: 10 January 1895
- Closed: 10 January 1975

Other services
	Proposed	
Claremorris	InterCity; Limerick-Sligo	Swinford
	Disused	
Claremorris	Branch Line; Collooney to Claremorris	Swinford
Location

Kiltimagh railway station is a disused railway station close to the town of Kiltimagh in County Mayo, Ireland. The station was originally opened in 1895 as part of the route between Claremorris to the junction at Collooney railway station and onwards to the main Sligo line. The line was initially operated by the Great Southern and Western Railway and was sometimes referred to as the Burma Road.

It was finally closed to passenger traffic in 1963, with goods traffic ending in 1975.

Following its closure, the station and surrounding area was converted in the 1980s into the Kiltimagh Museum, with displays and artefacts of local history and culture.

== 21st century usage ==
=== Western rail corridor ===
From 2003 onwards, various plans have proposed the station is reopened as part of the Western Railway Corridor from Limerick to Sligo. Some of these plans also feature a railway link to Ireland West Airport.

=== Velorail ===
In 2023, a Velorail (railbike) scheme, an initiative of the IRD Kiltimagh CLG and Kiltimagh Tourism Association, was opened at the station. The track covers a refurbished 15km portion of the railway line, 9km of which is currently being used for Velorail.

== Original route (1895) ==
The original line started at Claremorris and from there went northwards through Kiltimagh railway station, Swinford railway station, Charlestown railway station, Curry railway station, Tubbercurry railway station, Carrowmore railway station, Leyny railway station and Collooney railway station.

== Accidents ==
On 19 December 1916, in foggy conditions, the driver of a ballast train failed to see a red signal at Kiltimagh station. The train, carrying a number of track workers, crashed into an empty cattle train, killing six people.
