= R320 road (Ireland) =

Road in Ireland

R320 road
- Bóthar R320
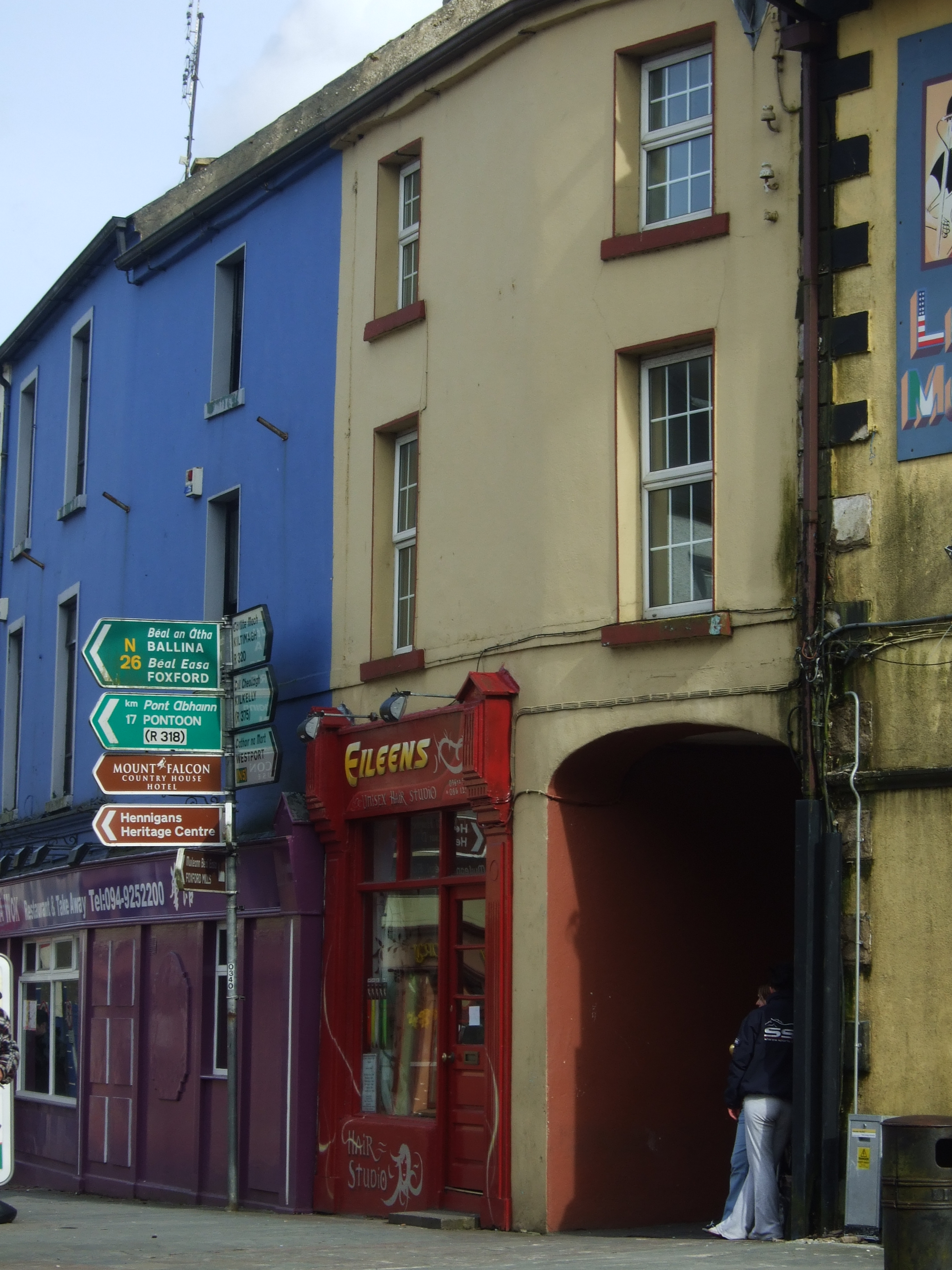
- Road signs at the junction of the N26 and R320 in Swinford

Route information
- Length: 27.1 km (16.8 mi)

Location
- Country: Ireland
- Primary destinations: County Mayo; Swinford (N26, R375); N5 road; Crosses the Killeen River; Crosses the Trimoge River; Crosses the Glore River; Kiltimagh (R321, R322, R323); R324; Crosses the Geestaun River; N60 road; Claremorris (R331); N17 road

Highway system
- Roads in Ireland; Motorways; Primary; Secondary; Regional

The R320 road is a regional road in east County Mayo in Ireland. It connects Swinford to Claremorris via Kiltimagh, and links the N5 and N26 roads near Swinford with the N60 and N17 roads near Claremorris. The R320 connects with six other regional roads along its route. The road is in three discontiguous segments which add up to 27.1 kilometres (16.8 mi) in length.

The government legislation that defines the R320, the Roads Act 1993 (Classification of Regional Roads) Order 2012 (Statutory Instrument 54 of 2012), provides the following official description:

R320: Swinford — Claremorris, County Mayo

Between its junction with N26 at Main Street Swinford and its junction with N60 at Lugatemple via Market Street and Chapel Street at Swinford; Newpark, Carrowcanada, Kinaff, Shanvally; Aiden Street, Main Street and Chapel Street at Kiltimagh; Gortgarve, Carrowreagh, Murneen and Kilcolman all in the county of Mayo

and

between its junction with N60 at Inner Relief Road and its junction with R331 at Main Street via Mount Street all in the town of Claremorris in the county of Mayo

and

between its junction with R331 at James Street in the town of Claremorris and its junction with N17 at Lisduff via Clare all in the county of Mayo.

== See also ==
- List of roads of County Mayo
- National primary road
- National secondary road
- Regional road
- Roads in Ireland
