= Curry, County Sligo =

Curry An Choraidh
- Village
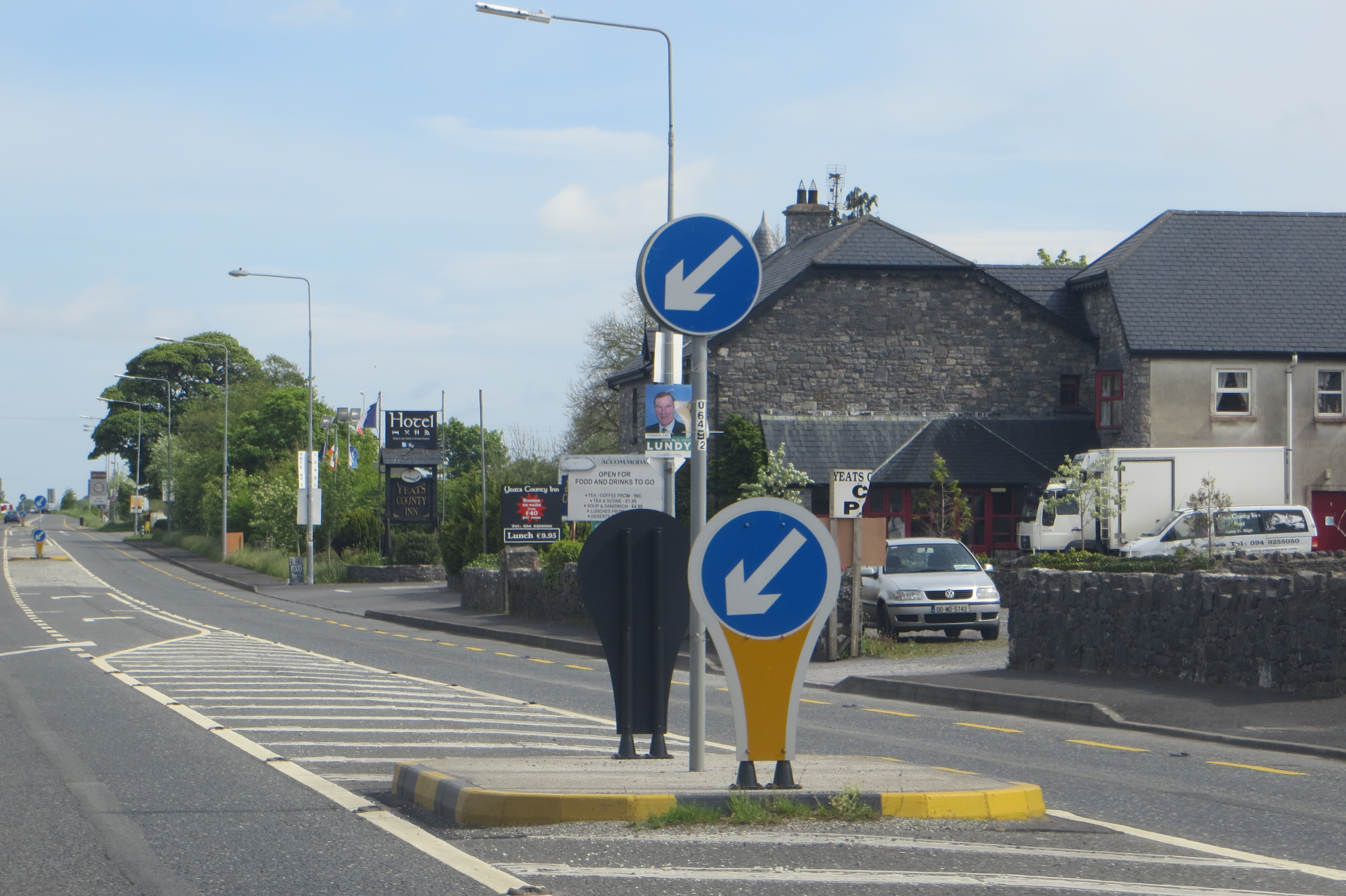
- The N17 road passes through Curry

- Location in Ireland
- Coordinates: 54.001°N 8.773°W
- Country: Ireland
- Province: Connacht
- County: County Sligo
- Time zone: UTC+0 (WET)
  - Summer (DST): UTC-1 (IST (WEST))
- Irish grid reference: G493060

Curry (Irish: An Choraidh) is a village and townland in County Sligo, Ireland. The townland has an area of approximately 3.9 square kilometres (1.5 sq mi), and had a population of 148 people as of the 2011 census.

The local Roman Catholic church (the Church of the Immaculate Conception) was built c. 1870, and the former national school (now disused) was built in 1883.

Curry had a small station on the Claremorris to Collooney line until its closure in 1963.
