= Baile na Cora =

Baile na Cora (Irish for 'town of the weir') may refer to several villages in Ireland:

- Ballinacurra, County Cork, a village in County Cork
- Ballynacarrow, a village in County Sligo
- Belcarra, County Mayo, a village in County Mayo
