= R324 road =

R324 road may refer to:

- R324 road (Ireland)
- R324 road (South Africa)
