= R322 road =

R322 road may refer to:

- R322 road (Ireland)
- R322 road (South Africa)
