= Swinford railway station =

Railway station in Ireland

Swinford Béal Átha na Muice
- CIÉ 001 Class in Swinford station in 1975 operating the Sligo-Limerick freight service

General information
- Location: Swinford, County Mayo; Ireland
- Coordinates: 53.9436°N 8.9550°W
- Lines: Waterford, Limerick and Western Railway (from 1895); Western Rail Corridor (proposed)

History
- Opened: 1895
- Closed: 1975
Location

Swinford railway station is a disused railway station in the town of Swinford, County Mayo, Ireland. It opened in 1895, and closed to passenger traffic in 1963.

== History ==
The station opened in 1895 as part of the Waterford, Limerick and Western Railway line between Claremorris and Sligo, accompanied by the construction of a double arch stone bridge to carry the railway over the Ballina road. The route of the line started at Claremorris and from there went northwards through Kiltimagh, Swinford, Charlestown, Curry, Tubbercurry, Carrowmore, Leyny and Collooney railway stations.

Swinford station closed to passenger traffic in 1963, with goods traffic ending in 1975.

In the early 21st century, the Western Railway Corridor was proposed to be rebuilt as part of the government's Transport 21 plan. This plan proposed that the line would re-open in two stages, with the first stage covering the route between Limerick and Claremorris; however only Limerick to Athenry was reopened. The second stage, currently unfunded, would see the line restored between Claremorris and Sligo, with Swinford as a potential intermediate stop.

Preceding station	Iarnród Éireann	Following station
	Proposed	
Kiltimagh	InterCity; Limerick-Sligo	Charlestown
