= Tullavilla =

Townland in County Sligo, Ireland

Coordinates: 54.0914°N 8.7891°W

Tulavilla is a townland near Tubbercurry in County Sligo, Ireland. It is a quiet rural area, at the foot of the Ox Mountains with a mainly farming community.
