= R376 road =

R376 road may refer to:

- R376 road (Ireland)
- R376 road (South Africa)
