= R375 road =

R375 road may refer to:

- R375 road (Ireland)
- R375 road (South Africa)
