= R321 road =

R321 road may refer to:

- R321 road (Ireland)
- R321 road (South Africa)
