= R322 road (Ireland) =

Regional road

R322 road
- Bóthar R322

Route information
- Length: 9.7 km (6.0 mi)

Location
- Country: Ireland
- Primary destinations: County Mayo; Kiltimagh (R320); Canbrack; Crosses the Glore River; Woodfield; Cloonturk (N17 road)

Highway system
- Roads in Ireland; Motorways; Primary; Secondary; Regional

The R322 road is a regional road in central County Mayo in Ireland. It connects the R320 road at Kiltimagh to the N17 road at Cloonturk, 9.7 kilometres (6.0 mi) away (map). The road passes just to the north of Cloonfallagh about halfway between the N17 and Kiltimagh.

The government legislation that defines the R322, the Roads Act 1993 (Classification of Regional Roads) Order 2012 (Statutory Instrument 54 of 2012), provides the following official description:

Kiltimagh – Kilkelly, County Mayo

Between its junction with R320 at Main Street Kiltimagh and its junction with N17 at Cloonturk via James Street at Kiltimagh; Canbrack and Woodfield all in the county of Mayo.

== See also ==
- List of roads of County Mayo
- National primary road
- National secondary road
- Regional road
- Roads in Ireland
