= Hollymount =

Village in County Mayo, Ireland

Hollymount Maolla
- Village
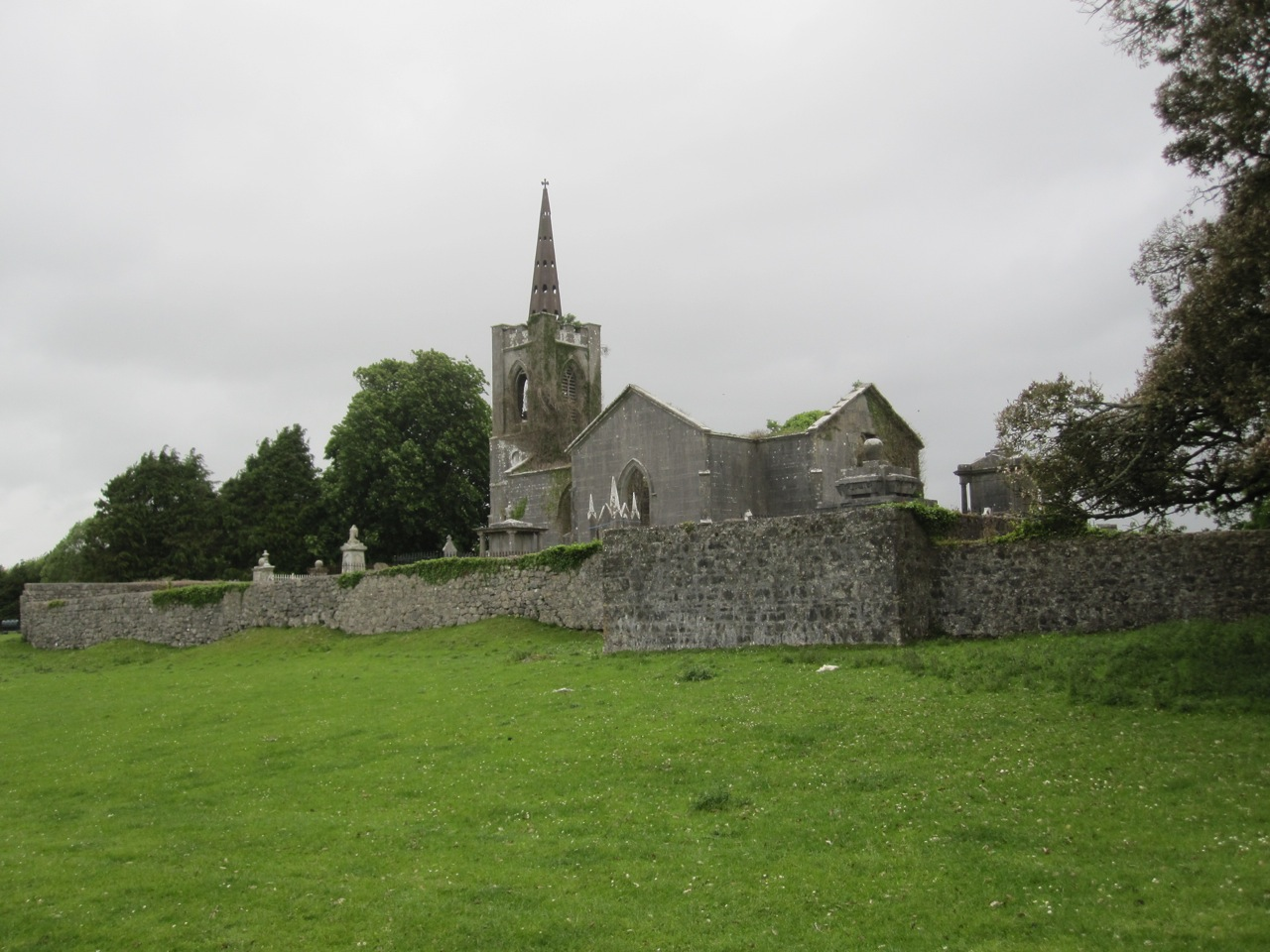
- The ruins of the Church of Saint Charles the Martyr lie to the north of Hollymount
- Interactive map of Hollymount
- Coordinates: 53°39′38″N 9°07′03″W
- Country: Ireland
- Province: Connacht
- County: County Mayo
- Elevation: 57 m (187 ft)
- Time zone: UTC+0 (WET)
  - Summer (DST): UTC-1 (IST (WEST))
- Irish Grid Reference: M262683

Hollymount (Irish: Maolla) is a village in County Mayo, Ireland. It is in the plains of south Mayo, on the R331 road midway between the towns of Ballinrobe and Claremorris. The village was named after the nearby Hollymount Estate, although the village lies largely within the townland of Kilrush.

== History ==
Hollymount Estate, for which the village is named, was acquired by John Vesey, the Church of Ireland Archbishop of Tuam in December 1698. He built a large manor house on the estate in the early 18th century.

Roman Catholic records for Hollymount commenced in 1857. Surviving Church of Ireland records commenced in 1845 and civil records commenced in 1864. Gravestone inscriptions go back to the early 18th century.

== Amenities ==
Hollymount village has a post office, a mini-mart, a community centre (Cois Abhainn), a small fuel/petrol station, health clinic and several public houses. The local Gaelic Athletic Association (GAA) club is Hollymount Carramore GAA.

== Transport ==
Hollymount railway station opened on 1 November 1892; it closed for passenger traffic on 1 June 1930; and it finally closed altogether on 1 January 1960.

It was the only stop on the branch line between Ballinrobe and Claremorris railway station.

== People ==
- Emmet Stagg, politician.
- Frank Stagg, hunger striker.
- Stephen Coen, Gaelic footballer

== See also ==
- List of towns and villages in Ireland
