= Roscommon railway station =

Railway station in Ireland

Roscommon Ros Comáin
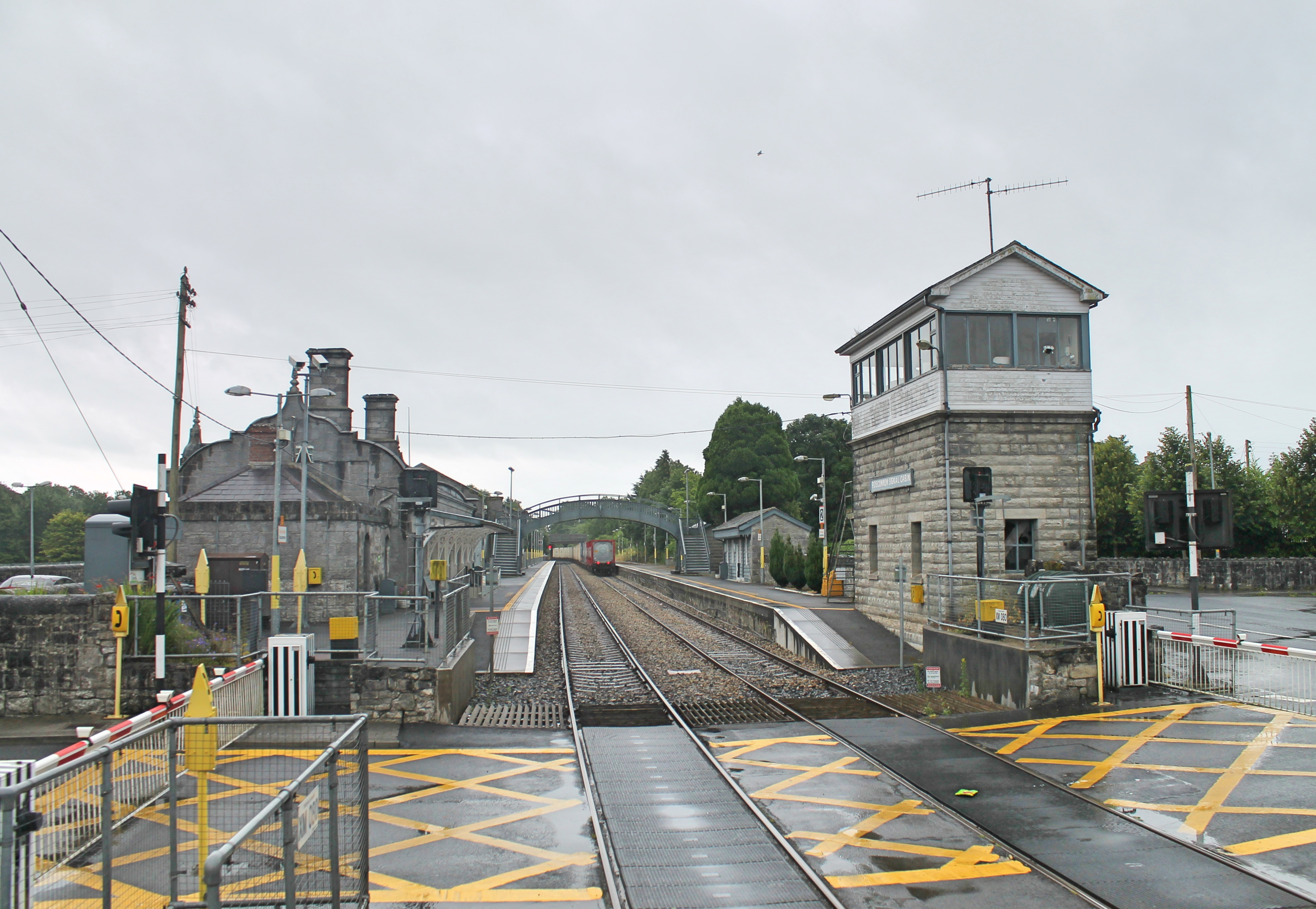

General information
- Location: Abbeytown, Roscommon; County Roscommon, F42 KF85; Ireland
- Coordinates: 53°37′27.7″N 8°11′46.7″W
- Operator: Iarnród Éireann
- Platforms: 2
- Bus operators: TFI Local Link
- Connections: 570

Construction
- Structure type: At-grade

Other information
- Station code: RSCMN

Key dates
- 1860: Station opened
Location

Roscommon railway station serves the town of Roscommon in County Roscommon, Ireland.

The station is on the Dublin to Westport Rail service. Passengers to or from Galway must travel to Athlone and change trains. Passengers to or from Ballina and Foxford will need to travel to Manulla Junction and change trains.

== History ==
The station opened on 13 February 1860.

== Services ==
As of May 2023, the typical weekday service is as follows:

- 5 trains per day to Dublin Heuston
- 5 trains per day to Westport

Preceding station	Iarnród Éireann	Following station
Athlone	InterCity; Dublin–Westport/Galway railway line	Castlerea

== See also ==
- List of railway stations in Ireland
