= Basta (company) =

Irish lock manufacturer

- Industry: Locks, Hinges, Door handles
- Founded: 1955; 71 years ago in Tubbercurry, County Sligo, Ireland
- Founder: James Gallagher
- Headquarters: Sligo
- Revenue: €3 million (2020)
- Parent: Laydex Building Solutions
- Website: bastawholesale.com

Basta is a lock manufacturer based in Ireland. It was founded by James Gallagher in Tubbercurry, County Sligo in 1955.

Basta entered examinership in July 2018. It was acquired by Desand, an Irish company, in December 2018.

In December 2020, Basta was sold to another Irish company, Laydex Building Solutions.
