= R376 road (Ireland) =

Road in Ireland

R376 road
- Bóthar R376

Route information
- Length: 1.9 km (1.2 mi)

Location
- Country: Ireland
- Primary destinations: County Mayo; Lurga Upper (N17 road); Kilgarriff West; Ireland West Airport

Highway system
- Roads in Ireland; Motorways; Primary; Secondary; Regional

The R376 road is a regional road in County Mayo in Ireland. It connects the N17 road to the entrance to Ireland West Airport, 1.9 kilometres (1.2 mi) away (map of the route).

The government legislation that defines the R376, the Roads Act 1993 (Classification of Regional Roads) Order 2012 (Statutory Instrument 54 of 2012), provides the following official description:

Lurga Upper — Knock Airport, County Mayo

Between its junction with N17 at Lurga Upper and its terminal point at the entrance to Ireland West Airport via Kilgarriff West all in the county of Mayo.

== See also ==
- List of roads of County Mayo
- National primary road
- National secondary road
- Regional road
- Roads in Ireland
