= R321 road (Ireland) =

Road in Ireland

R321 road
- Bóthar R321
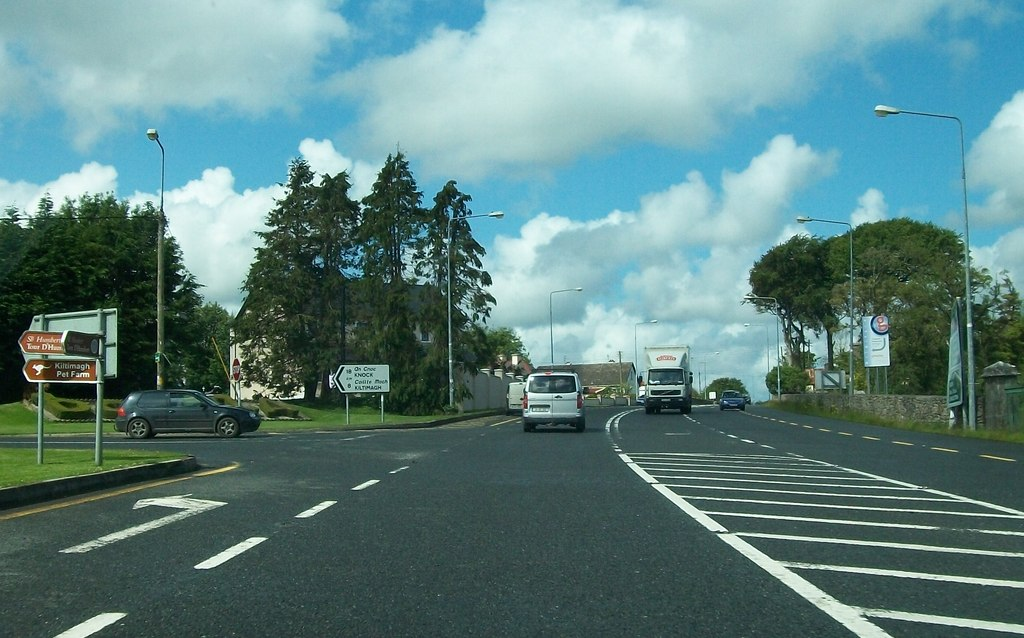
- Turnoff for R321 from N5 at Bohola

Route information
- Length: 11.5 km (7.1 mi)

Location
- Country: Ireland
- Primary destinations: County Mayo; Ballylahan (N58); Bohola (N5 road); Toocananagh (N5 road); Crosses the Pollagh River; Kiltimagh (R320)

Highway system
- Roads in Ireland; Motorways; Primary; Secondary; Regional

The R321 road is a regional road in central County Mayo in Ireland. The road is discontinuous and it connects the N58 road at Ballylahan to the N5 road near Bohola, and after a 950m hiatus, it leaves the N5 at Toocananagh and joins the R320 in Kiltimagh. The road is 11.5 kilometres (7.1 mi) long.

The government legislation that defines the R321, the Roads Act 1993 (Classification of Regional Roads) Order 2012 (Statutory Instrument 54 of 2012), provides the following official description:

Ballylahan — Bohola — Kiltimagh, County Mayo

Between its junction with N58 at Ballylahan and its junction with N5 at Bohola via Ardacarha all in the county of Mayo

and

between its junction with N5 at Toocananagh and its junction with R320 at Aiden Street, Kiltimagh via Carrowkeel and Killedan all in the county of Mayo.

== See also ==
- List of roads of County Mayo
- National primary road
- National secondary road
- Regional road
- Roads in Ireland
