= Hollymount railway station =

Station in County Mayo, Ireland

Hollymount

General information
- Location: Hollymount, County Mayo; Ireland
- Coordinates: 53.6435°N 9.1079°W

History
- Opened: 1 January 1892
- Closed: 1 January 1959

Other services
	Disused	
Claremorris	Branch Line; Claremorris to Ballinrobe	Ballinrobe
Location

Hollymount railway station was a branch on the Ballinrobe to Claremorris branch line of the Midland Great Western Railway in Hollymount, County Mayo.

The line was developed by the Ballinrobe and Claremorris Light Railway Company which had been founded in 1884 and the stop opened in 1892.

The company was absorbed into the Midland Great Western Railway in 1924.

The station closed for passenger traffic on 1 June 1930 and closed entirely in 1960.

It was the only stop on the branch line from Claremorris to Ballinrobe.

== Services ==
Preceding station	Iarnród Éireann	Following station
	Disused	
Claremorris railway station	Branch Line; Ballinrobe to Claremorris	Ballinrobe

== See also ==
- Western Railway Corridor
