= Castlerea railway station =

Railway station in Castlerea, Ireland

Castlerea An Caisleán Riabhach
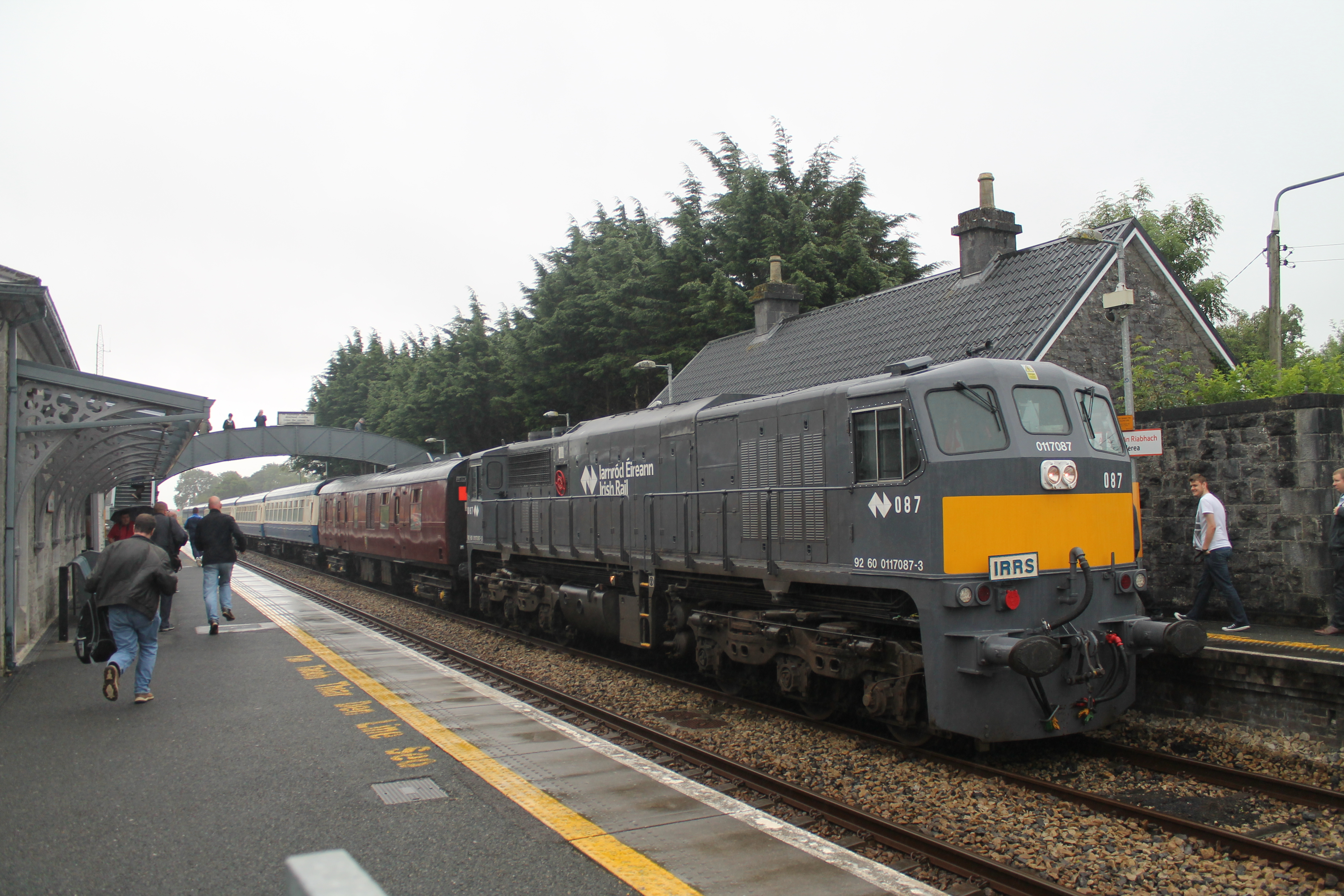

General information
- Location: Church Road, Castlerea; County Roscommon, F45 HH34; Ireland
- Coordinates: 53°45′41″N 8°29′9″W
- Owner: Iarnród Éireann
- Operator: Iarnród Éireann
- Platforms: 2
- Bus operators: Bus Eireann; TFI Local Link
- Connections: 429; 546

Construction
- Structure type: At-grade

Other information
- Station code: CSREA

Key dates
- 1860: Station opened
Location

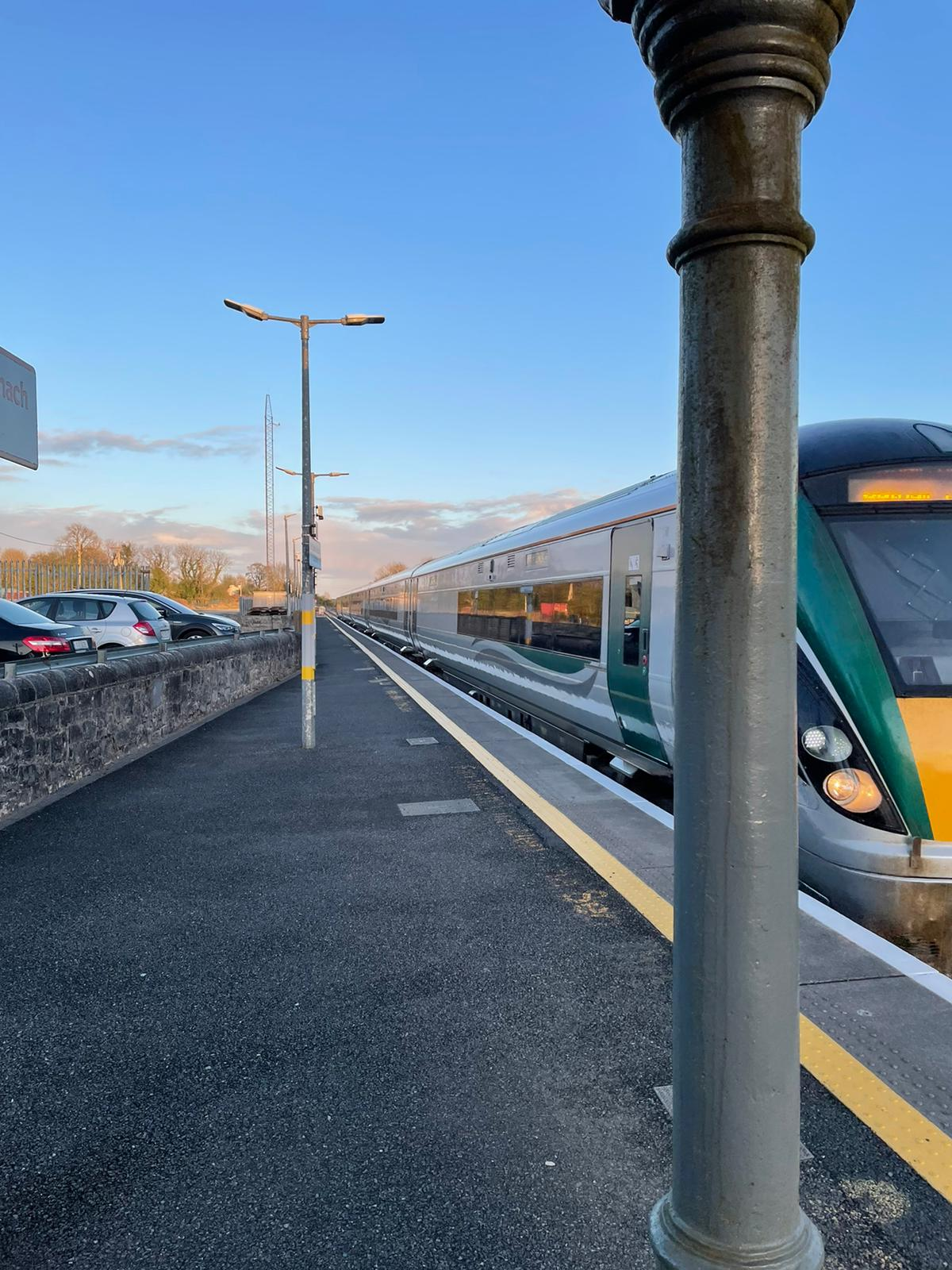
Irish Rail 22000 Class ICR at Castlerea Train Station

Castlerea railway station serves the town of Castlerea in County Roscommon, Ireland. The station opened on 15 November 1860.

The station is on the Dublin to Westport Rail service. Passengers to or from Galway must travel to Athlone and change trains. Passengers to or from Ballina and Foxford will need travel to Manulla Junction and change trains.

== Services ==
Iarnród Éireann operate the following service:

- 5 trains per day to Dublin Heuston
- 5 trains per day to Westport

Preceding station	Iarnród Éireann	Following station
Roscommon	InterCity; Dublin–Westport/Galway railway line	Ballyhaunis

== See also ==
- List of railway stations in Ireland
