= Charlestown, County Mayo =

Town in County Mayo, Ireland

Charlestown Baile Chathail
- Town
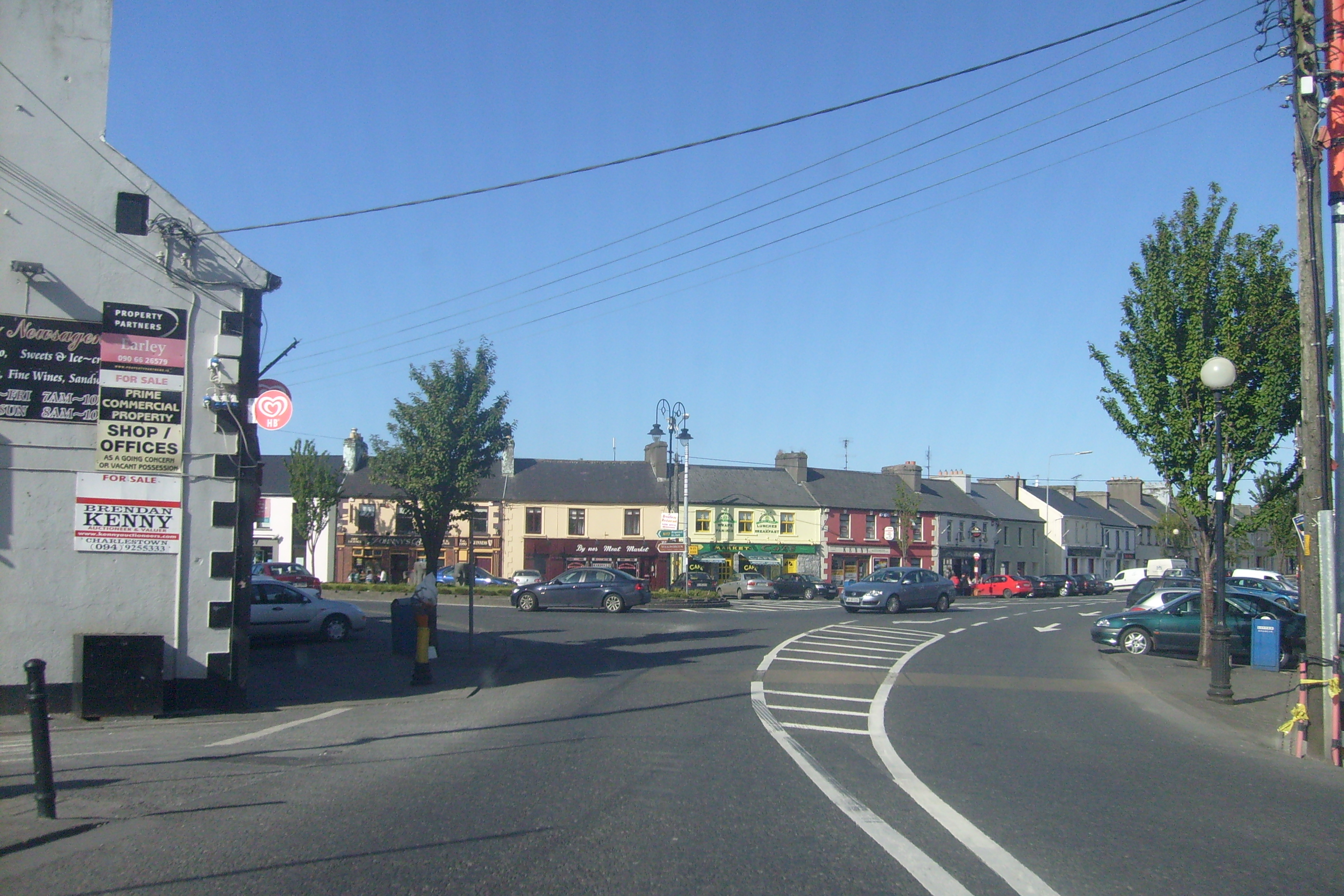
- Charlestown town centre

- Location in Ireland
- Coordinates: 53°57′51″N 8°47′39″W
- Country: Ireland
- Province: Connacht
- County: County Mayo
- Elevation: 60 m (200 ft)

Population (2022)
  - Total: 1,172
- includes Bellaghy, County Sligo
- Time zone: UTC+0 (WET)
  - Summer (DST): UTC-1 (IST (WEST))
- Irish Grid Reference: G479019
- Website: http://charlestown.ie

Charlestown (Irish: Baile Chathail) is a town in County Mayo, Ireland, on the N17 road near its junction with the N5.

== History ==
Charlestown was built in the mid-19th century on the initiative of Lord Dillon's agent, Charles Strickland, adjoining Bellaghy in County Sligo. Including Bellaghy, the town has a population of over 1,100.

There are two schools in Charlestown, St. Attracta's National School and St.Joseph's Community College.

The village was the subject of a serialised social commentary in The Irish Times by John Healy. This was later published as Death Of An Irish Town, and later republished as No One Shouted Stop! Written in 1967, it was highly critical of government policies towards rural areas, and took Charlestown as an example solely because it was the town of the author's birth.

== Sport ==
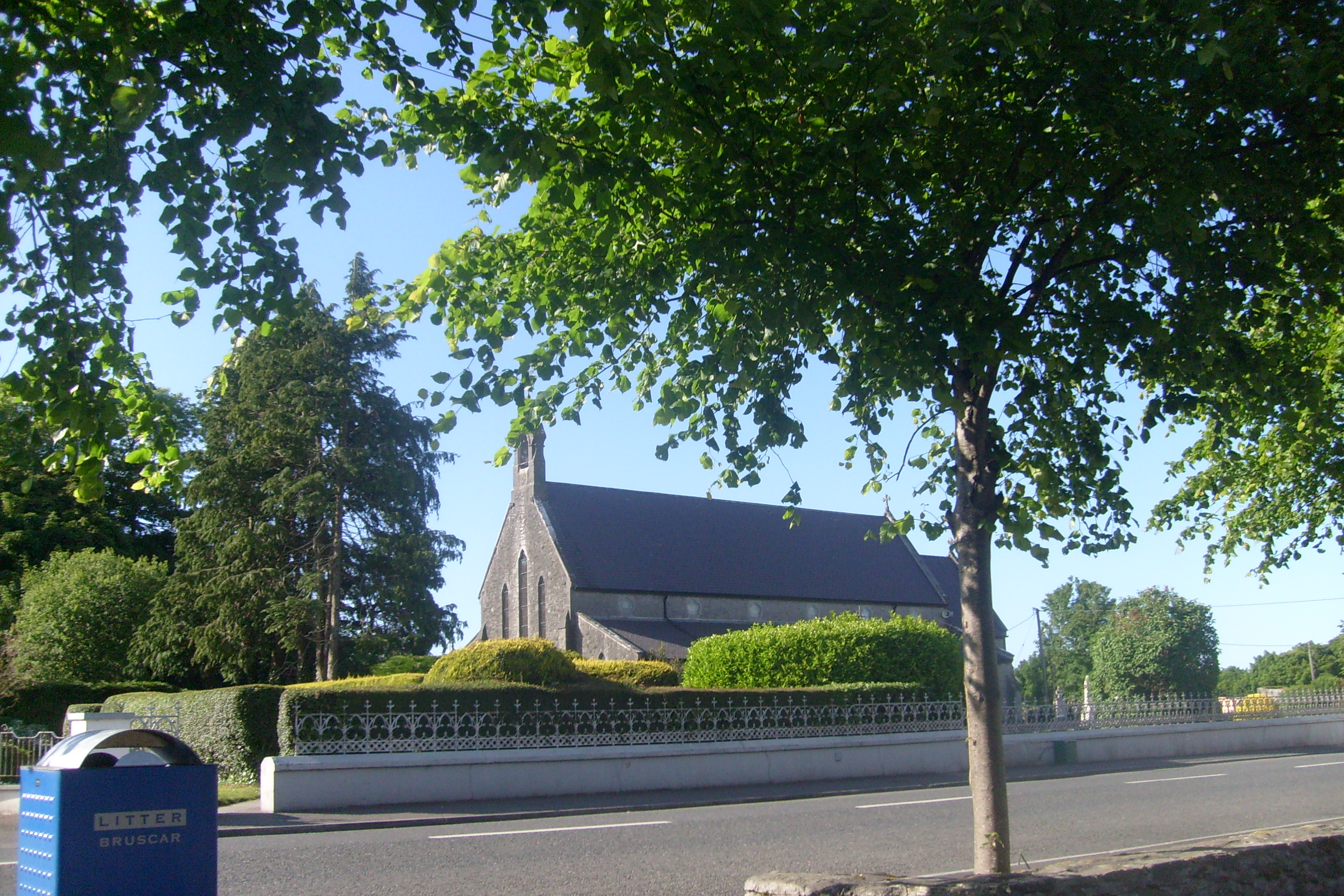
Roman Catholic church in Charlestown

Gaelic Football team Charlestown Sarsfields reached the All-Ireland club semi-final in 2001, losing out on a final spot by two points.

In 2012 the town's sporting offering was further complemented with the formation of Charlestown Amateur Boxing Club. The IABA affiliated club has since acquired numerous National and Provincial titles. Based in the old Cloonfane National School, Charlestown's boxers have been selected to represent Ireland internationally and County Mayo in inter-county competition.

== Transport ==
Trains ran through Charlestown from 1895 to 1963. The village had a station on the GS&W line from Claremorris to Collooney, part of the Western Railway Corridor. Charlestown station opened on 1 October 1895, closed for passenger traffic on 17 June 1963, and finally closed altogether on 3 November 1975. But if the Western Rail Corridor reopens from Galway onto Sligo the train service could be restored in future.

Knock Airport is 5.6 miles southwest of Charlestown. (Note: Charlestown is the nearest town to the airport with the Eircode finder giving the airport address as of May 2021 as Ireland West Airport Knock, Kilgariff, Charlestown, Co. Mayo.. note also there are multiple townlands named Kilgariff in County Mayo and this one has been also named Kilgarriff West.)

== People ==
Charlestown was the home town of Irish Times and Western People journalist John Healy, who wrote a series of articles about the town which were later turned into a book, No One Shouted Stop. The owner of the Freeman's Journal, Irish Senator Martin FitzGerald, was born on Main Street, Charlestown. Michael O'Doherty, Archbishop of Manila, was born in Charlestown. The Gallagher brothers from Oasis usually spent their summers in Charlestown with their grandparents.

Charlestown is also the hometown of Michael Ryan, executive director of the WHO Health Emergencies Programme, which is tasked with the international containment and treatment of COVID-19.

== See also ==
- List of towns and villages in Ireland
