= Ireland West Airport =

Airport in County Mayo, Ireland

Ireland West Airport Aerfort Iarthar Éireann

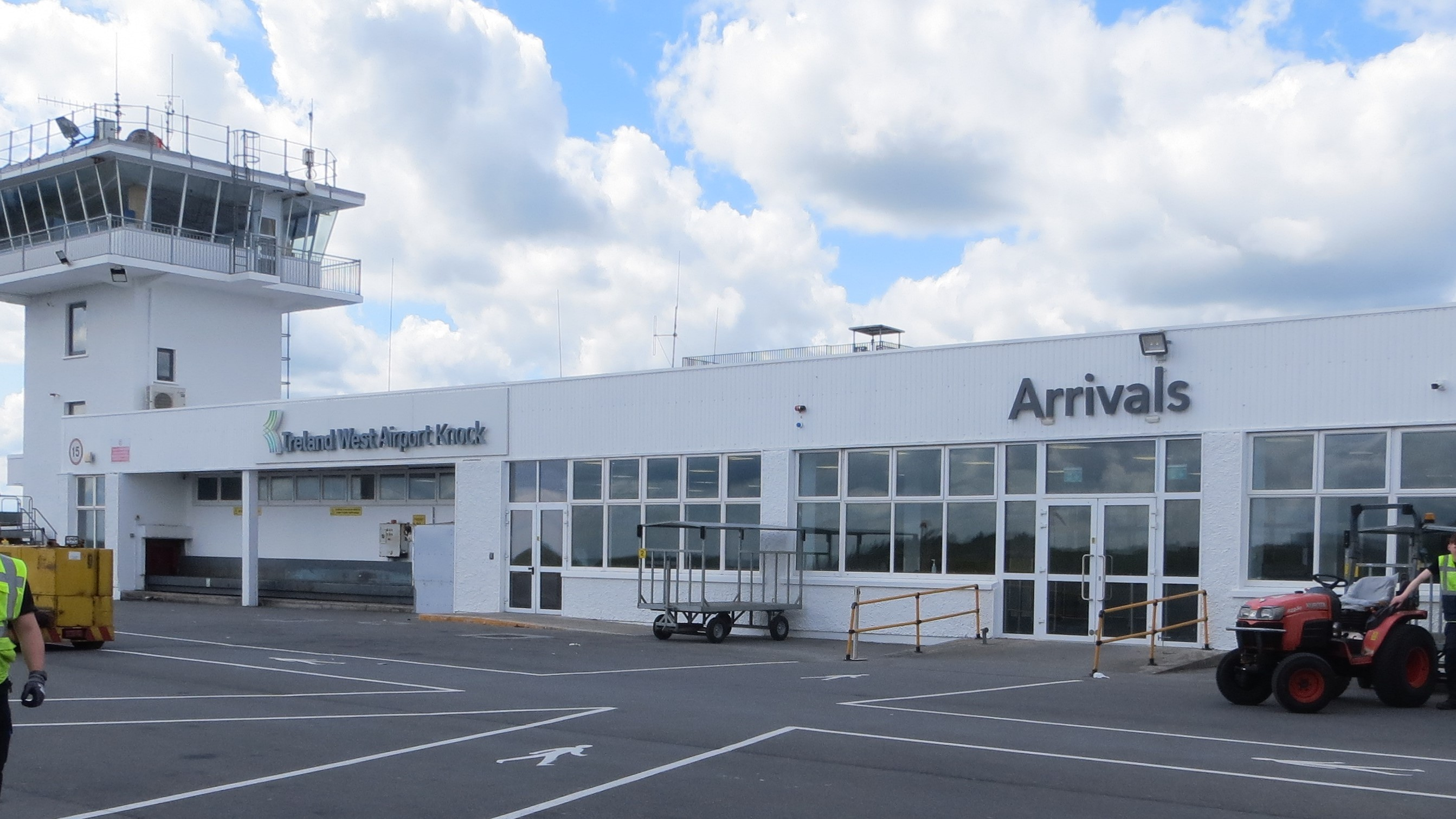
- IATA: NOC; ICAO: EIKN

Summary
- Airport type: Public
- Owner/Operator: Connacht Airport Development Company Ltd
- Serves: Connacht, Ireland
- Location: Charlestown, County Mayo
- Elevation AMSL: 665 ft (203 m)
- Coordinates: 53°54′37″N 008°49′07″W
- Website: irelandwestairport.com

Map
- Location of airport in Ireland

Runways
Direction	Length		Surface
Direction	m	ft	Surface
08/26	2,511	8,238	Asphalt

Statistics (2025)
- Passengers: 946,381
- Passenger change 2024-25: ▲13.5%
- Aircraft movements: 6,203
- Movements change 2024-25: ▲15%
- Sources: AirNav Ireland CSO

Ireland West Airport (Irish: Aerfort Iarthar Éireann) (IATA: NOC, ICAO: EIKN), officially known as Ireland West Airport Knock, and formerly known as Horan International Airport, commonly known as Knock Airport (Irish: Aerfort Chnoc Mhuire), is an international airport 5.6 km (3.5 mi) south-west of Charlestown, County Mayo, Ireland. The village of Knock is 20 km (12 mi) away. 946,000 passengers used the airport in 2025, making it the fourth-busiest in Ireland (after Dublin, Cork and Shannon).

== History ==
=== Foundation and early years ===
The airport opened on 25 October 1985 with three Aer Lingus charter flights to Rome: the official opening was on 30 May 1986. The site, on a hill in boggy terrain, was thought by many to be unrealistic, but the airport was built following a long and controversial campaign by Monsignor James Horan, the story of which has even inspired a musical. The primary motivation for building it was to attract pilgrims to Knock Shrine. Despite criticisms that the site was too boggy and too foggy, Horan delivered an airport within five years, primarily financed by a Government grant of £9.8 million. He died shortly after the opening of the airport, and his funeral was held at the then-named Horan International Airport. In recent times, Horan has been celebrated with a bronze statue erected at the airport.

The first scheduled service to Knock was a Ryanair flight from London in December 1986, operated with an HS 748 dubbed Spirit of Monsignor Horan.

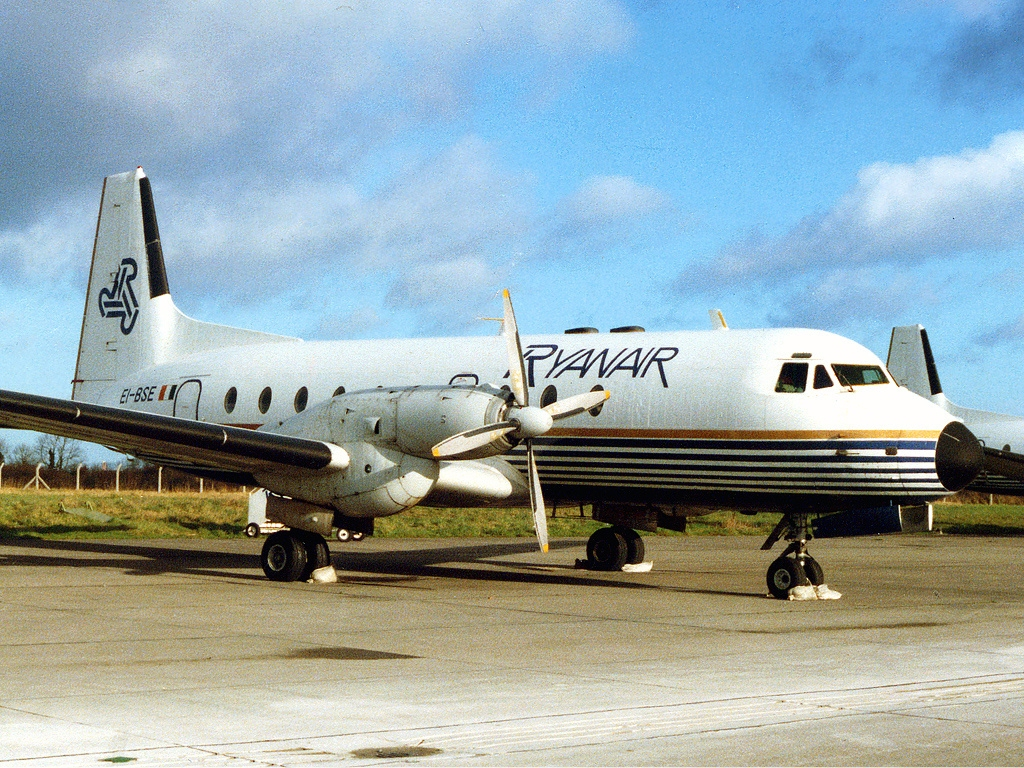
The Ryanair HS748 that operated the first scheduled service at Knock

By 1988, over 100,000 passengers had passed through. Aer Lingus commenced flights from the airport to Birmingham in 1995.

=== Development since the 2000s ===
Since 2003, flag-carrier, low-cost and regional airlines including Aer Lingus, MyTravelLite, Bmibaby, Ryanair, Aer Arann, flybe, Lufthansa and EasyJet have added routes to Great Britain and mainland Europe. Not all have proven successful, but by 2005 the airport was handling 500,000 passengers per annum.

It was voted Ireland's best regional airport in 2006 and 2009 by the Chambers of Commerce of Ireland. 2007 was a notable year, with scheduled transatlantic services to New York and Boston commencing in May, operated by the now-defunct Flyglobespan.

A record 629,000 passengers used the airport in 2008, a 13% rise compared to the previous year. The installation of the Category II Instrument Landing System in April 2009 has resulted in a significant reduction in the number of flight diversions to other airports due to poor visibility – the airport is 200 metres above sea level. August 2009 was the busiest month for three years, with 81,000 passengers: 28 August was the busiest day in the airport's history, with over 4,500 passengers.

In 2011, the month of August was the busiest in the airport's history with 84,052 passengers. 2011 was the most successful year to date with 654,553 passengers. The year saw the commencement of routes to Lanzarote, Tenerife and Gran Canaria operated by Ryanair and to Edinburgh operated by flybe. During September 2011 Ryanair celebrated its four-millionth passenger through the airport, while Lufthansa announced it would be commencing weekly flights to Düsseldorf in May 2012. In November 2011, Ryanair announced flights to Beauvais-Tillé, Frankfurt-Hahn, Bergamo-Orio al Serio and Girona-Costa Brava from March 2012. In January 2012 the 20th scheduled route was announced—flybe to Leeds, its third from the airport, from March 2012. Budget carrier BmiBaby announced in May 2012 that it was to axe its only route to Birmingham from 10 June, owing to the airline's takeover by IAG. Flights to Beauvais-Tillé and Frankfurt-Hahn have since ended.

In 2013, Ryanair launched a weekly summer route to Málaga on Thursdays. Aer Lingus Regional, which took over the Birmingham route operating a daily service using ATR 72s ended service on 26 October. Flybe began four-times-weekly flights on the route on 27 October. On 31 October 2013, in response to the scrapping of the Irish travel tax, Ryanair unveiled three new routes from Knock to Glasgow-Prestwick, Kaunas and Eindhoven. However, these routes had all been withdrawn by the fourth quarter of 2014.

It was announced in November 2017 that €15 million would be invested in improving and upgrading the airport in 2018 and 2019, to coincide with strong passenger growth. These plans include upgrading of car parks, passenger facilities, the terminal and resurfacing of the runway.

== Government assistance ==
The building of the airport was primarily financed by Government grants totaling IR£9.858 million. The completion of the airport was funded by a IR£1.3 million grant from the European Union, payable on condition that the airport developers provided an equal sum from their own resources.

On 21 February 2007, the Government of Ireland announced that it was making a €27 million capital grant. The airport stated that it would continue the implementation of its €46 million infrastructural investment programme with over €20 million of spend anticipated for 2008. Work commenced on a number of significant civil and building projects in this year. A €5.5 million extension to the terminal building was completed in April 2009. The implementation of Category II Instrument Landing System (CAT II ILS) on runway 27, to enhance reliability in low visibility, has been completed and approved. An extension to the Runway End Safety Areas (RESAs) and runway turnpad was completed in March 2009.

Departing passengers aged 12 years and over pay a "Development Fee" of €10. The fee is a critical contribution to the ongoing sustainability of the airport and provides a vital funding source to support the ongoing development works of the airport.

In 2005, the airport changed its name to Ireland West Airport Knock. As of August 2009, the Aeronautical Information Publication, including the aeronautical charts available at European Organisation for the Safety of Air Navigation, showed it as Ireland West.

== Operations ==
Ireland West Airport is home to EirTrade Aviation LTD which is Ireland's only aircraft teardown facility. The main head office is based in Dublin while teardown and maintenance opperations happen at Ireland West Airport. EirTrade is situated on apron Bravo which has the capabilities to park up to 10 narrow body aircraft. EirTrade provides Line maintenance services to airlines and opperators that use the airport.

== Corporate affairs ==
The airport is owned and operated by Connaught Airport Development Company Ltd – a private company 82.5% owned by The Horan Airport Trust. The remaining 17.5% is owned by seven local authorities – Donegal County Council, Galway County Council, Galway City Council, Leitrim County Council, Mayo County Council, Roscommon County Council and Sligo County Council.

== Airlines and destinations ==
The following airlines operate scheduled and charter flights to and from Ireland West Airport:

Airlines	Destinations
Aer Lingus	London–Heathrow
Ryanair	Birmingham, East Midlands, Edinburgh, Lanzarote, Liverpool, London–Luton, London–Stansted, Málaga, Manchester, Tenerife–South; Seasonal: Alicante, Bergamo, Bristol, Cologne/Bonn, Faro, Girona, Palma de Mallorca
SkyAlps	Seasonal charter: Groningen (begins 26 April 2027)

== Statistics ==
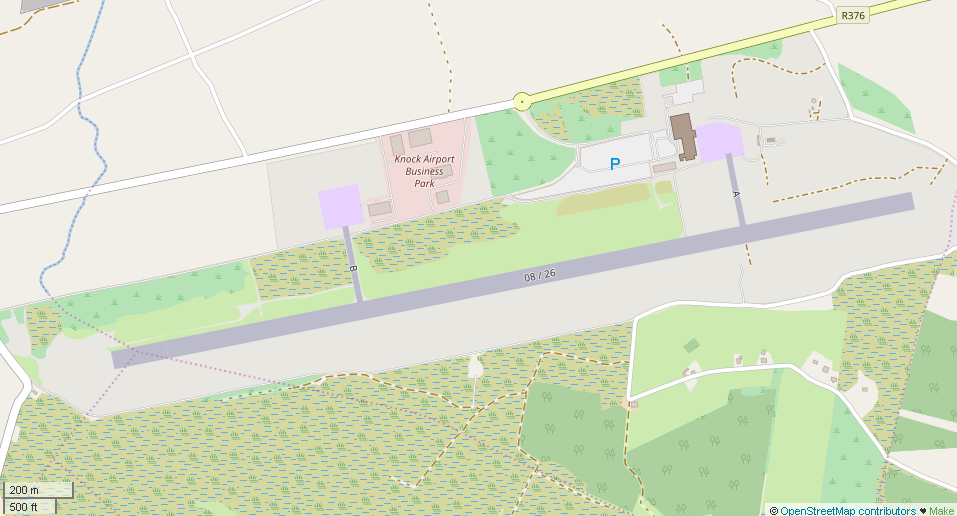
Map of Ireland West Airport

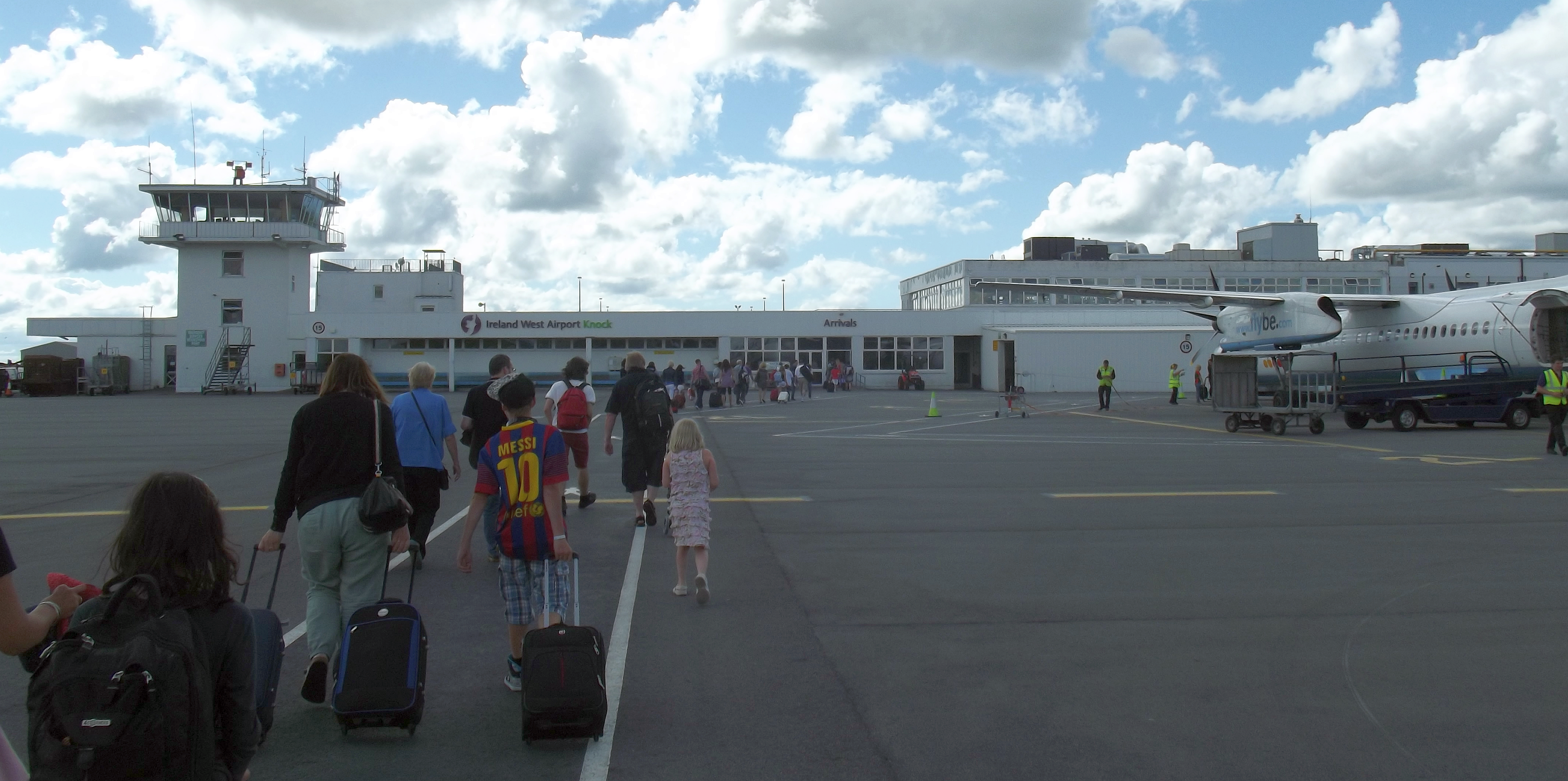
Apron view

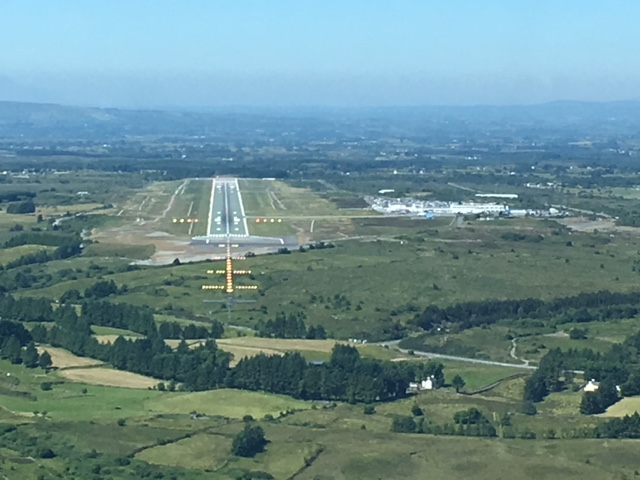
Aerial view

=== Passenger numbers ===
Year	Passenger numbers	% change (year on year)
1998	186,689	
1999	197,358	▲5.7
2000	173,421	▼12.1
2001	203,000	▲17.1
2002	199,000	▼2.0
2003	247,000	▲24.1
2004	373,000	▲51.0
2005	530,084	▲42.1
2006	621,171	▲17.2
2007	556,357	▼10.4
2008	629,000	▲13.1
2009	607,228	▼3.5
2010	589,180	▼3.0
2011	654,553	▲11.1
2012	677,368	▲3.5
2013	665,558	▼1.7
2014	703,318	▲5.7
2015	684,671	▼2.7
2016	734,031	▲7.2
2017	749,499	▲2.1
2018	771,619	▲3.0
2019	805,443	▲4.4
2020	142,532	▼82.3
2021	174,027	▲22.1
2022	722,000	▲314.9
2023	818,000	▲13.3
2024	834,000	▲2.0
2025	946,381	▲13.5

=== Busiest routes ===
10 busiest international routes at Ireland West Airport (2024)
Rank	Airport	Passengers handled	% change 2023/24
1	London–Stansted	145,249	▼6.4
2	London–Luton	140,615	▲7.8
3	Liverpool	113,055	▲12.0
4	London-Heathrow	90,202	▲36.9
5	East Midlands	42,142	▼2.7
6	Manchester	37,492	▼1.7
7	Birmingham	35,279	▼9.3
8	Edinburgh	35,146	▼19.0
9	Faro	28,597	▼4.9
10	Bristol	24,367	▼29.6
^{Source: Central Statistics Office}

== Ground transport ==
=== Road ===
The airport is near the N17 road, about halfway between Galway and Sligo. It is also close to the N5 Westport to Longford road. Over 1,500 short-term and long-term parking spaces are available at the airport.

The nearest large towns, Castlebar and Ballina, are both 38 kilometres (24 mi) distant, while Sligo is 54 km (34 mi) from the airport. Galway is 89 km (55 mi) away and Dublin is 220 km (140 mi) from the airport.

=== Bus ===
Bus Éireann airport services:

- Route 64: Galway – Derry
- Route 440: Athlone – Westport

=== Train ===
The nearest railway stations, accessible by taxi and bus include:

- Ballyhaunis – 22 km (13.67 mi)
- Foxford – 27 km (16.78 mi)
- Claremorris – 31 km (19.26 mi)
- Ballymote – 33 km (20.51 mi)

The proposed reopening of the Western Rail Corridor from Claremorris to Sligo would provide closer railway access to the airport, with the disused Charlestown station just over 5 minutes away by road.

=== Taxi ===
Ireland West Airport is serviced by licensed hackneys located outside arrivals.

=== Car hire ===
A number of international car rental companies offer rental facilities at Ireland West Airport including Budget, Avis, Europcar and Hertz.

== Incidents and accidents ==
On 20 December 2005, a cargo aircraft bound for Knock was forced to divert to Sligo due to adverse weather conditions. On landing in Sligo, the aircraft veered to the left and ran onto the grass area. The pilot managed to steer the aircraft back onto the runway. The left main wheel of the aircraft was damaged in the incident.

On 22 August 2006, an aircraft that was practicing flying instrument approaches rolled more than 90° to the right. The pilot attempted to recover by rolling the aircraft the full 360°. The aircraft fell quickly towards the ground, but ultimately landed safely, although it was "probably damaged beyond economic repair".

On 11 May 2008, a light aircraft experienced engine problems shortly after take-off from Knock and attempted to return. The engine failed and a forced landing was attempted. The aircraft landed at a steep angle, and the pilot was killed and the passenger was seriously injured.

== In popular culture ==
The construction of the airport is the subject of "Knock Song", by Irish folk singer-songwriter Christy Moore, and a documentary entitled "On a Wing and a Prayer". The musical "On a Wing and a Prayer" also deals with the life and times of Monsignor Horan, focusing on his efforts to get the airport built. It premièred in The Royal Theatre, Castlebar, on 25 November 2010.

The airport was used in the film Wild Mountain Thyme in October 2019.
