= Ballynacarrow =

Village in County Sligo, Ireland

Ballynacarrow Baile na Cora
- Village
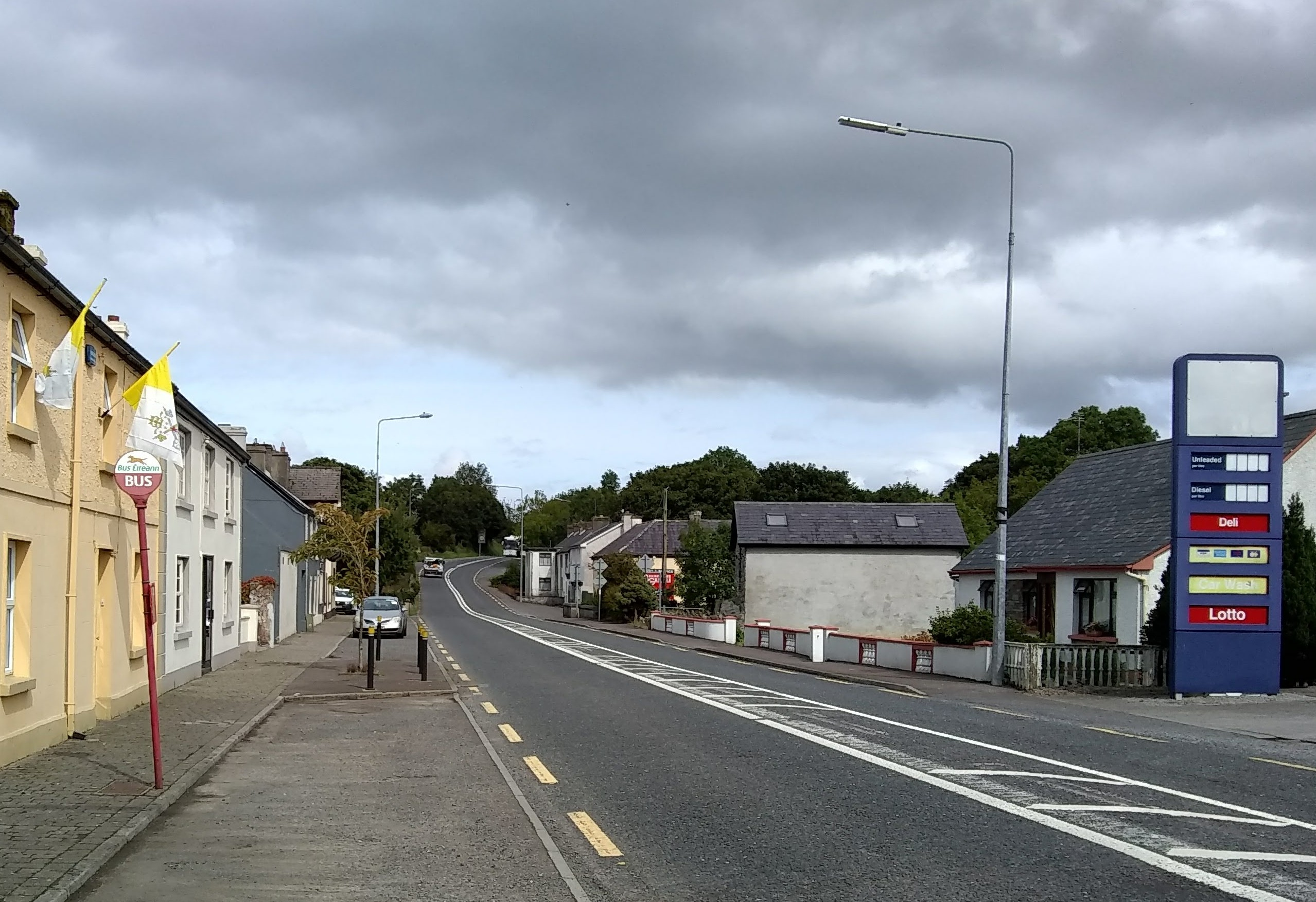
- The N17 passes through Ballynacarrow

- Location in Ireland
- Coordinates: 54°08′02″N 8°33′40″W
- Country: Ireland
- Province: Connacht
- County: County Sligo
- Elevation: 64 m (210 ft)

Population (2022)
  - Total: 220
- Irish Grid Reference: G633206

Ballynacarrow, locally Ballinacarrow (Irish: Baile na Cora), is a village in County Sligo, Ireland. It is located approximately 19 kilometres (12 mi) south-west of Sligo town. The Temple House estate is south of the village.

Ballynacarrow was designated as a census town by the Central Statistics Office for the first time in the 2016 census, at which time it had a population of 202 people.

== Transport ==
Ballynacarrow is on the N17 Galway to Collooney road. The village is a stop on the Bus Éireann Galway to Derry Expressway route 64.

== Notable people ==
The Irish-American orator and politician Bourke Cockran was born in Ballynacarrow in 1854.

== See also ==
- List of towns and villages in Ireland
