= Sligo Mac Diarmada railway station =

Irish railway station

Sligo Mac Diarmada Mac Diarmada, Sligeach
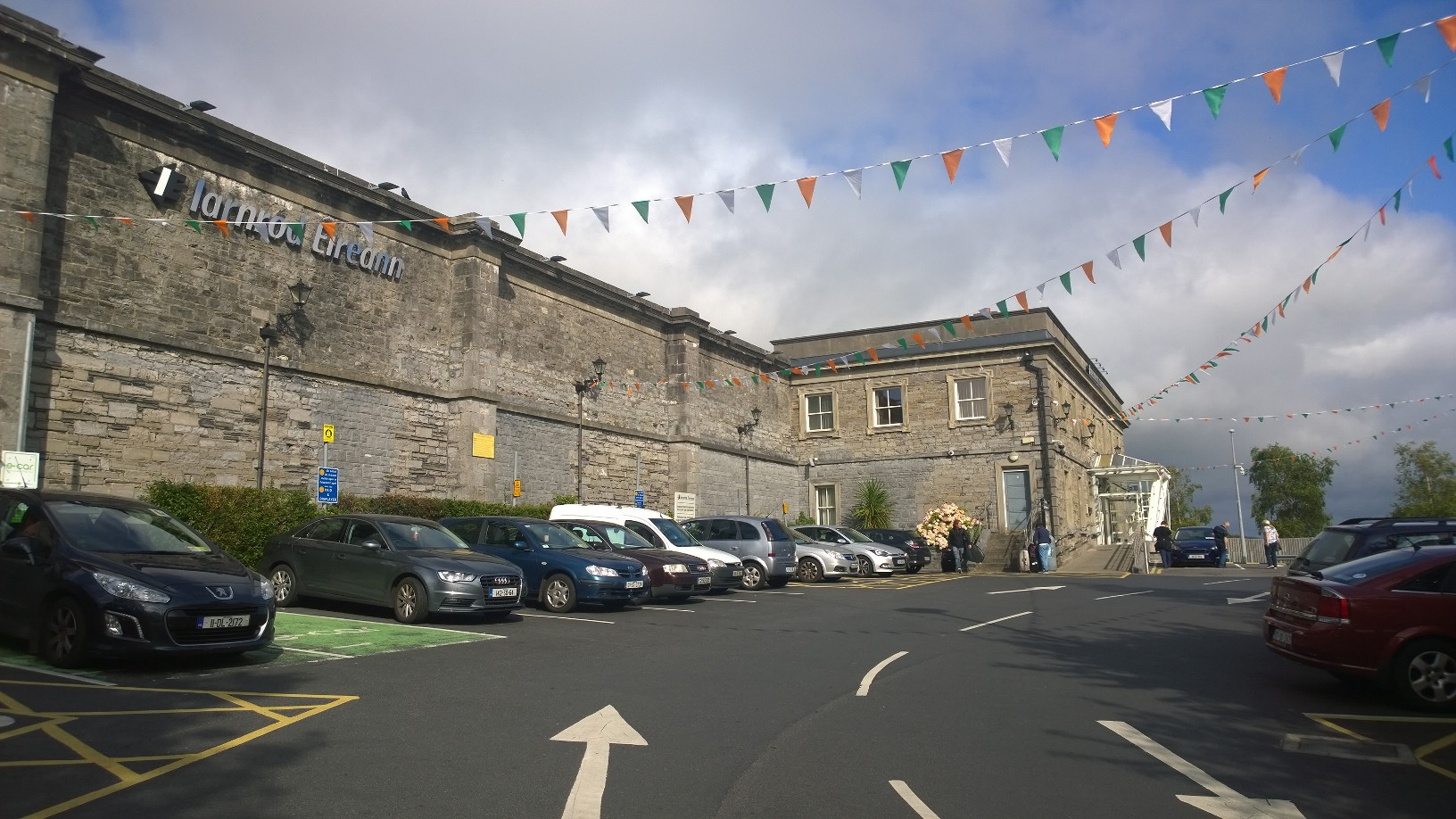
- Sligo station

General information
- Location: Knappagh Road, Sligo; County Sligo, F91 K752; Ireland
- Coordinates: 54.272°N 8.481°W
- Owner: Iarnród Éireann
- Operator: Iarnród Éireann
- Platforms: 2
- Bus operators: Bus Eireann; TFI Local Link
- Connections: 23; 64; 458; 462; 469; 470; 479; 480; 483; 566; 572; 977; 981; 982; S2

Construction
- Structure type: At-grade
- Architect: John Skipton Mulvany

Other information
- Station code: SLIGO
- Fare zone: R

History
- Opened: 3 December 1862

Key dates
- 1966: Renamed to Mac Diarmada Station
Location

Sligo railway station, also known as MacDiarmada station (Irish: Stáisiún Mhic Dhiarmada), is a mainline railway station which serves the town of Sligo in County Sligo, Ireland. It is a terminal station which now has two platforms and an intermediate carriage siding. The railway at the station is elevated above the surrounding streets and the station building dominates its surrounds. There is a passing loop at the approach to the station. It is named after Irish patriot Seán Mac Diarmada. Iarnród Éireann, Ireland's national railway operator, runs inter-city rail services between Sligo and Dublin on the Dublin-Sligo railway line.

== History ==
The station was designed by architect John Skipton Mulvany and opened on 3 December 1862, when the Midland Great Western Railway extended their Longford branch to Sligo, adding rail links to the town from Dublin. The Sligo, Leitrim and Northern Counties Railway linked to Enniskillen to the north in 1881 and the Waterford and Limerick Railway (later the Great Southern and Western Railway) followed with a link to Limerick and the south in 1895. The line to Enniskillen closed in 1957 and passenger services to Limerick closed in 1963.

The station building was burned down and destroyed on 11 January 1923 during the Irish Civil War. Seven engines were sent down the line to the quay and one crashed through a concrete wall into the harbour.

The station formerly had two intermediate carriage sidings rather than one. The southern platform was previously shorter and included a small bay platform. There was a depot previously to the south of the line to the east of the station, the building is now demolished. The turntable was used for turning steam locomotives and later proved useful for turning 121 Class single cabbed diesel locomotives.

In September 2026, it was reported that Iarnród Éireann was willing to refurbish the station roof, which has fallen into disrepair, and reinstate the second platform, but that any works would be contingent on government funding that had not yet been secured.

=== Naming ===
In 1966, Sligo railway station was renamed Mac Diarmada Station after Irish rebel Seán Mac Diarmada from County Leitrim.

== Rail Freight ==
In 1862, Midland Great Western Railway built a short branch to serve Sligo Quay Freight Terminal. The line curves off to the north and downward just before the station. The facility includes a large crane for handling containers, which was built in the mid 1970s by CIÉ. The last freight train left Sligo Quay in December 2008. No railfreight trains currently serve the terminal.

On December 1, 2021, the IÉ Rail Freight 2040 strategy was released. Sligo station was named as one of the future Tactical Rail Freight Terminals (TRFTs), alongside Galway and Cork. It will serve local areas and facilitate regional access to rail freight.

== Connections ==
Sligo bus station is at street level adjacent to south side of the station.

Preceding station	Iarnród Éireann	Following station
Collooney	InterCity; Dublin-Sligo	Terminus
	Proposed	
Collooney	InterCity; Limerick-Sligo	Terminus

== Gallery ==
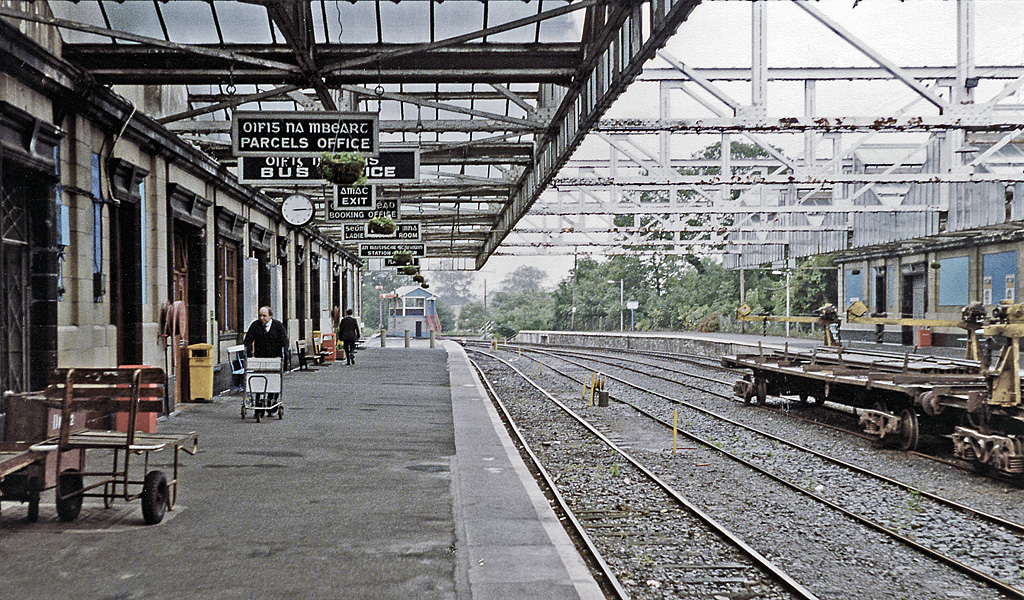
Sligo Station in 1993

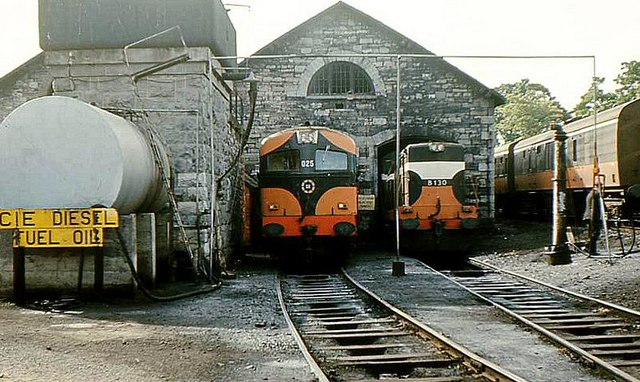
Sligo station engine shed which has now been demolished

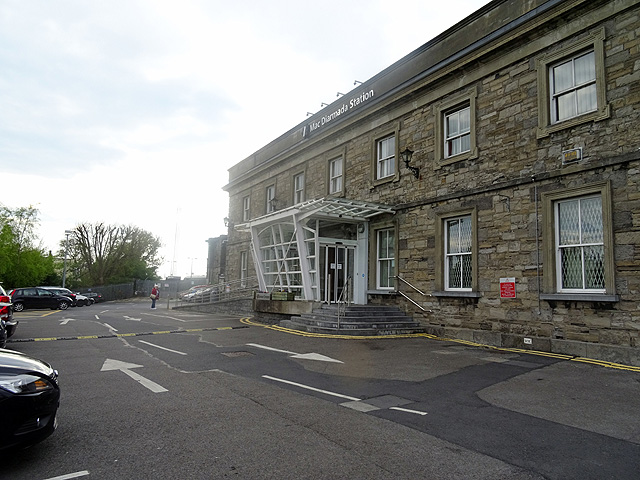
Station entrance 2016

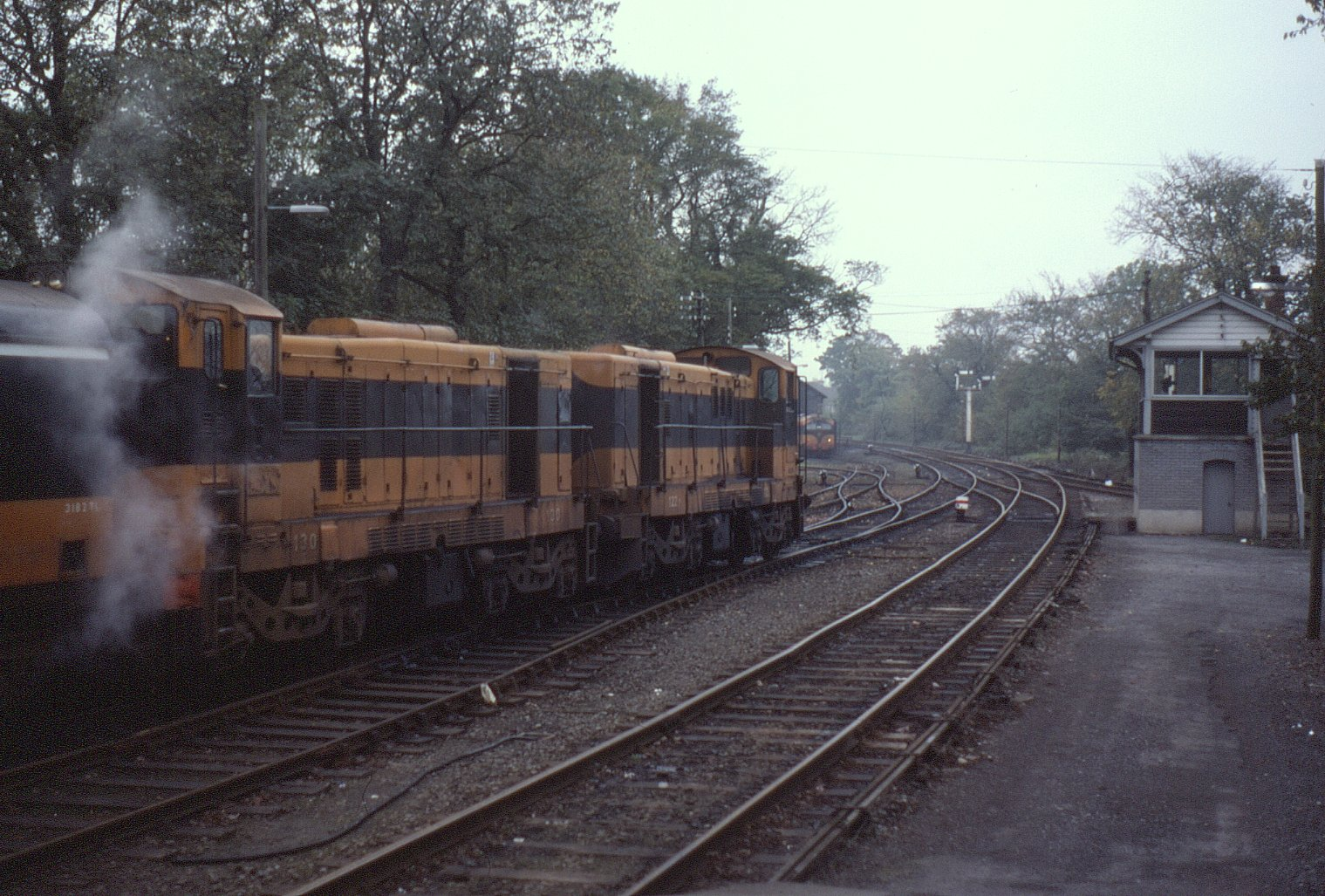
Leaving Sligo in 1985. The locomotive shed is behind the distant locomotive, the line behind the signal box leads to the quay

== See also ==
- List of railway stations in Ireland
