= Ballyhaunis railway station =

Railway station in Ballyhaunis, County Mayo, Ireland

Ballyhaunis Béal Átha hAmhnais
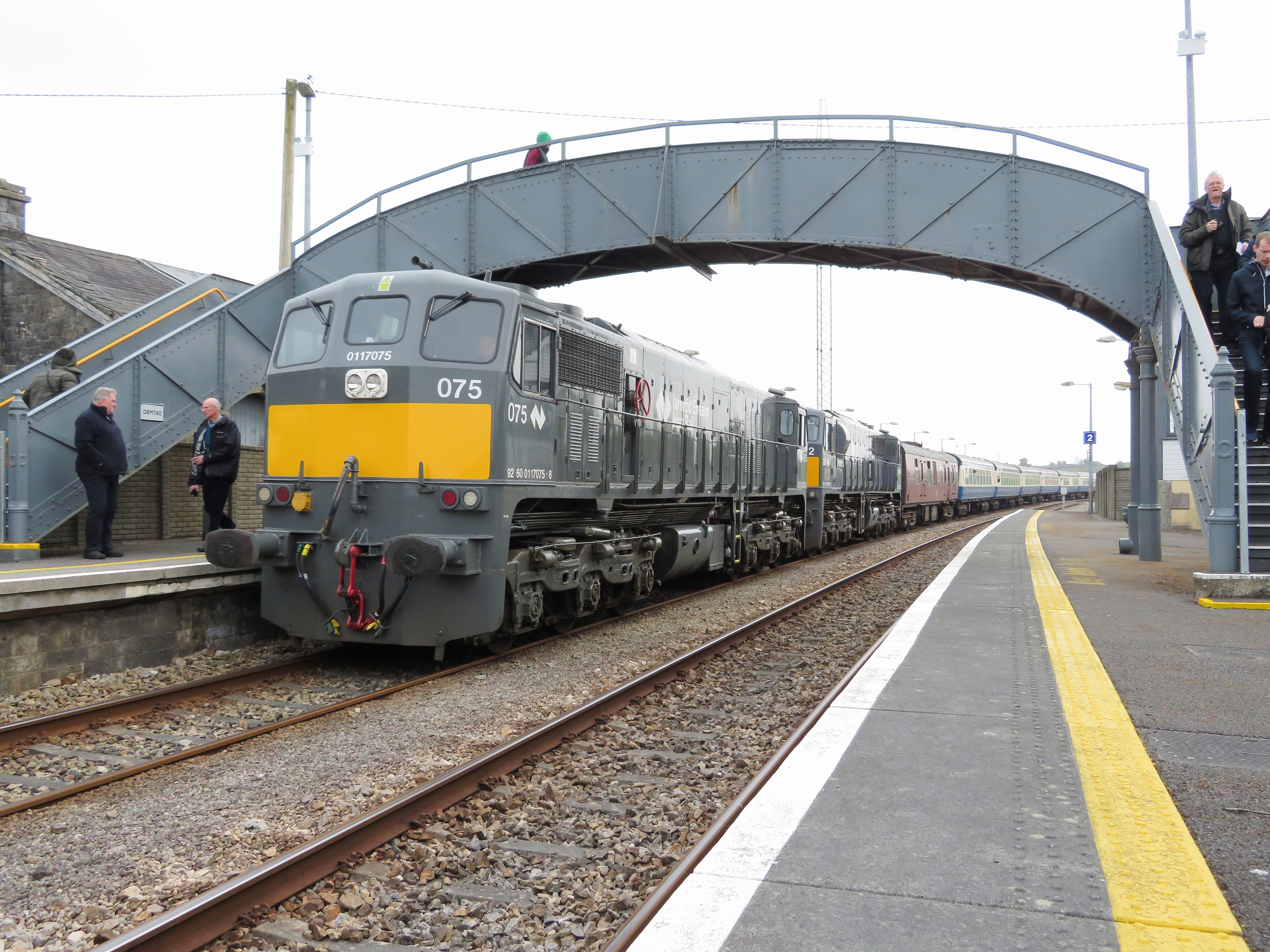

General information
- Location: Devlis, Ballyhaunis, County Mayo, F35 NX61; Ireland
- Coordinates: 53.761631°N 8.758509°W
- Owner: Iarnród Éireann
- Operator: Iarnród Éireann
- Platforms: 2

Construction
- Structure type: At-grade

Other information
- Station code: BYHNS

History
- Opened: 1861

Services
| Preceding station | Iarnród Éireann | Following station |
|---|---|---|
| Castlerea | InterCity; Dublin–Westport/Galway railway line | Claremorris |
Location

Ballyhaunis railway station serves the town of Ballyhaunis in County Mayo, Ireland.

The station is on the Dublin to Westport Rail service. Passengers to or from Galway will need to travel to Athlone and change trains. Passengers to or from Ballina and Foxford must travel to Manulla Junction and change trains.

== History ==
The station opened on 1 October 1861 (although some sources list 9 September 1861) and its 150th anniversary was celebrated in 2011 by a Ballyhaunis Railway Station-themed edition of the local annual Annagh Magazine.

Passenger traffic through the station increased notably in the form of pilgrims following the claim in 1879 that there had been an apparition of the Blessed Virgin Mary, Saint Joseph, Saint John the Evangelist and Jesus Christ (as the Lamb of God) in the nearby town of Knock.

== Services ==
Iarnród Éireann operate the following service:

- 5 trains per day to Dublin Heuston
- 5 trains per day to Westport

== See also ==
- List of railway stations in Ireland
