= R375 road (Ireland) =

Road in Ireland

R375 road
- Bóthar R375

Route information
- Length: 11 km (6.8 mi)

Location
- Country: Ireland
- Primary destinations: County Mayo; Swinford (R320); Kilbride; Derryronun; Kilkelly; Crosses the Trimoge River; Liscosker (N17 road)

Highway system
- Roads in Ireland; Motorways; Primary; Secondary; Regional

The R375 road is a regional road in central County Mayo in Ireland. It connects the R320 road at Swinford to the N17 road at Liscosker, 11 kilometres (6.8 mi) away (map).

The government legislation that defines the R375, the Roads Act 1993 (Classification of Regional Roads) Order 2012 (Statutory Instrument 54 of 2012), provides the following official description:

Swinford — Kilkelly, County Mayo

Between its junction with R320 at Market Street Swinford and its junction with N17 at Liscosker via Davitt Place and Park Road at Swinford; Kilbride, Derryronun and Kilkelly all in the county of Mayo.

== See also ==
- List of roads of County Mayo
- National primary road
- National secondary road
- Regional road
- Roads in Ireland
