= Tubbercurry =

Town in County Sligo, Ireland

Tobercurry Tobar an Choire (Irish)
- Town
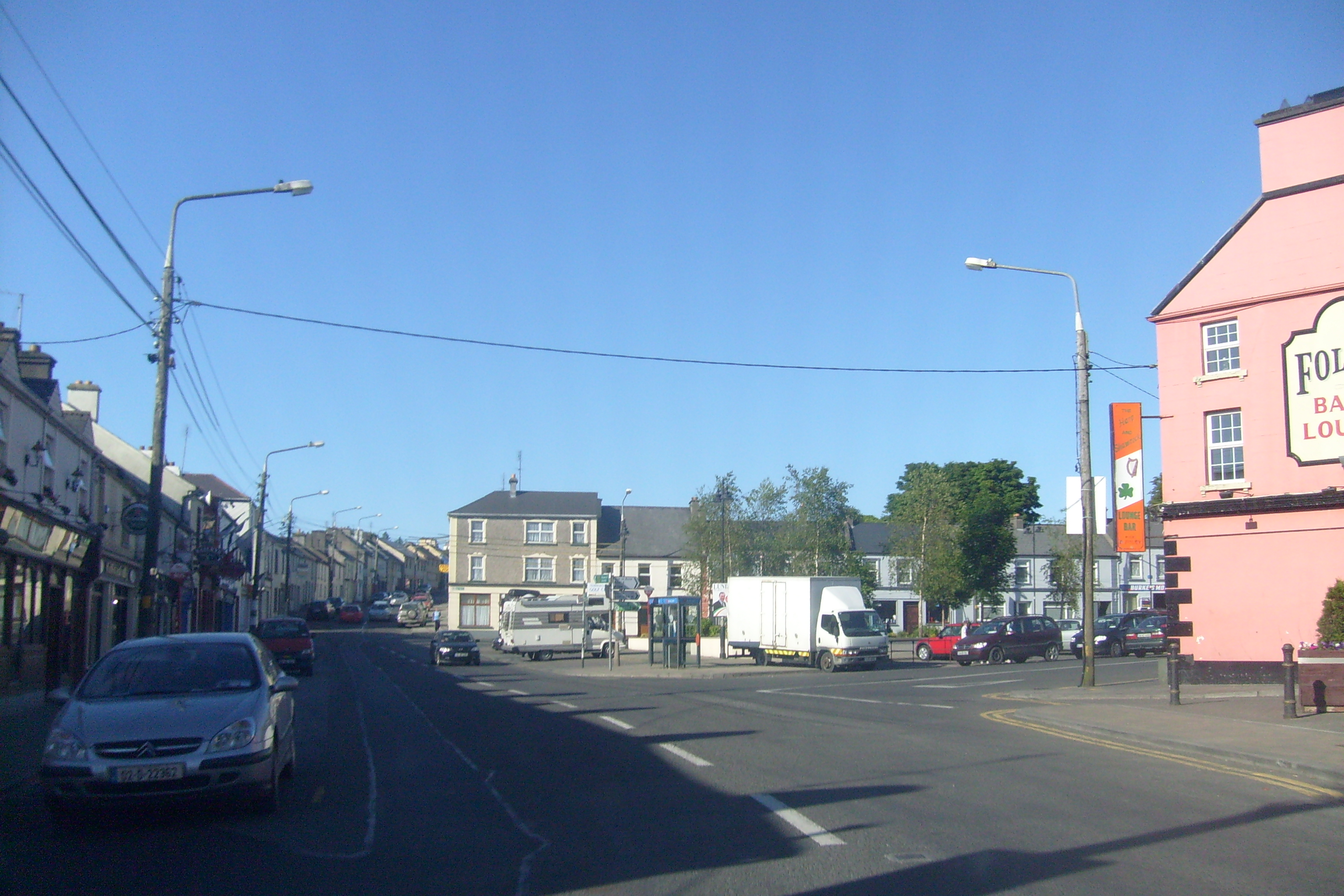
- Wolfe Tone Square

- Location in Ireland
- Coordinates: 54°03′00″N 8°44′00″W
- Country: Ireland
- Province: Connacht
- County: County Sligo
- Elevation: 92 m (302 ft)

Population (2022)
  - Total: 2,307
- Eircode routing key: F91
- Telephone area code: +353(0)71
- Irish Grid Reference: G520114

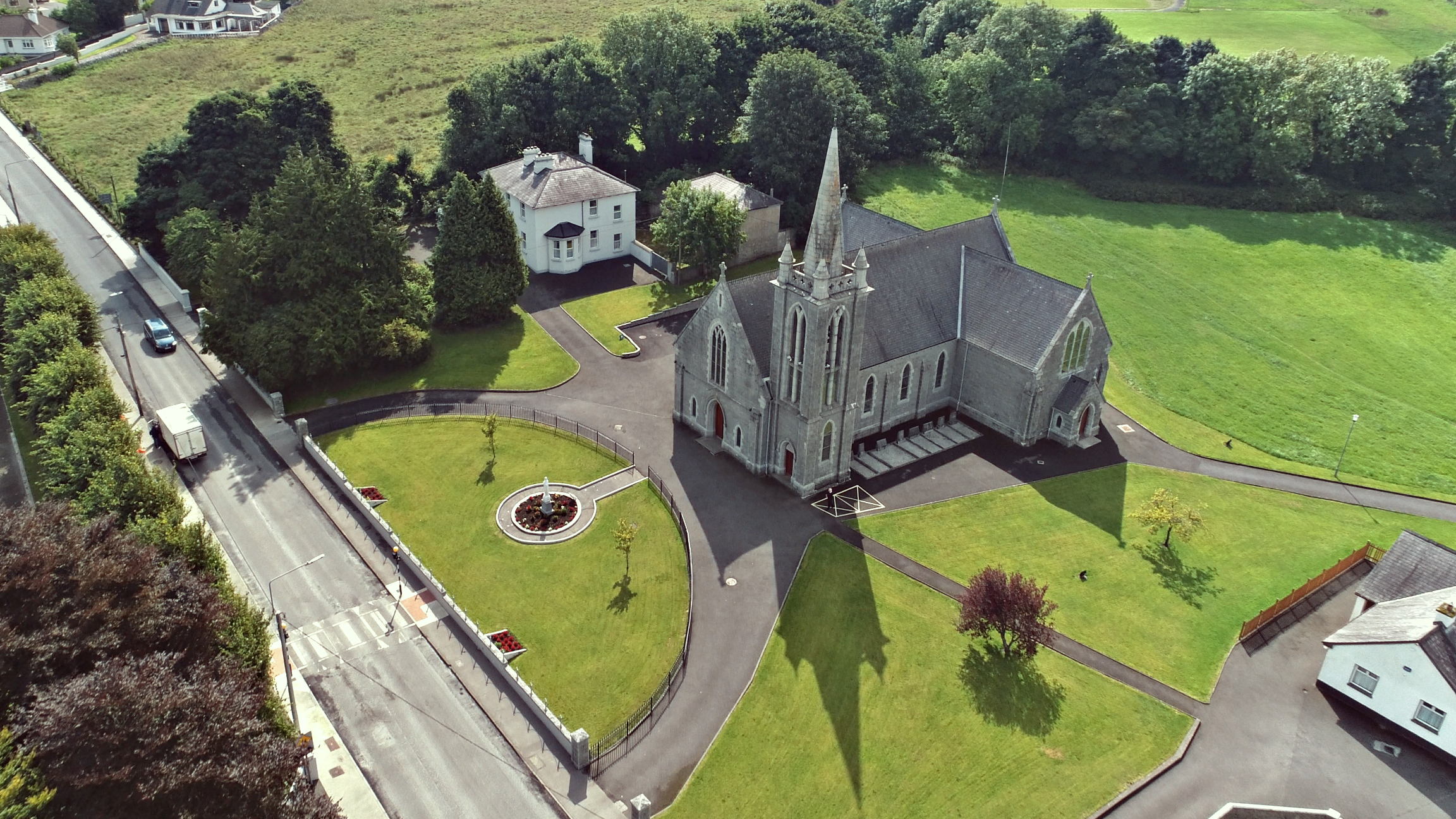
St. John the Evangelist Catholic Church

Tubbercurry or Tobercurry (Irish: Tobar an Choire, meaning 'well of the corrie') is the second-largest town in terms of both population and land area in County Sligo, Ireland. It lies at the foot of the Ox Mountains, on the N17 national primary road, and is 30 kilometres (19 mi) south-west of Sligo town. The town is twinned with Viarmes in France. Tubbercurry achieved status as a Fairtrade town in September 2008.

== History ==
The earliest mention of Tubbercurry is from 1397 when a battle took place in the town between two O’Connor families, the O'Conor Don from Roscommon and the O’Conor Sligo from Sligo town. St. Naithí and St Attracta are the patron saints of the area.

== Events ==
Tubbercurry hosts three annual festivals. These include the South Sligo Summer School of Irish traditional music, song and dance, which is held each year during the second week in July. The Old Fair Day Festival is also held annually in early August, and the Western Drama Festival is held in early March.

== Sport ==
The local Gaelic football and hurling club is Tubbercurry GAA. Real Tubber F.C. are a local association football club, and South Sligo A.C. is a local athletics club. There is a golf course on the town's edge, named Tubbercurry Golf Club. Other sports are also catered for including badminton, handball and karate.

== Education ==
Tubbercurry is home to Saint Attracta's Community School, which was opened after the merger of Banada Abbey Secondary School and the Marist Convent. St. Attracta's C.S. was opened in November 2002. The town is also home to Holy Family and Drimina National Schools.

== Economy ==
The lock manufacturing company Basta was founded in Tubbercurry in 1955.

== Transport ==
Public transport to the town is provided with a bus service which connects Tubbercurry with Galway, Sligo, Castlebar, Westport and Tuam, as well as services to nearby Ireland West Airport.

The former Tubbercurry railway station, which first opened in October 1895, was closed for passenger traffic on 17 June 1963 and closed altogether on 3 November 1975.

== Notable people ==
- Michael Fingleton, former chief executive of Irish Nationwide Building Society and key figure in the Irish financial crisis
- Tadhg Dall Ó hÚigínn, sixteenth-century bardic poet

== See also ==
- List of towns and villages in Ireland
