= R324 road (Ireland) =

Regional road in Ireland

R324 road
- Bóthar R324

Route information
- Length: 8.8 km (5.5 mi)

Location
- Country: Ireland
- Primary destinations: County Mayo; Moat, near Balla (N60); Derryvohy; Craggagh; Ballinamore; Crosses the Geestaun River; Carrowreagh near Kiltimagh (R320 road)

Highway system
- Roads in Ireland; Motorways; Primary; Secondary; Regional

The R324 road is a regional road in south central County Mayo in Ireland. It connects the N60 road near Balla to the R320 road near Kiltimagh. The road is 8.8 kilometres (5.5 mi) long (map of the road).

The government legislation that defines the R324, the Roads Act 1993 (Classification of Regional Roads) Order 2012 (Statutory Instrument 54 of 2012), provides the following official description:

R324: Balla — Kiltimagh, County Mayo

Between its junction with N60 at Moat and its junction with R320 at Derryvohy via Craggagh and Ballinamore all in the county of Mayo.

== See also ==
- List of roads of County Mayo
- National primary road
- National secondary road
- Regional road
- Roads in Ireland
