= N17 road (Ireland) =

Road between counties Galway and Sligo in Ireland

N17 road
- Bóthar N17

Route information
- Length: 122.85 km (76.34 mi)

Location
- Country: Ireland
- Primary destinations: (bypassed towns in italics): County Sligo; Leaves N4; Collooney; Ballinacarrow; Tubbercurry (R294); Curry; Bellaghy*; County Mayo; Charlestown (N5); Ireland West Airport (R376); (N83); Knock (R323); Kilkelly (R375); Claremorris (N60); Crosses the River Robe; Ballindine (R328); County Galway; Milltown; Tuam (N83, R332, M17)

Highway system
- Roads in Ireland; Motorways; Primary; Secondary; Regional

The N17 road is a national primary road in Ireland, and is part of the Atlantic Corridor route. It begins in County Galway and ends in County Sligo. On 27 September 2017 the southern Tuam–Galway section was upgraded to motorway status and designated M17.

The N17 road is featured in the song N17, released in 1991 by the Irish band The Saw Doctors.

== Route ==
The 95.05 km (59.06 mi) route commences at the Kilmore Roundabout in Tuam and ends at the Toberbride roundabout at Collooney in County Sligo. It runs through or past several major towns and places in the area including Tuam, Miltown, Ballindine, Claremorris, Knock, Kilkelly, Charlestown, Curry, Tubbercurry and Ballinacarrow. The entire route is regular highway with no sections of dual carriageway as yet. The former section of the N17 between Tuam and Galway City has been redesignated as the N83.

=== County Galway ===
The N17 begins at the Kilmore Roundabout in Tuam and bypasses the town of Tuam since 27 September 2017. After passing Tuam the route swings northwest towards Miltown, where a new realigned section of road is encountered (built late 1990s) avoiding a notorious stretch of road which saw many fatalities at one particular bend at a graveyard. This section of road was improved again in 2012, when a bad bend at Lisavalley was removed. This has left the road between Milltown and Tuam with a complete hard shoulder. The route then passes through the village of Miltown passing over the River Clare; the main street in the village is very narrow and can become congested. After leaving Miltown the route continues north towards Ballindine; this section of the N17 is of poor standard and is reduced to a narrow winding road to the County Mayo border.

=== County Mayo ===
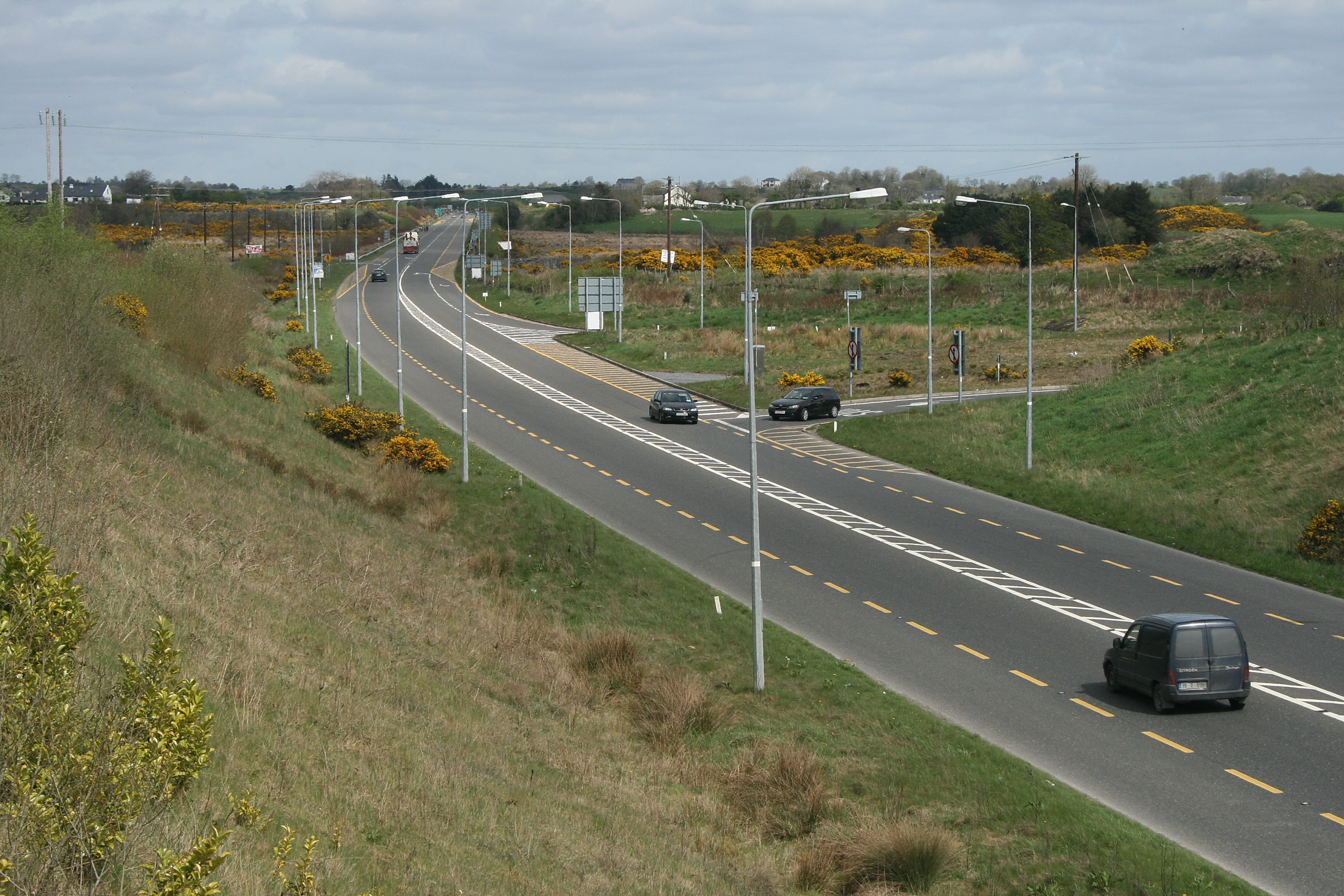
N17 Claremorris by-pass

The N17 passes through Ballindine just after it crosses the Galway/Mayo border. The main street though Ballindine is very wide reducing congestion in the village. Leaving Ballindine the route heads north towards Claremorris. This 5 km section of road was completely realigned in 1983, bypassing a dangerous stretch of road at Garryduff. This is busy section with almost 10,000 vehicles daily. At Lissduff the 16 km Claremorris/Knock bypass commences, the largest project on the N17 to date. It bypasses Claremorris to the east, greatly reducing heavy through traffic in the town. The 16 km bypass was constructed in 2 phases, the 6 km Claremorris phase (phase 1) which opened July 2001 and the 10 km Knock phase (phase 2) which opened to traffic December 2002. The Knock bypass passes the village to the west heading in a northeast direction bypassing Kilkelly (bypassed 1980s), the route continues towards Charlestown passing Ireland West Airport. This section of road is of good quality and has a hard shoulder to just south of Charlestown. The route passes over the N5 where traffic can head towards Dublin, Strokestown and Ballaghadereen or Westport, Castlebar or Ballina. The N17 proceeds through Charlestown and over the Sligo border into the village of Bellaghy.

=== County Sligo ===
After passing through Bellaghy the N17 in County Sligo heads in a northeasterly direction bypassing Curry, this 6 km section was built in 1993 and is of excellent standard. After bypassing Curry and as far as Tubbercurry the standard of the road is reduced to a very low quality winding road with a high fatality rate. The N17 passes Tubbercurry to the west in the form of a basic relief road, heavy goods vehicles use this road around the town, although many cars continue on through the town's main street as it is often faster than the relief road. The route continues in a north easterly direction towards Ballinacarrow. Two kilometres past Ballinacarrow there is a slow lane section. This 8 km section to the N4 Collooney bypass was constructed in 1993 with the bypassing of Collooney. The N17 ends where it meets the N4 Sligo-Dublin road at the Toberbride roundabout where traffic can either turn left to go to Sligo itself, Ballysadare, or the North West. Traffic can also make a right turn here to go to Dublin, Carrick-on-Shannon or Boyle.

== M17 motorway and other planned upgrades ==

A number of upgrade projects are planned for the N17, which forms part of the Atlantic Corridor, along with the N18 and N20. Prior to the 2017 upgrade, the Southern section N17 was the state's busiest single-carriageway inter-urban road with over 25,000 vehicles using the road at Claregalway daily of which over 20,000 travel on the Claregalway-Galway section south of Claregalway.

The biggest project was the upgrade of 25.5 km of this route to motorway standard, between Tuam and east of Galway. Under the Irish road numbering scheme, this section is designated as the M17 motorway (Irish: Mótarbhealach M17). It runs from a junction with the M6 motorway near Athenry, which also forms the starting point for the M18 motorway to Gort. In April 2014, this project was given the go-ahead by the Government and was completed on 27 September 2017. The existing Claregalway - Galway section was redesignated as the R381.

The motorway is not tolled.

At the northern terminus, the scheme links in with a bypass of Tuam, which provided an additional 4.2 km (2.6 mi) of dual carriageway. This is Type 2 Dual Carriageway, or "2+2 road" as it has been dubbed by the NRA. This type of scheme has some at-grade roundabout junctions and a wire barrier between the carriageways.

N17 upgrade schemes as of September 2017
Location	Type	Mainline Length (km)	Status	Notes
Galway–Tuam	Motorway	25.5	The Galway to Tuam upgrade scheme consisted of 25.5 km of motorway commencing at the interchange of the M18 and the M6 to the west of Athenry. Continuing north, the route interchanges with the N63 at Annagh Hill, then continues towards Tuam tying back in with the N17 immediately west of Tuam. It was completed on 27 September 2017.	
Tuam	Bypass	4.2	The scheme consisted of 4.2 km of 2+2 dual carriageway and 3.6 km of side roads. It provided a bypass of Tuam to the west and links into the N17 with at grade roundabouts at its northern and southern junctions. The scheme was built at the same time as the M17 Athenry-Tuam scheme. It was completed on 27 September 2017.	
Charlestown	Bypass	25.7	The scheme consists of approximately 25.7 km of 2+2 dual carriageway from the northern end of Knock Bypass to the southern end of the Tobercurry Bypass, and 15 km of single carriageway slip roads, side roads and link roads. The scheme bypasses both the towns of Kilkelly and Charlestown/ Bellahy and the village of Curry, following a route to the east of the existing N17. Mainline Length (km): 25.7	
Tobercurry	Bypass	10.2	The N17 Collooney/Charlestown Road Realignment Scheme consists of 25 km of 2+2 dual carriageway. The scheme extends from northern end of the proposed Charlestown bypass. Northwards it will bypass Curry and Tubbercurry.	
Tobercurry–Collooney	Dual carriageway	14	This scheme consists of 14 km of 2+2 dual carriageway extending from the northern end of the Tobercurry bypass to the N4/N17 roundabout at Collooney.	
Knock - Collooney	Dual Carriageway	57	This would encompass the Charlestown and Tubbercurry bypass schemes along with the bypass of the entire N17 between Knock and Collooney. It is part of the Government's Atlantic Economic Corridor as part of Project Ireland 2040. It is hoped the road is opened before 2030. It is currently at Phase 2 of the 7 phase plan set out by TII	

== See also ==
- Roads in Ireland
- Motorways in Ireland
- National secondary road
- Regional road
