= Charlestown railway station (Ireland) =

Irish disused railway station

Charlestown
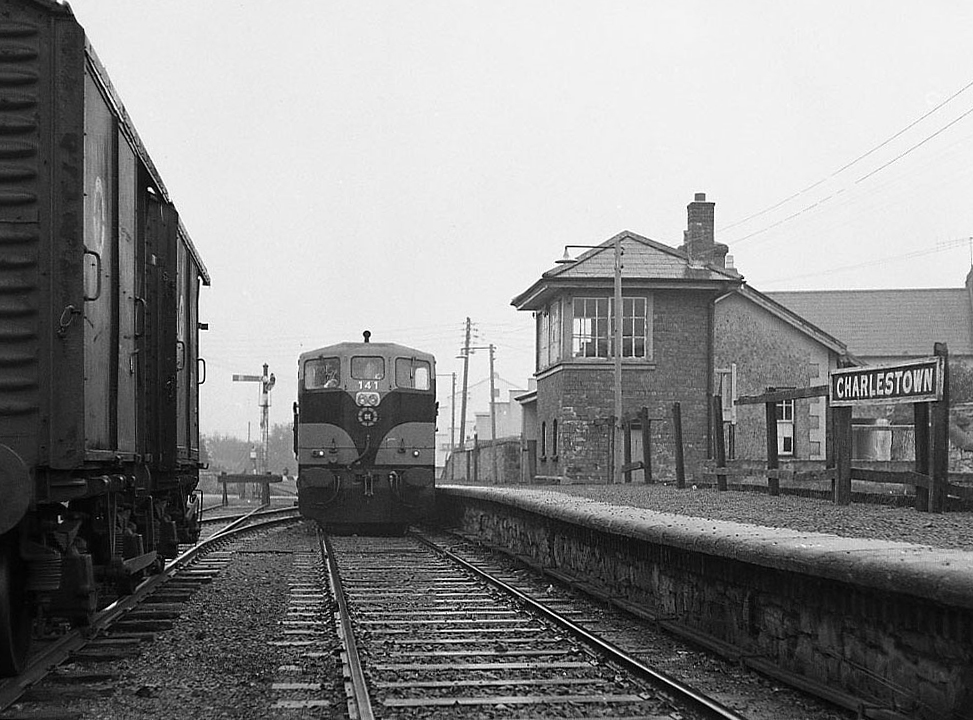
- Freight train at Charlestown in September 1975

Other services
	Proposed	
Swinford	InterCity; Limerick-Sligo	Curry

Charlestown railway station is a disused railway station in the town of Charlestown, County Mayo, Ireland. The station was originally opened in 1895, as part of the route between Claremorris and Sligo. It was closed to passenger traffic in 1963, with goods traffic ending in 1975.

As part of the Irish government's Transport 21 plan, it was proposed that the station would re-open as part of the second stage of the Western Railway Corridor project. This second stage, currently unfunded, would see the line restored between Claremorris and Sligo, with Charlestown as an intermediate stop.
