= Collooney railway station =

Railway station in County Sligo, Ireland

Collooney Cúil Mhuine
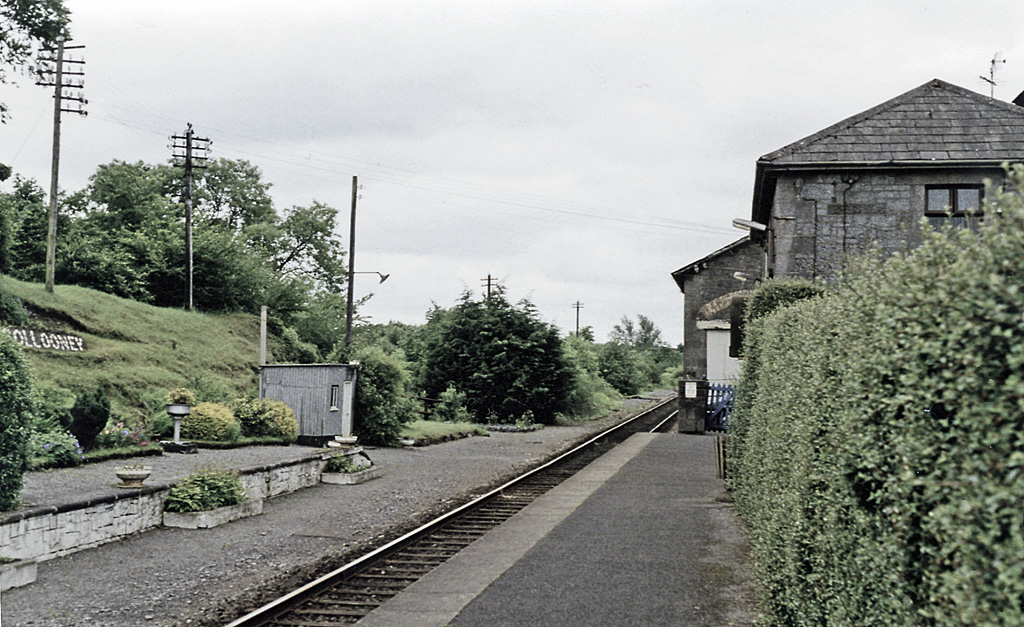
- Collooney Station in 1993

General information
- Other names: Collooney Midland; Colloney North
- Location: Collooney, County Sligo, F91 XK49; Ireland
- Coordinates: 54.186617°N 8.494781°W
- Owner: Iarnród Éireann
- Operator: Iarnród Éireann
- Platforms: 1

Construction
- Structure type: At-grade

Other information
- Station code: COLNY
- Fare zone: P

Key dates
- 1862: Station opened
Services
Preceding station	IÉ	Following station
Ballymote	InterCity; Dublin-Sligo railway line	Sligo; MacDiarmada
	Disused	
Leyny	Branch Line; Claremorris to Collooney	Terminus
Location

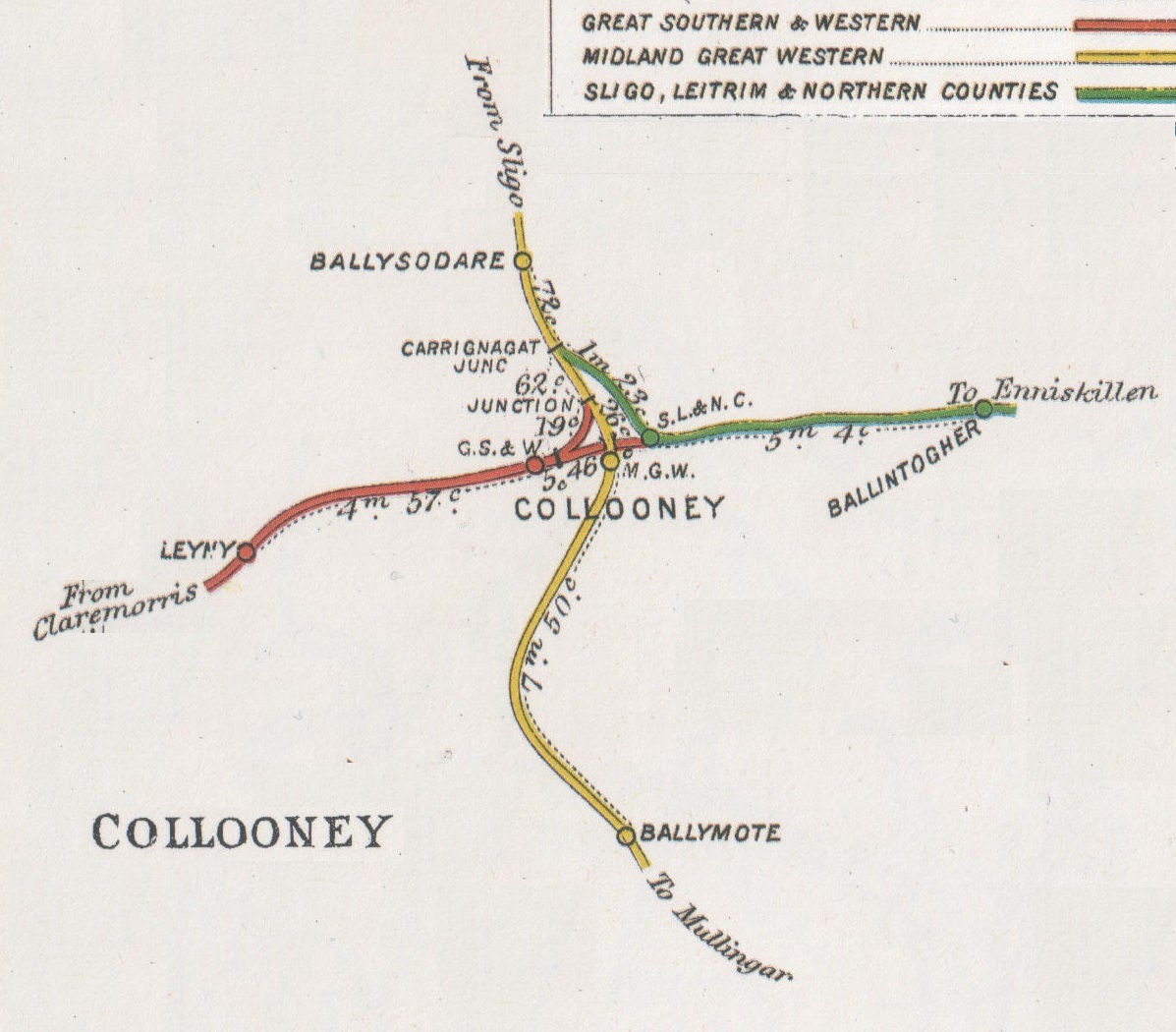
Railways stations and lines in the early 1900s

Collooney railway station serves the town of Collooney in County Sligo, Ireland and is on the Dublin-Sligo railway line. It was the first of three stations to be built in Collooney and remains the only one still in service.

== History ==
Collooney once had three railway stations. The first and sole surviving station was opened by the Midland Great Western Railway (MGWR) on 3 December 1862 as part of the extension of its line from Longford to Sligo. On 1 September 1881 the Sligo, Leitrim and Northern Counties Railway (SL&NCR) opened its station to the east, before building a connection to the MGWR at Carrignagat Junction to the north and thus completing its line from Enniskillen to Sligo. Finally, on 1 October 1895, the Waterford, Limerick and Western Railway (WL&WR) opened its station to the west, as part of the extension of its line from Claremorris to Sligo. The WL&WR was taken over by the Great Southern and Western Railway (GS&WR) in 1901.

Following the creation of the Irish Free State, the MGWR and the GS&WR became part of the Great Southern Railways (GSR) in 1925. In turn, the GSR became part of Córas Iompair Éireann (CIÉ) in 1945.

On 1 October 1957, the SL&NCR's Collooney station closed along with the company. The line to Enniskillen was lifted shortly afterward.

The GS&WR Collooney South station closed on 15 June 1963 when CIÉ withdrew passenger services between Claremorris and Sligo; this line remained open for goods traffic until 1975, after which it fell into dereliction. There is a campaign to reopen the railway between Claremorris and Collooney as part of the Western Railway Corridor, with proposals to either have the current station serve the line, or the former Collooney South station being restored to reduce journey times.

== Services ==
Today, the MGWR station is served by trains on the Dublin Connolly–Sligo InterCity service. It is unstaffed.

== See also ==
- List of railway stations in Ireland
