= Kiltimagh =

Town in County Mayo, Ireland

Kiltimagh Irish: Coillte Mach Kiltamagh
- Town
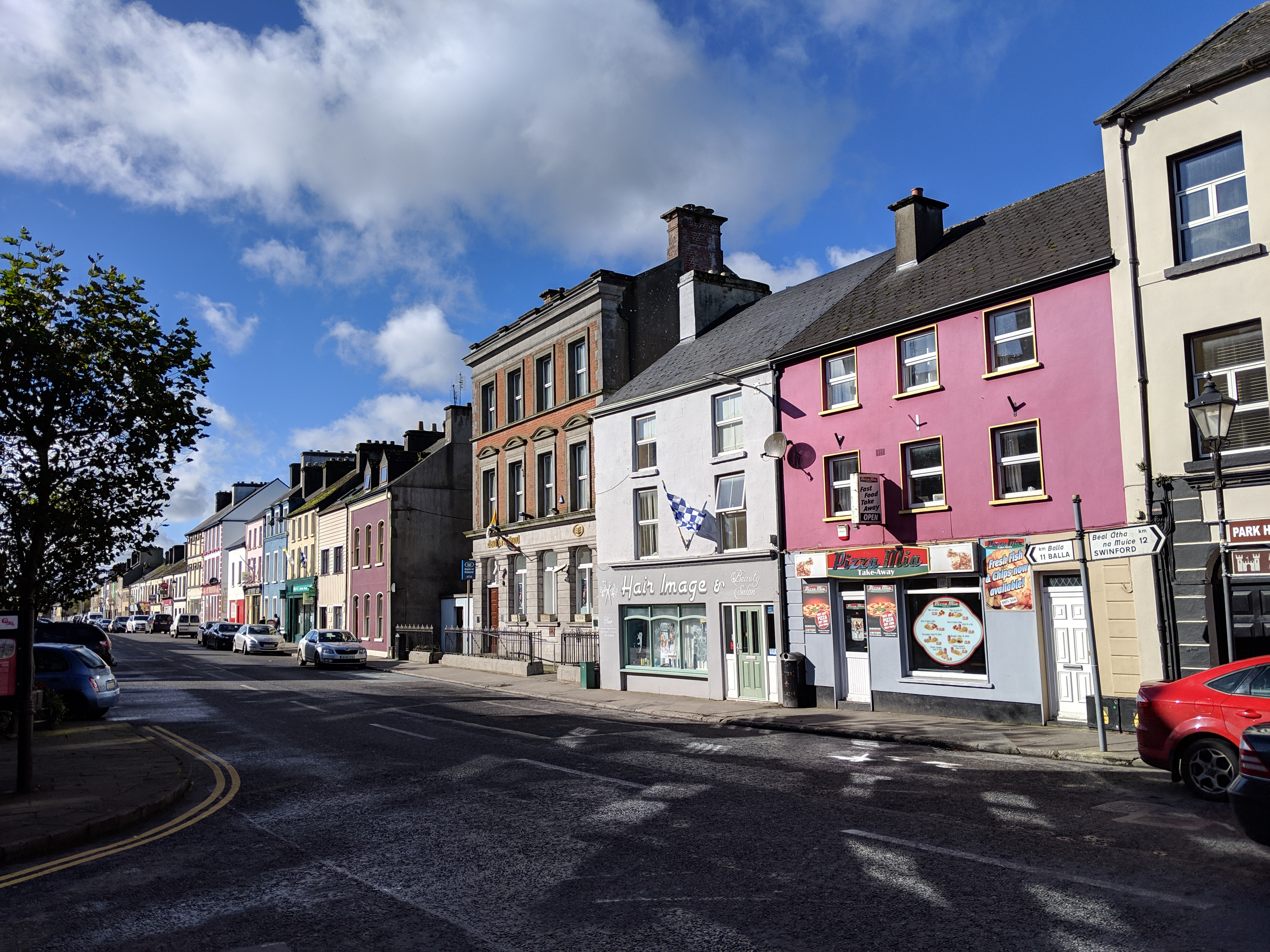
- Main street

- Location in Ireland
- Coordinates: 53°50′58″N 9°00′00″W
- Country: Ireland
- Province: Connacht
- County: County Mayo
- Elevation: 68 m (223 ft)

Population (2022)
  - Total: 1,232
- Time zone: UTC±0 (WET)
  - Summer (DST): UTC+1 (IST)
- Eircode routing key: F12
- Telephone area code: +353(0)94
- Irish Grid Reference: M342893
- Website: kiltimagh.ie

Kiltimagh (Irish: Coillte Mach) is a town in County Mayo in Ireland. As of the 2022 census, the town had a population of 1,232 people. Although there is no river going through the town, three rivers flow around the town: the Glore River, Yellow River and Pollagh River. The town centre sits at the crest of a hill surrounding The High Fort (Mooney's Fort/Lios Ard) in Fortlands and built out linearly on the main road from there.

== History ==
The town's name, in the Irish language, was originally Coillte Maghach (the woods of Maghach), based on a reputed association with a chieftain of the Fir Bolg named Maghach. Over the years this then became what it is today, Kiltimagh (Irish: Coillte Mach).

Kiltimagh is part of the barony of Gallen.

=== 17th century ===
The lands around Kiltimagh were granted to the Ormsby family by patents dated 6 April and 6 July 1677. The Ormsbys, who originally came from Louth, Lincolnshire, had resided in the area prior to 1677 and had purchased land from transplanted persons.

Prior to the arrival of the Ormsbys, the lands around Kiltimagh had been mainly owned by the Anglo-Norman Jordan (De Exeter) family. In Speed's Theatre of Great Britain and Ireland (1676), the lands of the Septs of Connaught are recorded as being confiscated including that of the territory of MacJordan near to Kiltimagh.

As late as 1876, Anthony Ormsby of Ballinamore is recorded as owning 4,492 acres (1,818 ha) in the area.

=== 18th century ===
One of the first large modern structures to be constructed in the locality was the home of Thomas Ormsby (1738-1822), Ballinamore House which was extant from around 1777. In 1836, works are recorded as being carried out at the house by Thomas Murphy for the owner Thomas Ormsby. The house was owned by members of the Ormsby family until it was sold in 1936. As of 2023, the building operates as a nursing home.

=== 19th and 20th centuries ===
From the late 19th century, Kiltimagh began to develop as more of a market town.

A number of commercial and civic buildings were constructed towards the end of the 19th and start of the 20th century including the Hibernian Bank (1904), Kiltimagh hospital (1919) and various elements of St Louis convent and chapel (1896-1915). All of these buildings were designed by William Henry Byrne and laterly with input from his son Ralph Henry Byrne.

== Geography ==
=== Slieve Carn ===
Slieve Carn (Irish: Sliabh Cairn) is a hill which stands at 262 metres (860 ft) just outside the town. The hill is mentioned in the Statistical Survey Of Mayo (1802) as having coal, and there is also evidence in places of iron deposits.

=== Bill Berry Cliff ===
A cliff that runs through the hill that has been measured to be 100 metres (330 ft) deep by local farmers. A tributary of the Pollagh River starts at the top of the hill as drainage from the bog and runs through the cliff, leaving three waterfalls.

== Transport ==
=== Rail ===
Kiltimagh railway station opened on 1 October 1895, and finally closed on 17 June 1963. While it has been proposed to reopen the station as part of the Western Railway Corridor, the station is now home to the Kiltimagh Museum and sculpture park, with displays of local history and culture.

In June 2023, the recreational "Velorail" service was opened at the station. In this tourist attraction, carts are pedalled by visitors along 7 km (4.3 mi) of track by the station.

=== Bus ===
As at 2023, Bus Éireann route 421, with buses to/from Claremorris, runs several times a day, Monday to Friday. Also, Local Link route 795 to and from Ballyhaunis runs on Thursdays.

== Sport ==
Among the sporting teams based in Kiltimagh, Kiltimagh GAA (in Irish CLG Coillte Mach) is a Gaelic football club located in Kiltimagh who play at Gilmartin Park.

Kiltimagh Knock United FC play in the Mayo Super League and have their home ground is CMS Park in Cloonlee.

Mayo Volleyball Club were Volleyball Ireland's Division Two champions in 2017, and play their home games at Saint Louis Community School.

Kiltimagh Handball Club is a handball club in the town. Kiltimagh Giants Basketball Club is a local basketball club which was established in 2002.

== Festivals ==
Local festivals include the annual Kiltimagh Choral Festival (held in February), the week-long Saint Patrick's Festival and parade (held in March), and Féile Oíche Shamhna Coillte Mach (a Halloween festival which includes a 'spooky walk' at the sculpture park in Kiltimagh).

Other events include the Coillte Home Come Festival, which was restarted in 2016, and is based on an earlier 1960s festival. Its aim is to bring back Kiltimagh's diaspora on an annual basis and includes a fair at the festival field and other activities. The Kiltimagh Drama One Act Festival is also an annual event, held over three nights in November.

== Education ==
There are two local Catholic primary schools, Saint Aidan's National School in Thomas Street and Craggagh National School is 48 km (30 mi) outside the town on the R324 road. The local secondary school is Saint Louis Community School, formerly a Catholic convent school and secondary school.

== "Culchie" ==
The Oxford English Dictionary suggests that the word "culchie", a mildly derogatory term for a country person or one not from Dublin city, may be an "alteration of Kiltimagh, Irish Coillte Mach (older Mághach), the name of a country town in Co. Mayo". Other sources suggest that "culchie" is derived from the Irish word coillte, the Irish word for "woods" or "forests".

== Notable people ==
- Thomas Flatley, real estate developer and philanthropist
- Vinnie Kilduff, multi-instrumental traditional musician, composer and producer
- Sean Lavan, Irish sprinter. He competed in the 200m at the 1924 Summer Olympics and the 1928 Summer Olympics.
- William Philbin, Roman Catholic bishop of Clonfert (1953–1962) and Down and Connor (1962–1982).
- Antoine Ó Raifteirí (Anthony Raftery), blind Irish-language poet.
- Micheál Schlingermann, former Sligo Rovers goalkeeper, was raised in the town and also kept goal for the local GAA team at one point.
- Gene Tunney champion Irish-American boxer, his parents John and Mary Lydon Tunney were from the town.
- Louis Walsh, pop music manager and judge on The X Factor.
