= Claremorris railway station =

Railway station in County Mayo, Ireland

Claremorris Clár Chlainne Mhuiris
- The station platforms in 2019

General information
- Location: Claremorris; County Mayo, F12 D892; Ireland
- Coordinates: 53°43′15″N 9°00′08″W
- Operator: Iarnród Éireann
- Platforms: 3
- Bus operators: TFI Local Link
- Connections: 431

Other information
- Station code: CLMRS

History
- Opened: 19 May 1862
Location

Claremorris railway station serves the town of Claremorris in County Mayo, Ireland, as well as being a railway junction for the surrounding region. It opened on 19 May 1862.

The station is on the Dublin to Westport Line. Passengers to or from Galway will need to travel to Athlone and change trains. Passengers to or from Ballina and Foxford will need travel to Manulla Junction and change trains.

== Proposals ==
The station has been proposed as a junction on the Western Rail Corridor, in the event that Phase Two (Athenry to Tuam) and Phase Three (Tuam to Claremorris) are completed as planned.

== Services ==
The summary of weekday services calling at this station are:

- 6 trains per day to Dublin Heuston
- 7 trains per day to Westport

Preceding station	Iarnród Éireann	Following station
Ballyhaunis	Intercity; Dublin–Westport/Galway railway line	Manulla Junction
	Disused railways	
Terminus	Ballinrobe to Claremorris	Hollymount
Ballindine	Western Railway Corridor	Kiltimagh
