= William Wilde (disambiguation) =

William Wilde (1815–1876) was an Irish surgeon and writer.

William Wilde may also refer to:

- Sir William Wilde, 1st Baronet (c. 1611–1679), English judge and politician
- William Allan Wilde (1827–1902), American publisher and politician
- Willie Wilde (1852–1899), Irish journalist and poet
- Jimmy Wilde (William Wilde, 1892–1969), Welsh boxer

== See also ==
- William Wild (disambiguation)
