= IRA Memorial =

IRA Memorial may refer to a number of memorials associated with organisations known as the Irish Republican Army, including:

- IRA Memorial, Athlone, on Custume Place in County Westmeath, Ireland
- IRA Memorial, Cork, at University College Cork in Cork city, Ireland
- Republican Memorial, Crossmaglen, in County Armagh, Northern Ireland
- War of Independence Commemorative Military Memorial, also known as the "Old IRA Memorial", in County Roscommon, Ireland

== See also ==
- Independence Monument
- War Memorial (disambiguation)
