= R369 road =

R369 road may refer to:

- R369 road (Ireland)
- R369 road (South Africa)
