= R370 road =

R370 road may refer to:

- R370 road (Ireland)
- R370 road (South Africa)
