= Smith Hill =

Smith Hill is the name of many places, among them:

- Smith Hill (house), a notable house in Elphin, Ireland
- Smith Hill, Providence, Rhode Island, a neighborhood
- Smith Hill (Oneida County, New York), an elevation in New York
- The site of a particularly long-range broadcast tower in Herkimer County, New York
- Smith's Hill High School is often referred to as "Smith Hill" among Edmund Rice College students
- Smith Hill, a summit on the White Rock (Taconic Mountains) ridgeline of the northeast United States
