= Charles D. Read =

New Zealand-British gynaecologist (1902–1957)

Sir Charles David Read FRCS FRCSE FRACS (22 December 1902 – 21 August 1957) was a New Zealand surgeon who specialised in obstetrics, gynaecology and pathology after moving to the United Kingdom.

== Early life and education ==
Read was born in Woodlands, in the province of Southland, New Zealand, to businessman Joseph James and Elizabeth Brown Read. Read attended Southland Boys' High School and Otago Boys' High School. In 1920 he entered Otago Medical School in Dunedin and graduated four years later.

== Career ==
In 1926, after completing a residency at Dunedin Hospital, Read went to London. He served as secretary and vice-president of the obstetrical division of the Royal Society of Medicine, and became President of the Royal College of Obstetricians and Gynaecologists in 1955. He was an honorary member of the American Association of Obstetricians, Gynaecologists and Abdominal Surgeons, the American Gynaecological Society, the South African Association of Obstetricians and Gynaecologists, and the Athens Obstetrical and Gynaecological Society.

He edited the 5th edition of Edward Lockyer's Gynaecology with Douglas MacLeod, and he was engaged with MacLeod on a revision of Bonney's Textbook of Gynaecological Surgery.

He married twice, having two sons by each marriage. His first wife was Mabyn Gill, and his second wife was Dr F Edna Wilson, sister of the eminent Anglo-Irish surgeon T.G. Wilson.

Read died suddenly, aged 54, aboard his yacht on 21 August 1957. Lady Read died in 2003.
