= An Tóstal =

An Tóstal (Irish pronunciation: [ənˠ ˈt̪ˠoːst̪ˠəl̪ˠ], meaning "The Gathering") was the name for a series of festivals held in Ireland in the 20th century. Inaugurated in 1953 as a celebration of Irish life, it continued on until 1958 when it died out in most centres except Drumshanbo, County Leitrim.

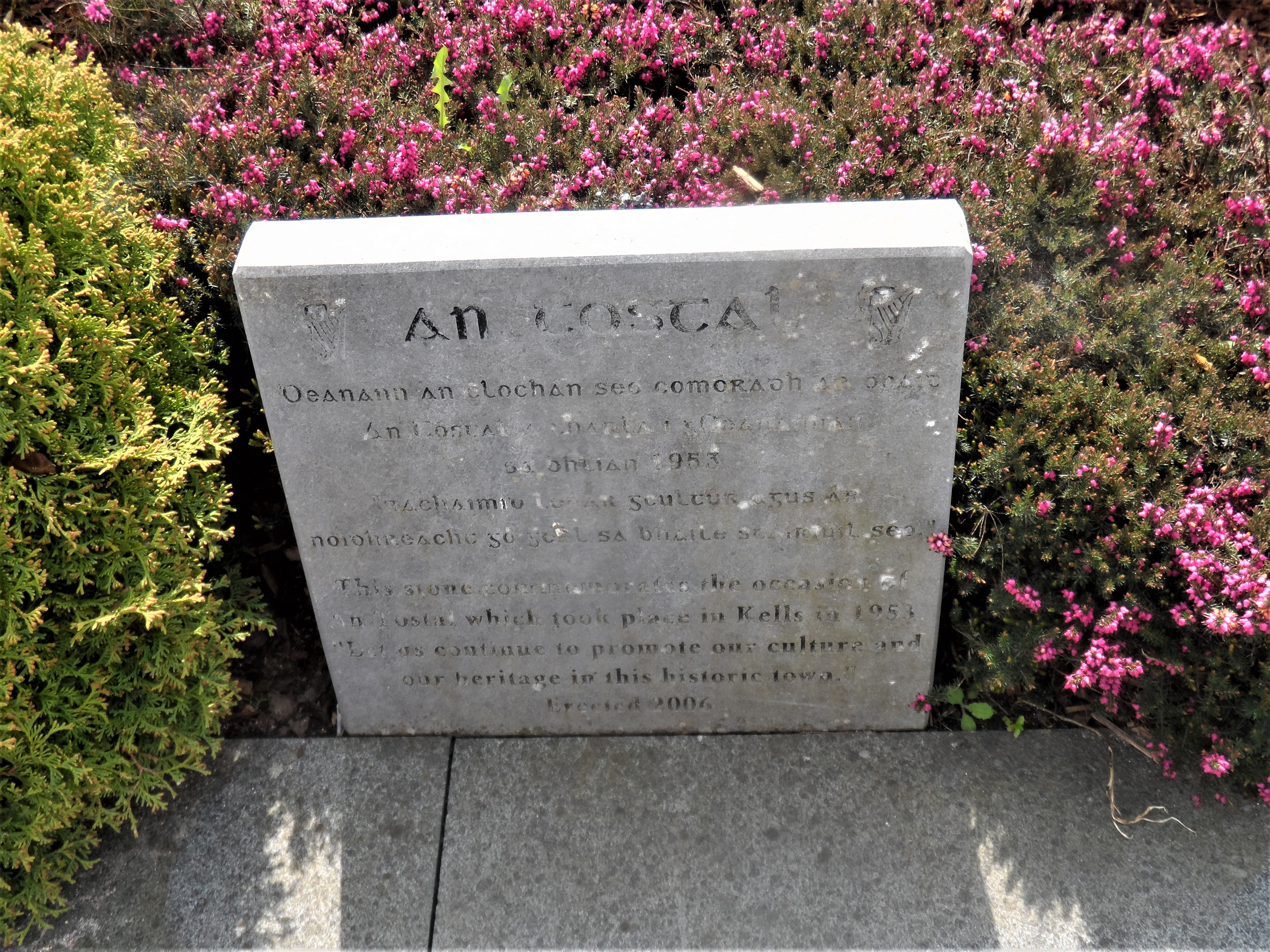
An Tóstal commemorative stone, Kells, County Meath

== Establishment ==
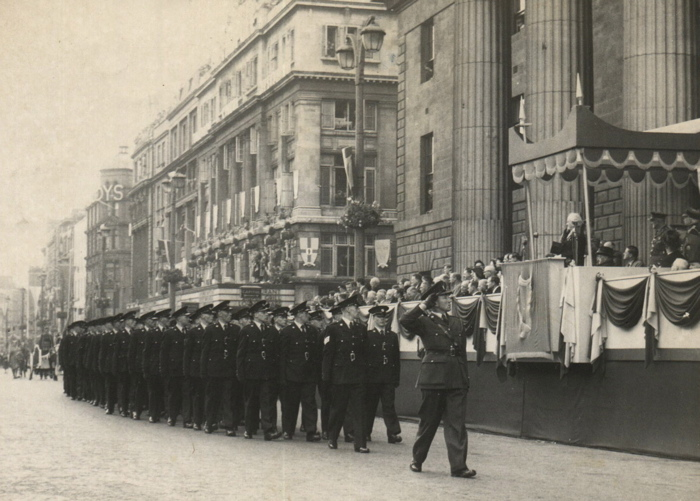
New Garda recruits march past the GPO, during the Tóstal celebrations of 1954. On the daïs is President Seán T. O'Kelly

After seeing the 1951 Festival of Britain, the President of Pan Am Airlines thought of the idea of an Irish version. The original purpose of the festival was a celebration of Irish culture, with an emphasis upon drawing tourists into the country during the Easter off-season. It was marked by a series of regional parades, arts and sporting events. Many towns began a clean-up plan, thus starting off the National Tidy Town Awards, which is running still in Ireland. In 1953, a set of commemorative stamps designed by Limerick artist Fergus O'Ryan, were issued by the Irish Post Office.

== Competitions ==
=== Chess ===
Chess competitions were held as part of An Tóstal by the Irish Chess Union from 1953 to 1957, from 1954, 1955 and 1956 it included International Chess masters, the 1957 competitions included a FIDE Zonal tournament. The competition in 1953 was won by T. Kelly after a playoff, the 1954, 1955 and 1956 masters competitions were won by Belgian Grandmaster Albéric O'Kelly de Galway, and the 1957 competition was won by Czech Grandmaster Luděk Pachman.

=== Rugby ===
In rugby, the winners of the Munster schools cup hosted their Leinster counterparts at Thomond Park. Blackrock were beaten by Rockwell.

=== Hockey ===
The Irish Hockey Union held an exhibition match between Connaught Selectd XI and the Schools of Ireland XI on 9 April 1953, at the Mental Hospital grounds Carlow which the School of Ireland won by 4 to 3. The Irish Times report by A. Goodridge on the following day stated that this was the "first ever appearance" of an Irish Schools Hockey team.

== Incidents ==
The 1953 "Bowl of Light" vandalism incident was linked to the An Tóstal. The Bowl of Light, erected in the centre of the O'Connell Bridge, was an artwork that was part of the An Tóstal movement in 1953. Anthony Babington Wilson was fined £48 in 1953 for throwing the Bowl of Light into the River Liffey. The politician Colm Gallagher remarked, on the Bowl of Light, in 1953 that, "O'Connell Bridge has been spoiled by the 'slab of concrete' and it was a disgrace to the city to see workmen using shovels during recent weeks to remove the water from the various openings".

== An Tóstal - Drumshanbo ==
Drumshanbo in County Leitrim has the distinction of being the only place that An Tóstal has continued to run every year since 1953. Recent years has seen events have been held over a week, with events such as the "Stylish Silage" in the village. Other events include music performances, fishing and art workshops, poetry readings, motorbike stunts, a table quiz and water sports activities.

== Legacy ==
The All-Ireland Drama Festival began as part of An Tóstal. The cleaning up of towns inspired the creation of the National Tidy Towns Competition. The Festival of Kerry and The Rose of Tralee in 1959 grew out of An Tóstal as well, as did the Cork International Choral Festival and the Cork International Film Festival. The 2013 tourism initiative The Gathering was a similar initiative to An Tóstal. Film archives from the festival from 1953 to 1957 are held in the Irish Film Institute. In 2011, Salthill in Galway staged a festival called An Tóstal, which included currach races; The winning currach team from the 1955 festival opened the festival.

== In literature ==
One of the last plays of Sean O'Casey, The Drums of Father Ned (1957), is set during the preparations for a Tostal in the fictional town of Doonavale. It was intended to be presented in the Dublin Tostal of 1958 but due to the objections of the Archbishop of Dublin was withdrawn along with a theatrical adaptation of James Joyce's Ulysses. O'Casey thereafter banned professional productions of his plays in Ireland.

== Stamps ==
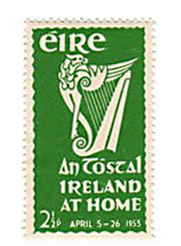
Tóstal commemorative 2 1/2d stamp from 1953

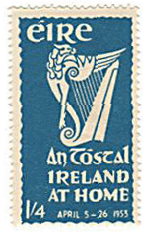
Tóstal commemorative 1/4 stamp from 1953
