= William Wild =

William Wild may refer to:

- William Wild (cricketer) (1846–1891), English cricketer
- William Wild (politician) (1834–1861), Australian politician

== See also ==
- William Wilde (disambiguation)
