= Elphin Windmill =

Windmill in Elphin, Ireland

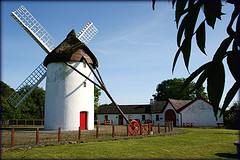
- Interactive map of Elphin Windmill

Origin
- Mill name: Elphin Windmill
- Coordinates: 53°51′07″N 8°12′19″W
- Year built: c.1730

Information
- Purpose: Corn and flax milling
- Type: Tower mill
- Storeys: Three storey tower
- No. of sails: Four sails
- Type of sails: Common sails
- Winding: Tailpole

Elphin Windmill is a fully restored 18th-century tower mill in Elphin, County Roscommon, viewed as a rare piece of Irish industrial architectural heritage, and possibly the oldest operational windmill in Ireland.

== History ==
Elphin windmill is a circular, three-stage windmill, dating from around 1730. It was built by Edward Synge, a local landowner and Bishop of Elphin. The mill provided corn meal for the local people, as well as milling flax.

The windmill has four timber sails, and unusually, the rotating roof is thatched, originally in rye. The timber tail pole is connected from the roof to a cart wheel on the ground guided by a groove, which was used to change the direction of the sails.

According to the National Inventory of Architectural Heritage, "after the Napoleonic Wars ended in 1815, cereal-milling became less profitable, and many windmills fell into disuse thereafter...[the] Elphin [windmill] was already in ruins by the 1830s".

This is corroborated by a second-hand account (reaching back to at least 1843) by the "School's Collection" from the National Folklore Collection, a national survey of local folklore conducted by the schoolchildren of Ireland (including Elphin's), dating from the 1930s. One entry from May 1938 states "There is a windmill about a quarter of a mile on the north-side of the town. It is in the village of Chanterland and it is on the left-hand side of the road as a person goes from Elphin to Boyle. It is a circular structure and it was well built because although it is very old it is as good as when it was built. There are two doors on it one facing the other but one is filled with stones. There is a stream going by the mill and where the Boyle road crosses it is called The Mill Dam. The stream rises in the Deanery and it flows in an eastern direction. There are none of the mill stones to be seen around the Mill. A man named Culligan who died fifteen years ago said that the Windmill was not worked for eighty years before that".

== Current use ==
The windmill had fallen into ruins by 1830. It was extensively renovated over the course of three years, ending in 1996, by a FÁS scheme and Elphin Area Community Enterprise Ltd. The interior was reconstructed using wood. The windmill is now fully functional, and was officially opened to the public on 22 June 1996 by actor Gabriel Byrne.

There is a modern addition to a small building, known as Windmill Cottage, that houses a visitor's centre.
