= Patrick Roddy =

Irish recipient of the Victoria Cross

- Born: 17 March 1827; Elphin, County Roscommon
- Died: 21 November 1895 (aged 68); Jersey, Channel Islands
- Military career
- Allegiance: United Kingdom
- Branch: Bengal Army; British Indian Army
- Rank: Colonel
- Conflicts: Second Anglo-Sikh War; Indian Mutiny; Abyssinian War
- Awards: Victoria Cross

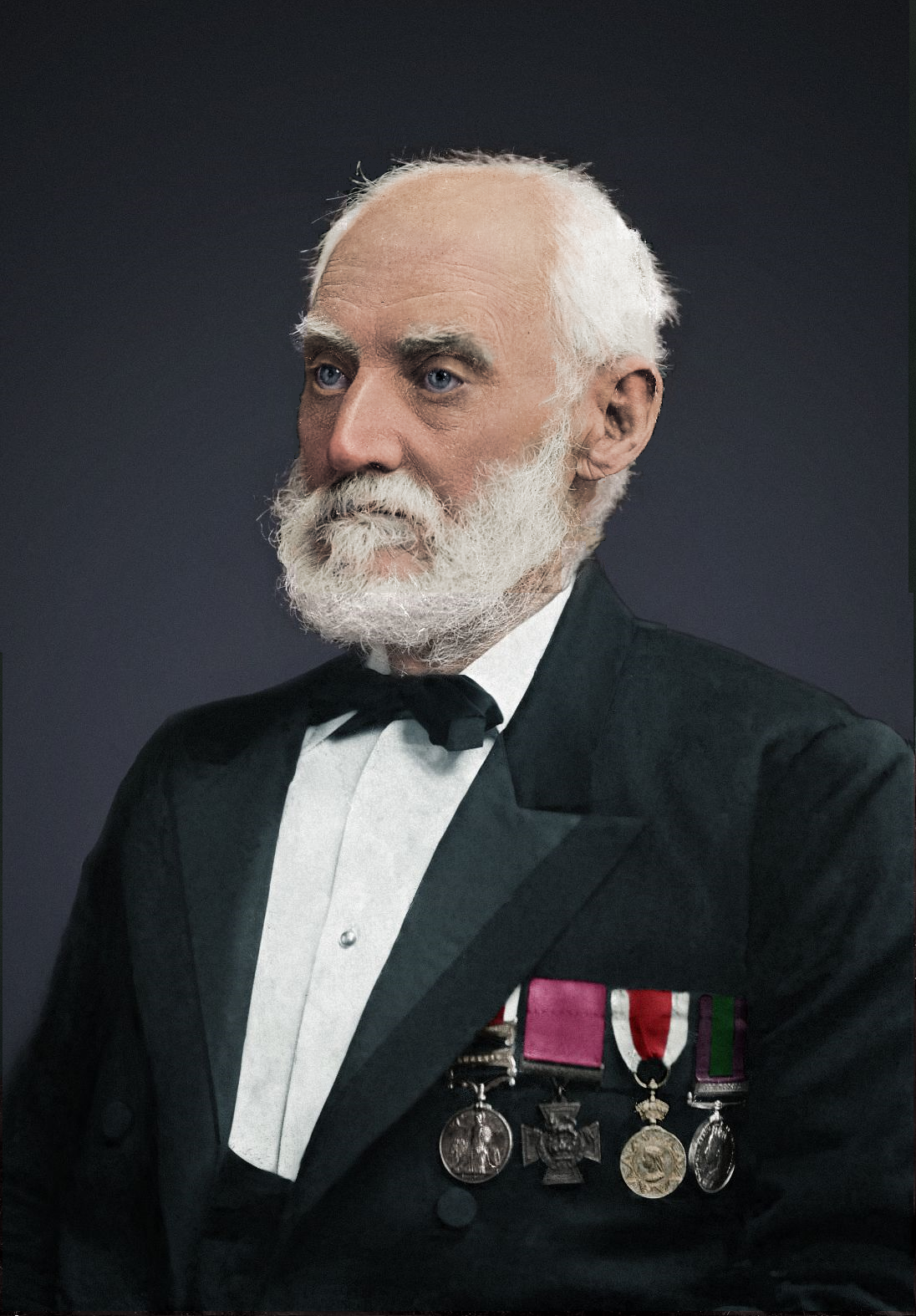
Patrick Roddy V.C. - A colourised restoration of a photograph taken circa 1890

Colonel Patrick Roddy VC (17 March 1827 – 21 November 1895) was an Irish recipient of the Victoria Cross, the highest and most prestigious award for gallantry in the face of the enemy that can be awarded to British and Commonwealth forces.

== Details ==
He was 31 years old, and an ensign in the Bengal Army during the Indian Mutiny when the following deed took place for which he was awarded the VC.

Ensign (now Lieutenant) Patrick Roddy

Date of Act of Bravery, 27th September, 1858

Major-General Sir James Hope Grant, K.C.B., Commanding Oudh Force, bears testimony to the gallant conduct of Lieutenant Roddy, on several occasions. One instance is particularly mentioned.

On the return from Kuthirga of the Kuppurthulla Contingent, on the 27th of September, 1858, this officer, when engaged with the enemy, charged a Rebel (armed with a percussion musket), whom the Cavalry were afraid to approach, as each time they attempted to do so, the Rebel knelt and covered his assailant; this, however, did not deter Lieutenant Roddy, who went boldly in, and when within six yards, the Rebel fired, killing Lieutenant Roddy's horse, and before he could get disengaged from the horse, the Rebel attempted to cut him down. Lieutenant Roddy seized the Rebel until he could get at his sword, when he ran the man through the body. The Rebel turned out to be a subadar of the late 8th Native Infantry,—a powerful man, and a most determined character.

== Further information ==
He served in the Abyssinian War and the Second Anglo-Afghan War. He later achieved the rank of colonel. He died at Jersey, Channel Islands on 21 November 1895.
