= Henry Louis Stephens =

American cartoonist

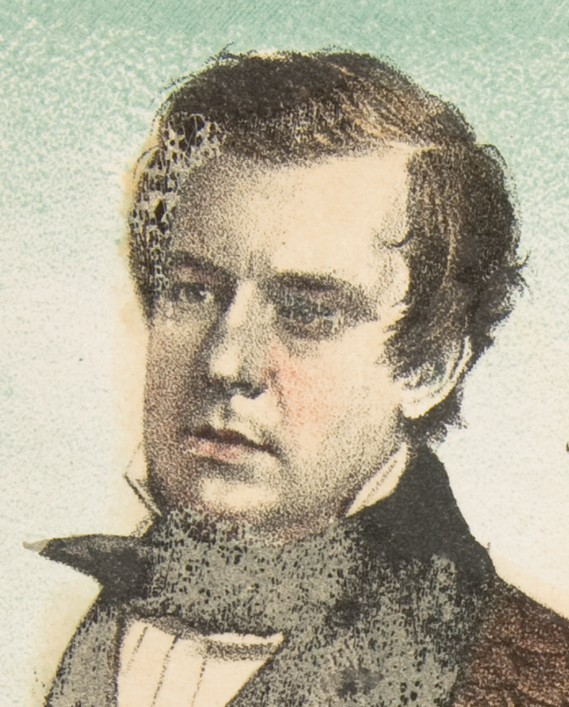
Self-portrait caricature from The Comic Natural History of the Human Race

Henry Louis Stephens (February 11, 1824 – December 13, 1882) was an American illustrator and editorial cartoonist.

== Art career ==
Henry Louis Stephens was born in Philadelphia in 1824. Around 1859, he went to New York under an engagement with Frank Leslie. After a year, he transferred his services to Harper & Brothers. Stephens was a prolific artist and accomplished a great amount of work for book and magazine illustration.

=== Publications ===
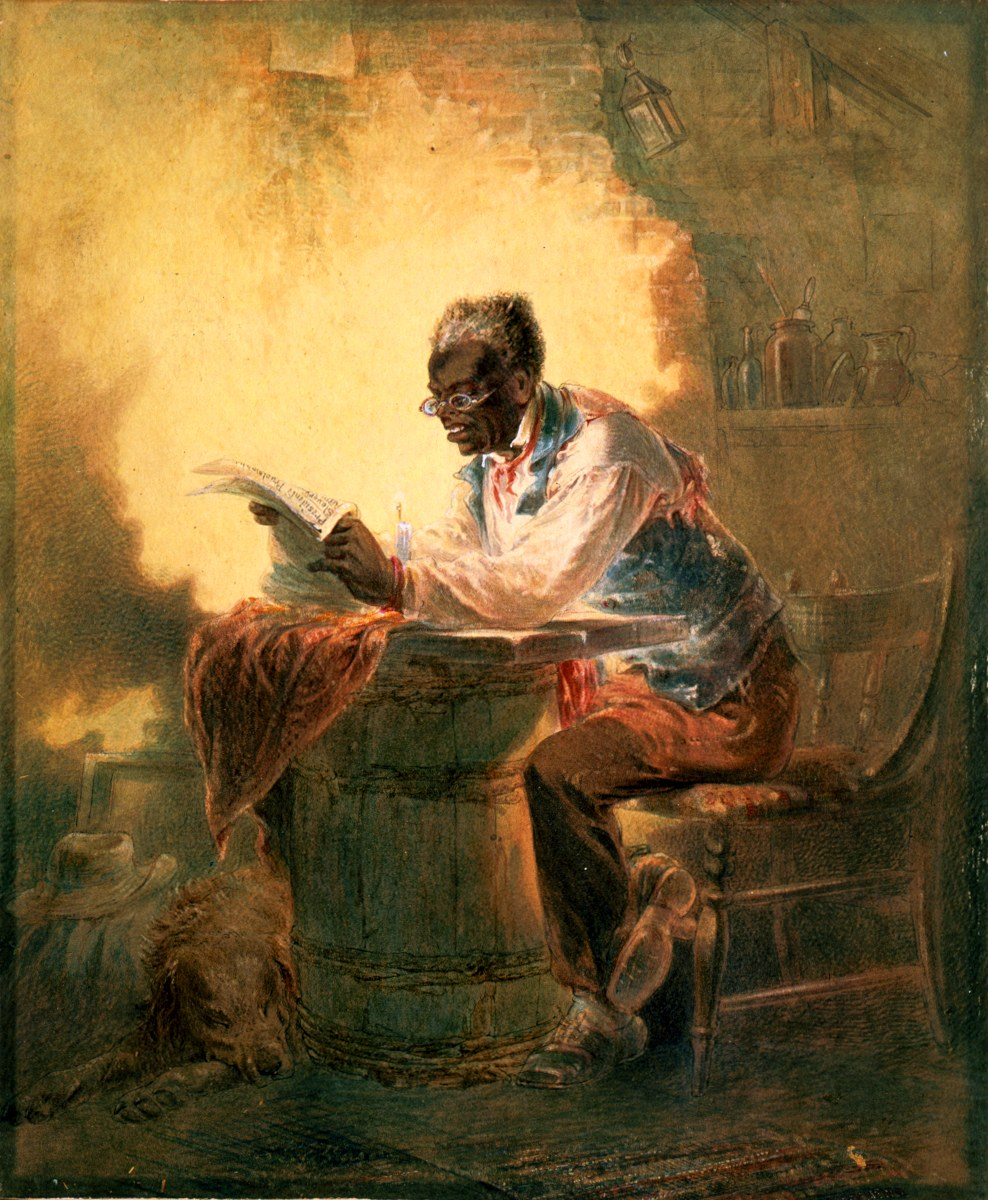
Henry Louis Stephens, untitled watercolor of a black man reading a newspaper by candlelight, c. 1863. The paper's headline reports the Emancipation Proclamation.

Stephens was well known as a caricaturist, excelling especially in the humorous delineation of animals, and drew cartoons and sketches for The Cyclopedia of Wit and Humor (1858), a book edited by William Evans Burton, Vanity Fair (1859–63), Mrs. Grundy (1869), Punchline (1870), and other periodicals. He contributed artwork to Mark Twain's comic memoir, Roughing It and the novel The Gilded Age: A Tale of Today by Mark Twain and Charles Dudley Warner. He illustrated some children's books, including Aesop's Fables, Death of Cock Robin, and The House that Jack Built; he wrote and illustrated The Goblin Snob (c. 1855), a satirical poem, as well as The Comic Natural History of the Human Race (1851). He painted in watercolors, but rarely exhibited his works.

Stephens died in Bayonne, New Jersey.
