= R368 road (Ireland) =

Road in Ireland

Coordinates: 53.727889°N 8.165616°W

R368 road
- Bóthar R368
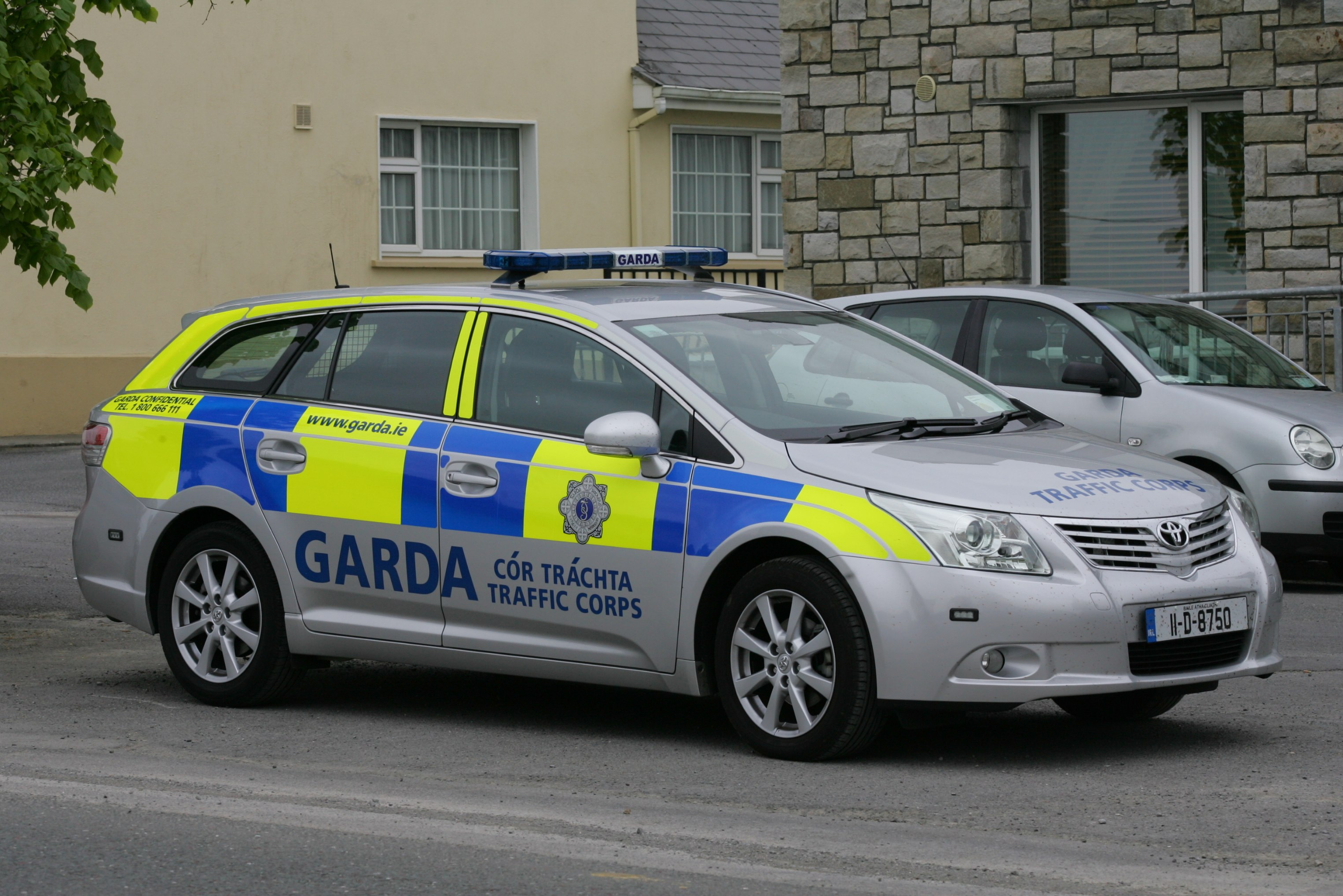
- Garda car on the R368

Route information
- Length: 34.6 km (21.5 mi)

Major junctions
- From: N4 Carrick-on-Shannon
- R370 Cortober; Crosses Killukin River; R369 Elphin; Crosses Owneur River; N5 Strokestown
- To: N61 Four Mile House

Location
- Country: Ireland

Highway system
- Roads in Ireland; Motorways; Primary; Secondary; Regional

The R368 road is a regional road in Ireland, located in County Roscommon.
