= Anthony Babington Wilson =

Anthony Charles Babington Wilson (born 2 May 1931) is a former business executive, artist and author. His artwork was prominent in Dublin and Parisien society within the late 50s.

He is the son of T.G. Wilson, an eminent Anglo-Irish surgeon and social figure, and his wife Mary Babington, the daughter of Sir Anthony Babington. He was educated at Eton College and Trinity College, Dublin.

Wilson was the Financial Controller (a senior accounting position) of British Oxygen Company until his retirement on 2 May 1987. His articles on corporate planning, drawn from an unpublished book, often featured in business journals such as Management Decision and Accountancy Age. He has also delivered various lectures on corporate planning.

As an artist, Wilson's first exhibitions were held in Grafton Street during the 50s. These exhibitions were opened by Sir Alexander Clutterbuck and Sir Ian Maclennan, both British Ambassadors to Ireland, respectively. Later exhibitions took place in Paris.

One of his most famous incidents was the vandalism of the 'Bowl of Light' on 19 April 1953. The Bowl of Light, erected in the centre of the O'Connell Bridge, was artwork that was part of the An Tóstal movement in 1953. Wilson's vandalism of the Bowl of Light made national headlines, and his preferential treatment as a gentleman of the Anglo-Irish class was questioned by some. He was fined £48 (£1,208.88 in 2015) in 1953. However, many agreed with Wilson's vandalism (he had claimed that the artwork was aesthetically offensive). The politician Colm Gallagher remarked, on the Bowl of Light, in 1953 that, 'O’Connell Bridge has been spoiled by the ‘slab of concrete’ and it was a disgrace to the city to see workmen using shovels during recent weeks to remove the water from the various openings.'. Sheila Pim's 1957 novel Other People's Business is dedicated to Anthony in honour of the An Tóstal affair.

Under the name Tony Wilson, he authored the Universe on a Bicycle in 2007, an account of human behaviour in relation to dual nature theory and Darwinism. His ideas on sociology have also been delivered in lectures on Nietzsche and animal behaviour.
