= Magazines named Vanity Fair =

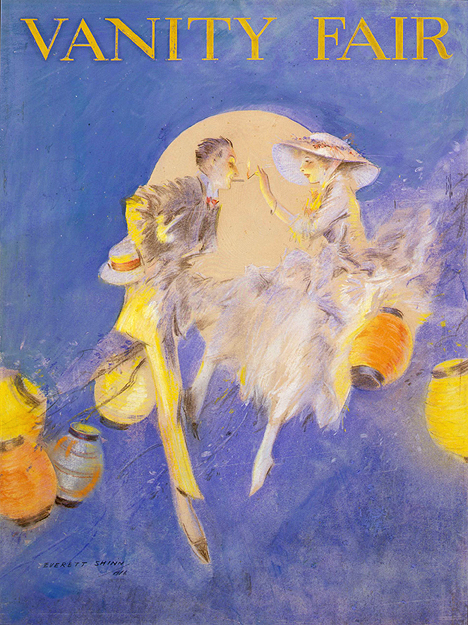
Cover of the June 1916 Vanity Fair, edited by Condé Nast

The name Vanity Fair has been the title of at least five magazines from the 19th century to the present day, where, since 1983, it has been used by the American popular culture magazine published by Condé Nast.

The first Vanity Fair was an American publication that ran from 1859 to 1863; after which a second, unrelated British publication was in print from 1868 to 1914; a third short-lived American magazine of the name was printed in New York between 1902 and 1904; and the fourth was an American publication edited by Condé Nast beginning in 1913, which would ultimately be merged into Nast's larger venture Vogue in 1936—all four were published independently with no relation to each other. The Vanity Fair name was revived by Condé Nast as its own magazine in 1983, making it the fifth magazine to use the name and only one still in print.

Vanity Fair is notably a fictitious place ruled by Beelzebub in the book The Pilgrim's Progress by John Bunyan. Later use of the name was influenced by the well-known 1847–48 novel of the same name by William Makepeace Thackeray.

== Vanity Fair (1859–1863), American ==
The first magazine bearing the name Vanity Fair appeared in New York as a humorous weekly, from 1859 to 1863. The magazine was financed by Frank J. Thompson, and was edited by William Allen Stephens and Henry Louis Stephens. The magazine's stature may be indicated by its contributors, which included Thomas Bailey Aldrich, William Dean Howells, Fitz-James O'Brien and Charles Farrar Browne.

== Vanity Fair (1868–1914), British ==
The second Vanity Fair was published from 1868 to 1914 in Britain as a weekly magazine. Subtitled "A Weekly Show of Political, Social and Literary Wares", it was founded by Thomas Gibson Bowles, who aimed to expose the contemporary vanities of Victorian society. Colonel Fred Burnaby provided £100 of the original £200 capital, and suggested the title Vanity Fair after Thackeray's popular satire on British society. The first issue appeared in London on November 7, 1868. It offered its readership articles on fashion, current events, the theatre, books, social events and the latest scandals, together with serial fiction, word games and other trivia.

Bowles wrote much of the magazine himself under various pseudonyms such as "Jehu Junior", but contributors included Lewis Carroll, Willie Wilde, P. G. Wodehouse, Jessie Pope and Bertram Fletcher Robinson, with the latter editor from June 1904 to October 1906.

A full-page color lithograph of a contemporary celebrity or dignitary appeared in most issues, and it is for these caricatures that Vanity Fair is best known today. Subjects included artists, athletes, royalty, statesmen, scientists, authors, actors, soldiers, religious personalities, business people and scholars. More than two thousand of these images appeared, and they are considered the chief cultural legacy of the magazine, forming a pictorial record of the period.

The final issue of the British Vanity Fair appeared on February 5, 1914.

== Vanity Fair (1902–1904), American ==
The Commonwealth Publishing Company of 110 West 42nd Street, New York City published Vanity Fair, also a weekly magazine. The publisher was incorporated in February 1902 and went into bankruptcy in April 1904.

== Vanity Fair (1913–1936), American ==
Another American Vanity Fair was edited by Condé Montrose Nast from 1913 until 1936, when it was merged into Vogue.

== Vanity Fair (1983–present), American ==
Nast's magazine was revived in 1983 by Condé Nast Publications. The current Vanity Fair is a monthly American magazine of pop culture, fashion, and politics published by Condé Nast Publications.
