= Elphin, County Roscommon =

Town in County Roscommon, Ireland

Elphin Ail Finn
- Town
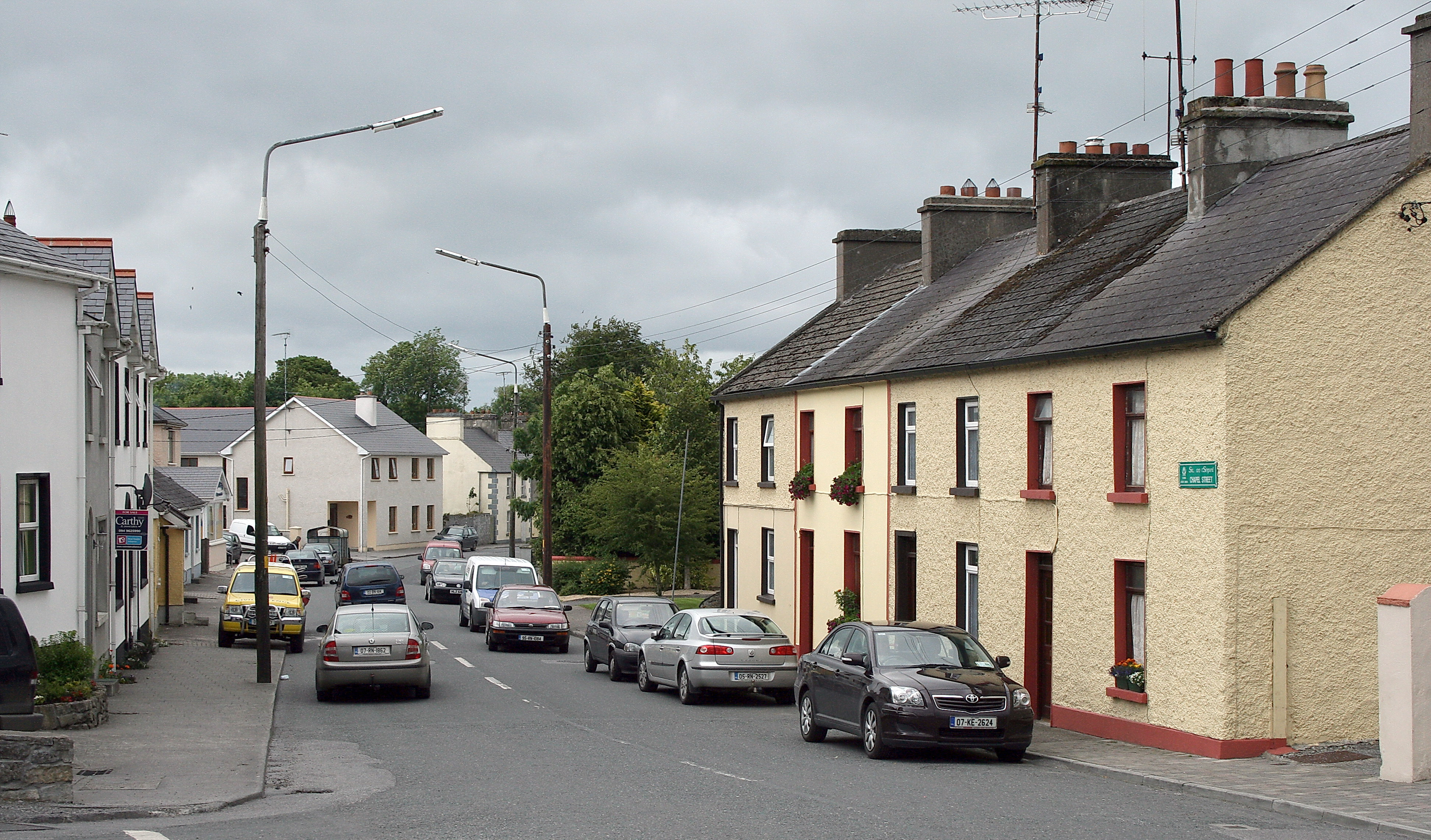
- Chapel Street, Elphin

- Location in Ireland
- Coordinates: 53°51′N 8°12′W
- Country: Ireland
- Province: Connacht
- County: County Roscommon
- Elevation: 83 m (272 ft)

Population (2022)
  - Total: 715
- Time zone: UTC+0 (WET)
  - Summer (DST): UTC-1 (IST (WEST))
- Irish Grid Reference: M868889

Elphin (el-FIN; Irish: Ail Finn) is a small town in north County Roscommon, Ireland. It forms the southern tip of a triangle with Boyle 18 km (11 mi) and Carrick-on-Shannon 14 km (9 mi) to the north west and north east respectively. It is at the junction of the R368 and R369 regional roads. Ireland West Airport is 50 km (31 mi) west of Elphin - approximately 40 minutes by road. The town is in a townland and civil parish of the same name.

== Public transport access ==
The town is served by Local Link route 570 a few times daily linking it to Boyle, Strokestown and Roscommon. Until 2012 Elphin was served by some Bus Éireann Expressway journeys on the Ballina to Dublin route. Bus Éireann route 468 was introduced to compensate for the loss of the Expressway service and links the town to Strokestown and Carrick-on-Shannon on Mondays, Wednesdays & Saturdays. On Fridays the Bus Éireann Ballina to Longford bus, route 451, serves Elphin.

== History ==
Elphin has historically been an important market town and the diocesan centre for the Diocese of Elphin. St Patrick is believed to have visited Elphin, consecrated its first church and ordained its first bishop, Asicus (subsequently the patron saint of Elphin). Information supporting the visitation of St Patrick is to be found in two important memorials of early Irish hagiography, the Vita Tripartita of St Patrick, and the "Patrician Documents" in the Book of Armagh. On his missionary tour through Connacht in 434 or 435, St Patrick came to the territory of Corcoghlan, present day Elphin. The chief of that territory, a noble Druid named Ono, gave land and afterwards his castle or fort to St Patrick to found a church and monastery. The place, which had hitherto been called Emlagh-Ono (a derivation of its owners name) received the designation of Ail Finn, which means "rock of the clear spring". It derives from a story of St Patrick raising a large stone from a well opened by him in the land of Ono and placed on its margin. A copious stream of crystal water flowed from the well and continues to flow through Elphin to this day. St Patrick built a church called Tempull Phadruig (Patrick's church) and established an Episcopal See in Elphin. St Asicus remained as bishop of Elphin. St Patrick also founded an episcopal monastery or college at Elphin, believed to be one of the first monasteries founded by him. In pre-Reformation times, Elphin was host to a large number of religious orders and was a religious centre of international significance. This is supported by the appearance of Elphin in a number of pan-European maps in the Middle Ages.

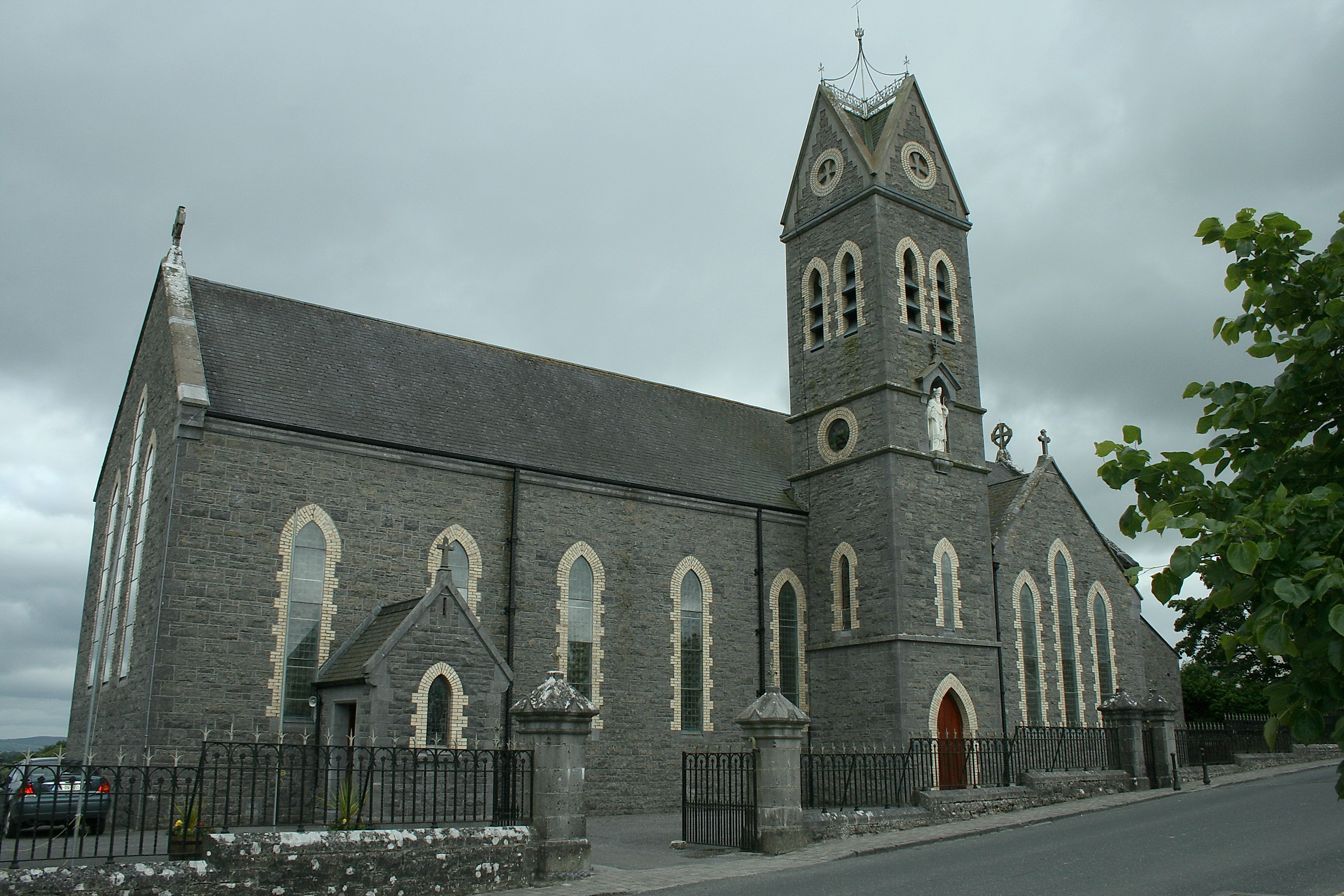
Elphin Church

After the Reformation Elphin continued as the centre of a bishopric. A new bishop's residence was built in the 1720s to the central block and flanking pavilions plan that is very common in Irish country houses of this period. The main block of the bishop's house was destroyed by fire early in the 20th century and was subsequently demolished, but the ruins of the pavilions survive together with the curtain walls that linked them to the main house.

The Church of Ireland cathedral was also rebuilt in the eighteenth century. It was a modest building, no bigger than a small parish church, with a tall square clock tower at its west end. An apse was added in the 19th century. The cathedral was used for worship up to 1961. It was badly damaged in a storm on 4 February 1957 and was demolished a few years later, but its partially restored ruins can still be seen.

Associated with the cathedral was Elphin Diocesan School, popularly known as 'The Latin School'. Its most famous students were Oliver Goldsmith and the eye surgeon Sir William Wilde, father of Oscar Wilde. The school was closed in the 1860s when the seat of the bishopric was moved to Kilmore, County Cavan.

According to legend, it was close to Elphin that the mythological figure of Oisin fell from his horse upon his return from Tír na nÓg (The Land of Eternal Youth). Within 6 km of Elphin is Cruachan (otherwise Rathcroghan), the famous palace of Queen Meave (she of the Táin Bó Cúailnge and a prominent figure in Irish mythology, notably the Ulster Cycle) and the Connacht kings. The well of Ogulla (otherwise the Virgin Monument), scene of the famous conversion and baptism of Aithnea (Eithne) and Fidelm, the daughters of Leoghari, monarch of Ireland in the time of St Patrick, is also situate near Elphin. It is reputed that the gold and riches of Ned Kelly are buried in foothills just outside Elphin.

Efforts to bring rail to Elphin in the 19th Century The proposal for a railway connection between Elphin and Swinford Co.Mayo, (a likely effort to have a Longford to Ballina line) were presented before the house of Lord in Westminster in the same year as the Castlerea-Castlebar railway line extension proposal were seeking approval. The Proposal failed before the house of lords in the early months of 1859, while the Castlerea- Castlebar line did gain approval at the house of commons. The Irish Times noted that plans were in place to go before the house of Commons, with expectations that there might be less opposition than in the house of Lords. Ref. 'Elphin to Swinford railway', The Irish Times, March 31 1859 Pg. 1

== Windmill ==
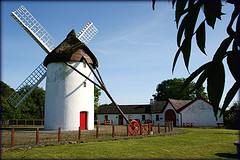
Elphin windmill

An early 18th century windmill has been restored in the village. The windmill was built between 1720 - 1740. Some accounts state that the windmill was no longer in use and had fallen into disrepair by 1830. This timeline is corroborated by the "School's Collection" from the National Folklore Collection, a national survey of local folklore conducted by the schoolchildren of Ireland (including Elphin) dating from May 1938. One entry related to the windmill in Elphin states "There is a windmill about a quarter of a mile on the north-side of the town. It is in the village of Chanterland and it is on the left-hand side of the road as a person goes from Elphin to Boyle. It is a circular structure and it was well built because although it is very old it is as good as when it was built. There are two doors on it one facing the other but one is filled with stones. There is a stream going by the mill and where the Boyle road crosses it is called The Mill Dam. The stream rises in the Deanery and it flows in an eastern direction. There are none of the mill stones to be seen around the Mill. A man named Culligan who died fifteen years ago said that the Windmill was not worked for eighty years before that".

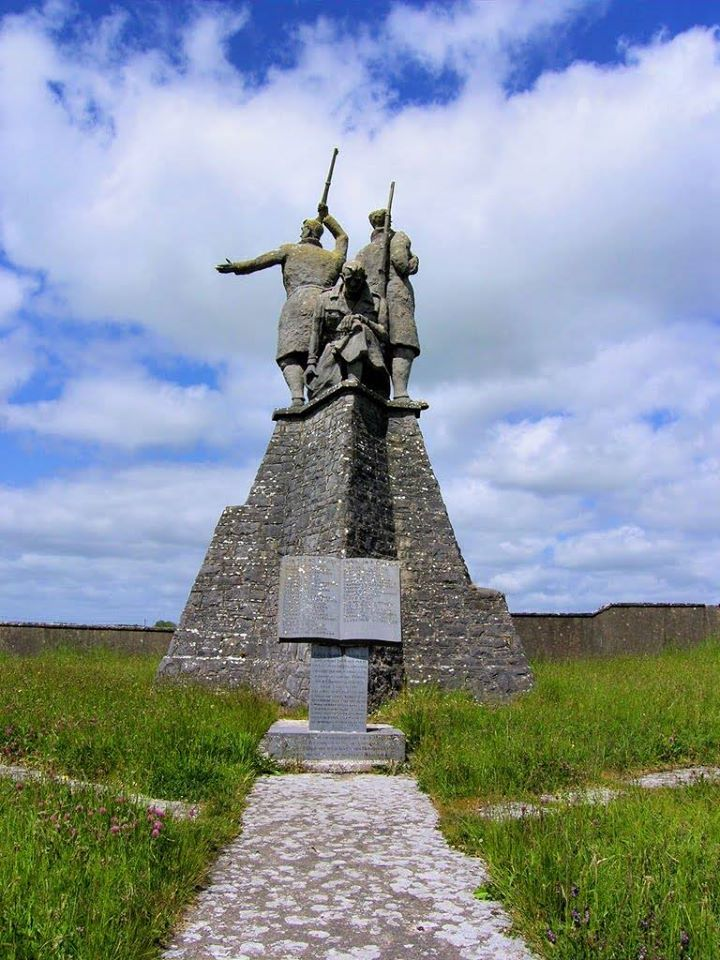
War of Independence Commemorative Military Memorial at Shankill Cross near Elphin

== People ==
- Percy French (1854–1920), the performer, poet, and water colour artist, was born at Cloonyquin, approximately three miles outside of Elphin
- Arthur Murphy (1727–1805), lawyer, playwright and biographer of Samuel Johnson, Henry Fielding, and David Garrick
- Oliver Goldsmith (1728–1774) spent much of his childhood at Ballyoughter immediately south of Elphin and may have been born at his mother's family home, Smith Hill, just outside the village of Elphin
- Roderick Flanagan (1828–1862), Australian-Irish journalist, historian, and anthropologist
- Patrick O'Dowd (1892–1968), former Fianna Fáil TD (Roscommon) and dispensary doctor
- Luke O'Connor (1831–1915), the first soldier who won Victoria Cross for his actions at the Battle of Alma during the Crimean War, was born at Hillstreet, very near to Elphin
- Patrick Roddy (1827–1895), soldier and recipient of the Victoria Cross
- James O'Moran (1735–1794), an Irish général de division in French service, who was guillotined during the Reign of Terror

== See also ==
- Bishop of Elphin
- List of towns and villages in Ireland.
