= Ballyoughter =

House in County Roscommon, Ireland

Ballyoughter is an 18th-century house and park situated about 1.5 km south of Elphin, County Roscommon, Ireland.

The earliest historical reference to Ballyoughter is in the Annals of Connaught which records that in 1542 Ulick Burke of Clanrickarde ‘took’ the residence of O Flannigan at Ballyoughter while on a military expedition in ‘Lower Connaught’.

The Goldsmith family acquired land at Ballyoughter in the 17th century. According to Prior, Robert Goldsmith the grandfather of the poet, playwright and novelist Oliver Goldsmith was the first of the family to settle at Ballyoughter. Charles Goldsmith the poet's father was born at Ballyoughter in 1690. Oliver Goldsmith lived at Ballyoughter with his uncle John Goldsmith for two years in the 1730s while he attended Elphin Diocesan School. It is believed that it was at Ballyoughter that he heard the blind harpist and composer Turlough O'Carolan often referred to as the last of the Irish bards.

The Goldsmiths continued in possession of Ballyoughter until 1883 when another John Goldsmith sold the property.

Also in the parish of Elphin is Smith Hill where Oliver Goldsmith's mother Anne Jones was born.
