= Galway City Ring Road =

Proposed road in Galway, Ireland

N6 Galway City Ring Road
- N6 Cuarbhóthar Chathair na Gaillimhe

Route information
- Length: 18 km (11 mi)
- Status: Proposed

Major junctions
- From: Bearna
- J1 → R336 – Coast Road J5 → N59 road J6 → N84 road J7 → N83 road J8 → M6 motorway/N67 road
- To: Doughiska

Location
- Country: Ireland
- Primary destinations: Knocknacarra, Dangan, Menlo, Castlegar, Ballybrit

Highway system
- Roads in Ireland; Motorways; Primary; Secondary; Regional

The N6 Galway City Ring Road (also known as the Galway Bypass) is a proposed road in Ireland, designed to bypass Galway City and reduce traffic congestion. First proposed in 1999, the planned development has been subject to some controversy and debate.

== Background ==
Galway has a history of traffic congestion. In 1984, construction started on the current N6 to alleviate the problem, which was completed in 1987. Since then, the city has grown and the current N6 no longer meets demand.

== History ==
Consultants were first appointed in 1999 to carry out a feasibility study for an earlier iteration of the project, named the N6 Galway City Outer Bypass. On 1 December 2006, this scheme was submitted to An Bord Pleanala for approval. On 28 November 2008, An Bord Pleanala granted approval for a section of the project, but not for the section passing through Tonabrocky Bog. Progress was halted after a series of judicial reviews, and in 2013 the planning process for the project was effectively reset.

After a lengthy and contentious consultation process, a "preferred corridor" was identified in 2015 and a new planning application was submitted. Following a prolonged assessment, the project was approved in 2021 but quashed soon after for failing to properly account for the State's updated climate legislation.

In April 2025, the proposal was revised and resubmitted, before subsequently being granted approval by An Coimisiún Pleanála on 9 April 2026.

=== Developments ===
As of November 2026, construction had not yet commenced, although the four judicial reviews that had hampered progress were recently withdrawn. The road was included in the Critical Infrastructure Act 2026, and forms part of the wider Galway Transport Strategy. Funding for the scheme was included as part of 2027 Irish budget and the project is set to proceed, with the procurement process to be completed in 2027, together with the start of enabling works, with major construction expected to begin in 2028.

== Route ==
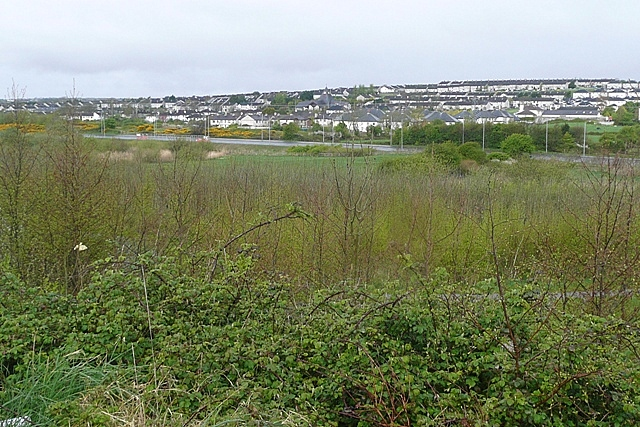
Proposed construction area

The proposed N6 Galway City Ring Road is approximately 18 km long and will connect the existing N6 at Coolagh Junction in Doughiska in the east of the city with the R336 Coast Road west of Bearna. The route consists of both dual and single carriageway sections, as well as several tunnels, viaducts and a bridge over the River Corrib.

Starting at Coolagh Junction, the road will proceed westwards, passing through the Galway Racecourse Tunnel to an interchange with the N83 Tuam Road. From there it will run through Castlegar, meet at a junction with the N84 Headford Road and onto another tunnel, passing beneath the Lackagh Quarry. After that, it will run on a 320m viaduct through Menlo and onto a 620m long bridge across the River Corrib, continuing on through Dangan and Bushypark to Letteragh Junction, with a link road connecting it to Knocknacarra and the N59. After a crossroads with the Ballymoneen Road, it will continue on as a single carriageway with another junction at the Cappagh Road and a roundabout in Bearna East before finally finishing at the R336 Coast Road, approximately 2 km west of Bearna village.

== Controversy ==
Critics argue that the proposed road would be in breach of climate legislation and the funding could be better spent on public transport and active travel. Another concern is that the road will not fix the traffic congestion and may instead induce additional car traffic, thereby increasing carbon emissions.

=== Environment ===
The route passes through the Lough Corrib SAC. There have been concerns that the road will destroy the habitat and negatively impact wildlife and biodiversity.

In Tonabrocky, the proposed alignment had to be changed due to the presence of protected bog cotton.

=== Local amenities and property ===
There have been concerns among locals over the loss of local amenities at Dangan Park, which the route passes through.

If built as planned, approximately 50 homes could be slated for demolition, and there has been some controversy over the compulsory purchase order (CPO) process.

=== Route selection and urban sprawl ===
The public consultation and the route selection process undertaken in 2015, generated significant controversy, attracting hundreds of objections to the chosen alignment. Opponents fear that the construction of the chosen route will contribute to further urban sprawl around the city and unsustainable development.

=== Legal challenges ===
Following the partial approval in 2008, two High Court challenges were launched. One of these was later appealed to the Supreme Court in 2013, and following intervention by the European Court of Justice, the Supreme Court sided against the project.

After the revival and subsequent approval of the project in 2021, three judicial reviews were brought against An Bord Pleanála. In 2023, the High Court ruled that the approval was in breach of environmental legislation and the planning application was remitted for fresh consideration.

In 2026, after the application was reconsidered and approval was granted for the third time, four new High Court judicial-review applications were filed by the deadline of 17 June 2026. The High Court hearings were set to take place in November 2026. However, in October 2026, three of the four challenges were settled in the High Court. The fourth challenge was withdrawn on 2 November 2026, thus allowing the project to proceed.

== See also ==
- M6 motorway
- Roads in Ireland
- National primary road
- Transport Infrastructure Ireland
- List of road protests in the United Kingdom and Ireland
- Proposed light rail developments for Galway City
- Bridges over the River Corrib
