= T. G. Wilson =

Anglo-Irish surgeon and author

T.G. Wilson FRCSI FRCSE FRCS FACS FRSM MRIA HRHA
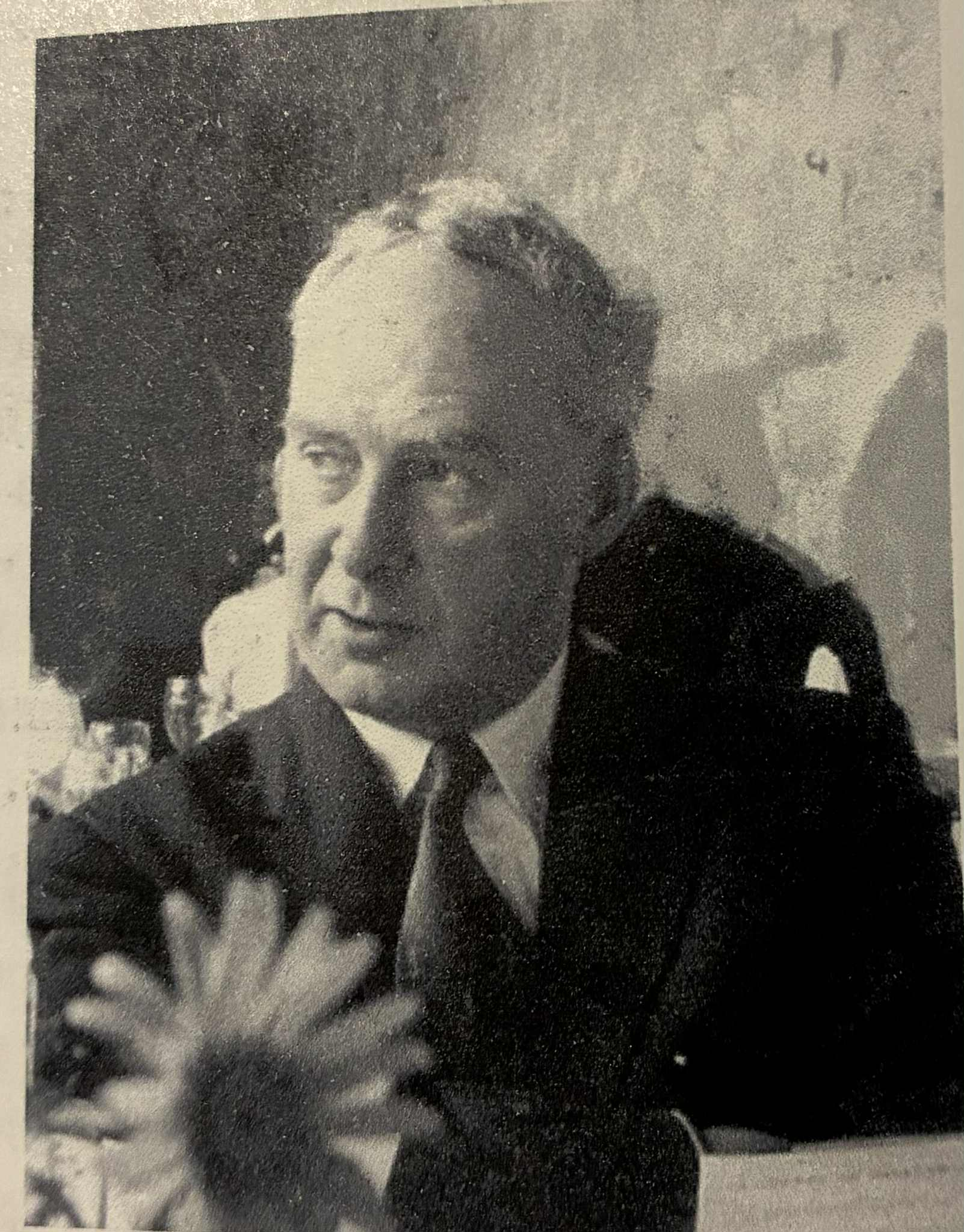
- Wilson in his Dublin studio

Chairman of the Commissioners of the Irish Lights
- In office 1968–1969
- Preceded by: J.C. Colvill, R.N.

President of the Royal College of Surgeons in Ireland
- In office 1958–1961
- Preceded by: Anthony Burton Clery
- Succeeded by: Alexander Kinnear

Personal details
- Born: Thomas George Wilson; 1 July 1901 Belfast, Ireland
- Died: 6 November 1969 (aged 68) London, England
- Education: Trinity College, Dublin

Thomas George Wilson FRCSI FRCSE FRCS FACS FRSM MRIA HRHA (1 July 1901 – 6 November 1969) was an eminent Anglo-Irish surgeon and medical administrator specialising in otorhinolaryngology, a field to which he made significant contributions. Wilson was also an accomplished author, artist and sailor. He was known as "T.G." and was a leading figure in Dublin society until his sudden death in 1969.

In the Second World War, he served with MI9, a secret branch of the British Directorate of Military Intelligence. He was the organiser of an escape and evasion organisation in Ireland, known to officials as the 'Escape Club', to ferry stranded Royal Air Force personnel from the Curragh Camp, in neutral Ireland across the border back to the UK.

== Early life and education ==
Wilson was born at Maryville Park in Belfast on 1 July 1901 to Robert Charles Wilson, a stockbroker and nephew of Walter Henry Wilson, founding partner of Harland and Wolff, and Frances Lucinda Kellett, of distant kin to Sir Henry Kellett. He had two other siblings, an elder brother Charles Herbert, and a younger sister, Frances Edna, who went on to marry Sir Charles Read.

It was often thought that Wilson was the natural son of Oscar Wilde - the suggestion was spurred on by his academic interest in Sir William Wilde, Oscar's father, but the suggestion – which was widespread in Dublin society at the time – was denied by Wilson, who stated in 1942, 'I've often been called a bastard, but whatever I am I'm not a Wilde bastard.' The confusion is probably explained by the fact that Sir William Wilde had a natural son called Dr Henry Wilson. The Wilsons and the Wildes were related matrilineally.

He was educated at briefly at Eton College and then Mountjoy School (now merged to form part of Mount Temple Comprehensive School) and Trinity College, Dublin.

== Surgical career ==
Wilson was appointed house surgeon to the ENT Department of the Cheltenham General and Eye Hospital. He subsequently took the examination for the fellowship of the Royal College of Surgeons in Ireland (FRCSI) in 1927. Following this, he was appointed assistant surgeon to Thomas Graham at the Royal City of Dublin Hospital (Baggot Street). Various consultant/specialist appointments followed this: at Dr Steevens' Hospital, at Drumcondra Hospital, The National Children's Hospital, Harcourt Street, and from 1928 to 1966 Wilson was laryngologist at Mercer's Hospital. Wilson was also a consultant to the Royal Hospital, Donnybrook from 1935 to 1969, honorary aurist to the Mageaugh Home, Dublin, and laryngologist to the Royal National Hospital for Consumption, Newcastle (County Wicklow). He was also in charge of a private practice whilst holding many consulting posts (the majority of which were honorary).

He was made a fellow of the Royal Academy of Medicine in Ireland and founded its section on the History of Medicine in January 1956, where he was honorary secretary until 1963 – at which point he became president of the section. Wilson had previously been president of the section of Laryngology and Otology (1946–48). He was elected a member of the Royal Irish Academy and a fellow of the Royal Society of Medicine in London in 1937. However, Wilson was most influential within the Royal College of Surgeons in Ireland, whose council he joined in 1944. He became vice president in 1956, remaining in the role until 1957. In 1958, he became president, where he served a record three years as president from 1958 to 1961. After becoming the longest-serving president, he then became secretary and honorary librarian in 1962. Whilst president, Wilson oversaw the creation of the Faculty of Anaesthetists in 1959 and the Faculty of Radiologists in 1960. Wilson also helped to arrange international reciprocal agreements with other bodies.

== Honours, awards and legacy ==
Wilson was awarded honorary fellowships of the Royal College of Surgeons of Edinburgh in 1961, the Royal College of Surgeons of England in 1963 and the American College of Surgeons in 1963. He delivered the Felix Semon Lecture at the University of London in 1964. He was elected a member of the James IV Association of Surgeons (founded in 1965) and President of the section of Laryngology of the Royal Society of Medicine in 1966. He also served as President of the Collegium Oto-Rhino-Laryngologicum Amicitiae Sacrum (CORLAS), an international group of scientists, during its 1958 Dublin meeting. He was also a founder member and first President of the Irish Otolaryngological Society in 1970. The T.G. Wilson Medal is named after him. Wilson was also awarded honorary membership of the Royal Hibernian Academy (RHA) as well as a professorship of anatomy at the National College of Art and Design.

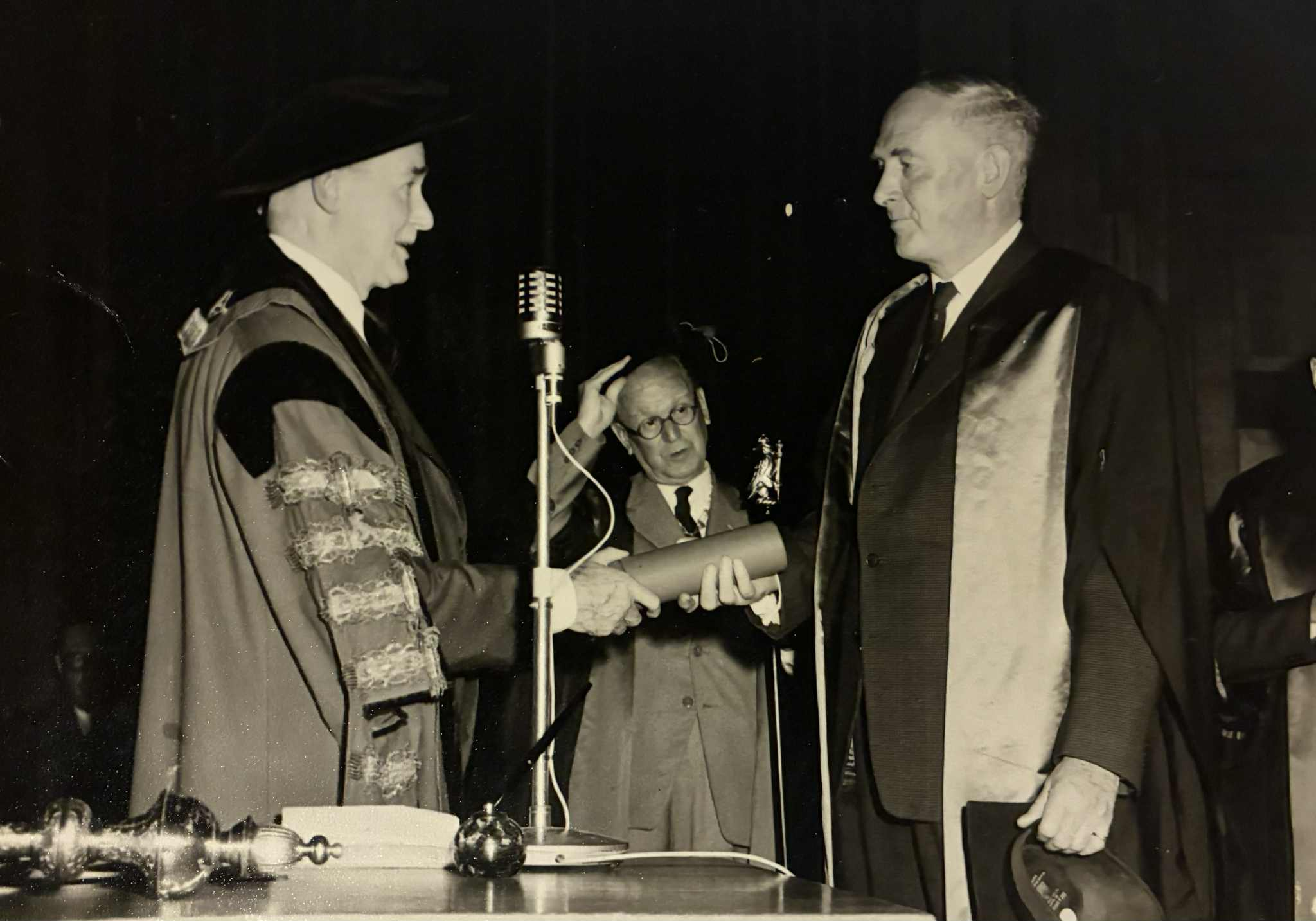
Mr T. G. Wilson receiving his diploma of Honorary Fellowship of the Royal College of Surgeons in England from the President, with Sir Clement Price Thomas, Vice-President, in the background.

He became chairman of the Commissioners of Irish Lights in 1968, having previously been a commissioner, and subsequently wrote the Irish Lighthouse Service, which featured drawings and colour plates of his oil paintings. For his literary and art achievements, Wilson was awarded an honorary Doctorate of Literature in 1941 by Dublin University. During his career, Wilson published various articles arguing in favour of the claim that Jonathan Swift suffered from Ménière's disease, which is now widely accepted by the medical circle.

== Personal life ==
In 1928, he married Mary Hume Babington, daughter of The Rt Hon. Sir Anthony Babington, with whom he had two sons and two daughters. His eldest son, Anthony Babington Wilson, is a former business executive, artist and author.

Wilson was subject to legal repercussions in 1942 when he was found to be hindering the arrest of a person liable to internment during the neutrality of the Irish Free State in the Second World War. He was part of a group that assisted British servicemen stranded in Ireland to escape across the border to Belfast. He was fined £200 and sentenced to 12 months in prison, which was subsequently suspended on the agreement of a personal bail of £500. His barrister was JA Costello, who later became Taoiseach.

Wilson died suddenly of a heart attack on 6 November 1969 when staying at the Royal Hospital, Chelsea.

== Publications ==
- Victorian Doctor: the Life of Sir William Wilde (London: Methuen & Co. Ltd, 1942)
- The mental and physical health of Dean Swift (Norwich: Jarrold and Sons Ltd., 1958)
- The death masks of Dean Swift (Norwich: Jarrold and Sons Ltd., 1960)
- Diseases of the Ears, Nose and Throat in Children (London and New York: William Heinnemann Medical Books Ltd 1955 & Grune & Stratton 1962)
- The Irish Lighthouse Service (Dublin: A. Figgis, 1968)
