= N6 road (Ireland) =

Road in Ireland

N6 road
- Bóthar N6

Route information
- Length: 147.99 km (91.96 mi)

Location
- Country: Ireland
- Primary destinations: (bypassed routes in italics): County Meath; M4; Kinnegad; County Westmeath; Rochfordbridge; Tyrrellspass (+N52); Kilbeggan (-N52); Horseleap; Moate; Fardrum (N62); Athlone (N55, N61); County Roscommon; Monksland; Drum; Ballydangan; County Galway; Ballinasloe; Aughrim; Kilreekil; Kilmeen (N65); Loughrea; Athenry; Craughwell; Oranmore; Galway † (N59, N83)

Highway system
- Roads in Ireland; Motorways; Primary; Secondary; Regional

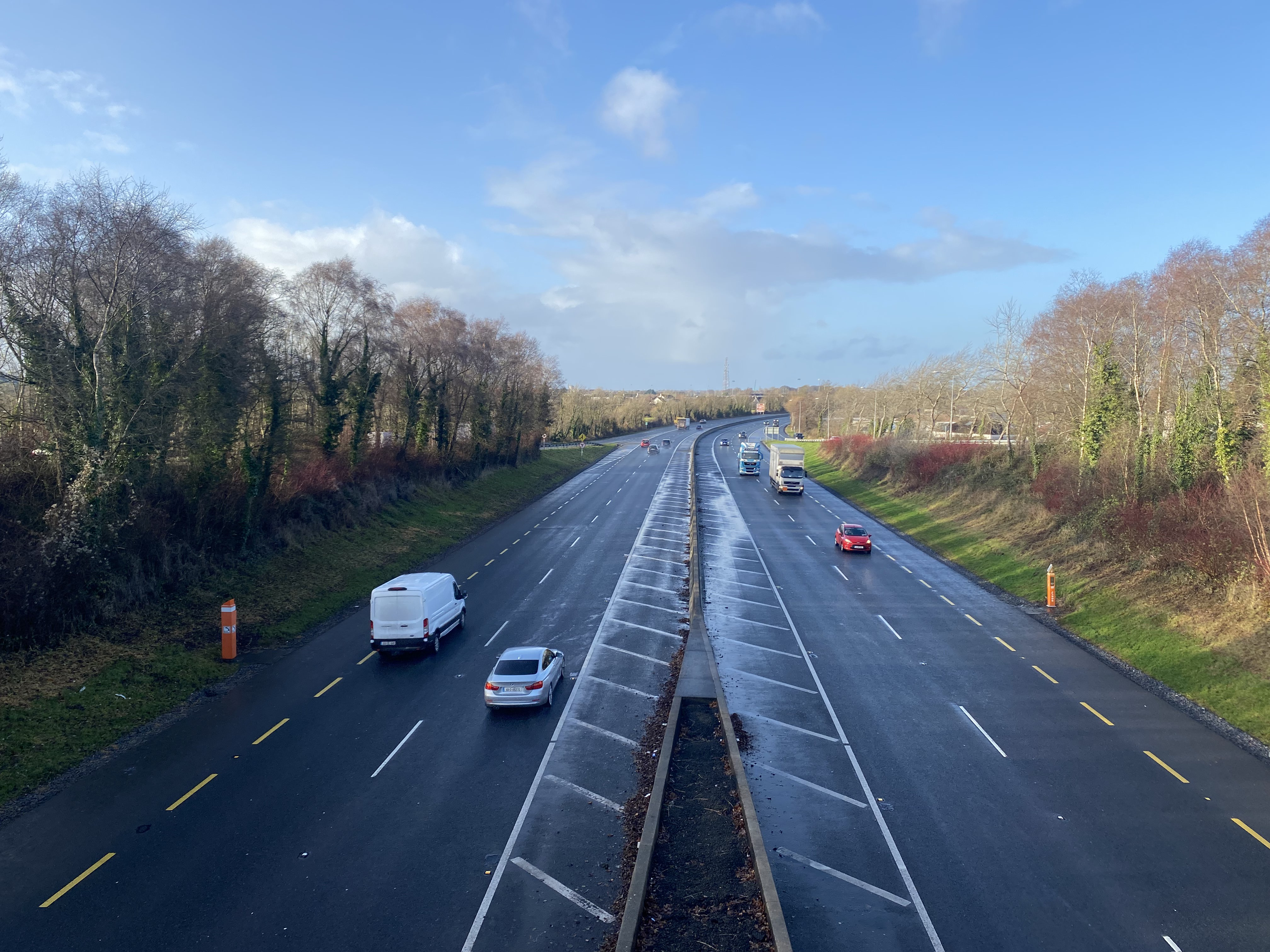
N6 at Athlone, 2022

The N6 road is a national primary road in Ireland from junction 11 on the M4 motorway at Kinnegad to Galway city. The N6 and N4 form a continuous motorway or dual carriageway from Dublin city centre to Galway City, passing in an east–west direction through the midlands of Ireland. Most of the road is motorway standard (designated as M6 motorway) except the Athlone bypass and stretches of urban road in Galway City, which are the only sections of the road that remain designated as N6 dual carriageway. There is one toll on the road outside Galway City. Major upgrades to the road were completed in December 2009, completing the first intercity motorway/dual carriageway in Ireland, and the New Junctions of the M6 are built and will be 164 km.

== History ==
Before the 2005–2009 construction of the road currently designated as the N6, the designation applied to the older, parallel Dublin–Galway route which went directly through most of the now bypassed towns from Kinnegad to Galway. That route is now mostly designated as R446, except the Athlone bypass, which forms part of the new N6, a small section near Athlone now part of the N62 and a small section near Loughrea now part of the N65.

== Route ==
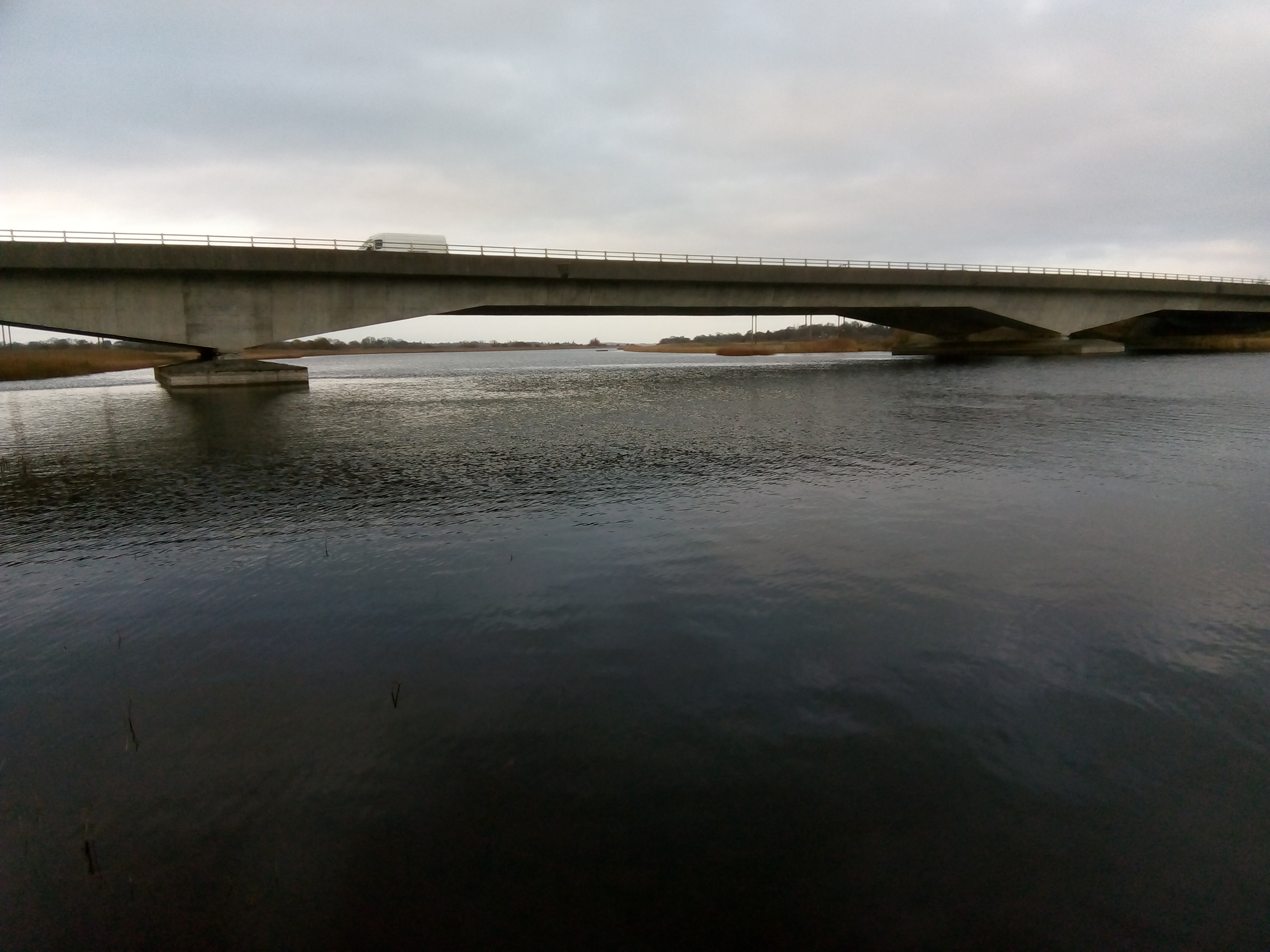
The N6 crossing the River Shannon north of Athlone.

The N6 route commences directly south of Kinnegad in County Meath as the M6 motorway. The road runs west into County Westmeath and bypasses Rochfordbridge, with the N52 joining the M6 east of Tyrrellspass. The N6 continues west, with the N52 leaving the route south of Kilbeggan. The route leaves Westmeath after bypassing Horseleap, continues west into County Offaly, and re-enters Westmeath, bypassing Moate.

The route bypasses Fardrum (where the N62 begins, leaving the N6 to the south) heading west towards Athlone. The route follows a dual carriageway bypass of Athlone around the northern side of the town, crossing the River Shannon into County Roscommon. This part of the route is non-motorway standard. Along the dual carriageway there are local access junctions, as well as junctions for the N55 and N61.

After the Athlone bypass, the route continues as the M6, and motorway restrictions again apply. The route bypasses Ballinasloe over River Suck into County Galway. The N6 bypasses west through Aughrim and Kilreekil. Further west at Kilmeen, the N65 commences, leaving the M6 to the south. Loughrea is bypassed to the north by a route opened in November 2005. The River Dunkellin crosses the M6 at Craughwell as it continues west towards Galway. Outside the city itself, Oranmore is bypassed to the west and north, where the M18 crosses the M6. This dual carriageway bypass brings the route into Galway itself, where it meets the N83 along Bóthar na dTreabh. The Headford Road, Quincentenary Bridge across the River Corrib and Quincentenary Bridge Approach Road bring the N6 through Galway itself to meet the N59 on the western side of the city.

== Junctions ==
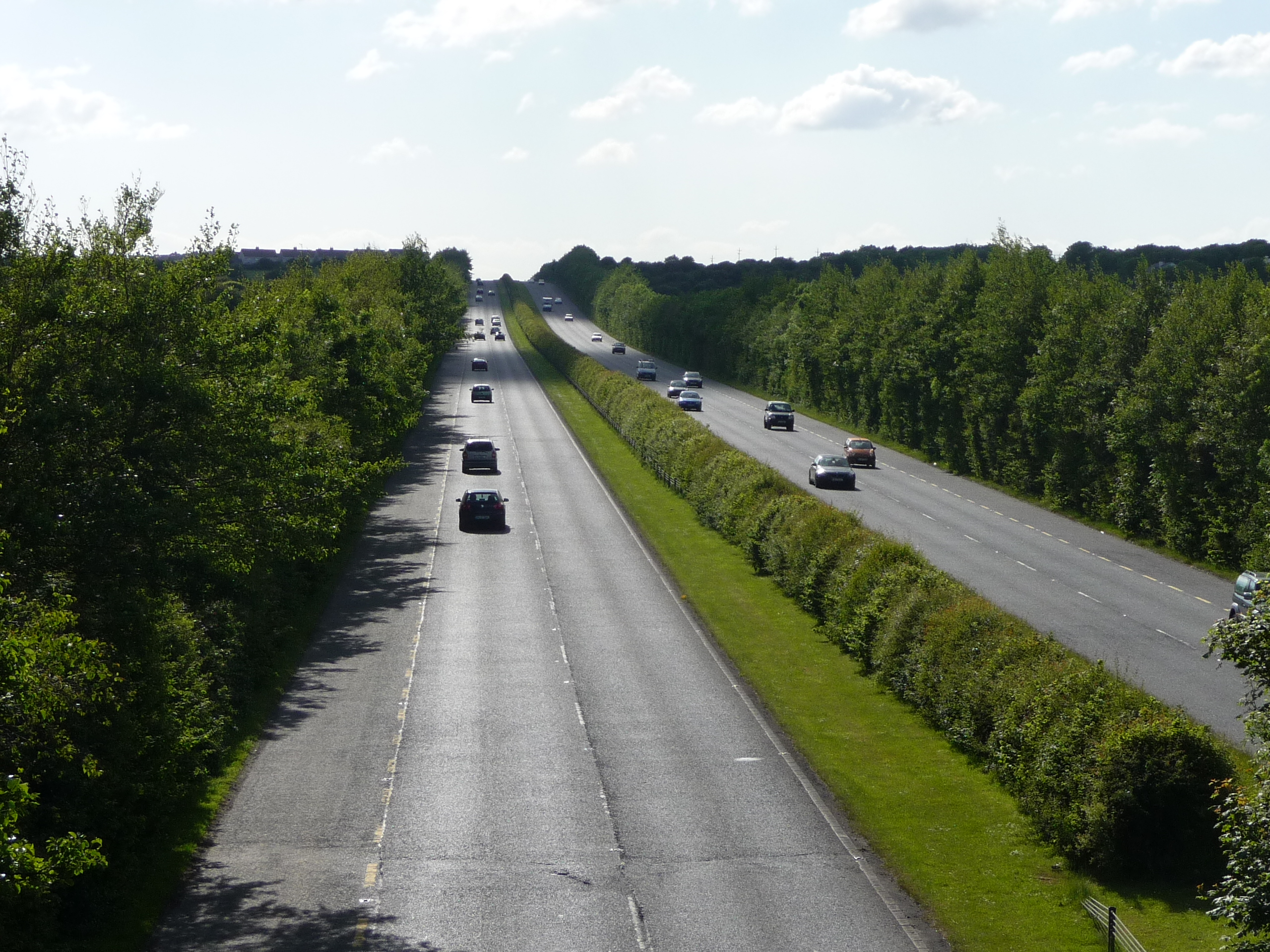
Looking West: N67 Dual Carriageway (Old N6) between Oranmore and Ballybrit in Galway.

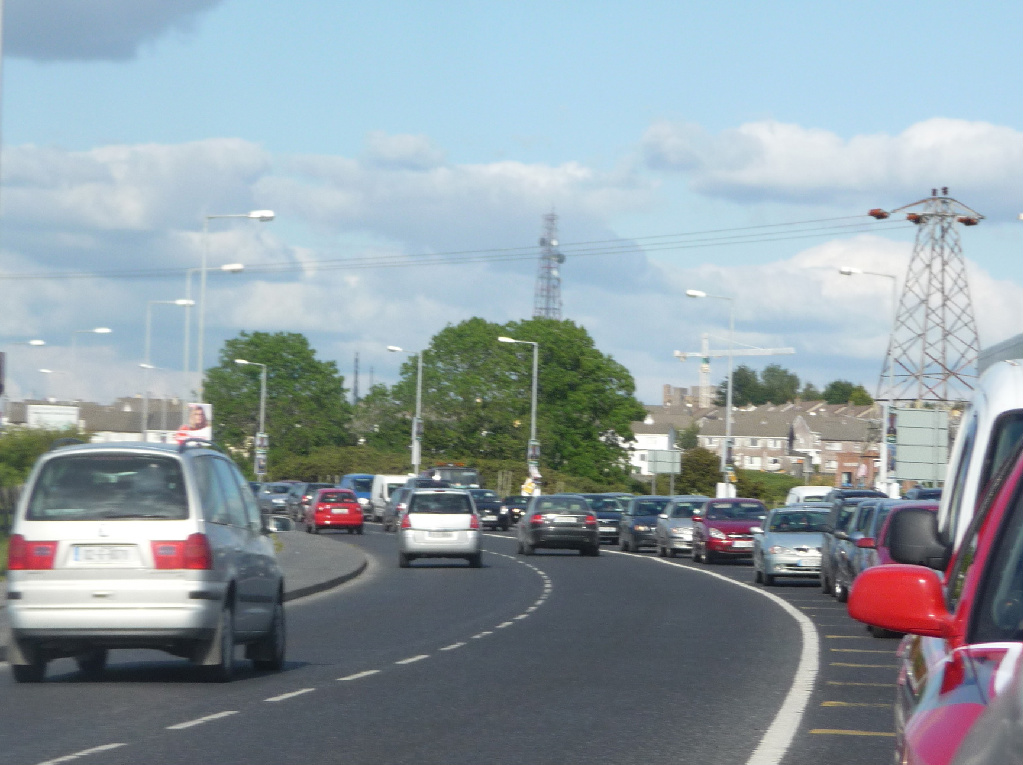
Late evening traffic on the N6 in Galway City.

The M6 junction numbers below are used on the entire length of the road. The Athlone bypass had a separate numbering scheme (J1–J6) but was renumbered to its current form (J8–J13) following the upgrade of the bypass in 2011.

Junctions 1–8 and 14–18 form part of the M6 motorway.

County	km	mi	Junction	Destinations	Notes
County Westmeath	58	36	8	N62 ‒ Athlone (East), Birr	Continues as M6 motorway.
County Westmeath	59.5	36.9	9	R916 – Blyry Industrial Estate N55 ‒ Cavan, Longford	
County Westmeath	61.5	38.2	10	N55 ‒ Cavan, Longford, Athlone	
County Westmeath	62.5	38.8	11	L4023 ‒ Athlone, Coosan	Tullamore (N52)
County Roscommon	64.5	40.1	12	N61 ‒ Sligo, Roscommon	LILO junction.
County Roscommon	65.5	40.7	13	R362 ‒ Athlone (West), Monksland, Athleague, Tuam	LILO junction. Continues as M6 motorway.
J14-18 part of M6 motorway.
County Galway	137	85.1	19	R381 ‒ Claregalway, Oranmore	Continues as M6 motorway.
County Galway	140.5	87.3	20	N67 ‒ Ennistimon, Galway (East)	Galway Docks; Motorway terminates at roundabout. Continues as N6 dual carriageway (Bóthar na dTreabh).
1.000 mi = 1.609 km; 1.000 km = 0.621 mi: Route transition

== See also ==
- Roads in Ireland
- Motorways in Ireland
- National secondary road
- Regional road
- Galway City Ring Road
