= Dorothy Wilde =

English socialite (1895–1941)

Dolly Wilde
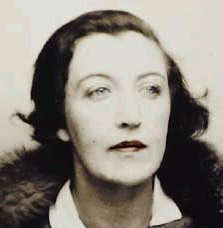
- Born: Dorothy Ierne Wilde; 11 July 1895; London
- Died: 10 April 1941 (aged 45); England
- Occupation: Socialite
- Partner: Natalie Clifford Barney
- Father: Willie Wilde

Dorothy Ierne Wilde (11 July 1895 – 10 April 1941), known as Dolly Wilde, was an English socialite, made famous by her family connections and her reputation as a witty conversationalist. Her charm and humour made her a popular guest at salons in Paris between the wars, standing out even in a social circle known for its flamboyant talkers.

== Life ==
=== Early life ===
Wilde, born in London three months after her uncle Oscar Wilde's arrest for homosexual acts, was the only child of Oscar's older brother, Willie, and his second wife, Sophie Lily Lees. Though Wilde had never met her uncle, she idolized him far more than she did her own father, who was alcoholic and died just a few years after her birth in 1899.

This left her under the care of her mother and stepfather, translator Alexander Teixeira de Mattos, though at the time, her mother was “so impoverished that she could not afford to keep her at home” and sent young Wilde away to what she described as a “country convent.” Wilde spoke little of her childhood, with only one story ever told. As recorded by Parisian raconteuse Bettina Bergery, “when Dolly was very young, she used to like to take lumps of sugar, dip them in her pretty mother Lily's perfume, and eat them.”

=== World War I ===
In 1914, she travelled to France in order to drive an ambulance in World War I. About 1917 or 1918, while both were living in Paris, she had an affair with one of her fellow ambulance drivers, Standard Oil heiress Marion "Joe" Carstairs, who in the 1920s became a speedboat racer and was known as "the fastest woman on water." Although she "revelled in" attracting both men and women, Wilde was a lesbian.

=== Addictions and later life ===
Wilde drank to excess and was addicted to heroin. She went through several detoxification attempts, none successful; she emerged from one nursing-home stay with a new dependency on the sleeping pill paraldehyde, then available over-the-counter.

In 1939, she was diagnosed with breast cancer and refused surgery, seeking alternative treatments. The following year, with the Germans approaching Paris, she fled to England. She died aged 45 in 1941, of "causes unascertainable", according to the coroner's inquest—possibly the cancer or possibly a drug overdose.

== Relationship with Natalie Barney ==
Wilde's longest relationship, lasting from 1927 until her death, was with openly lesbian American writer Natalie Clifford Barney, who was host of one of the best-known Parisian literary salons of the 20th century.

== Writing ==
Dolly Wilde was regarded by many as a gifted storyteller and writer, but she never took advantage of these natural talents. She was supported mostly by the generosity of others and by a small inheritance from her stepfather; her only written works were translations—often uncredited and unpaid—and animated correspondence with her friends.
