= N61 road (Ireland) =

Road in Ireland

N61 road
- Bóthar N61

Route information
- Length: 74.193 km (46.101 mi)

Location
- Country: Ireland
- Primary destinations: County Roscommon; Athlone (N6 road); Knockcroghery; Lecarrow; Crosses the Hind River; Roscommon (N63, R366, N60); R368 road; Tulsk (R367 road); Crosses the Ogulla River; N5 road; R369 road; R370 road; R361 road; Boyle (R294 road); Crosses the Boyle River; Knockashee (N4 road)

Highway system
- Roads in Ireland; Motorways; Primary; Secondary; Regional

The N61 road is a national secondary road in County Roscommon in Ireland, linking Athlone, Roscommon, Tulsk, and Boyle. It also connects the N6, N63, N60, N5, and N4 national primary and national secondary roads, as well as seven regional roads. The road is 74.193 kilometres (46.101 mi) long (map).

The government legislation that defines the N61, the Roads Act 1993 (Classification of National Roads) Order 2012, provides the following official description:

N61: Athlone, County Westmeath — Boyle, County Roscommon

Between its junction with N6 at Bogganfin and its junction with N4 at Tawnytaskin via Kiltoom, Lecarrow, Knockcroghery, Ballymurray; Athlone Road and Circular Road in the town of Roscommon; Cloonbrackna, Carrownalassan, Tulsk Cross, Shankill, Ratallen, Greatmeadow; Elphin Street, Carrick Road, Sligo Road (and via Military Road, Main Street and Bridge Street) in the town of Boyle; and Knockashee all in the county of Roscommon.

== See also ==
- Roads in Ireland
- Motorways in Ireland
