= William Wilde =

Irish surgeon and writer

Sir William Wilde FRCSI
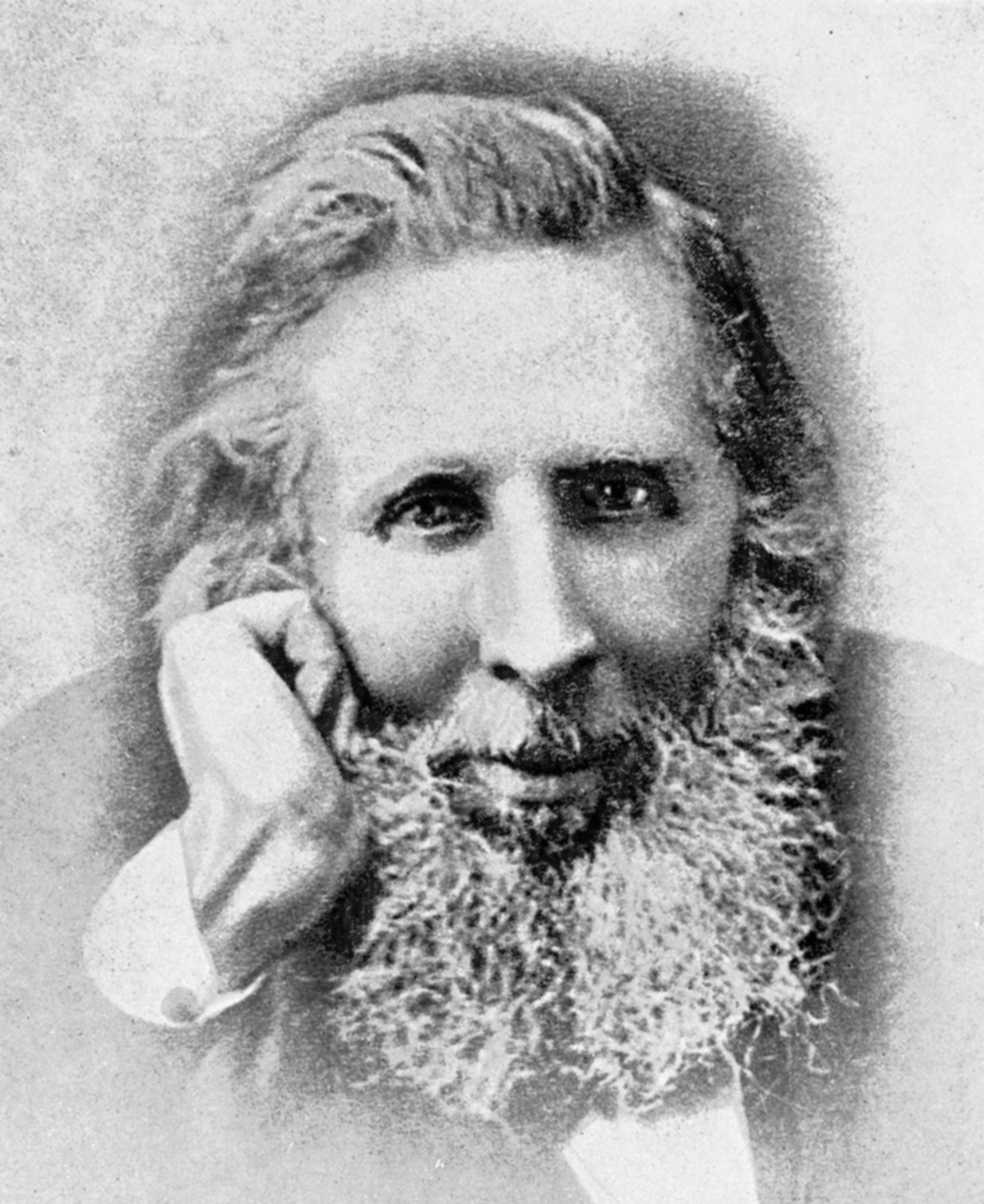
- Born: William Robert Wills Wilde; March 1815; Castlerea, County Roscommon, Ireland
- Died: 19 April 1876 (aged 61); Dublin, Ireland
- Occupations: Surgeon, otolaryngologist, ophthalmologist
- Spouse: Jane Elgee (m. 1851)
- Children: 6, including Willie and Oscar

Sir William Robert Wills Wilde FRCSI (March 1815 – 19 April 1876) was an Irish oto-ophthalmologic surgeon and the author of significant works on medicine, archaeology and folklore, particularly concerning his native Ireland. He was the father of Oscar Wilde.

== Early life and career ==
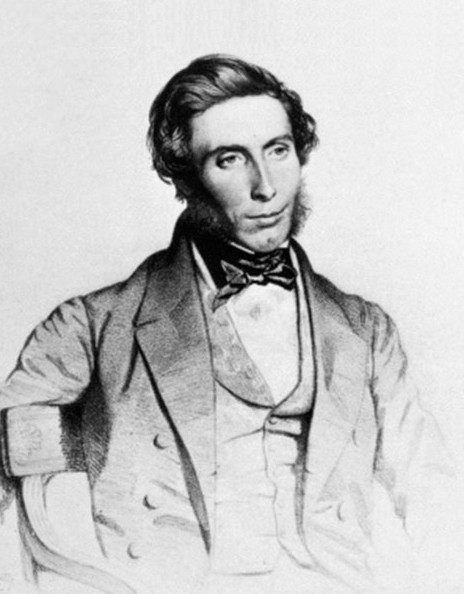
Sketch of William Wilde by J.H. Maguire, 1847

William Wilde was born at Kilkeevin, near Castlerea, in County Roscommon, the youngest of the three sons and two daughters of a prominent local medical practitioner, Thomas Wills Wilde, and his wife, Amelia Flynne (d. c.1844). His family were members of the Church of Ireland. He was descended from a Dutchman, Colonel de Wilde, who went to Ireland with King William of Orange's invasion army in 1690, and numerous Anglo-Irish ancestors. He received his initial education at the Elphin Diocesan School in Elphin, County Roscommon. In 1832, Wilde was bound as an apprentice to Abraham Colles, the pre-eminent Irish surgeon of the day, at Dr Steevens' Hospital in Dublin. He was also taught by the surgeons James Cusack and Sir Philip Crampton and the physician Sir Henry Marsh. Wilde also studied at the private and highly respected school of anatomy, medicine, and surgery in Park Street (later Lincoln Place), Dublin. In 1837, he earned his medical degree from the Royal College of Surgeons in Ireland. In the same year, Wilde embarked on an eight-month cruise to the Holy Land with a recovering patient, visiting various cities and islands throughout the Mediterranean. Porpoises were flung on board the ship, Crusader, and Wilde dissected them. Taking notes, he eventually composed a two-volume book on the nursing habits of the creatures. Among the places he visited on this tour was Egypt. In a tomb, he found the mummified remains of a dwarf and salvaged the torso to bring back to Ireland. He also collected embalmed ibises.

Once back in Ireland, Wilde published an article in the Dublin University Magazine suggesting that one of the "Cleopatra's Needles" be transported to England (eventually in 1878 one of the Needles was transported to London, and in 1880 the other one was brought to New York's Central Park). In 1873 he was awarded the Cunningham Gold Medal by the Royal Irish Academy. Wilde was a founder member of the Irish nationalist Home Government Association, established by his Trinity College Dublin colleague Isaac Butt as the precursor to the Irish Parliamentary Party.

== Recognition ==
He ran his own hospital, St Mark's Ophthalmic Hospital for Diseases of the Eye and Ear, in Dublin and was appointed to serve as Oculist-in-ordinary to Queen Victoria. At one point, Wilde performed surgery on the father of another famous Irish dramatist, George Bernard Shaw.

Wilde had a very successful medical practice and was assisted in it by his natural son, Henry Wilson, who had been trained in Dublin, Vienna, Heidelberg, Berlin, and Paris. Wilson's presence enabled Wilde to travel and he visited Scandinavia, where he received an honorary degree from Uppsala, and was welcomed in Stockholm by Anders Retzius, among others. King Karl XV of Sweden conferred on him the Nordstjärneorden (Order of the North Star). In 1853, he was appointed Surgeon Occulist in Ordinary to the Queen in Ireland, the first position of its kind, probably created for him.

He was awarded a knighthood in a ceremony at Dublin Castle on 28 January 1864 more for his involvement with the Irish census than for his medical contributions, although he had been appointed medical commissioner to the Irish census in 1841. In 1845, he became editor of the Dublin Journal of Medical Science, to which he contributed many articles.

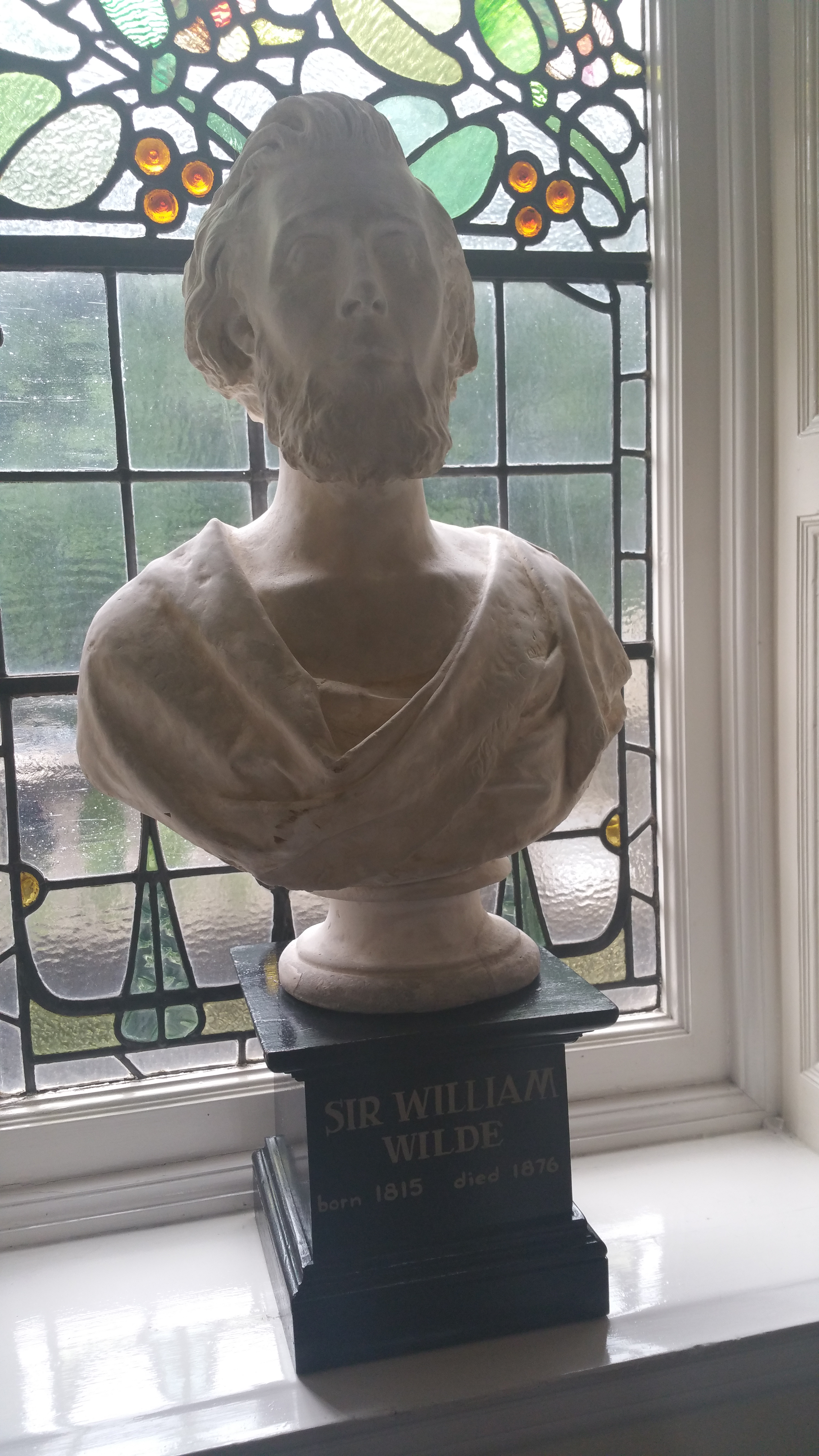
A marble bust of William Wilde on the main staircase of the Royal Victoria Eye and Ear Hospital, Dublin, Ireland

There is a plaque at 2 Merrion Square, Dublin dedicated to Wilde.

== Marriage and children ==
On 12 November 1851, Wilde married the poet Jane Francesca Agnes Elgee, who wrote and published under the name of Speranza. The couple had two sons: William (Willie) and Oscar, and a daughter, Isola Francesca, who died in childhood.

In addition to his children with his wife, Sir William Wilde was the father of three children born out of wedlock before his marriage: Henry Wilson, born in 1838, and Emily and Mary Wilde, born in 1847 and 1849, respectively, of different parentage to Henry. Sir William acknowledged paternity of his illegitimate children and provided for their education, but they were reared by his relatives rather than with his wife and legitimate children. Emily and Mary both died in 1871 following a Halloween party at which their dresses accidentally caught fire.

From 1855 to his death in 1876, William Wilde lived at No. 1 Merrion Square, now the headquarters of American College Dublin. The building is named Oscar Wilde House after William Wilde's son, who also lived at the address from 1855 until 1878.

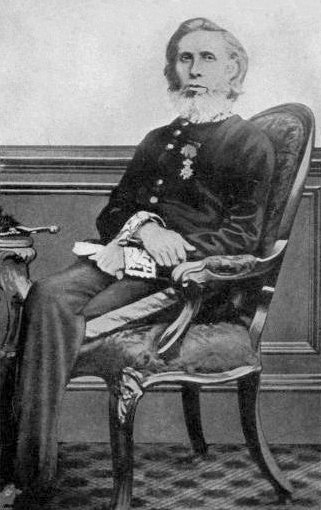
Sir William Wilde

== Later life ==
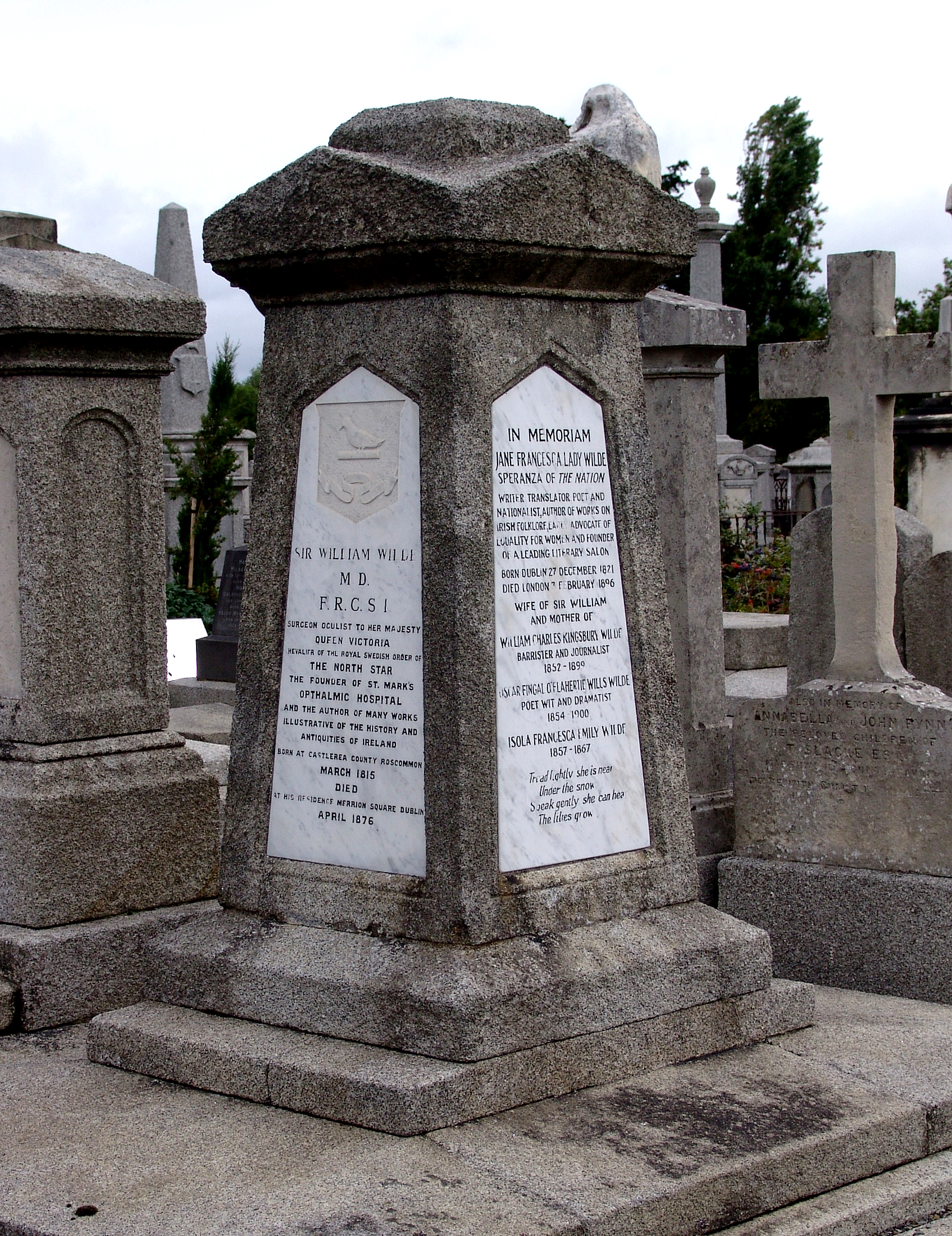
Memorial to Sir William Wilde and his wife located in Mount Jerome Cemetery, Dublin

Wilde's reputation suffered when Mary Travers, a long-term patient of his and the daughter of a colleague, claimed that he had raped her two years earlier. She wrote a pamphlet crudely parodying Wilde and Lady Wilde as Dr and Mrs Quilp, and portraying Dr Quilp as the rapist of a female patient anaesthetised under chloroform. She distributed the pamphlets outside the building where Wilde was about to give a public lecture. Lady Wilde complained to Mary's father, Robert Travers, which resulted in Mary bringing a libel case against her. Mary Travers won her case but was awarded a mere farthing in damages by the jury. Legal costs of £2,000 were awarded against Lady Wilde. The case was the talk of all Dublin, and Wilde's refusal to enter the witness box during the trial was widely held against him as ungentlemanly behaviour.

From this time onwards, Wilde began to withdraw from Dublin to the west of Ireland, where he had started in 1864 to build what became Moytura, his house overlooking Lough Corrib's north-east shore between the villages of Cong and Cross, County Mayo. He died aged 61 in 1876, and is buried in Mount Jerome Cemetery in Dublin.

== Publications ==
- Narrative of a Voyage to Madeira, Teneriffe, and Along the Shores of the Mediterranean, 1840.
- Austria: Its Literary, Scientific, and Medical Institutions. With notes upon the present state of science, and a guide to the hospitals and sanatory establishments of Vienna, 1843
- The beauties of the Boyne and its tributary the Blackwater, 1849.
- The closing years of Dean Swift's life, 1849.
- The Epidemics of Ireland, 1851.
- Practical observations on aural surgery and the nature and treatment of diseases of the ear, 1853.
- Lough Corrib, its Shores and Islands, first published 1867, republished 2002.
- 'The Early Races of Mankind in Ireland', The Irish Builder, 1874.
- Selected writings of Speranza and William Wilde, edited by Eibhear Walshe, 2020.

=== Books about ===
- Victorian Doctor: the Life of Sir William Wilde, T.G. Wilson (Methuen, London, 1942.)
