= Independence Monument =

Independence Monument may refer to:

- Independence Monument (Albania)
- Independence Monument (Bangladesh)
- Independence Monument (Brazil)
- Independence Monument (Cambodia)
- Independence Monument (Colorado)
- Independence Monument (Togo)
- Independence Monument (Turkmenistan)
- Independence Monument (Ukraine)
