= Smith Hill (house) =

Smith Hill or Smithhill is an early nineteenth-century house situated about 1.5 km east of Elphin, County Roscommon, in Ardnagowan. It is believed that the poet, playwright and novelist Oliver Goldsmith may have been born in an earlier house on the site while his mother, Ann Goldsmith (née Jones), was visiting her parents, the Rev. Oliver Jones and wife.

It was later the seat of the Rev. John Lloyd, a kinsman of Oliver Goldsmith. In 1847, Lloyd was famously murdered by his tenant Owen Beirne.

Ballyoughter where Oliver Goldsmith's father was born and where Oliver Goldsmith himself spent part of his childhood is also in the parish of Elphin.
