= Willie Wilde =

Irish journalist and poet (1852–1899)

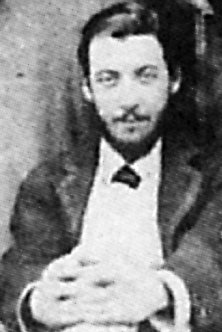
- Born: William Charles Kingsbury Wilde; 26 September 1852; Dublin, Ireland
- Died: 13 March 1899 (aged 46); Chelsea, London, England
- Occupations: Journalist, poet
- Spouses: Miriam Leslie (m. 1891; div. 1893) Sophie Lily Lees (m. 1894)
- Children: Dorothy Wilde
- Parent(s): William Wilde (father); Jane Wilde (mother)
- Relatives: Oscar Wilde (brother)
- Writing career
- Language: English
- Genres: Journalism, poetry

William Charles Kingsbury Wilde (26 September 1852 – 13 March 1899) was an Irish journalist and poet of the Victorian era. He was the older brother of Oscar Wilde.

== Background ==
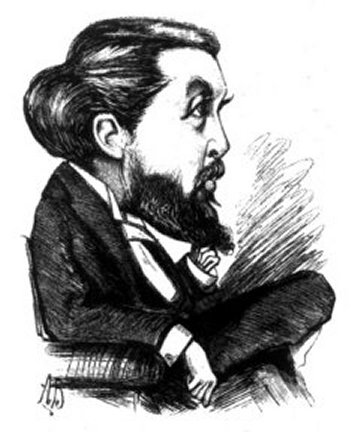
Willie Wilde by Alfred Bryan

Willie was the oldest son born into an Anglo-Irish family, at 21 Westland Row, Dublin, to Sir William Wilde and his wife Jane Francesca Wilde (née Elgee; her pseudonym being 'Speranza'). Their second son, Oscar, was born in the same house in 1854. Jane Wilde was a successful writer, being a poet for the revolutionary Young Irelanders in 1848 and a lifelong Irish nationalist. Sir William was Ireland's leading Oto-Ophthalmologic (ear and eye) surgeon and was knighted in 1864 for his services to medicine. William also wrote books on archaeology and folklore. He was a renowned philanthropist, and his dispensary for the care of the city's poor, in Lincoln Place at the rear of Trinity College, Dublin, was the forerunner of the Dublin Eye and Ear Hospital, now located at Adelaide Road.

In June 1855, the family moved to 1 Merrion Square in a fashionable residential area, where Wilde's sister, Isola, was born in 1856. Here, Lady Wilde held a regular Saturday afternoon salon with guests including Sheridan le Fanu, Samuel Lever, George Petrie, Isaac Butt and Samuel Ferguson.

In February 1864, Willie and Oscar were sent to board at the Portora Royal School at Enniskillen in Ulster, where Willie became known for his good-humour and friendliness, later being described by a classmate as "clever, erratic and full of vitality". Oscar became known to his school fellows by the nickname 'Grey Crow', which he disliked, while Willie was 'Blue Blood'. Willie was "an accomplished pianist and an artist of little talent' Oscar Wilde later recalled that the headmaster, Dr Steele, had told him that “If I went on studying as I had been during the last year I might yet do as well as my brother Willie, and be an honour to the school and everyone connected with it.”

Willie was already a student at Trinity College, Dublin when Oscar joined him in 1871, the two sharing rooms during their second and third years there. In 1876 'Willie' published several of his poems in the College magazine Kottabos, which he also edited.

== Life ==
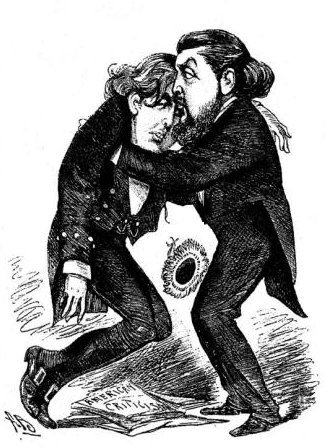
"Brother Willie- "Never mind, Oscar; other great men have had their dramatic failures!" 1883 cartoon by Alfred Bryan after the failure of Oscar Wilde's play Vera; or, The Nihilists in America

After graduating from Trinity College Willie Wilde studied law and was called to the Irish Bar, but he never actually practised law. His father died in 1876, and in early 1879 Willie and Lady Wilde moved to London, where he became a journalist, serving as a drama critic for Punch and Vanity Fair, as a leader writer for The Daily Telegraph, and as editor of Christmas numbers of several magazines.

Willie was a regular guest at the Fielding Club, which during its short life opened its doors at eight o'clock in the evening and remained open all night. The club was famous for its grills, its brandy and its Pol Roger '74, but its tripe and onions on Saturdays were an especial draw. One member listed Willie among those who were "constant guests" on Saturdays, along with Henry Irving, Herbert Beerbohm Tree, J. Comyns Carr, Edward Dicey, Carlo Pellegrini, Frederic Clay and Oscar Wilde.

Ralph Nevill, the son of Lady Dorothy Nevill, said of Willie Wilde:

"Willie Wilde was a clever journalist who, had he been less careless in his habits, might have achieved considerable success. As it was, a number of the articles which he wrote for the Daily Telegraph were little short of brilliant, while as a talker, few could equal him. He was, however, his own enemy, and could not resist the attractions of the moment or settle down long to regular work – in truth, though not very old in years, he belonged to the now almost extinct school of journalists which, taking ‘sufficient is the day for the evil there of’ as their motto, never gave a thought to the future (or anything else) if they happened to have a few pounds in their pockets."

By the time of Oscar's marriage, in 1884, Willie was seriously in debt and drinking heavily. On 4 October 1891, aged 39, Willie married a wealthy widow, Mrs Frank Leslie (1836–1914), the owner of the Frank Leslie Publishing Company in New York. She was initially attracted by Willie's humour and wit. He proceeded to spend much of his time in New York drinking at the fashionable Lotos Club, gossiping about London Society and reciting parodies of his brother's poems, which perhaps suggests that he was jealous of Oscar's success. His marriage was short-lived, Mrs Leslie starting divorce proceedings within a year on the grounds of Willie's drunkenness and adultery. They were finally divorced on 10 June 1893.

On his return to London, early in 1892, Willie found that Oscar was the toast of the town for his successful play Lady Windermere's Fan. It is believed that Willie wrote the ambivalent review of the play that was published unsigned in Vanity Fair on 27 February 1892 (he had previously been a drama critic for the magazine). The reviewer, whoever he really was, wrote that "The play was 'brilliantly unoriginal,' but the dialogue was 'uniformly bright, graceful and flowing.' He concluded that it was 'an undeniably clever piece of work; and even though it has its weaknesses, it reflects credit on its author. ... It is emphatically a play to see.'" Oscar, believing that he recognised his brother's hand behind the anonymous review, was by then writing A Woman of No Importance, in which one character says: "After a good dinner, one can forgive anybody, even one's own relations."

By now Willie Wilde was in serious financial difficulties and Oscar began giving him money, but bad feeling between the brothers heightened when Oscar discovered that Willie was pestering their mother for money even though she was far from well-off. Oscar once said of Willie, "He sponges on everyone but himself." Max Beerbohm saw the brothers as mirror images and portrayed them as such in his caricatures of them. In a letter to the painter William Rothenstein Beerbohm wrote, "... did I tell you that I saw a good deal of [Oscar's] brother Willie at Broadstairs? Quel monstre! Dark, oily, suspect yet awfully like Oscar: he has Oscar's coy, carnal smile & fatuous giggle, & not a little of Oscar's esprit. But he is awful – a veritable tragedy of family-likeness".

Beerbohm later wrote:

"My sister Constance came home one day and summoned my mother and me; she was quivering to tell us what had happened. She knew in advance it was the sort of thing my mother would adore. Well, Constance had been walking along the street and met Willie Wilde – Oscar's brother. In one hand, he was carrying a huge leg of mutton by the narrow part; with his free hand he swept off his hat and bent over double in a grand, ceremonial bow. There was something so grotesquely funny in the way he did it, conveying both the mutton and the bow. We decided it was a first class thing."

In January 1894 Willie married Sophie Lily Lees (1859–1922), with whom he had been living. She has been described as "an emotional woman with a tendency to early panic ... she believed (incorrectly) that she was pregnant" She tried to induce an abortion by taking a powder. The marriage caused further distress to Lady Wilde when the couple moved in with her. She wrote to Oscar on 4 February 1894, telling him of the marriage: "Miss Lees has but £50 a year and this just dresses her. She can give nothing to the house and Willie is always in a state of utter poverty. So all is left upon me." Willie and Lily had their only child, Dorothy 'Dolly' Ierne Wilde, in July 1895.

Lady Wilde wrote Oscar a lengthy letter seeking reconciliation between him and Willie, who, she said, was "sickly and extravagant". She added that she was "miserable at the present position of [her] two sons" and "at the general belief that you hate your brother". She then asked Oscar to hold out his hand to Willie, a request she repeated several times in the letter: "Come then & offer him yr. hand in good faith – & begin a new course of action."

== Later years ==
Following Oscar's first trial and arrest in April 1895, Willie claimed that he gave his brother shelter when he was unable to find rooms in London. Willie said that Oscar "fell down on my threshold like a wounded stag". Standing by his brother, Willie wrote to Bram Stoker, "Bram, my friend, poor Oscar was not as bad as people thought him. He was led astray by his Vanity – & conceit, & he was so 'got at' that he was weak enough to be guilty – of indiscretions and follies – that is all.... I believe this thing will help to purify him body & soul." Willie did not meet Oscar after he was released from prison in 1897.

On 13 March 1899 Willie died, aged 46, at 9 Cheltenham Terrace in Chelsea from complications related to his alcoholism. After Robert Ross wrote to Oscar in France informing him of Willie's death, Oscar replied: "I suppose it had been expected for some time. ... Between him and me there had been, as you know, wide chasms for many years. Requiescat in Pace."

Willie's widow remarried in 1900. Her second husband, who became Dolly's stepfather, was the Dutch-born translator Alexander Teixeira de Mattos.
