= R369 road (Ireland) =

Road in Ireland

Coordinates: 53.834502°N 8.235428°W

R369 road
- Bóthar R369
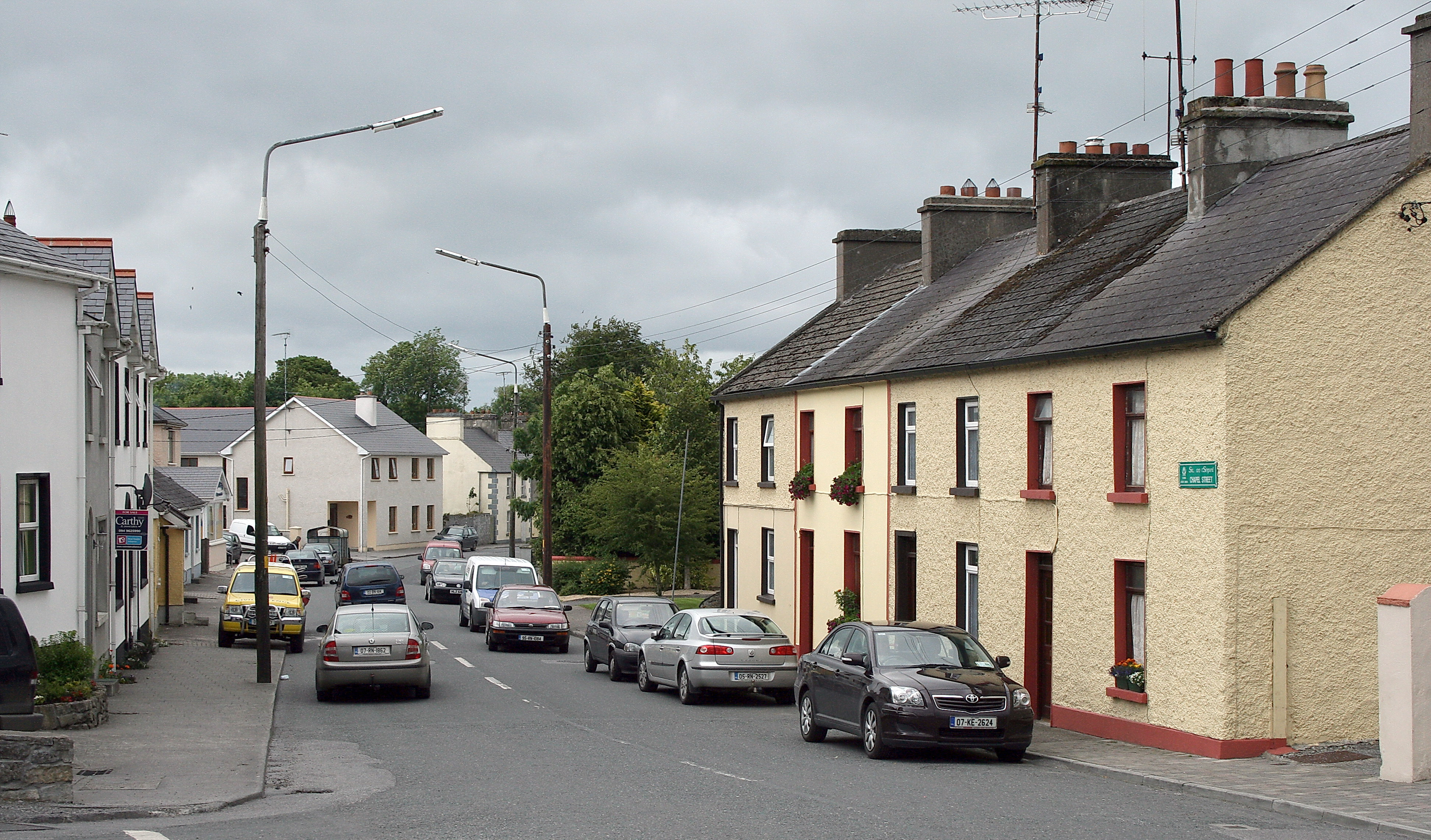
- Chapel Street, Elphin, part of the R369

Route information
- Length: 12.1 km (7.5 mi)

Major junctions
- From: N5 Gortnagoyne
- N61 Shankill
- To: R368 Elphin

Location
- Country: Ireland

Highway system
- Roads in Ireland; Motorways; Primary; Secondary; Regional

The R369 road is a regional road in Ireland, located in County Roscommon.
