= War of Independence Commemorative Military Memorial =

Memorial in Shankill Cross, County Roscommon

- Irish War of Independence and Irish Civil War veterans
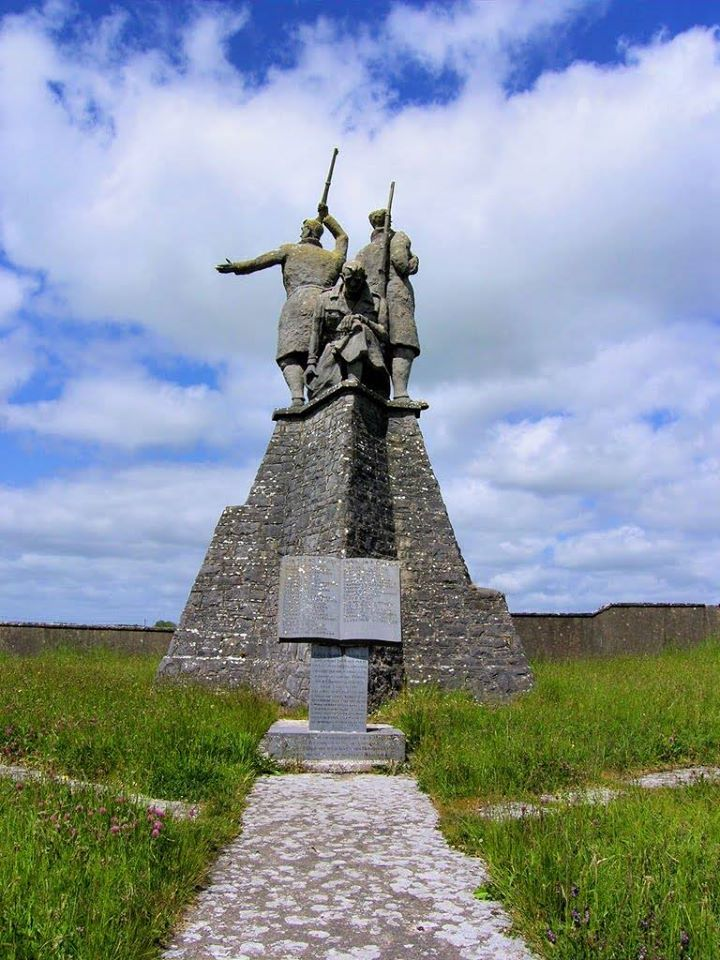
- War of Independence Commemorative Military Memorial
- For Irish Republican Army soldiers
- Established: 1963
- Location: 53°50′50.87″N 8°12′59.12″W; Shankill Cross, County Roscommon, Ireland near Elphin
- Chun glóire Dé agus Onóra na hÉireann‘ (For the glory of God and the honour of Ireland)

The War of Independence Commemorative Military Memorial also known simply as the Old IRA Memorial is a memorial in the townland of Shankill Cross near Elphin, County Roscommon, Ireland. The statue stands at 35 ft (11 m).

== History ==
The memorial was erected in 1963 by veterans of the Irish War of Independence and Irish Civil War in memory of the Irish Republican Army (IRA) that fought for the country's independence.

The unveiling ceremony was led by former IRA Commandant general Tom Maguire. Maguire served as the General officer commanding of the Second Western Division IRA during the 1920s.

A more recent addition includes a stone tablet featuring the names of 41 local Roscommon volunteers that fought with the Irish Republican Army, along with the message Chun glóire Dé agus Onóra na hÉireann (for the glory of God and the honour of Ireland) A memorial to Patrick Pearse stands to the right.

The entrance to the memorial is also a popular tourist spot, as it features a cast iron gate, featuring the Irish language phrase Saoirse meaning 'freedom'.
