= R370 road (Ireland) =

Road in Ireland

Coordinates: 53.914417°N 8.228479°W

R370 road
- Bóthar R370
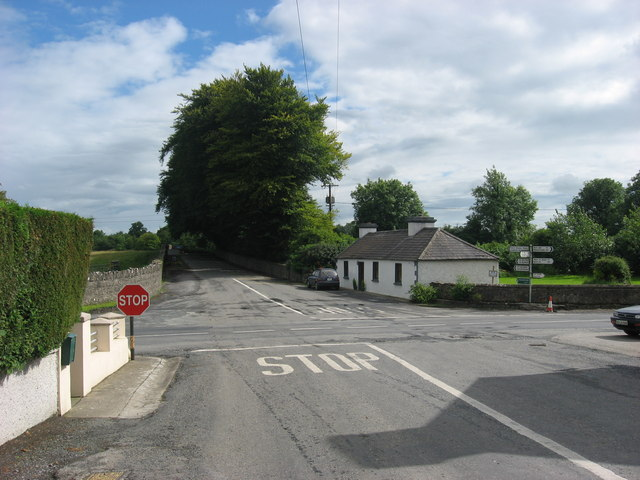
- Crossroads on R370 at Croghan

Route information
- Length: 20.5 km (12.7 mi)

Major junctions
- From: R361 Sheevannan
- Crosses Breedoge River and Bella River; N61 Rathallen
- To: R368 Carrick-on-Shannon

Location
- Country: Ireland

Highway system
- Roads in Ireland; Motorways; Primary; Secondary; Regional

The R370 road is a regional road in Ireland, located in County Roscommon.
