= Sacred Heart Church, Roscommon =

Church of the Sacred Heart
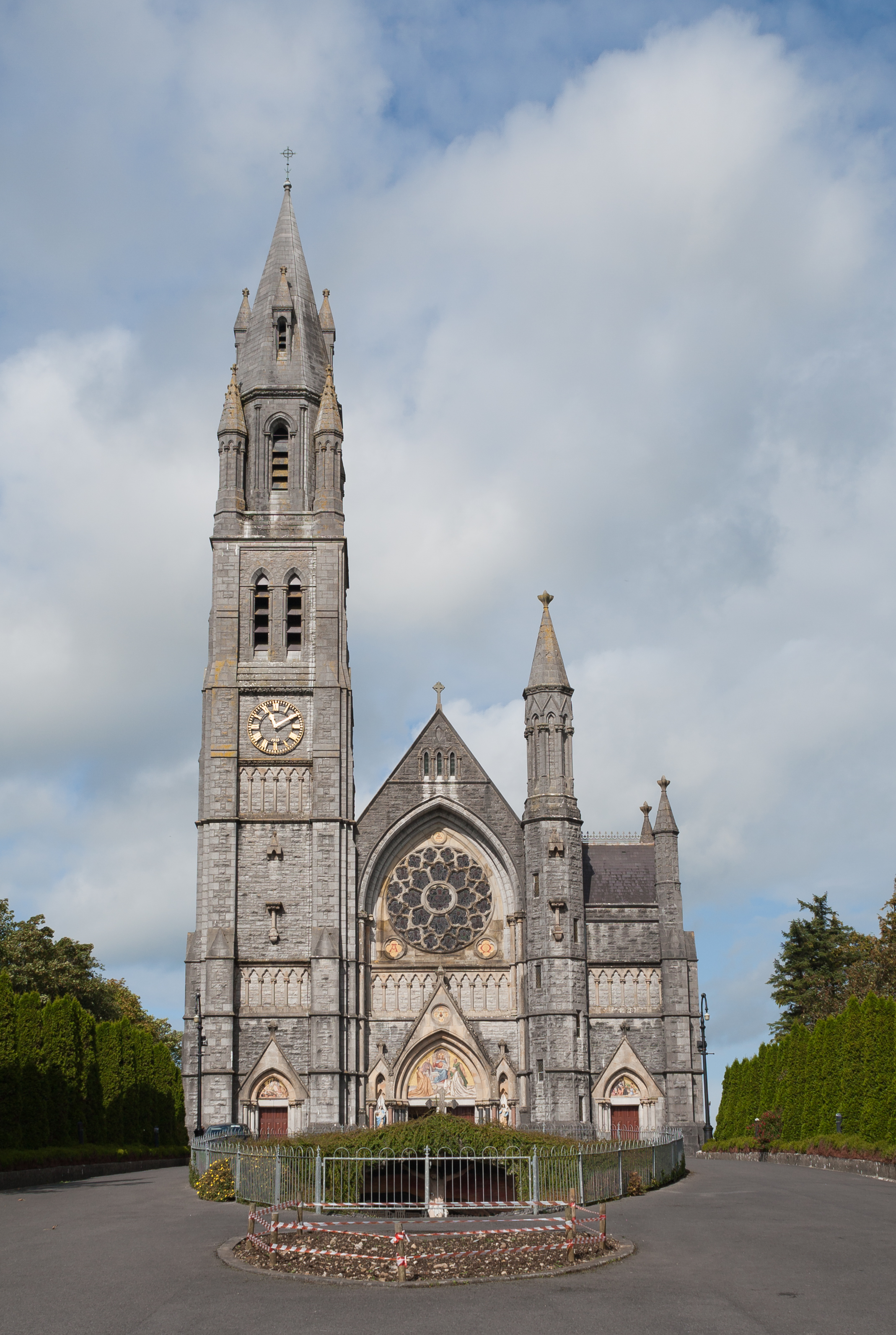
- Church of the Sacred Heart
- 53°37′43″N 8°11′43″W
- Location: Abbey St, Roscommon
- Country: Ireland
- Denomination: Roman Catholic

Architecture
- Architect: Walter Doolin
- Architectural type: Gothic Revival
- Completed: 1903

Specifications
- Materials: Sandstone

The Church of the Sacred Heart of Jesus, Roscommon, is the parochial church for the parish of Roscommon in the Roman Catholic Diocese of Elphin.

== Appraisal ==
The main church was completed in 1903 and the steeple was added in 1916. The church has a flamboyant architectural design. It has rock-faced walls with sandstone dressings and features carved detailing, stained-glass and mosaics by Salviati.

== Gallery ==
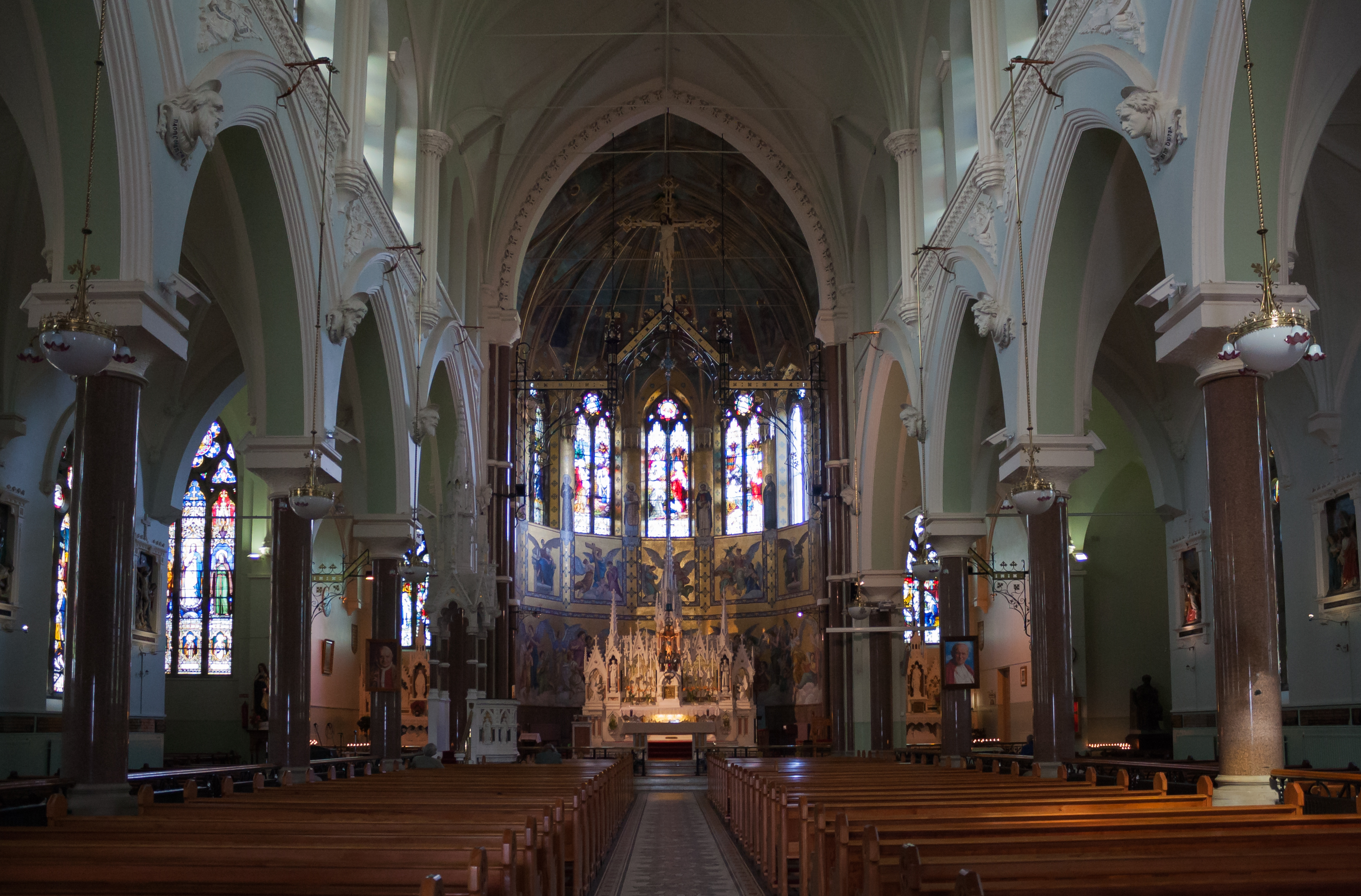
Interior

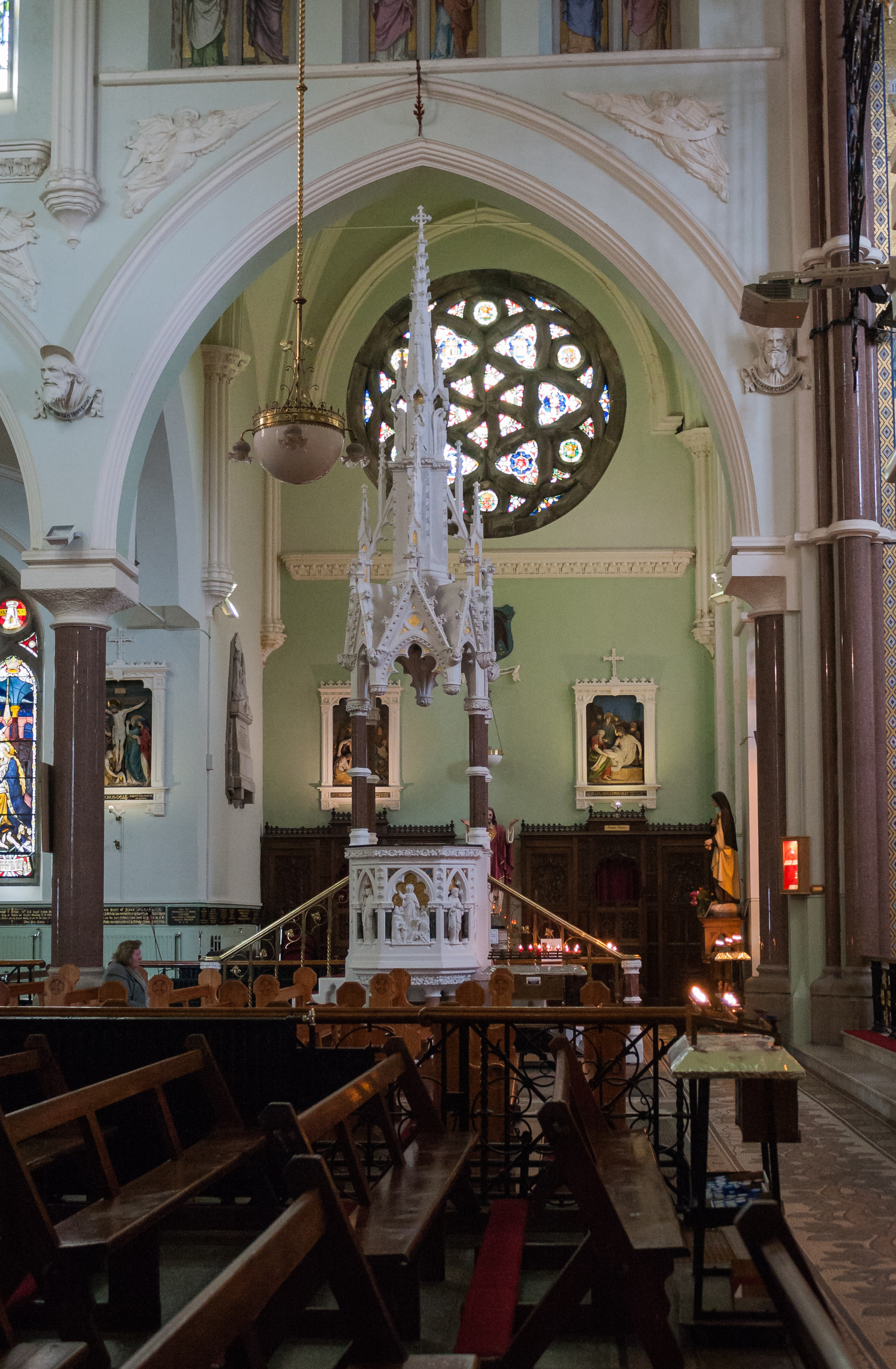
South transept

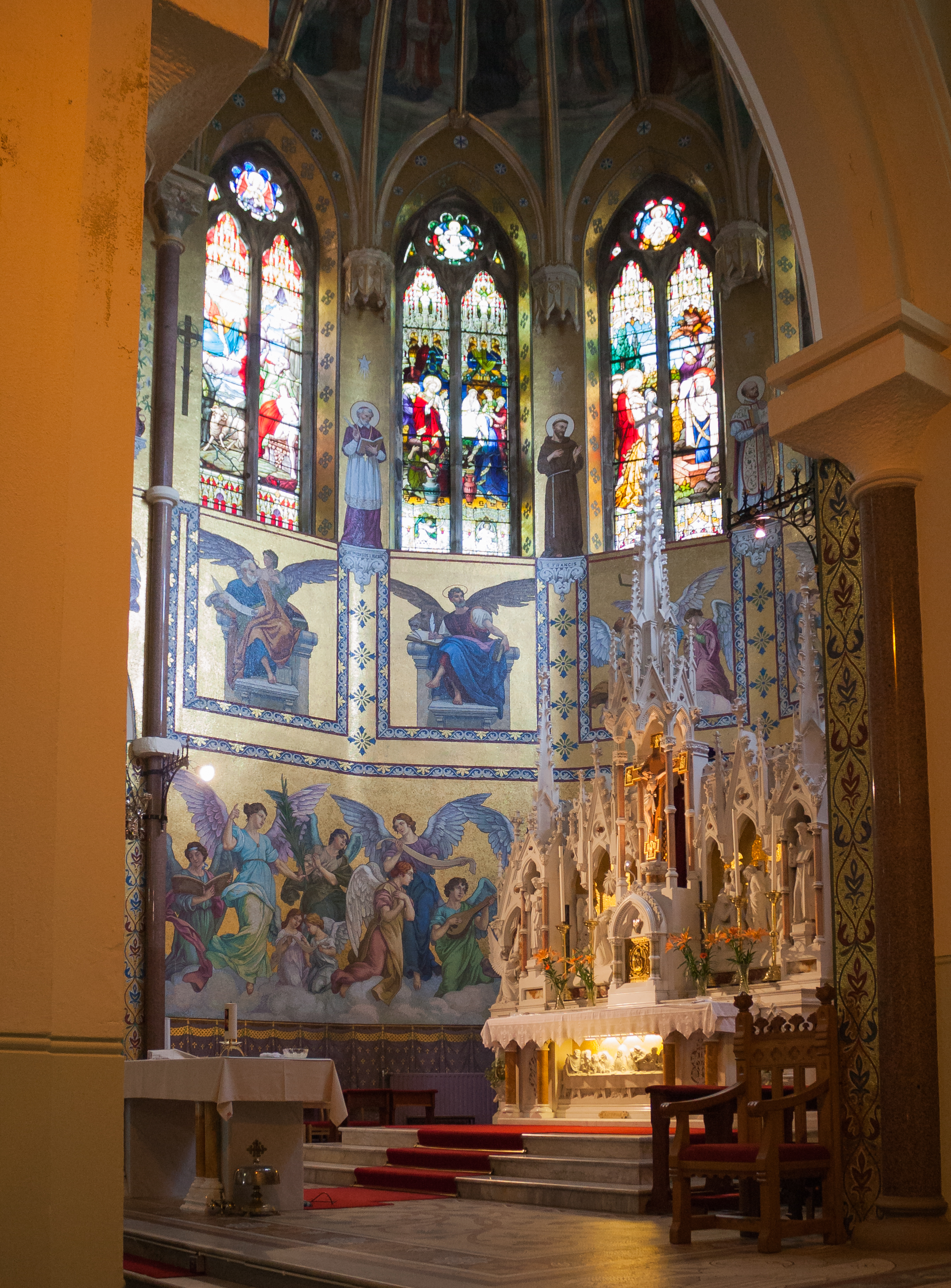
Altar

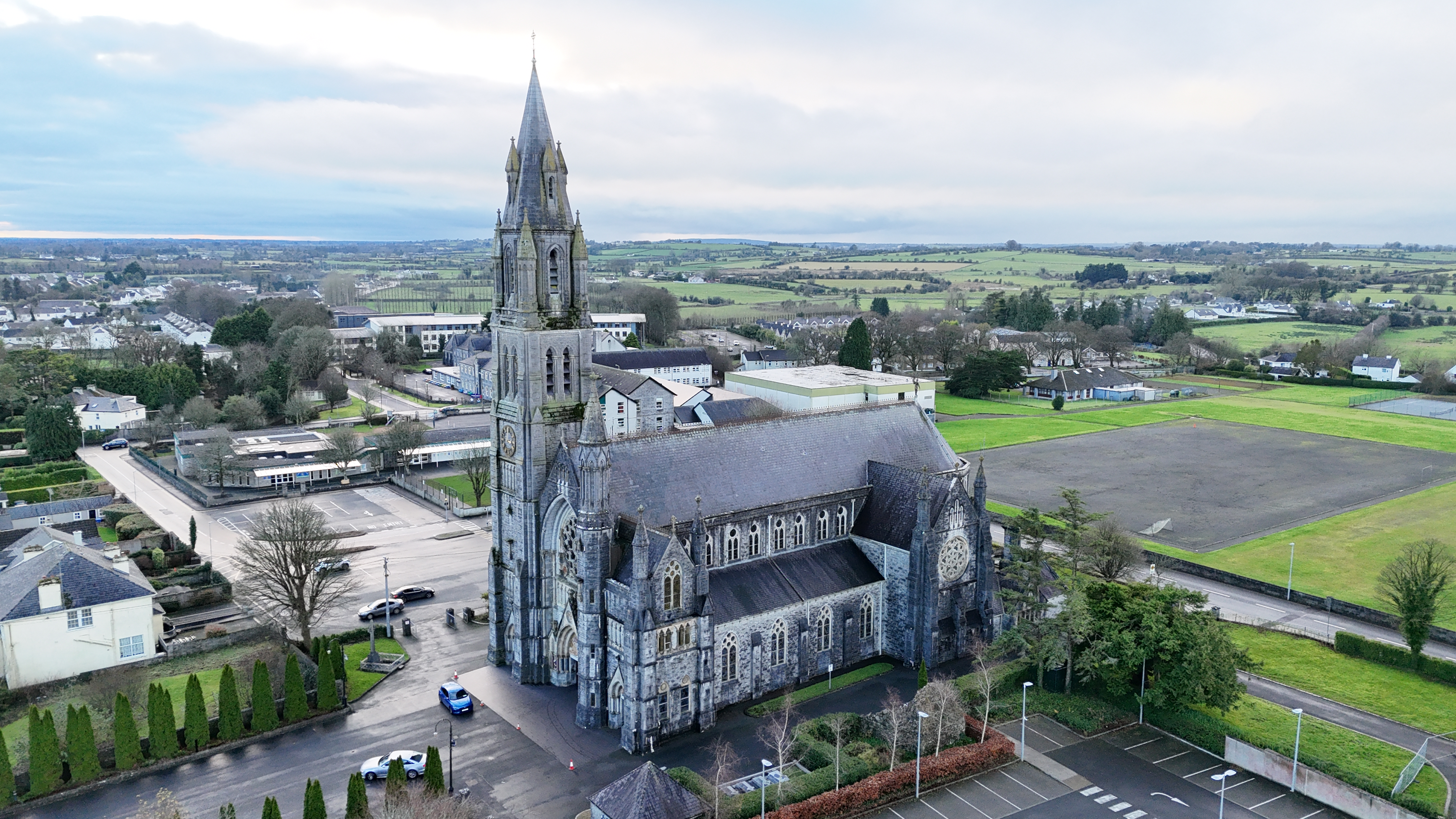
Aerial view

== Bibliography ==
- F. Francis Beirne The Diocese of Elphin, an illustrated history Booklink, 2007

== See also ==
- Sligo Cathedral (disambiguation)
- Roscommon
- Diocese of Elphin
