= Roscommon =

Town in Connacht, Ireland

Roscommon Ros Comáin (Irish)
- Town
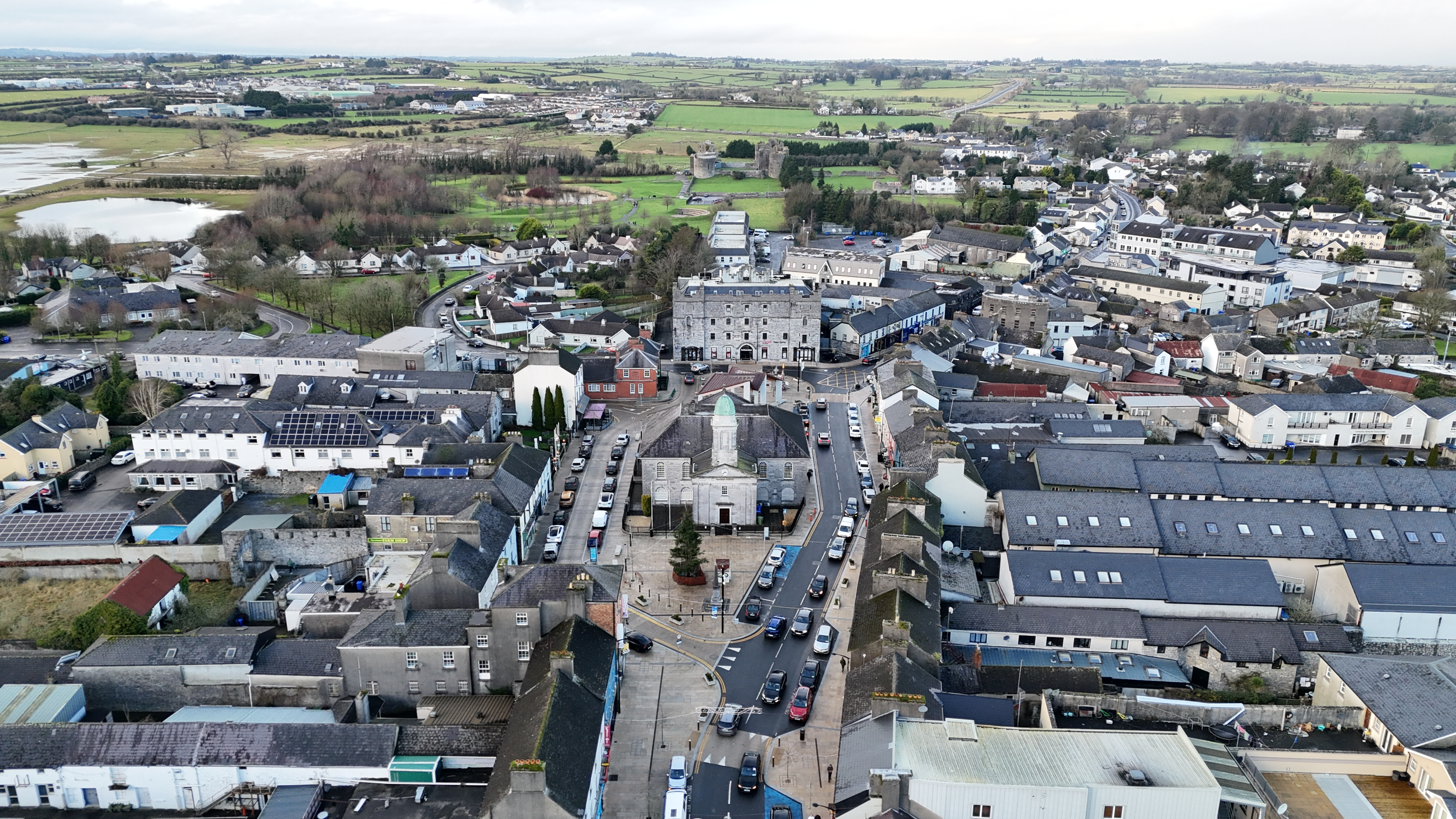
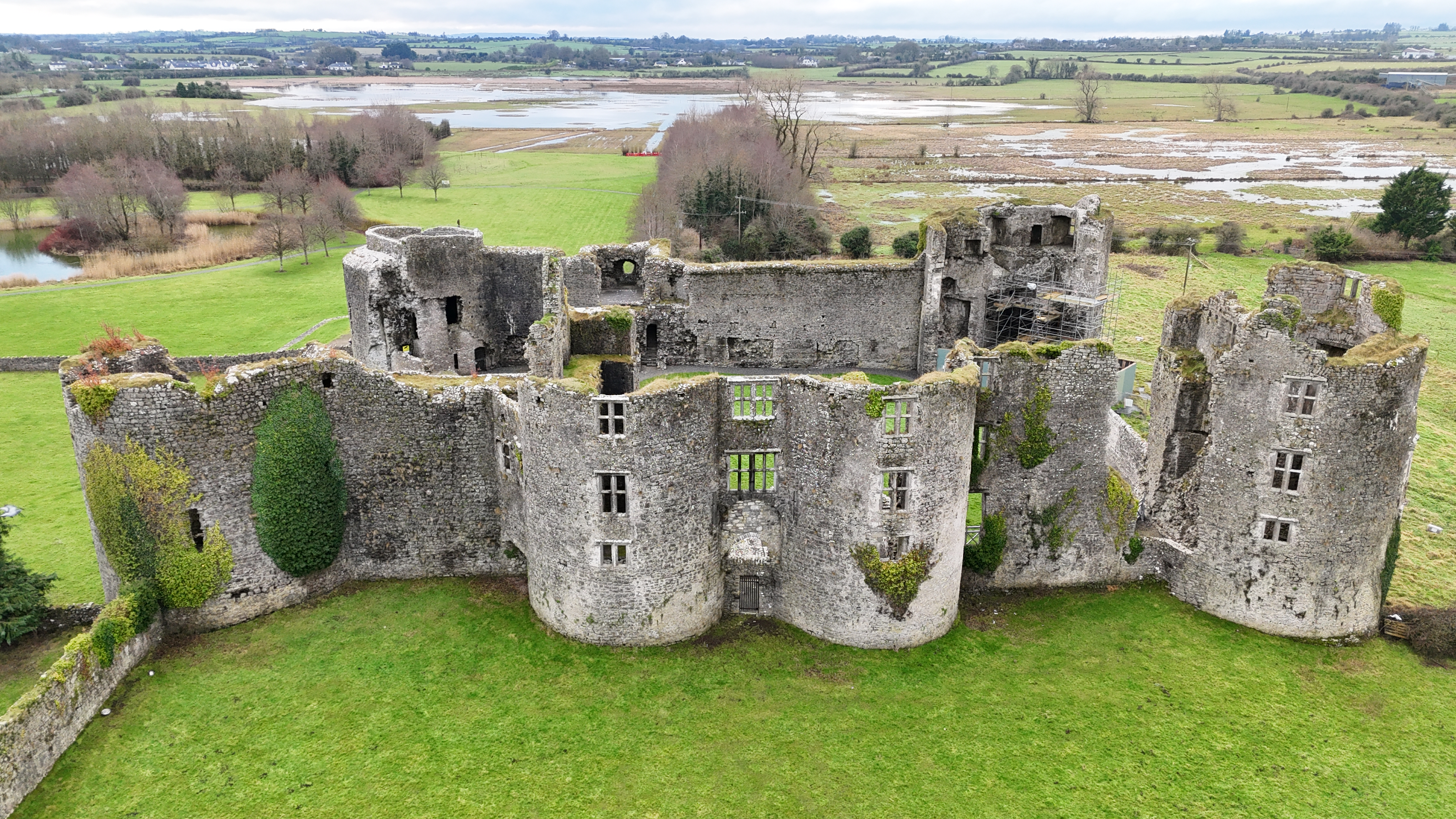
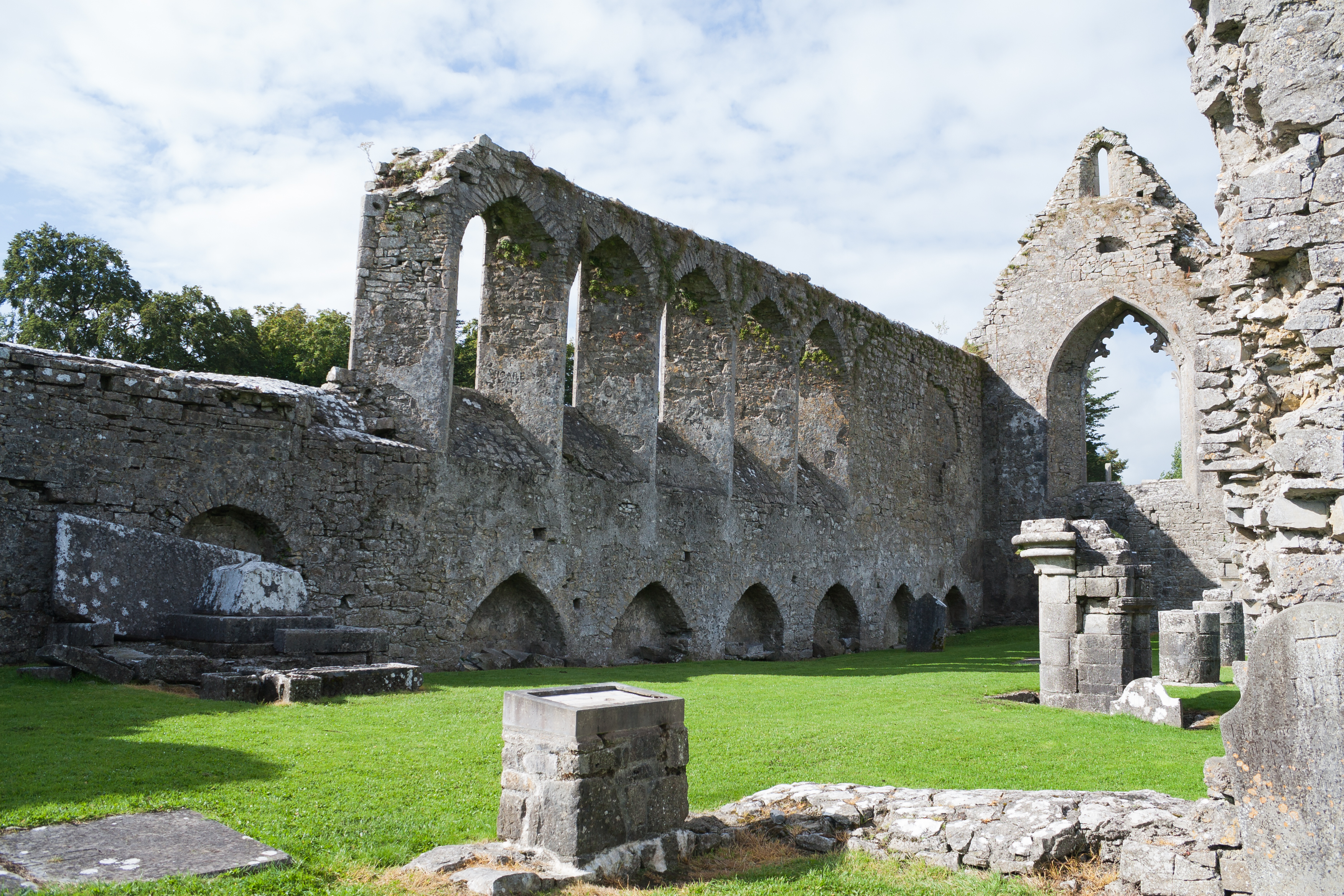
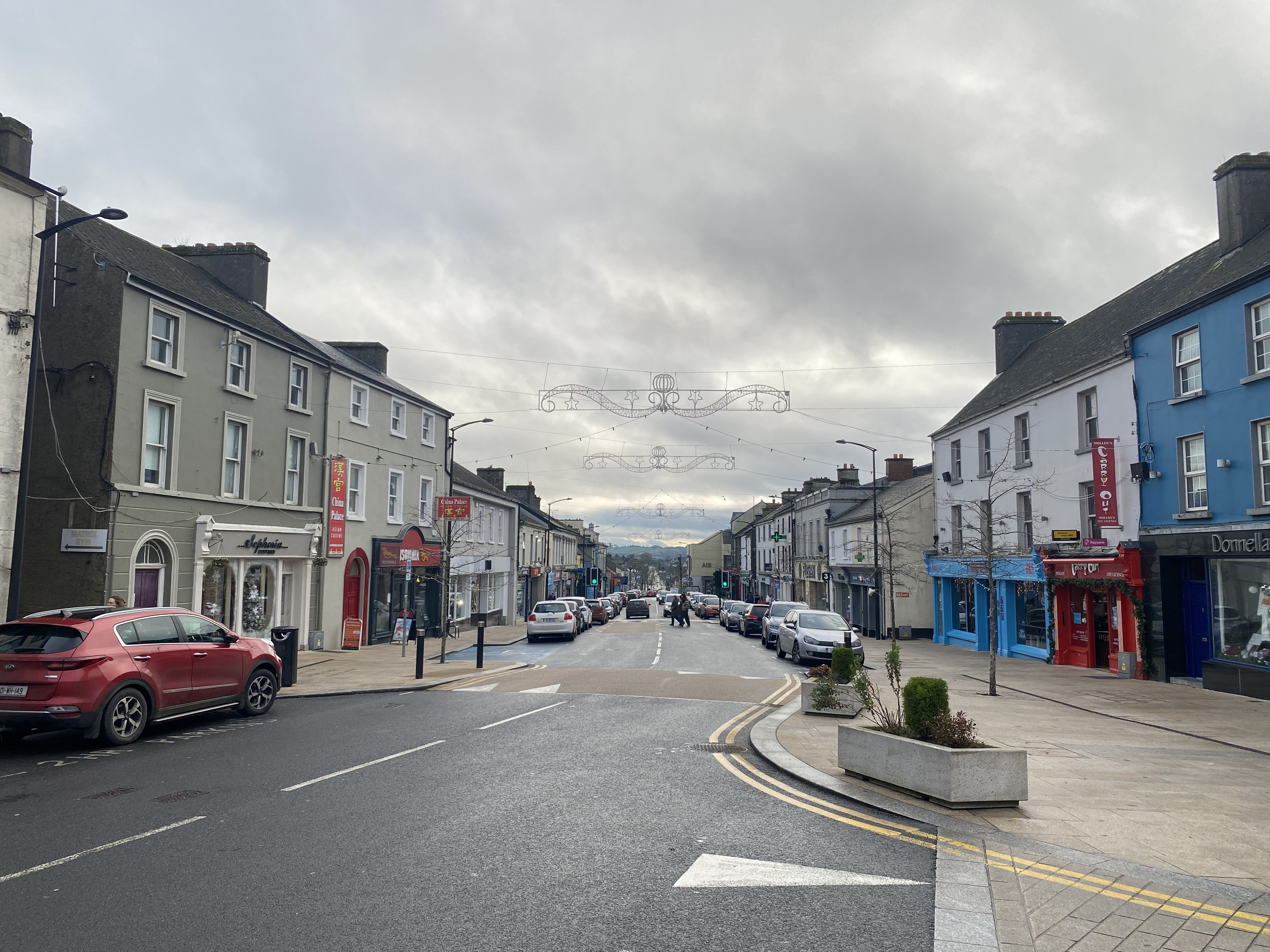
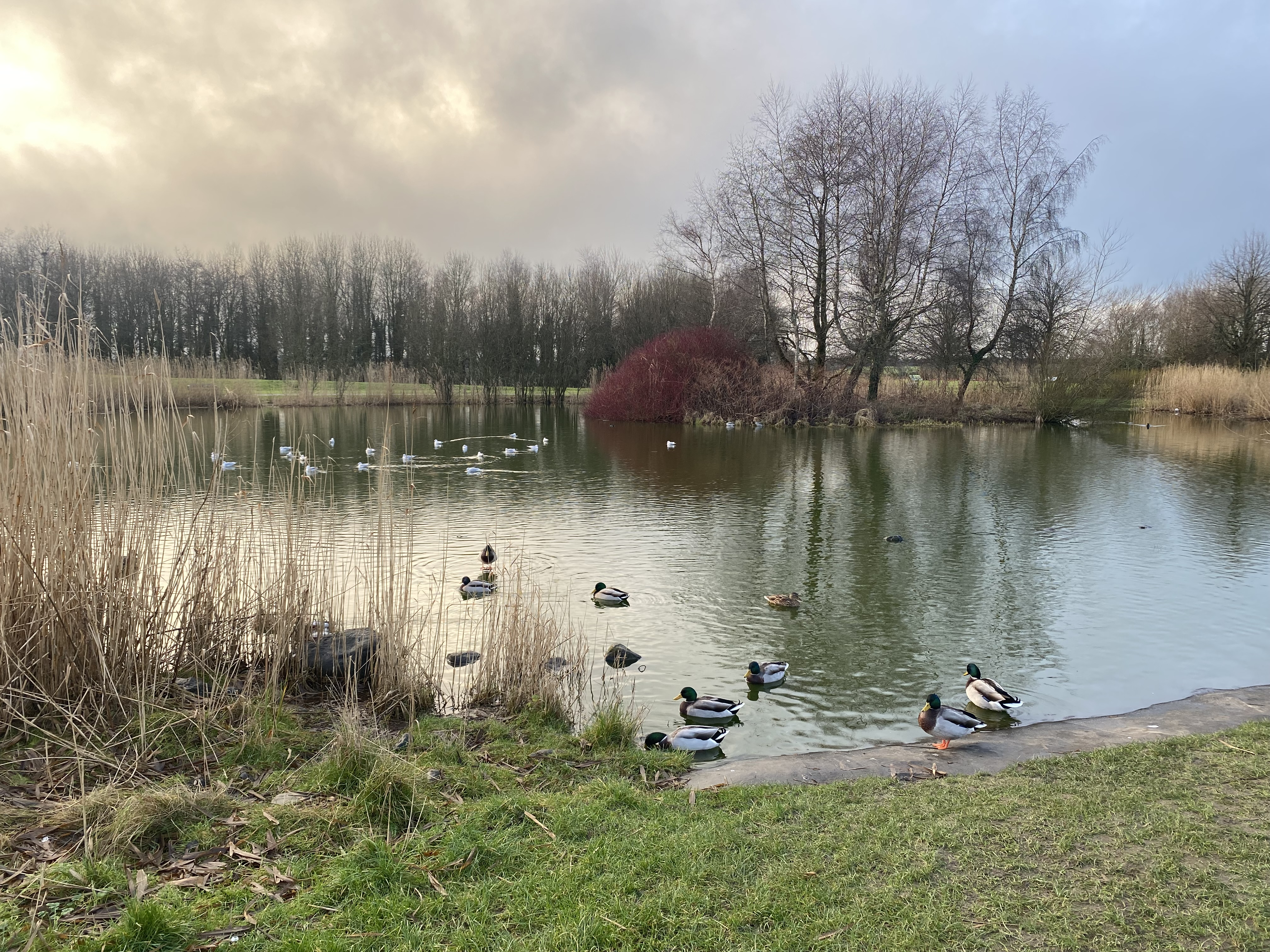
- Town skyline Roscommon Castle Roscommon Abbey Main Street Loughnaneane Park

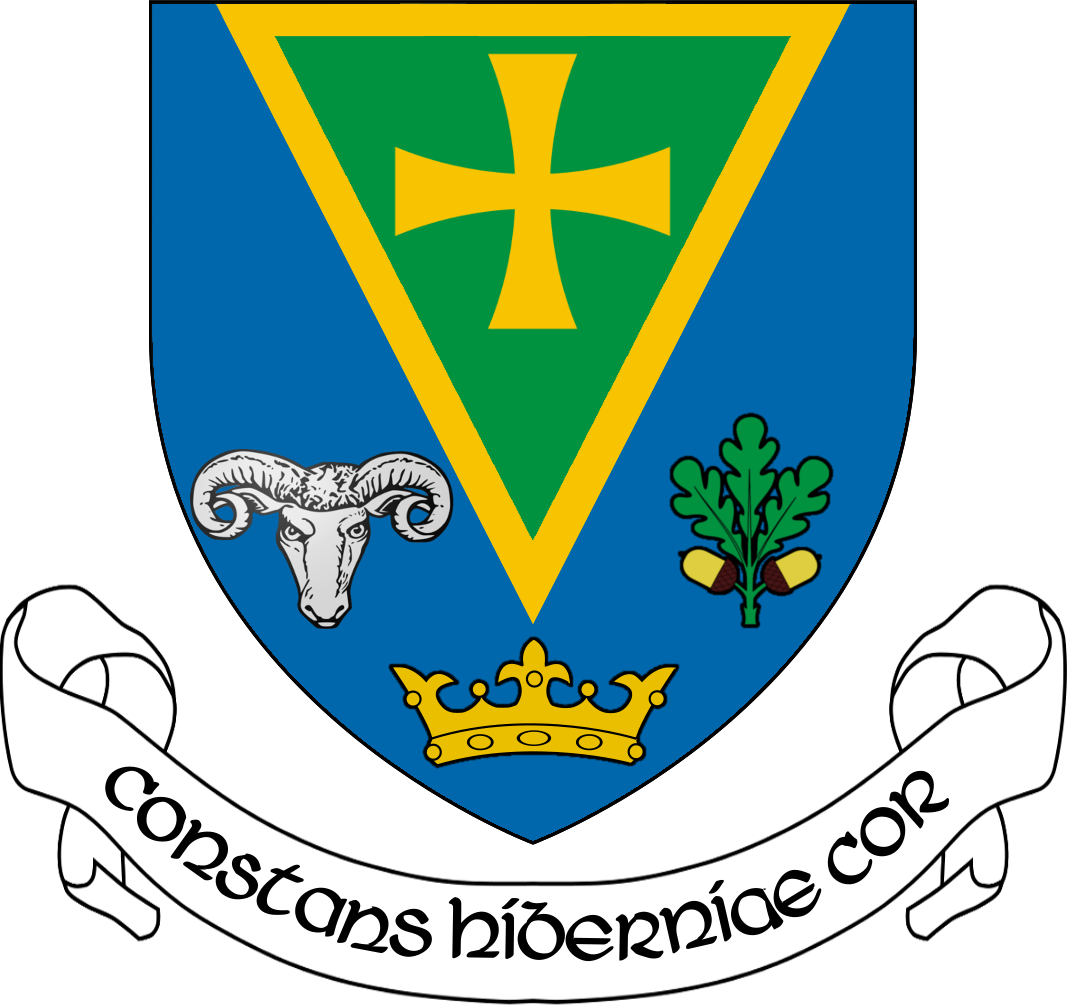
- Coat of arms
- Motto: Latin: Constans Hiberniae Cor "Steadfast Irish heart"
- Location in Ireland
- Coordinates: 53.6333°N 8.1833°W
- Country: Ireland
- Province: Connacht
- County: Roscommon

Area
  - Total: 8 km^{2} (3.1 sq mi)
- Elevation: 80 m (260 ft)

Population (2022)
  - Total: 6,555
  - Density: 734.5/km^{2} (1,902/sq mi)
- Irish Grid Reference: M879648

Roscommon (/rɒsˈkɒmən/; Irish: Ros Comáin, meaning 'Saint Coman's wood'; pronounced [ɾˠɔsˠ ˈkɔmˠaːnʲ]) is the county town and the largest town in County Roscommon in Ireland. It is roughly in the centre of Ireland, near the meeting of the N60, N61 and N63 roads. The town is in a civil parish of the same name.

The name Roscommon is derived from Commán mac Faelchon who built a monastery there in the 5th century. The woods near the monastery became known as Ros Comáin (St. Coman's Wood). This was later anglicised to Roscommon. Its population at the 2022 census was 6,555.

== History ==
Roscommon was the homeland of the Connachta dynasty, and included such kingdoms as Uí Maine, Delbhna Nuadat, Síol Muirdeach, and Moylurg. In addition, it contained areas known as Trícha cét's, Túath and is the homeland of surnames such as Ó Conchobhair (O'Conor, O'Connor), Mac Diarmada (McDermott), Ó Ceallaigh (Kelly), Ó Birn (Beirne, Byrne, Burns), Ó Duibh (Duff, Duffy, and Dufficy), Mac Donnchadha (McDonough) and Brennan (Mac Branáin and Ó Branáin).

From 1118 to 1156 Roscommon was the seat of the Diocese of Elphin.

The town is the location of a notable archaeological find in 1945 when a gold lunula and two gold discs were discovered. Both items are dated to the period 2300 and 1800 BC.

== Architecture ==
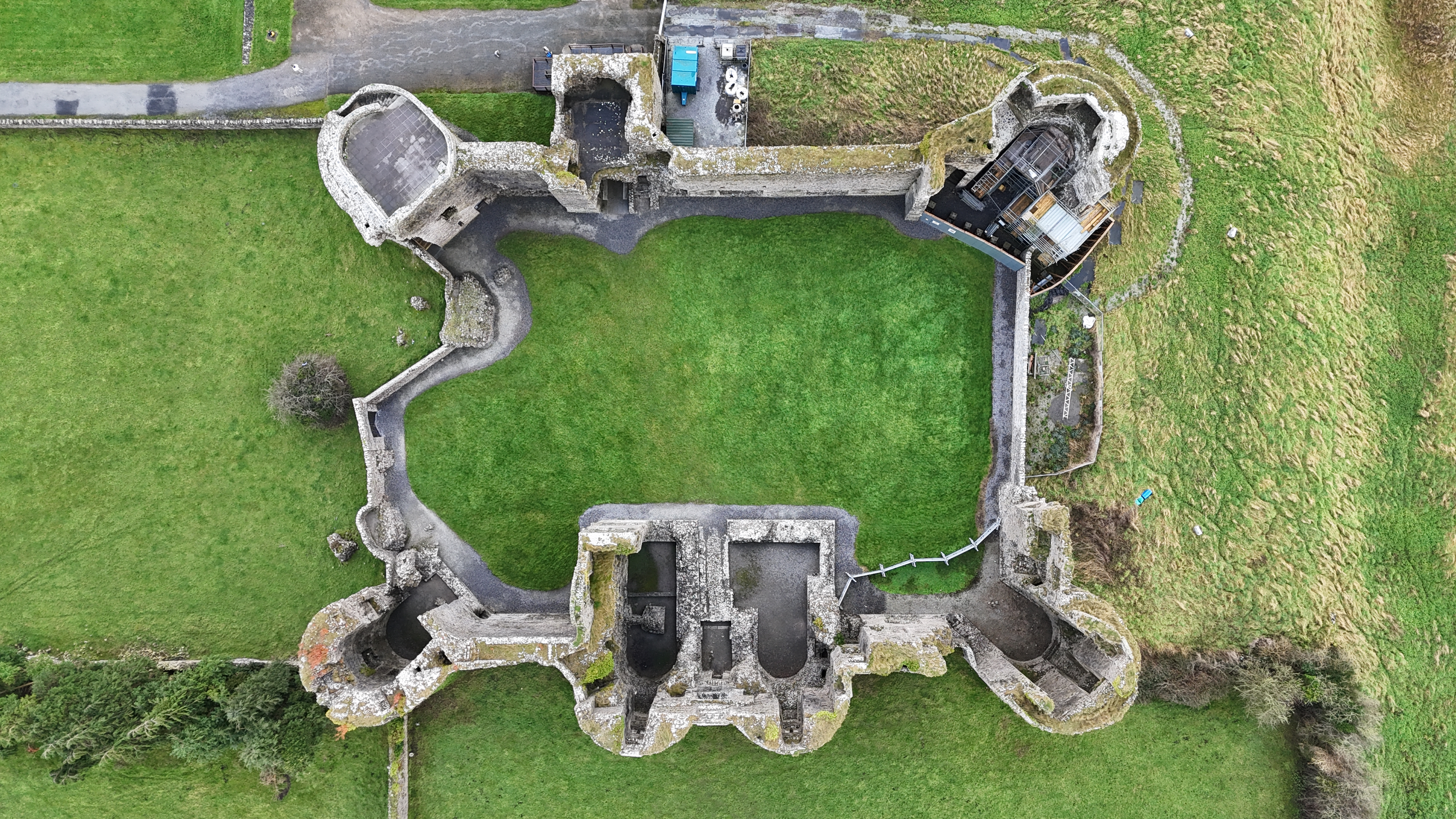
Roscommon Castle, aerial view

Roscommon Castle is located on a hillside just outside the town. Now in ruins, the castle is quadrangular in shape, it had four corner D-shaped towers, three storeys high, and twin towers at its entrance gateway, one of which still retains its immensely sturdy vaulted roof. The entire castle was enclosed by a lofty curtain wall. It was built in 1269 by Robert de Ufford, Justiciar of Ireland, on lands he had seized from the Augustinian Priory. The castle had a most chequered history. It was besieged by Connacht King Aodh Ó Conchobhair in 1272.

Eight years later it was again in the hands of an English garrison, and fully repaired. By 1340 the O'Connor's regained possession of it, and, except for a few brief intermissions, they held it for two centuries until 1569, when Sir Henry Sidney, Lord Deputy seized it. It was granted to Sir Nicholas Malbie, Elizabethan Governor of Connaught, in 1578. Two years later the interior was remodelled and large mullioned windows were inserted in the towers and curtain walls. Again, in 1641 the Parliamentarian faction gained it until Confederate Catholics under Preston captured it in 1645.

It remained in Irish hands until 1652 when it was partially blown up by Cromwellian "Ironsides" under Commissary Reynolds, who had all the fortifications dismantled. It was finally burned down in 1690, and, from the closing years of the 17th-century, it gradually fell into decay. A symmetrical moat some distance from the curtain walls surrounded the entire castle and safeguarded it. It is now a national monument.

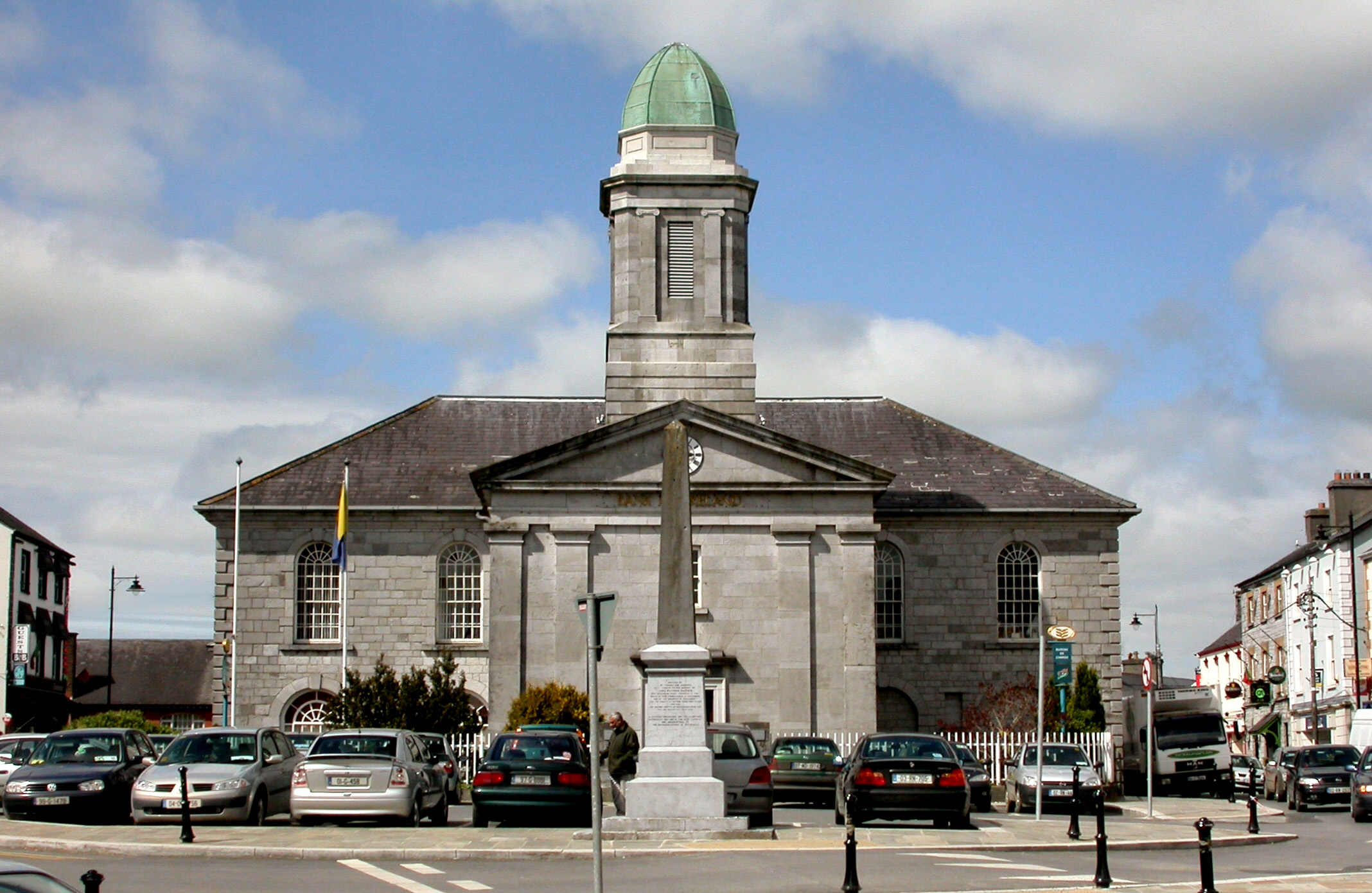
Harrison Hall, former courthouse and market house, now a bank

Harrison Hall is located prominently in the market square and is now occupied by the Bank of Ireland. Most of the ground floor was originally open to the public as a market hall with a Sessions room above. A 17th-century sessions house was originally located on the same site. Following a partial collapse of the two-storey sessions house, it was rebuilt in 1762 by Ensor brothers as a courthouse and market house. It is built in the classical architectural style. After 1863, it was adapted for use as a Catholic Church, a cupola was added. After 1903 it became a recreational hall to commemorate John Harrison (who was a physician in Roscommon town's workhouse, during the famine of the 1840s) it was used as a dance hall, cinema and theatre before it was sold to the Bank of Ireland in 1972.

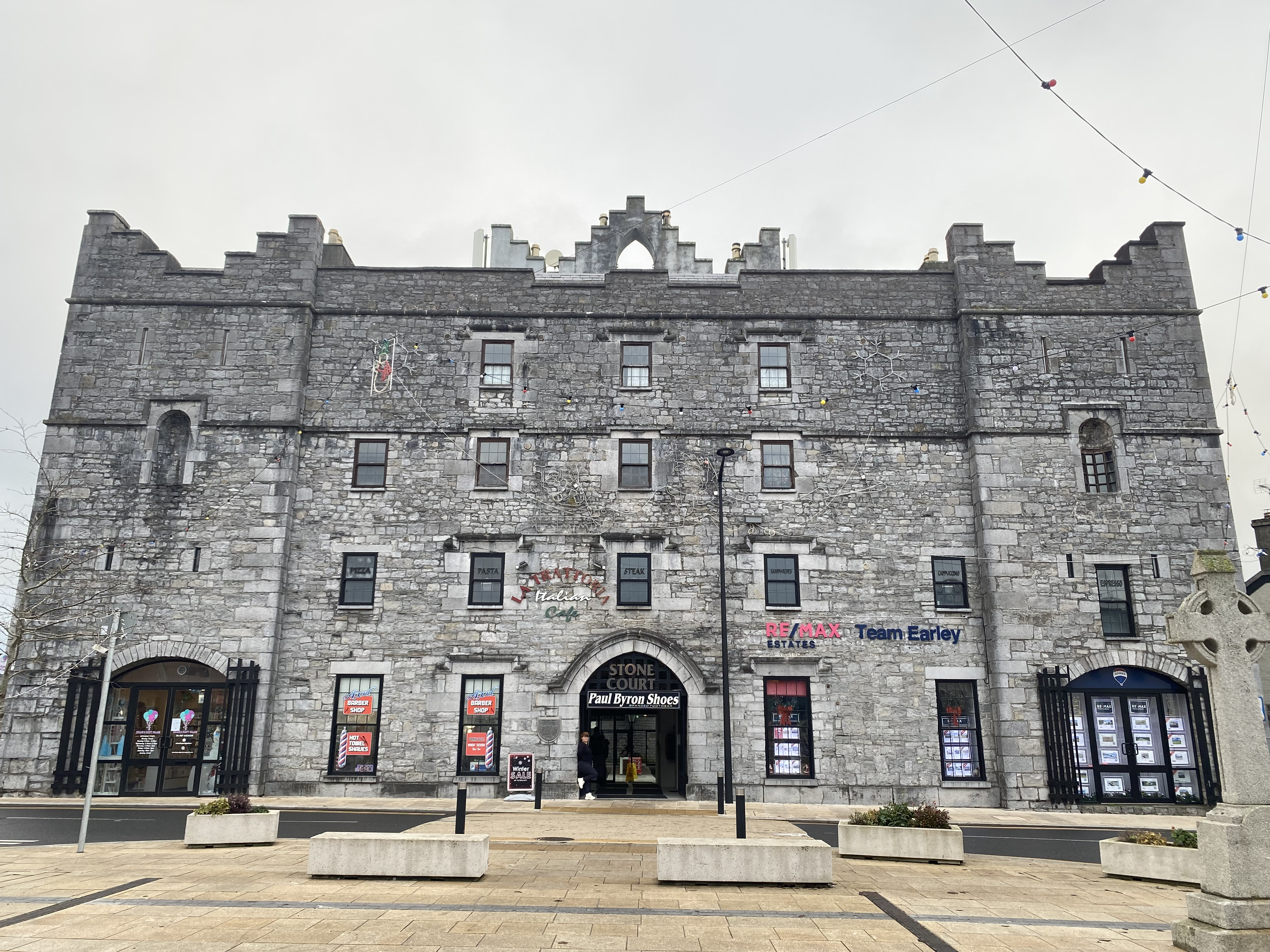
The Old Gaol

The old gaol is located at the northern end of the square and faces the back of Harrison Hall. The original building was designed by Richard Cassells and completed in 1745. The gaol had the distinction of having a hang woman, 'Lady Betty', a criminal who had her sentence withdrawn on the provision that she perform the unpaid task of hang woman. A new gaol was built on the site of the current Garda station in 1814, and in 1822 the old gaol was taken over for use as a lunatic asylum. In 1833 it became a 'Lazaretto' – a place where outcasts who suffered from smallpox were confined. Sometime after 1840 the building was converted to residential and commercial use. All but the facade of the building was demolished by a developer in the 1980s and a car park and structure containing retail, office, restaurant and residential units were constructed on the site in the late 1990s.

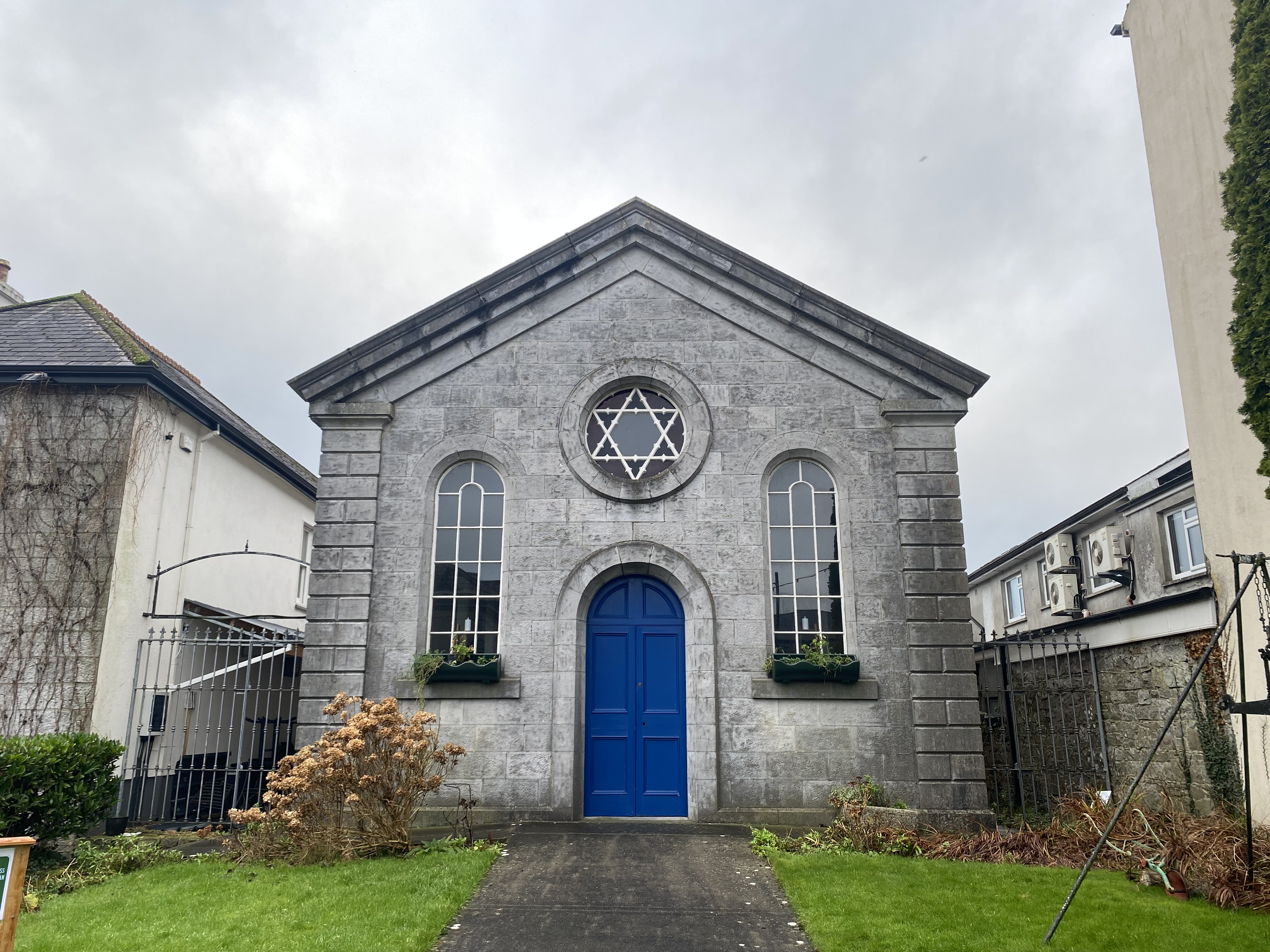
Former Presbyterian Church, now the county museum and tourist office

Roscommon County Museum and Tourism Office is located next to Harrison hall in the town square. It was originally a small Presbyterian church built in 1863, with the associated manse located next door. The building is of cut limestone with a large recessed door, circular headed windows and fenestration on the wheel window over the door is in the form of the 'Star of David' to commemorate its Welsh Builders. The building was renovated in 1991 and now contains many exhibits and artefacts illustrating and interpreting the history of Roscommon. Among the artefacts on display is a 9th-century grave slab from St Comans Abbey and a Sheela na Gig from Rahara church.

St Coman's Church is a Church of Ireland church constructed in 1775.

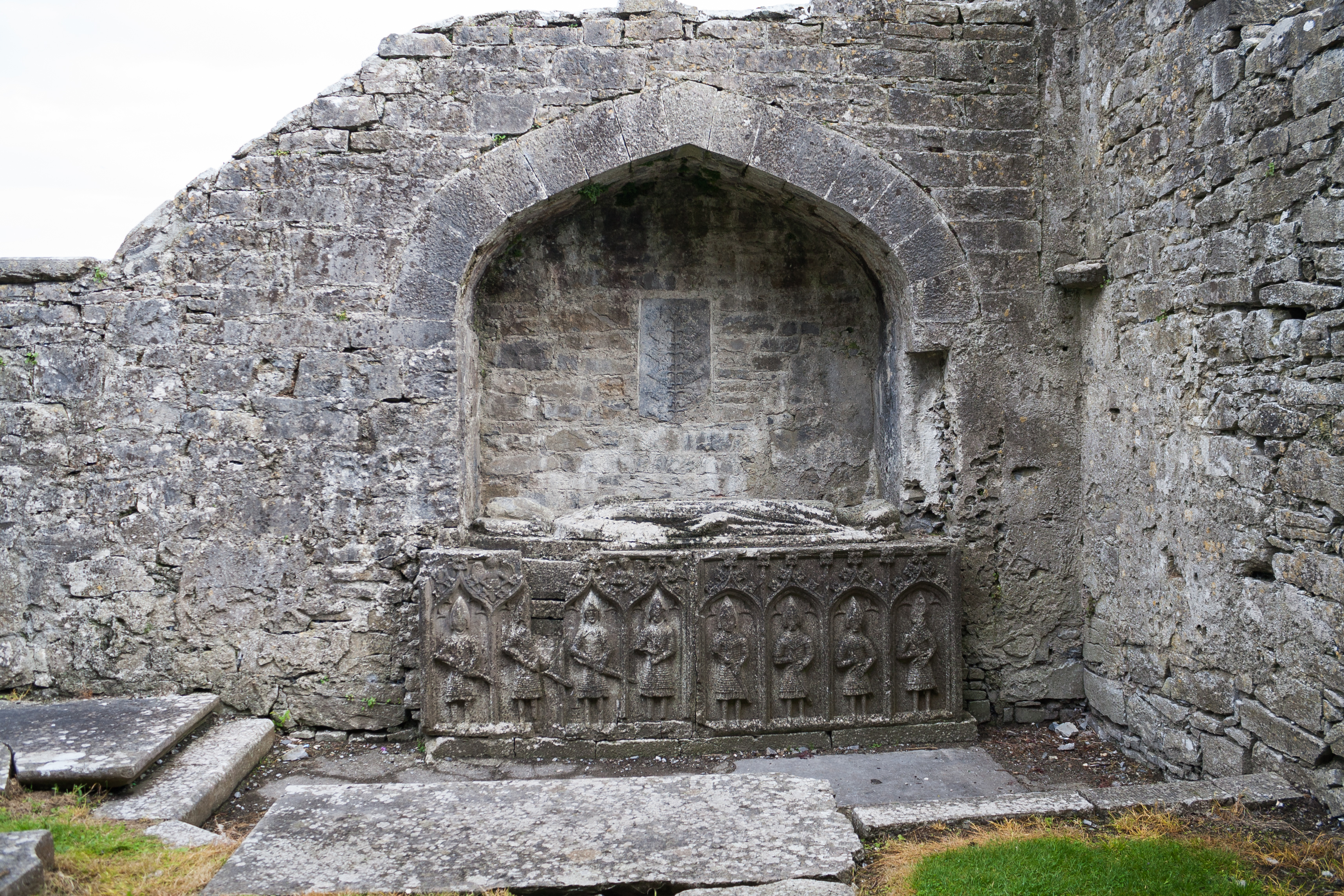
Effigy of King Felim Ua Conchobair in Roscommon Abbey

Roscommon Abbey is on the outskirts of the core of the town, and is reachable by a path at the back of the Abbey Hotel running alongside the Abbey boys' school. It was founded just over 750 years ago by King Felim O'Connor (Irish: Fedlimid Ó Conchobair) of Connacht, who was buried there himself in 1265. The effigy in a niche on the north side of the chancel is either that of himself (but carved 35 years or more after his death), or of one of his successors; dating from around 1300, it shows a king dressed in a long robe and mantle of a kind that suggests he may have been aping an English regal costume of the period, an idea supported by the fact that he carries a sceptre with fleur-de-lis head in his right hand. The tomb front supporting his effigy slab (but not originally belonging to it) bears eight niches containing fifteenth-century carved figures of gallowglasses, mercenaries of Scottish origin who played a major role in Irish wars of the Later Middle Ages. These have their bodies protected by a coat of mail and each wears a helmet known as a bascinet. All are armed with a sword, except one who bears an axe-like sparth, a typical gallowglass weapon.

Usually called the 'Abbey', it is more accurately described as a friary, it was created for Dominican friars. During the course of its existence, it experienced many misfortunate events, starting with a fire in 1270, a lightning strike in 1308, and having Lord Audley take large sums of money deposited in it by the poor people of the town for the use of his army against a king of Connacht. But the main part of the church must have survived these misfortunes, for much of its existing fabric dates from the thirteenth century, as seen in the style of the lancet windows in the north and south walls. The east wall of the church probably had five such windows grouped and graded together, but they were replaced in the fifteenth century by one single large traceried window which probably shed more light inside during the morning. At the same period, a chapel — also with a large window — was added to the north, at right angles to an aisle which is separated from the nave by an arcade supported by round columns which still partially survive. Suppressed at the Reformation, the ruined buildings were denuded of their majestic tower, and probably also of the cloister to the south, when they served as a handy stone-quarry for their owner.

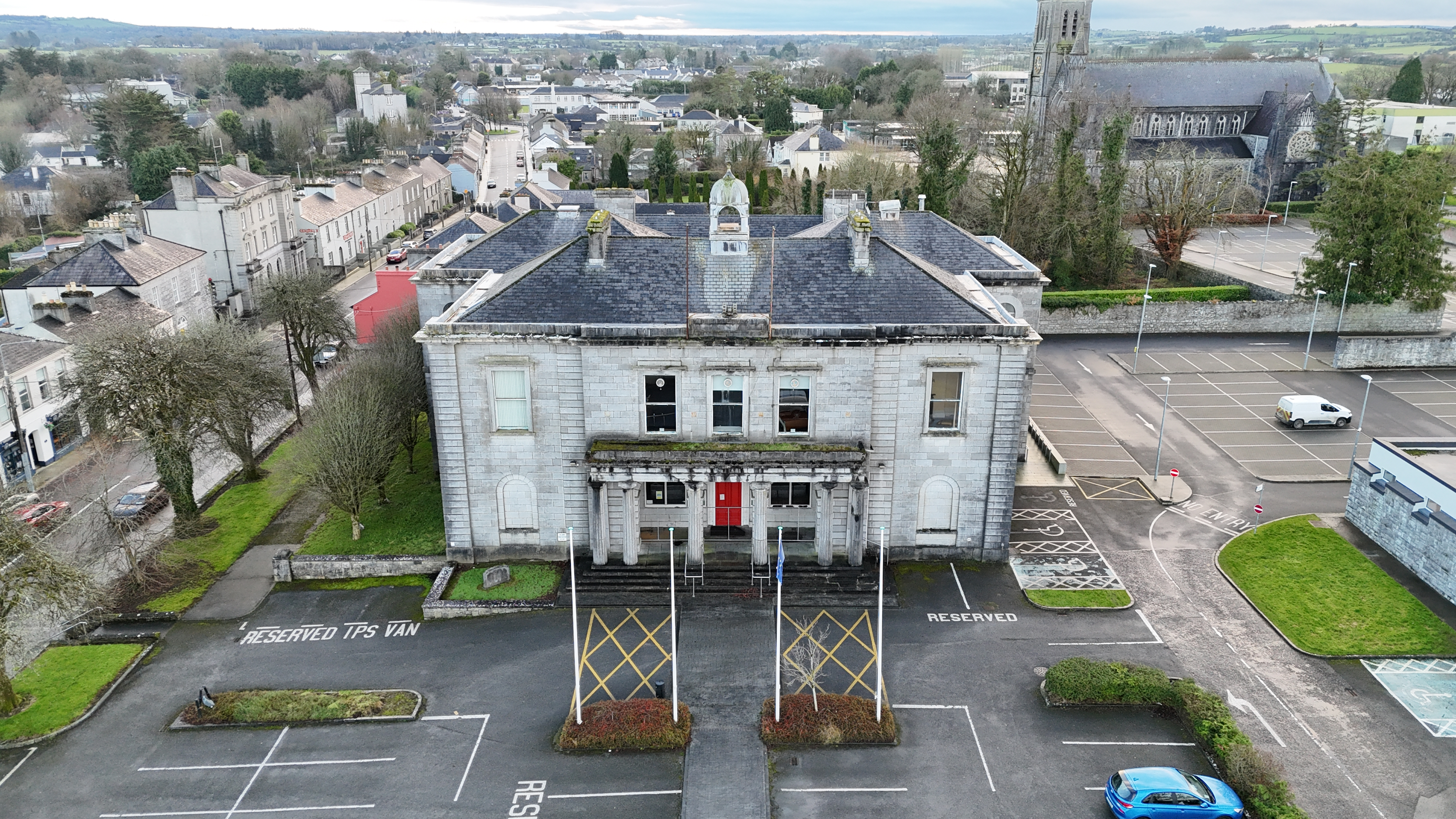
Roscommon Courthouse

Roscommon Courthouse is located on Abbey Street. It was built in 1832 adjacent to the new gaol (now the site of Roscommon garda station) to replace the previous courthouse, which is now known as Harrison Hall and which currently houses a branch of the Bank of Ireland. The courthouse was severely damaged by fire in 1882 and was restored later in the 1880s. The courthouse is the venue for sittings of Roscommon District and Circuit Courts (although they are currently sitting at a temporary alternative venue pending the refurbishment of the courthouse, which is in a dilapidated condition). The floor of the entrance hall features a mosaic of the Roscommon crest and over the main staircase hangs a large portrait of Douglas Hyde, the first president of Ireland.

Roscommon County Library is situated in Abbeytown opposite the CBS secondary school. It was built in 1783 as a hospital (then known as an infirmary). It is a 3-storey over basement limestone structure. Two symmetrical wings flank the north and south end of a central portion. The right hand wing was traditionally used as the surgeons house. It was used as a hospital until 1941. Major reconstruction work was undertaken in 1989 and the building was refitted as the County Library.

Roscommon Barracks is located at the south end of the town, close to the railway station. It was designed as a military barracks by Pierce Archbold. It is the only William and Mary style building in the town, having commenced building in 1702 and having entered operation by 1704. In the late 19th century, it was converted for use as a police barracks by the RIC. It became vacant when the police barracks was moved to the site of the disused gaol beside the courthouse on Abbey Street, and in 1907 it was purchased for use as a residence by William and Mary Jane Black. William Black was an auctioneer and was appointed as magistrate for County Roscommon in 1917. During the 20th century, the building became vacant again, and was purchased by Roscommon County Council. It is now in a dilapidated condition.

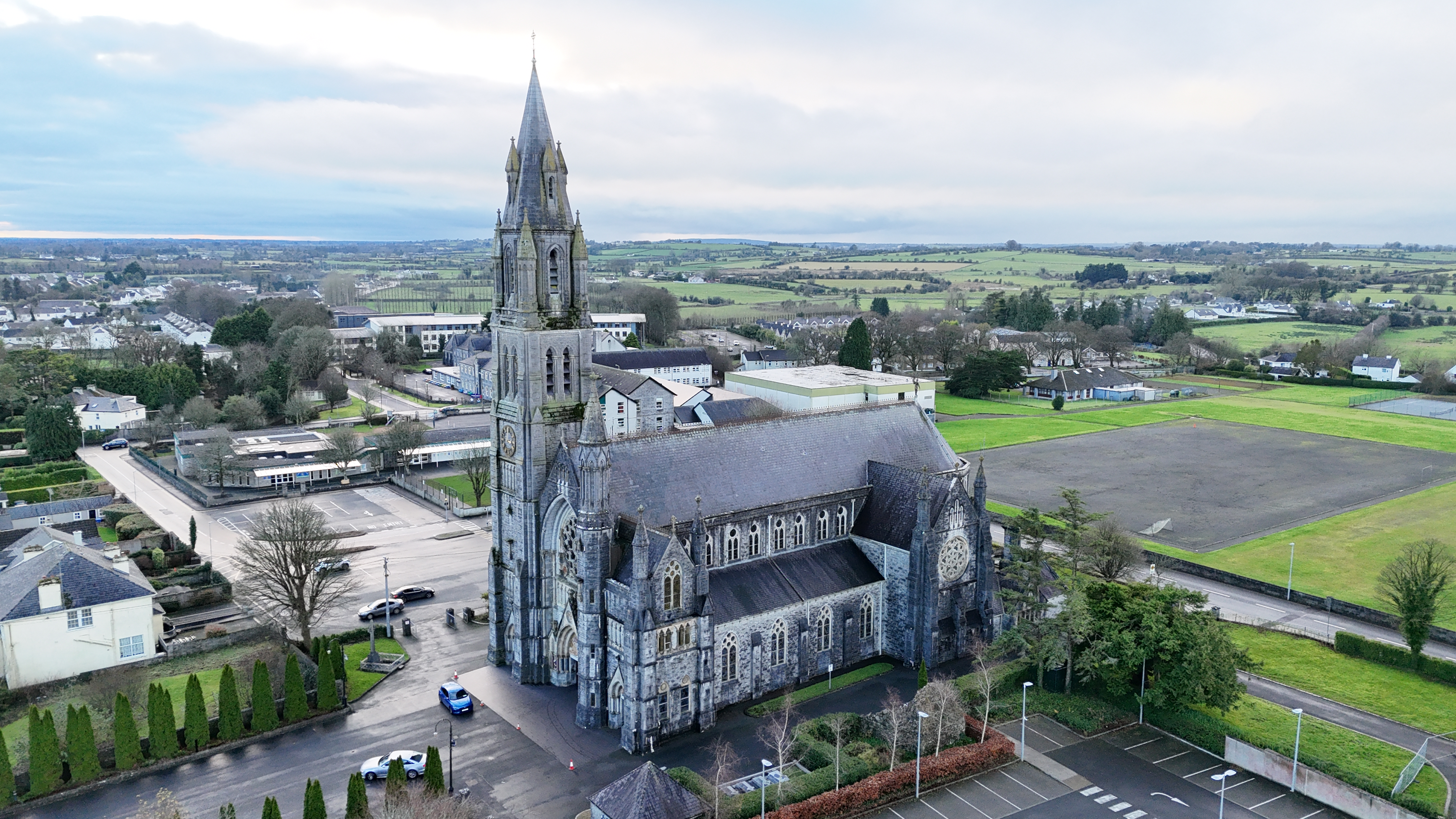
The Roman Catholic Church of the Sacred Heart

Sacred Heart Catholic Church dominates the skyline of the town. The church spire is 52 m high. Built of local cut stone and opened in 1903, it was completed in 1925. The church is built on rising ground and fronted by a sunken grotto. Over the main door is a fine example of mosaic, carried out by the Italian firm of Salviate, depicting two bishops of the diocese of Elphin connected with the building of the church. The interior is equally impressive and contained a replica of the Cross of Cong, the original of which was made in Fuerty between 1120 and 1123. This replica was stolen from the church in May 2016, and remains missing to this day.

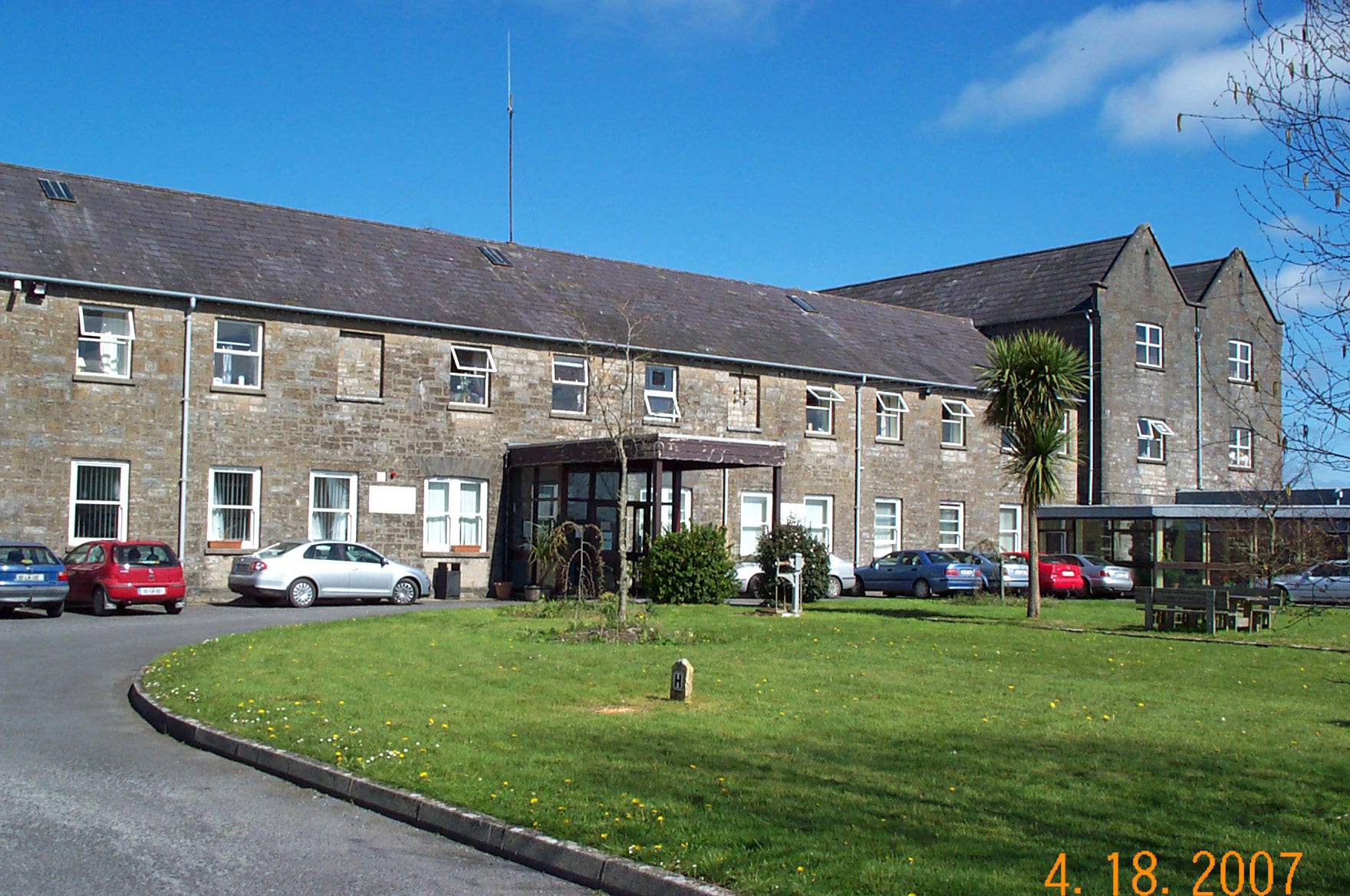
Former workhouse, now the Sacred Heart Home

Sacred Heart Home, a former workhouse, is situated on the outskirts of the town approximately 500m from the town on the golf links/ Curraghboy road. Outside this building is an Irish Famine Memorial. It was constructed on behalf of the people of Roscommon in 1999, as a permanent memorial to the thousands of Roscommon people who perished in the Famine. It is built next to the master's residence of the Workhouse. The workhouse building was constructed in 1840, in response to a sudden increase in extreme poverty and famine in the Roscommon town area. Roscommon was severely affected during the great famine, with one of the highest death rates per population recorded in the whole of Ireland, during this period the population of Roscommon suffered a 31.5% drop. The workhouse was designed for 700 paupers but housed up to 1,600 people during the famine years.

Hundreds flocked to the workhouse for sustenance and refuge. However, the workhouse could not cope with the numbers requiring assistance. This situation was reflected in a notice which was posted outside Roscommon Workhouse in January 1847, which stated that no new applicants seeking assistance could be admitted. Many who died there were buried in Bully's Acre, a short distance away.

== Transport ==
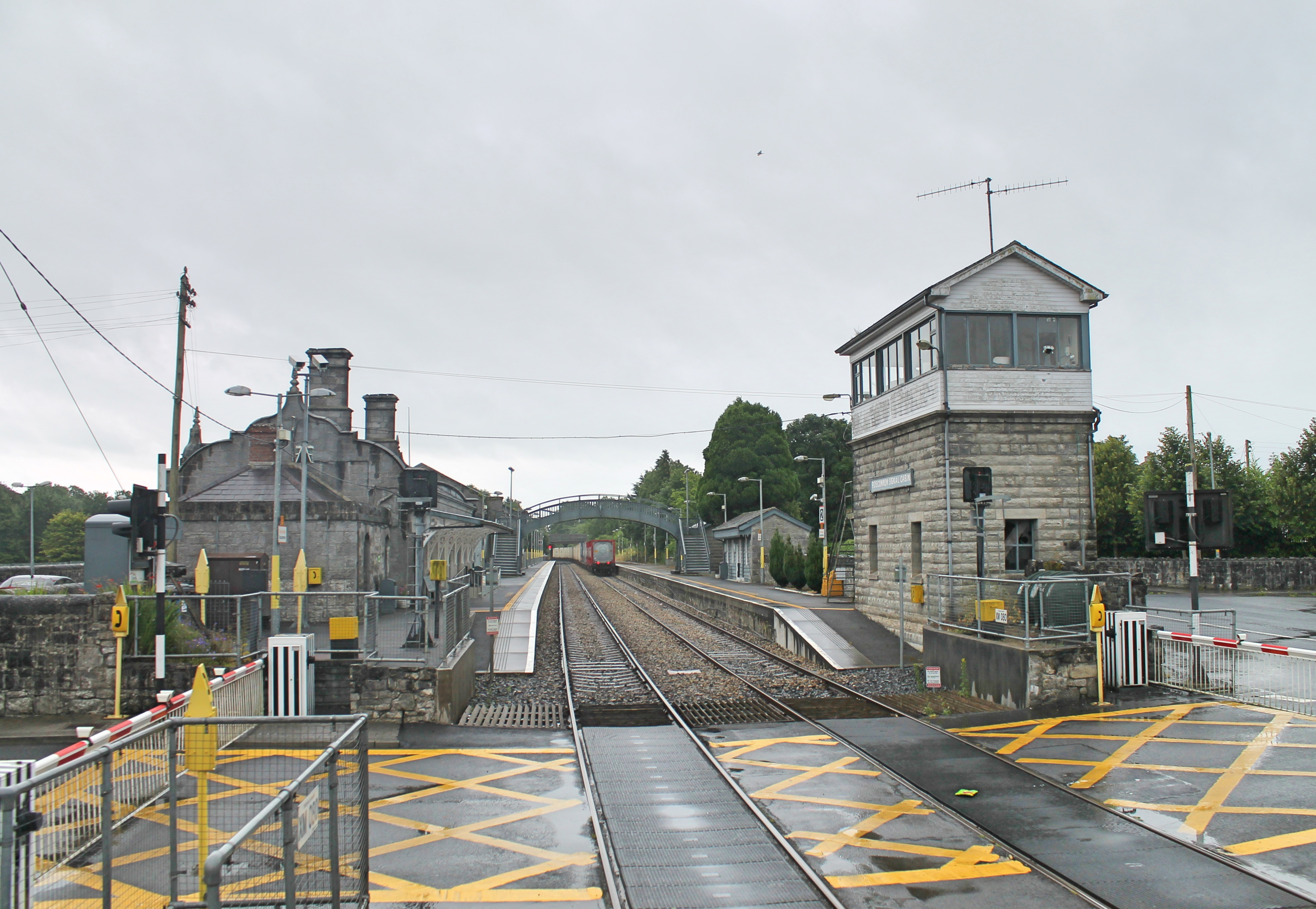
Roscommon Railway Station

Roscommon railway station opened on 13 February 1860, and offers direct rail services to all stations on the Dublin-Westport railway line, with indirect connections to the Ballina, Galway, Limerick, Cork and Waterford lines.

Major national roads lead from Roscommon to Sligo, Longford, Athlone, Castlebar, Galway and Dublin. Roscommon is located 30 km from the M6 Dublin-Galway motorway.

Bus Éireann runs regular bus services to other major towns from the Mart Road.

The nearest airport is Ireland West Airport, about a one-hour drive away.

== Health and education ==
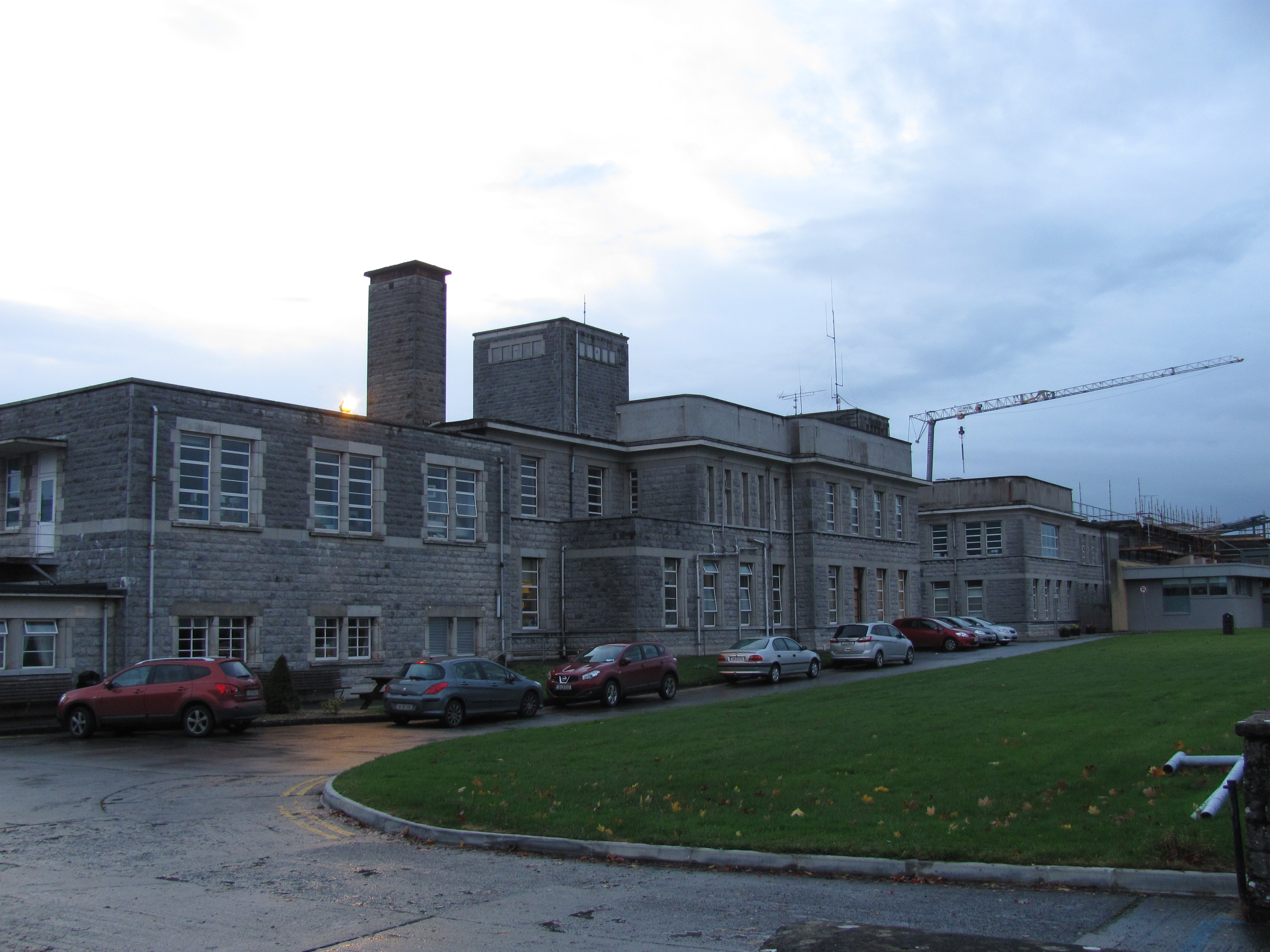
Roscommon University Hospital

The health services of Roscommon town serve all of County Roscommon and the surrounding areas, with a catchment population of around 70,000. Health services are provided by Roscommon University Hospital and rehabilitative care is available at Sacred Heart Hospital.

Roscommon town has two primary schools, namely, St Coman's Wood Primary School (which was formed after Scoil Mhuire Primary School and Abbey National School combined) and Gaelscoil de hÍde.

There are three secondary schools in Roscommon, namely, the Convent of Mercy, the Christian Brothers School and Roscommon Community College. Roscommon Community College also offers post-leaving-certificate courses.

== Events ==
Roscommon Lamb Festival takes place on the first weekend of May each year (the May bank holiday weekend). It aims to showcase locally produced food and includes a number of barbecues, craft sales and novelty events. Roscommon's Easter parade takes place every Easter Sunday.

== Popular culture ==
Roscommon is the setting for the song, She was Plucking a Duck by the Old River Suck by Bert Flynn. Flynn and his band were regular features in the dance halls of Roscommon in the 1940s and 1950s.

The Secret Scripture, a novel by Sebastian Barry, is set in Roscommon. Hanna Greally, author of Bird's Nest Soup and Flown the Nest, lived in Roscommon after her release from eighteen years of involuntary detention in a psychiatric institution.

== Sports and amenities ==
- Loughnaneane Park is situated in the town centre, behind the old gaol. It contains a children's playground, outdoor exercise equipment, a lakeside walkway, picnic tables, and Roscommon Castle.
- Mote Park, the former estate of the Crofton landlord family, approximately 1.6 km (0.99 mi) from the town centre is a woodland area covering several miles and is popular with walkers.
- Roscommon Golf Club was founded in 1904, the course, set in parklands filled with mature sycamore, beech, whitethorn trees and ash trees, was extended to eighteen holes in 1996 and now measures 6,390 meters (6,990 yards).
- Dr Hyde Park named after Douglas Hyde (First president of Ireland) is a GAA stadium with a capacity of 25,000 and is home to the Roscommon county football and hurling teams and Roscommon Gaels GAA club.
- Roscommon Racecourse is a horse racing course, which is situated approximately 1.6 km (0.99 mi) from the town centre, the track itself is an oblong right-handed track 2 km (1.2 mi) in length, and the course has stabling for up to 95 horses.
- Roscommon Leisure Centre opened early 2002 and has a 25 m (82 ft) deck level pool with a learner swimming pool and spectator gallery and fully equipped gymnasium. Situated next to the swimming pool is the home of Roscommon's most successful sport — St Coman's handball club. Established in 1930 the club has produced many All-Ireland winning handballers and world champion handballers.

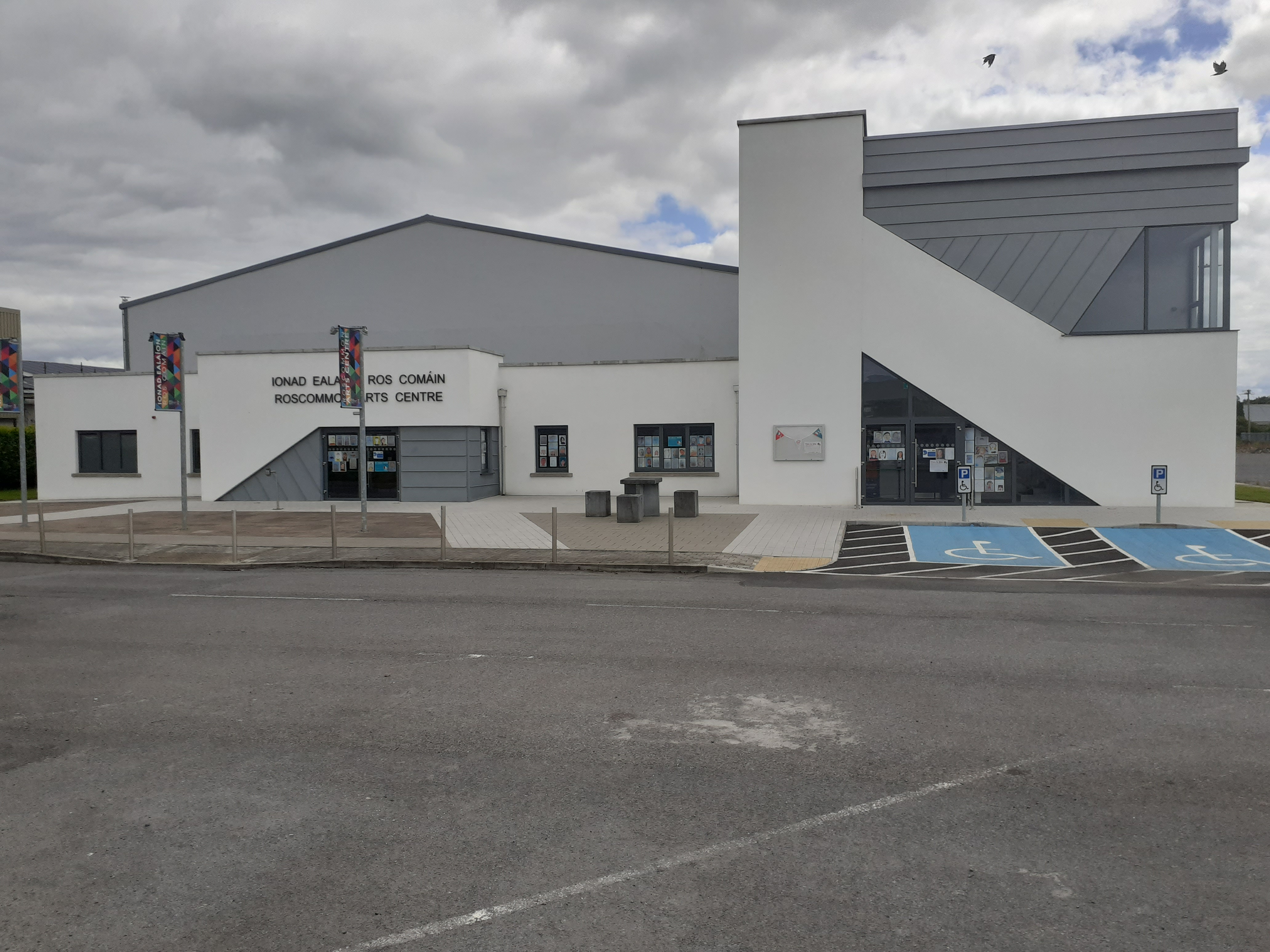
Roscommon Arts Centre

- Roscommon Arts Centre is a multidisciplinary arts facility containing an auditorium and which hosts theatre, dance, music, visual art, comedy and literature events.

== Annalistic references ==
Various annals (historical records) were compiled by Irish monks up to the early 18th century. Roscommon is mentioned in the:

- Annals of Inisfallen (AI)
- Annals of the Four Masters (M)
- Annals of Loch Cé (LC)
- Annals of Ulster (U)

The following are the records relating to Roscommon in the Irish annals. In each case, the specific Annal is denoted by the first letter(s), followed by the year it relates to, followed by a decimal point, followed by the number of the entry for that year.

M 777.5: Aedhan, Abbot of Ros Comain, died.

M 774.5: Forbhasach, son of Maeltola, Abbot of Ros Comain, died.

AI 782.2: Repose of Aed, abbot of Ros Comáin.

M 788.12: The law of St. Comman [was promulgated] by Aeldobhair, i.e. Abbot of Ros Commain, and by Muirgheas, throughout the three divisions of Connaught.

M 813.4: Siadhail, Abbot and Bishop of Ros Commain, died.

U 830.7: Ioseph son of Nechtain, abbot of Ros Comáin, rested.

M 872.2: Aedh, son of Fianghus, Abbot of Ros Comain, bishop and distinguished scribe [died].

M 914.4: Martin, Abbot of Ros-Commain, died.

M 925.6: Donnghal of Ros-Commain, died.

M 1028.3: Gillachrist, son of Dubhchuillinn, a noble priest of Ard-Macha, died at Ros-Commain.

M 1155.2: Fearghal Ua Finachta, a noble priest of Ross-Commain, [died].

LC 1265.6: Fedhlim, son of Cathal Crobhderg Ó Conchobhair, king of Connacht—the protector and supporter of his own province, and the protector of his friends on every side; the plunderer and extirpator of his enemies wherever they might be; a man full of bounty and prowess; a man full of distinction and honor in Erinn and Saxon-land—died after the triumph of unction and penitence, and was interred in the monastery of the Friars Preachers in Ros-Comain, which he had previously granted to God and the Order.

LC 1564.2: Ros-Comain was taken by the sons of Tadhg Og, son of Tadhg, son of Toirdhelbhach Ó Conchobhair, from Ó Conchobhair Donn; and they gave the town, after taking it, to Ó Conchobhair Ruadh, i.e. Tadhg Og, son of Tadhg Buidhe; and much was destroyed throughout all Connacht on account of this capture. Brian, son of Ruaidhri Mac Diarmada, and the sons of Tomaltach Mac Diarmada, with many men, went into ambush around Ros-Comain. Conchobhar, the son of Ó Conchobhair Ruadh, went out from the court that day, and the ambuscaders attacked himself and his people on all sides; and they were driven to the monastery and their horses were taken from them before the door; and they themselves went into the belfry. But this place was no defence to them. All followed them, and God decreed the termination of their lives; for, though strong the place in which they were; their heads were taken off them all. Conchobhar, son of Toirdhelbhach Ruadh Ó Conchobhair, was killed there, and ten and eleven of his people along with him; and horses were taken from them. On the Saturday of Patrick's Sunday these deeds were committed.

== Twin towns – sister cities ==
- Tucson, Arizona, United States
- Chartrettes, France

== See also ==
- List of towns and villages in Ireland
- Market Houses in Ireland
- Lord Roscommon
