= John Harrison (doctor) =

Irish physician (1815–1890)

Dr John Harrison
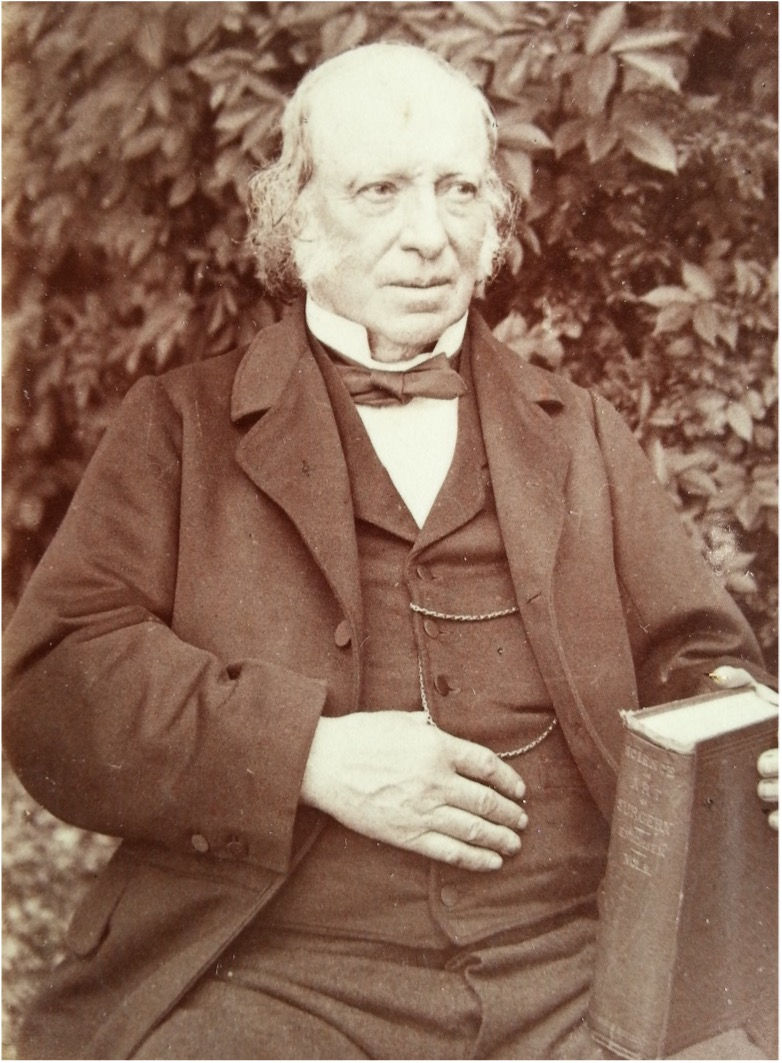
- Harrison in 1865
- Born: 24 December 1815; Roscommon, Ireland
- Died: 24 December 1890 (aged 75); Roscommon, Ireland

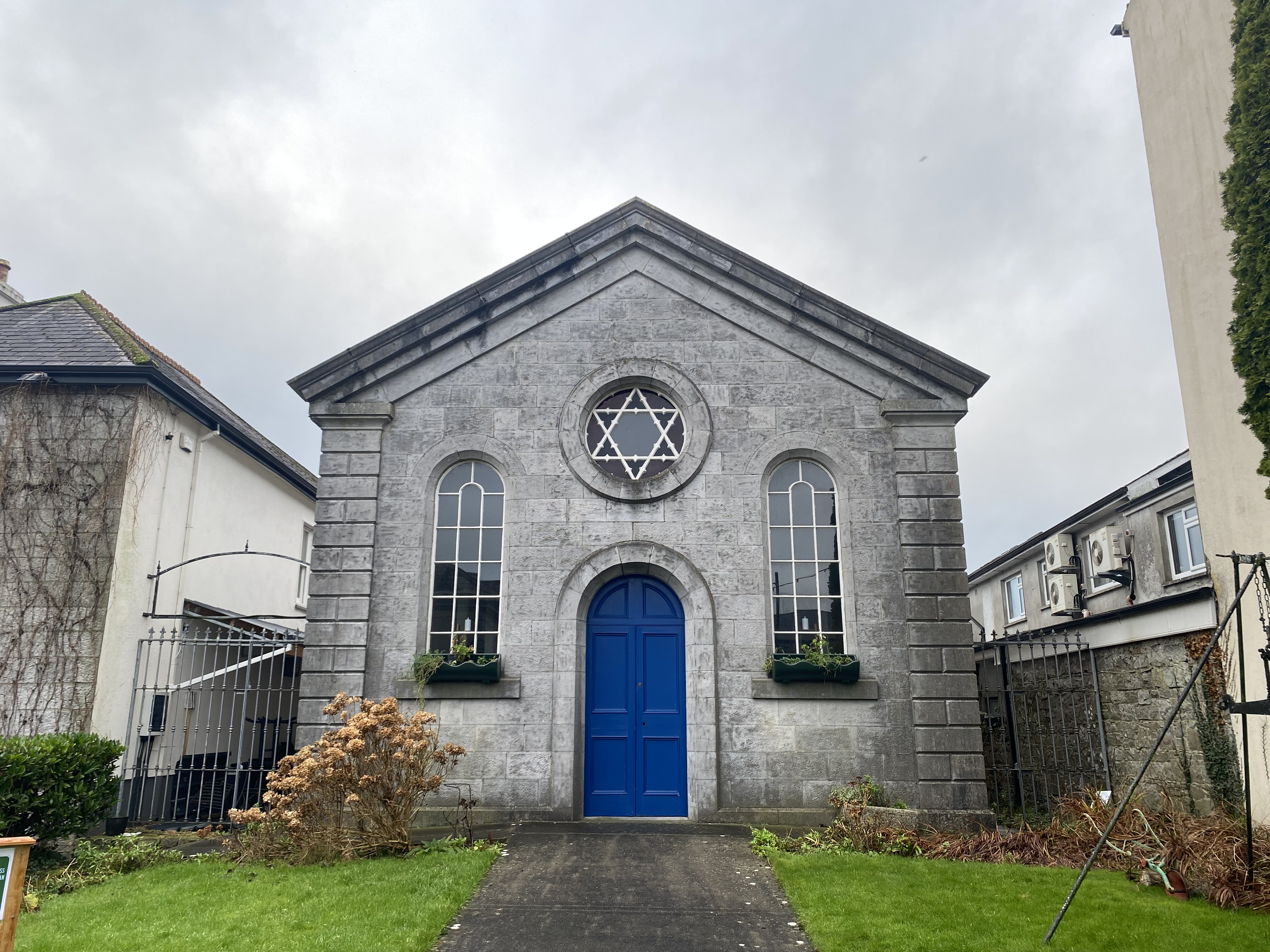
The Dr. John Harrison's Memorial Hall, currently serve as Roscommon County Museum

John Harrison (1815–1890) was an Irish physician recognised for his surgical expertise and charitable efforts during the Irish Great Famine. Born in Roscommon, Ireland, he spent his entire fifty-year medical career serving the local community. Harrison became a well-regarded figure in the town, earning the reputation of being a "favourite son" for his dedication to the well-being of its residents.

== Early life and education ==
Harrison was born and raised on Abbey Street in Roscommon town. His father, William Harrison, was a prominent merchant and a respected community member who owned thirteen properties on Abbey Street and served on the Grand Jury, an early form of local government. His mother, Anne O'Conner, was likely related to Charles O'Conner. Harrison was one of nine children, including a brother, Joseph, who later emigrated to Australia.

Harrison received his early education at the Classical Academy School in Roscommon, which was later renamed Harrison Hall. Due to restrictions on Catholic enrollment at Trinity College in Dublin, he pursued his medical studies at the University of Edinburgh in Scotland, graduating in 1841.

== Medical career ==
Harrison's medical career was notable for its breadth and impact on the local community. He served as a medical officer for Roscommon Gaol, Roscommon Workhouse, the Ballyleague dispensary, and the local fever hospital, in addition to running a private practice. Harrison became a licensed surgeon and a Fellow of the Royal College of Surgeons in Ireland in 1840, and he earned his Doctor of Medicine from the University of Edinburgh in 1841.

In 1857, local newspapers highlighted his medical expertise, reporting on his successful treatment of a young girl with a spinal condition and his skillful amputation of an injured worker's hand.

== Contributions during the Great Famine ==
During the Great Famine (1845–1852), John Harrison served as the doctor for Roscommon Workhouse, where he treated individuals suffering from starvation and famine-related diseases. Working in overcrowded and under-resourced conditions, Harrison witnessed the profound impact of the famine on the local community. In addition to providing medical care, he was often responsible for issuing death certificates for those who succumbed to the harsh conditions. His experiences during this period led him to advocate for improved conditions at the workhouse, including better food provisions for its residents.

== Charitable work and recognition ==
Harrison provided medical services to many residents of Roscommon, including those who could not afford to pay. In 1865, the townspeople held a testimonial dinner to acknowledge his contributions. He was presented with a carriage, harnesses, and an ebony casket inlaid with silver, reflecting the community's appreciation for his work.

== Later life and death ==
Harrison died at his home on his 75th birthday, 24 December 1890. He was buried in St. Coman's graveyard in Roscommon town. His tombstone bears an epitaph that highlights his "long and distinguished medical career" and notes that his death was "universally regretted by all classes, more especially by the poor, who always found in him a sincere friend."

== Legacy ==
After Harrison's death, a memorial fund was established to recognise his contributions to the community. The funds were later used to acquire the former courthouse and market house on the market square in Roscommon town, ensuring a lasting tribute to his legacy. In 1910, the building was renamed Harrison Hall in his honour. It functioned as a community centre for local events and activities until 1976, having been sold to Bank of Ireland. A neighboring building, previously the Presbyterian Church, was later designated as Harrison Hall, and now serves as the location for the County Museum and Tourist Office.

Harrison's memory is preserved through the Dr. John Harrison Memorial Trust, which was revitalised in the 1970s. The trust continues to honour his contributions to the community.
