= Sacred Heart Hospital (Roscommon) =

- Health Service Executive
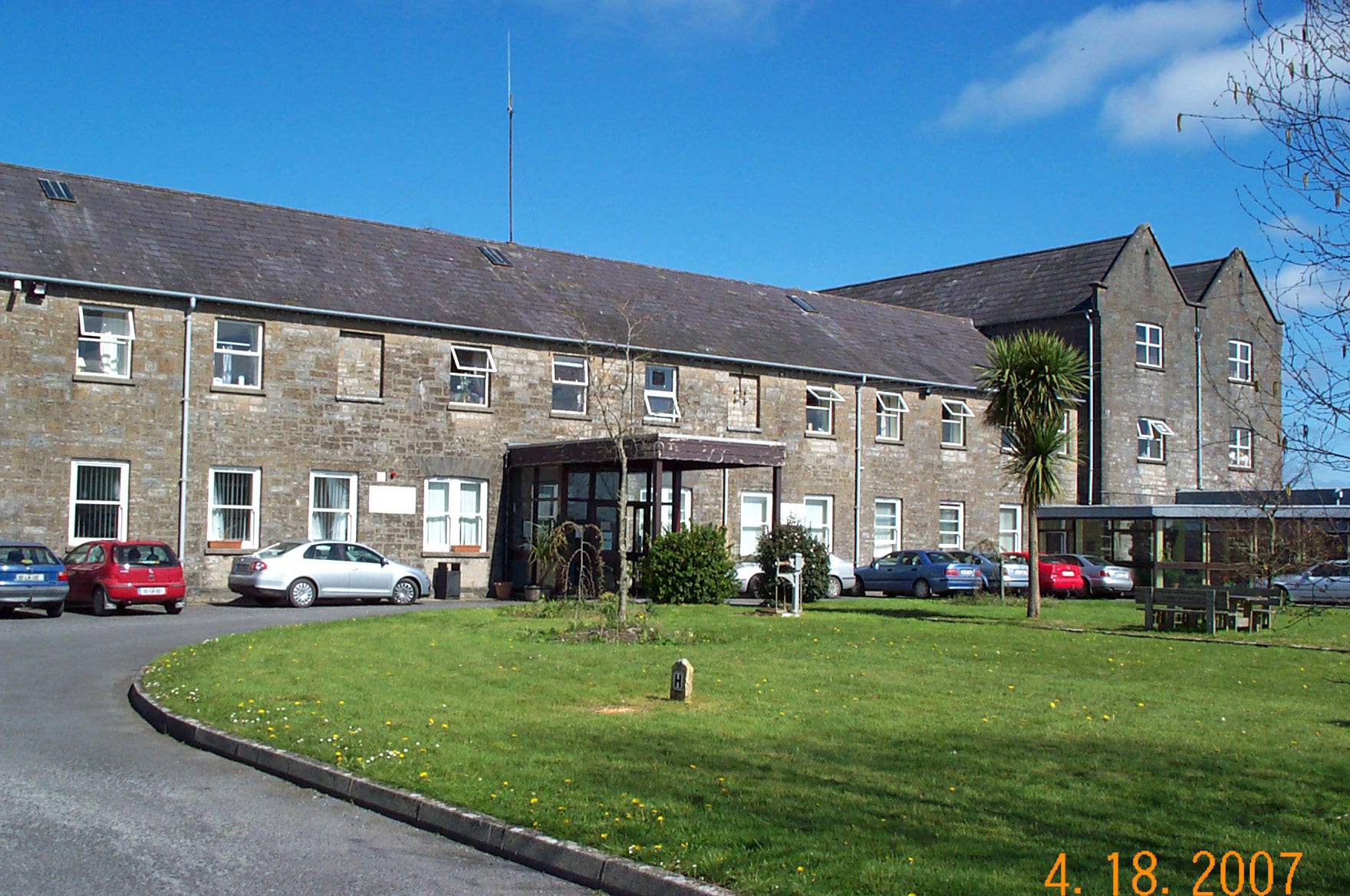
- The Sacred Heart Hospital

- Shown in Ireland

Geography
- Location: Roscommon, Ireland
- Coordinates: 53.62325°N 8.184218°W

Organisation
- Care system: HSE
- Type: Nursing Home

Services
- Emergency department: No Accident & Emergency

History
- Founded: 1842

Links
- Website: www.hiqa.ie/areas-we-work/find-a-centre/sacred-heart-hospital-1
- Lists: Hospitals in the Republic of Ireland

The Sacred Heart Hospital (Irish: Ospidéal an Chroí Ró-Naofa) is a state-run nursing home in Ireland, located just outside Roscommon town.

== History ==
The hospital has its origins in the Roscommon Union Workhouse and Infirmary which was designed by George Wilkinson and opened in 1842. It was later converted for use as a tuberculosis sanatorium and as a psychiatric hospital, and eventually used for rehabilitative services and care of the elderly.
