= McDonough (disambiguation) =

McDonough (McDonogh) is an Irish surname.

McDonough, McDonogh may also refer to:

== Place names ==
- McDonough, Delaware
- McDonough, Georgia
- McDonogh, Louisiana
- McDonough, New York
- McDonough County, Illinois
- MacDonough Island, Island County, Washington
- McDonogh Place Historic District, Baltimore, Maryland
- Lake McDonough, Barkhamsted, Connecticut

== Schools in the United States ==
- McDonogh No. 35 Senior High School, New Orleans, Louisiana
- McDonogh 19 Elementary School, New Orleans, Louisiana
- John McDonogh High School, New Orleans, Louisiana
- McDonogh School, a college-preparatory school in Owings Mills, Maryland
- Maurice J. McDonough High School, Charles County, Maryland
- McDonough School of Business, Georgetown University, Washington, D.C.
- Alma Grace McDonough Health and Recreation Center, Wheeling Jesuit University in Wheeling, West Virginia

== Ships ==
- USS Macdonough (DD-9), an early destroyer that served from 1900 to 1919
- USS Macdonough (DD-331), a Clemson-class destroyer that served from 1920 to 1930
- USS Macdonough (DD-351), a Farragut-class destroyer that served from 1934 to 1945
- USS Macdonough (DDG-39), a Farragut-class guided missile frigate (destroyer leader) that served from 1959 to 1992
- USS Commodore McDonough, an 1862 ferryboat acquired by the Union Navy for use as a gunboat during the American Civil War

== Other uses ==
- McDonough County Courthouse, in Macomb, Illinois
- McDonough Gymnasium, a multi-purpose arena in Washington, D.C.
- McDonough Museum of Art, in Youngstown, Ohio
- McDonough Park, a stadium in Geneva, New York
- McDonogh Road, in Baltimore County, Maryland
- McDonough–Fayetteville Road, part of the former Georgia State Route 920 in Metro Atlanta area, Georgia
- McDonough syndrome, medical condition
