= Sligo Cathedral =

Sligo Cathedral may refer to:

- Cathedral of the Immaculate Conception, Sligo, one of the Roman Catholic cathedrals in Ireland.
- St John the Baptist Cathedral, Sligo, one of the Church of Ireland cathedrals.
