= Roscommon County Museum =

- Músaem Chontae Ros Comáin
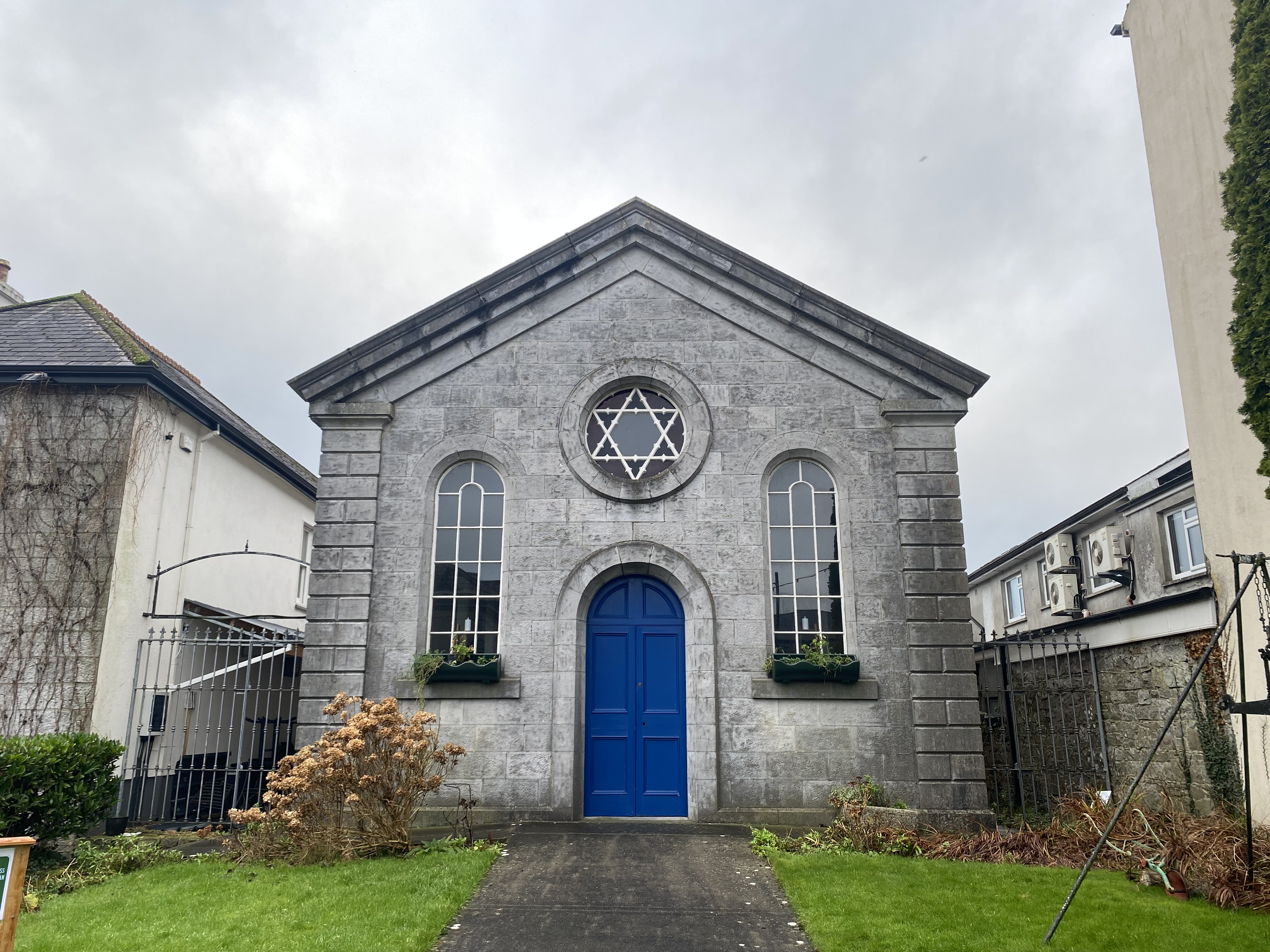
- Roscommon County Museum in 2024
- Location: The Square, Roscommon, Ireland
- Coordinates: 53.6311°N 8.1913°W
- Type: County museum
- Public transit access: Mart Road bus stop

Roscommon County Museum (Irish: Músaem Chontae Ros Comáin) is a museum dedicated to the history of County Roscommon, and is run by the County Roscommon Historical and Archaeological Society. The museum is housed in a former Presbyterian church in Roscommon town.

== History ==
The museum is situated within a former Presbyterian church, also known as Dr. John Harrison Memorial Hall. The building itself dates from 1863, and sits on The Square in the town. The most distinctive element of the building is the wheel window over the door which featured a ‘Star of David’ to commemorate its Welsh Builders. The museum is run on a voluntary basis by the County Roscommon Historical and Archaeological Society, and has been housed in the church since the early 1990s.

== Contents ==
The collections document the history of County Roscommon over the centuries. These most notably include a 9th-century slab from St Coman's Abbey, and a Sheela na gig from Rahara church. There is also a replica of the Cross of Cong, which was made in County Roscommon, along with the Shrine of Manchan, by the master gold-craftsman named Irish: Mael Isu Bratain Ui Echach "Mailisa MacEgan". To the rear of the building, there is an outside space which houses examples of horse drawn farm machinery.

The building also houses the Roscommon Tourist Information Office.
